= GNL =

GNL may refer to:

- Galveston National Laboratory, a biocontainment lab in Texas
- Gangulu language
- Gender-neutral language
- GFSN National League, a British amateur football league
- Ghandhara Nissan, a Pakistani automobile manufacturer
- Gordon Newey, a defunct British car manufacturer
- Green Lane railway station, in England
- Regucalcin, a protein
