= Hanzer =

French manufacturing company

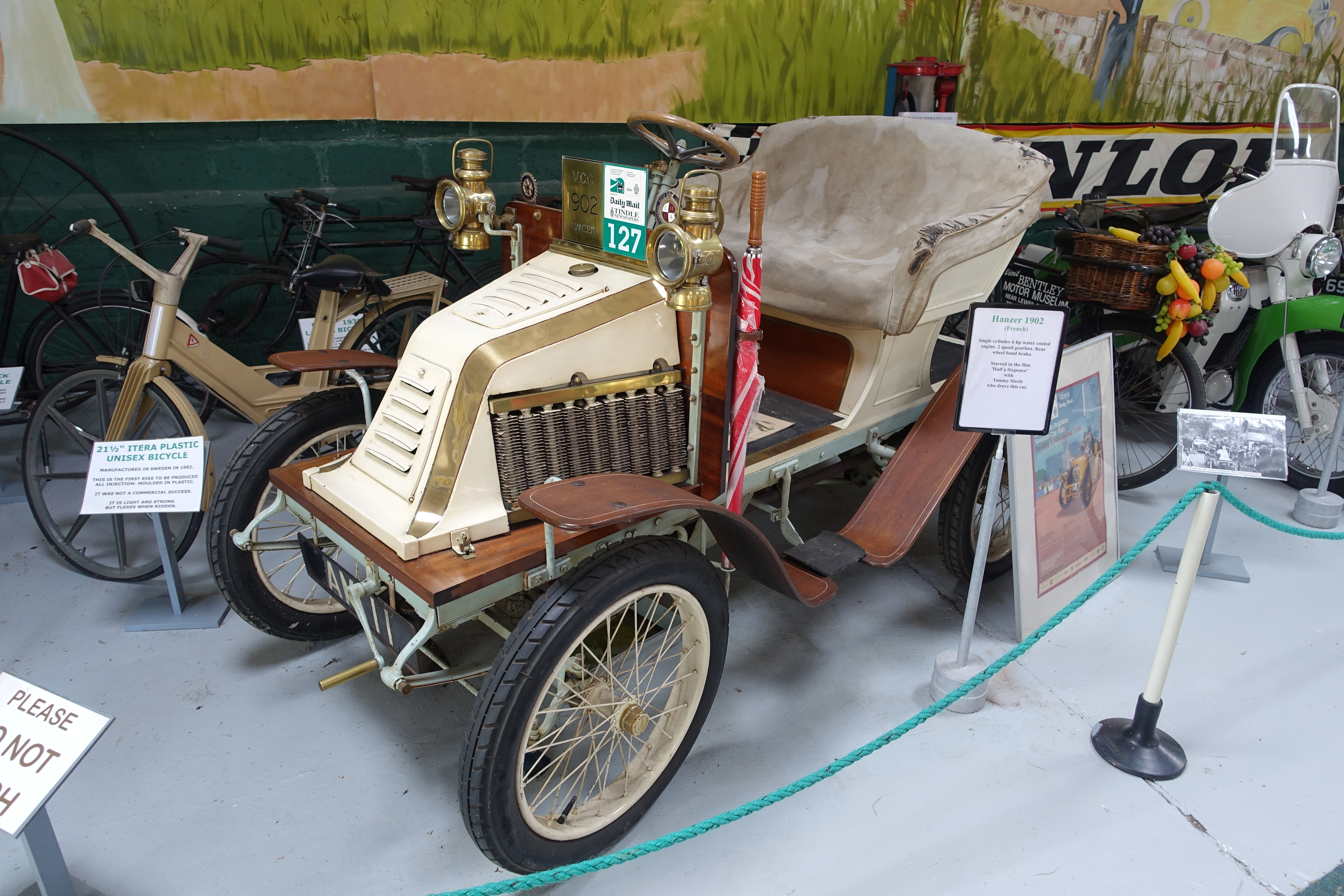
1902 Hanzer in the collection of the "Bentley Wildfowl and Motor Museum"

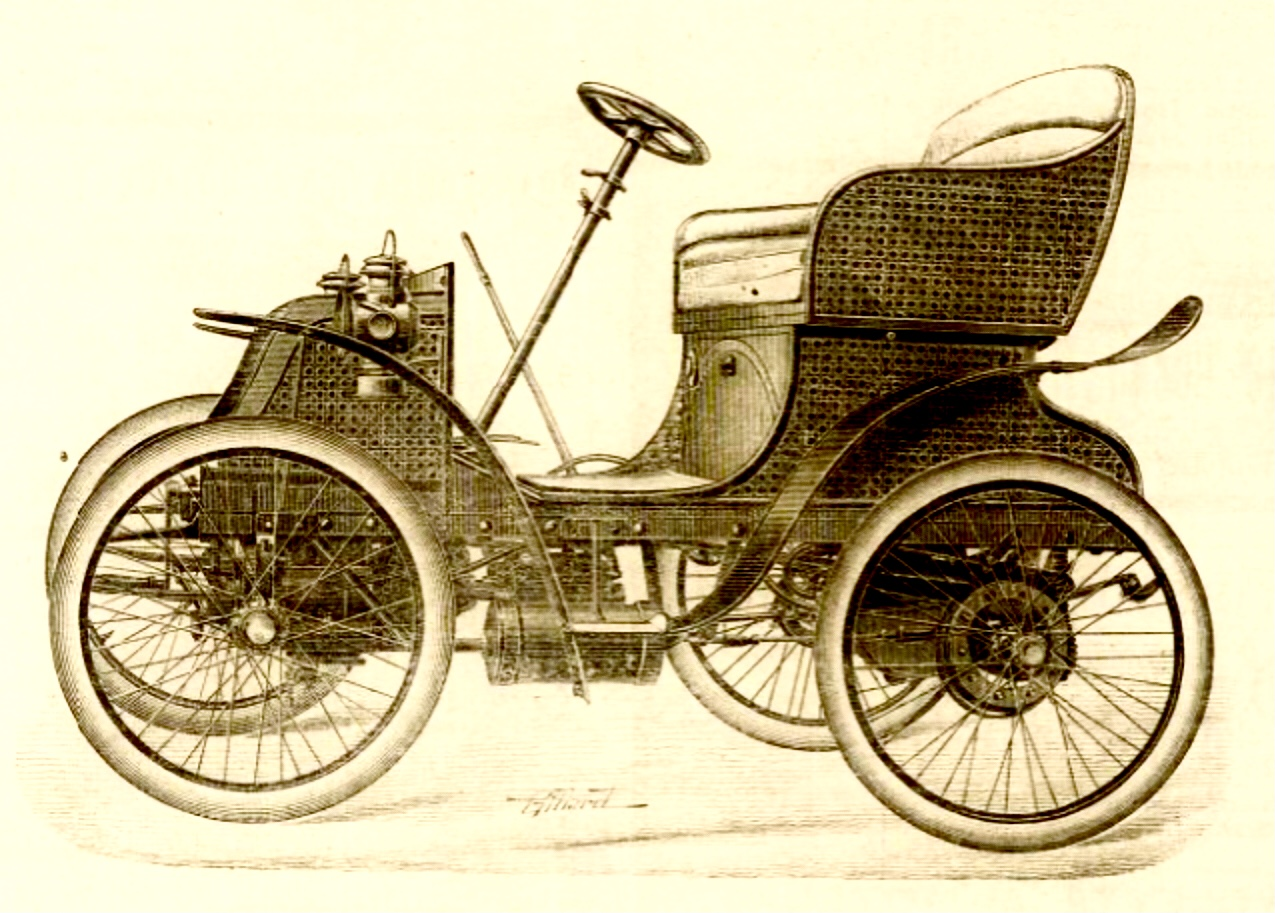
Hanzer (1900)

Hanzer Frères, Hanzer, was a French manufacturer of automobiles. The Petit-Ivry company of Ivry-sur-Seine began building automobiles in 1899. Production ended in 1903.

== Vehicles ==
=== 1899 ===
In 1899 the first model produced was a tricycle.

=== 1900 ===
In 1900 they introduced a voiturette powered by a 3 Hp De Dion-Bouton engine.

=== 1901 ===
In 1901 both two and four-seater models were produced with 6 Hp engines from the Parisian builder Ateliers de Construction Mecanique l'Aster (Aster).

=== 1902 ===
In 1902 the Parisian Durey-Sohy (de: Durey-Sohy) company took over production. A 1902 vehicle survives in the Bentley Wildfowl and Motor Museum at Halland, East Sussex. It is occasionally used in the London to Brighton Veteran Car Run.

=== 1903 ===
In 1903 the range consisted of the 5 HP and 6 HP single-cylinder models and the 9 HP two-cylinder model.

== Literature ==
- Harald H. Linz, Halwart Schrader : The International Automobile Encyclopedia . United Soft Media Verlag, Munich 2008, ISBN 978-3-8032-9876-8.
- George Nick Georgano (Editor): The Beaulieu Encyclopedia of the Automobile. Volume 2: GO. Fitzroy Dearborn Publishers, Chicago 2001, ISBN 1-57958-293-1 . (English)
- George Nick Georgano: The Complete Encyclopedia of Motorcars. 1885 to the Present. Ebury, 1975.
