= Horley (automobile) =

British automobile

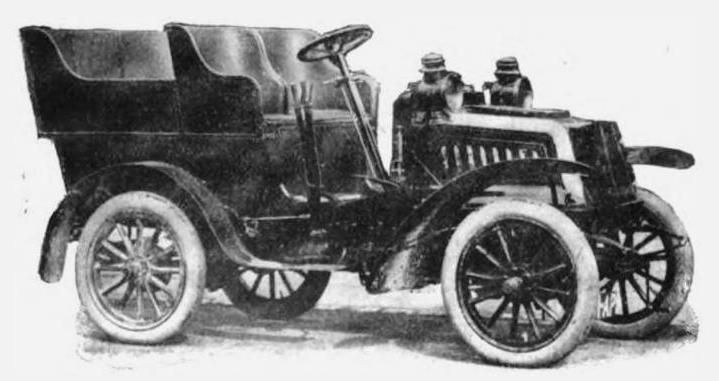
Horley 8 HP 4-seater (1904)

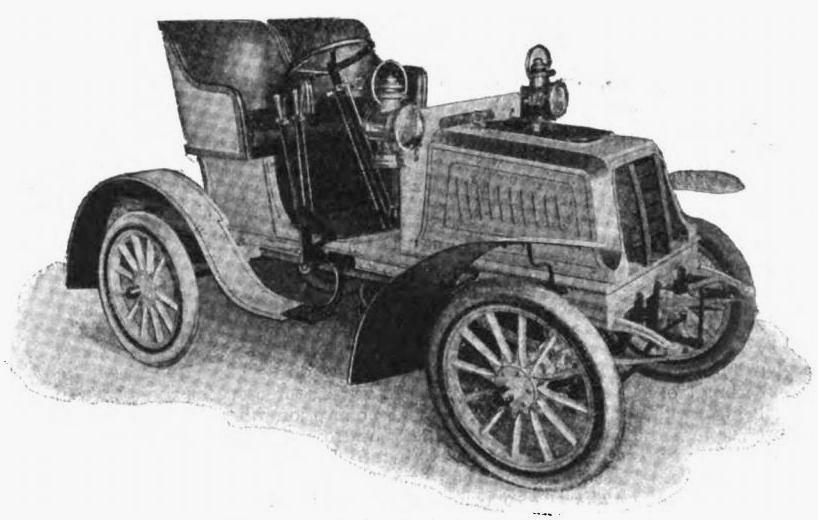
Horley 8 HP 2-seater (1904)

The Horley Motor & Engineering Co. Ltd was a British automobile manufacturer in Horley, Surrey, producing light vehicles between 1904 and 1909. The brand names were Horley and No Name. Horley collaborated with Lacoste & Battmann, the French supplier of vehicle components, assemblies and unbranded vehicles equipped with Aster, De Dion-Bouton or Mutel engines.

The manufacturing premises were at Balcombe road, Horley.

== Models ==
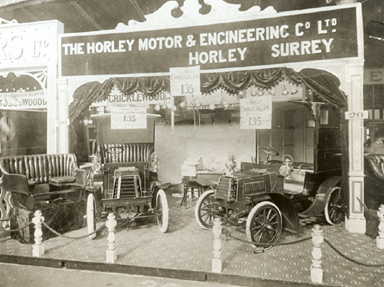
The Horley Motor & Engineering exhibition stand, circa 1904/6

=== 1904 ===
The first model, an 8 HP two-seater, was exhibited at the Crystal Palace Automobile Show in London in 1904. It was reportedly sold under both the Horley and No Name brand names. It used a front-mounted, single-cylinder engine equipped with mechanically operated valves, which was supplied by the Motor Manufacturing Company (M.M.C.) of Coventry. The transmission had three forward gears plus reverse gear, and a shaft drive to the rear axle. The wheels had wooden spokes ("artillery wheels").

The 8 HP was initially offered as a two-seater, but later in 1904 it was enhanced with space for four people. Production continued for three years.

The original price of £105 made Horley one of the earliest companies to achieve the figure of 100 gns (guineas) for a complete car.

=== 1906 ===
In 1906 the model was uprated to become the Horley 9 HP, which had an engine with a displacement of 1,182 cm³ and a wheelbase of 1,828 mm. This resulted in a price increase.

=== 1907 ===
In 1907 the Horley 8½ HP replaced the 9HP. There was also a light touring car with a 904 cc White and Poppe water-cooled, side-valve two-cylinder inline engine. The wheelbase of the car was 1,854 mm.

=== 1908 ===
In 1908 a delivery van was introduced, with an engine from Aster of Paris, the leading supplier of engines.

== Demise ==
=== Revival project ===
Circa 2020 the Horley Autocar Community Project was announced with the objective:

"... to build a replica of the Horley car, in one of its various forms that were manufactured 1904 to 1914 at the Horley Motor and Engineering premises, Balcombe Rd, Horley."

The project is intended: ... to be managed by students and masters at Oakwood School, Balcombe Rd, Horley.

Two presentations of the objectives were made in early 2020, one to Crawley Chamber of Commerce and the other to Horley Historical Soc, however, other than continuing research, Covid stopped the engagement of personnel to progress the project and Oakwood withdrew as a result. Subsequently, the non-profit limited company formed to operate as a charity to build the car has been dissolved. As of 2023 the initiative is now a private venture of J Parks Young Esq. of Horley and Boxell Engineering of Smallfield.

== Literature ==
- David Culshaw, Peter Horrobin: The Complete Catalog of British Cars 1895-1975. Veloce Publishing, Dorchester 1999, ISBN 1-874105-93-6 .
- Harald H. Linz, Halwart Schrader : The International Automobile Encyclopedia . United Soft Media Verlag, Munich 2008, ISBN 978-3-8032-9876-8 .
- George Nicholas Georgano (Ed.): The Beaulieu Encyclopedia of the Automobile . tape 2 : G-O . Fitzroy Dearborn Publishers, Chicago 2001, ISBN 1-57958-293-1 (English).

== See also ==
- List of car manufacturers of the United Kingdom
