= Newey =

Newey is an English surname of Old English origin. The name is topographical, meaning someone who lived at a new enclosure.

Notable people with this surname include:

- Adrian Newey (born 1958), English racing car designer and engineer
- Brandon Newey (born 1992), American racing driver
- Glen Newey (1961–2017), English political philosopher and professor
- Gordon Newey, British automobile manufacturer
- John Newey, English Anglican priest
- Tom Newey (born 1982), English footballer
- Whitney K. Newey, American economist
