= Lacoste & Battmann =

French manufacturer of automobiles

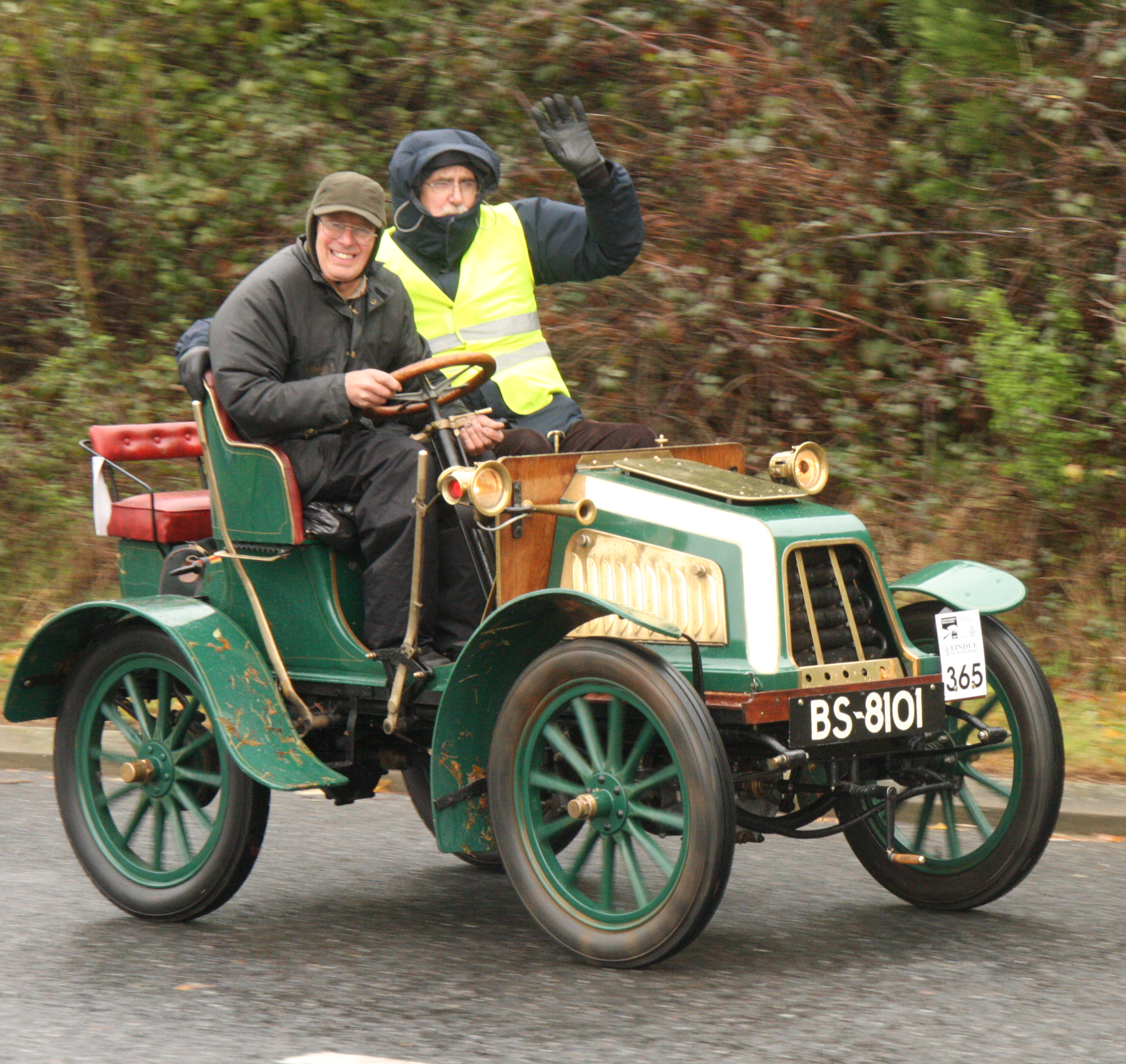
1904 Lacoste et Battmann on the London to Brighton Veteran Car Run 2009.jpg

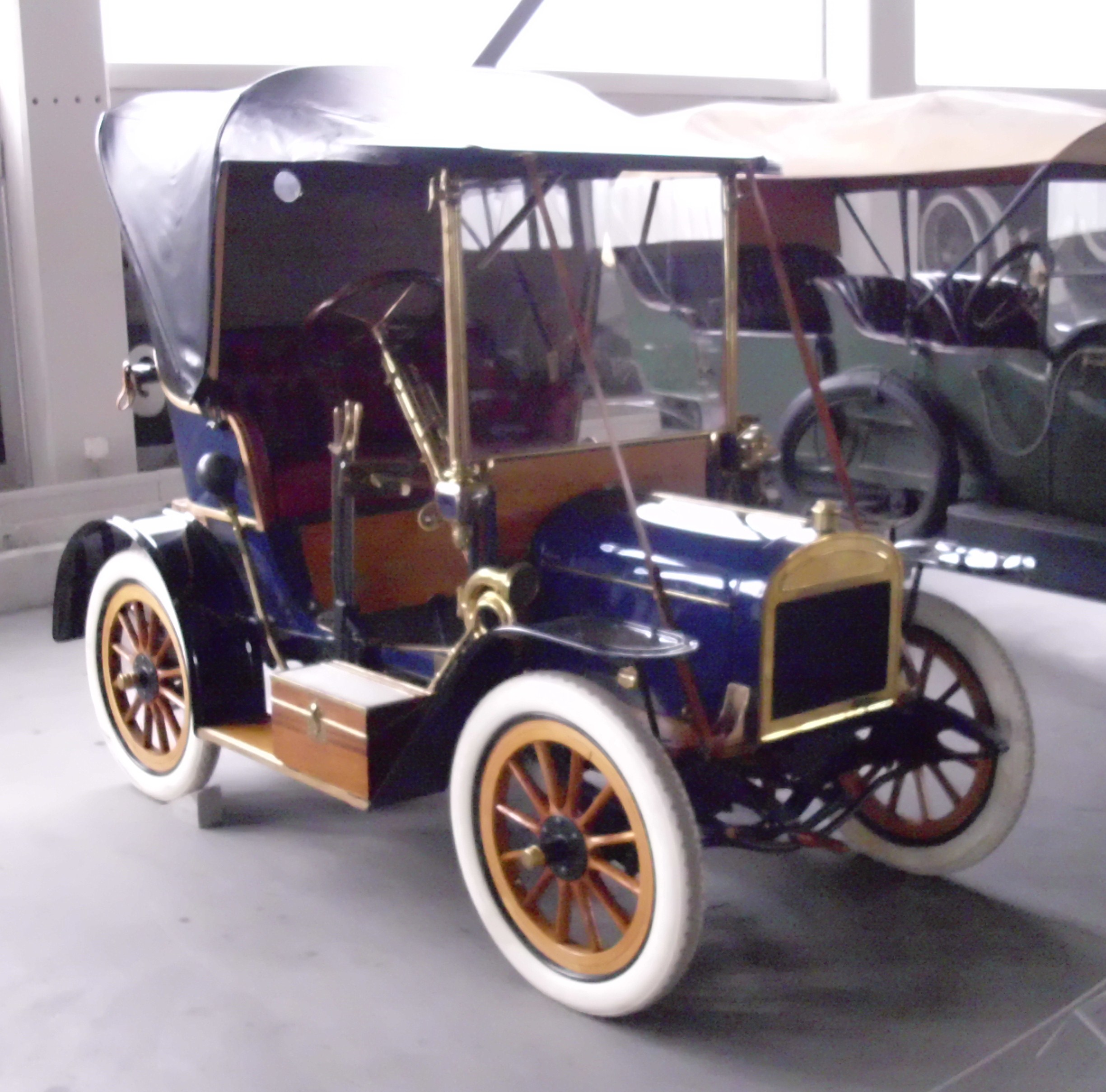
1907 Lacoste & Battmann

Lacoste & Battmann, Lacoste et Battmann, was a French manufacturer of automobiles, based in Paris, from 1897 until 1913.

== Company history ==
Jacques Lacoste founded the company J. Lacoste et Cie in Paris in 1897 for automobile production. In 1901 the name was changed to Lacoste & Battmann and 1905 in Lacoste & Battmann Ltd.

The company sold limited numbers of finished vehicles under its own name, and via its own marques: Cupelle (1905) and L & B. In addition finished chassis, equipped with Aster, De Dion-Bouton or Mutel engines, were supplied to competing companies such as : Gamage, Horley Motor & Engineering Co. Ltd (sold as Horley and No Name), Imperial, Jackson, Lacoba, E. H. Lancaster, Napoleon, Regal, Simplicia and Speedwell Motor & Engineering, which completed the chassis and bodywork to offer complete cars under their own names.

Production ended in 1913.

== Vehicles ==
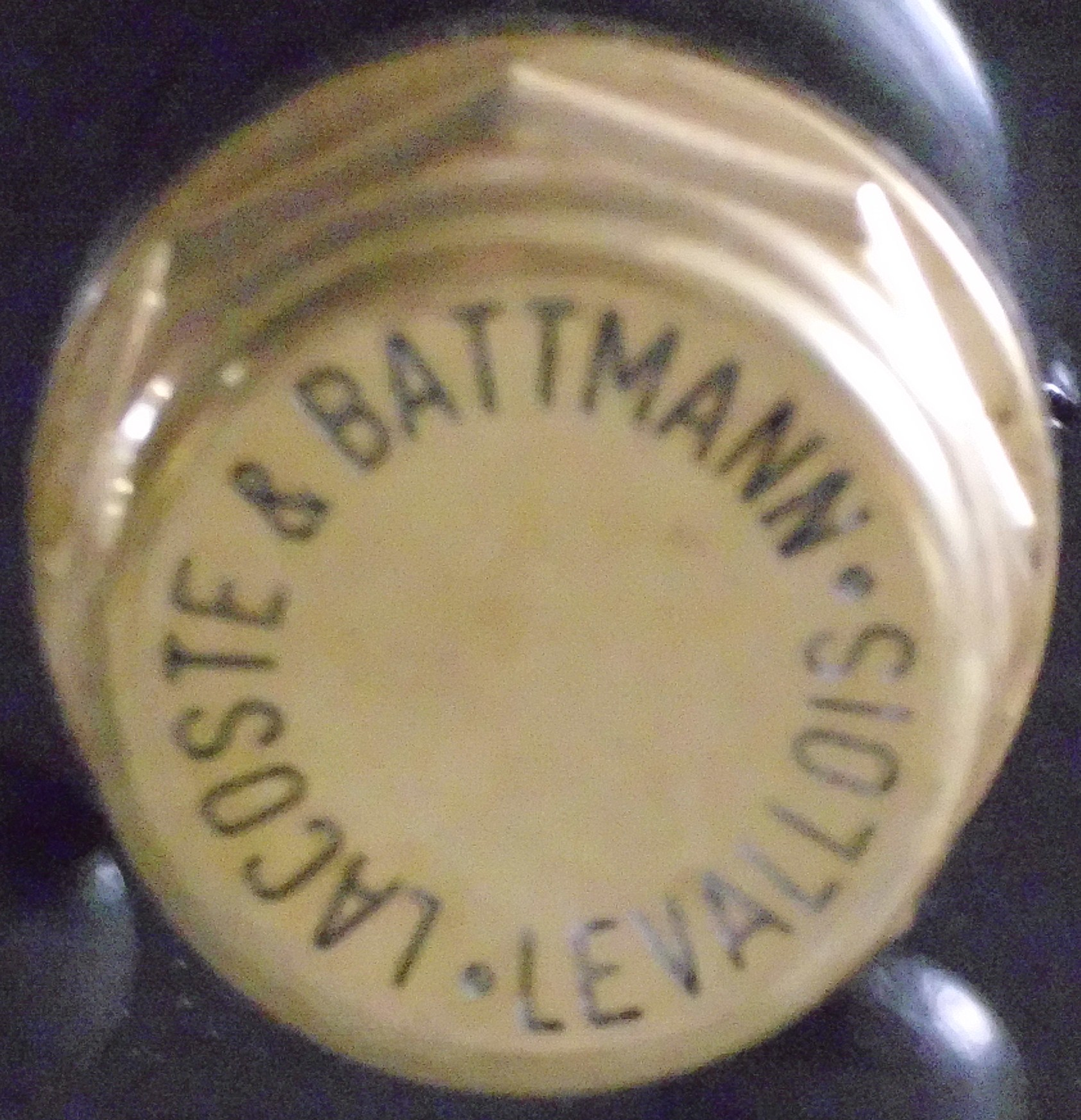

- 1897: 4 CV (4 hp) quadricycle with electric ignition.
- 1903: 6 CV single-cylinder and 12 CV two-cylinder built -in engine from De Dion-Bouton as well as 24 CV four-cylinder engine from Mutel.
- 1904: Single cylinder model with a displacement of 700 cm^{3}
- 1905: single-cylinder models, 10 CV two-cylinder with 2000 cm^{3} displacement and four-cylinder models with 2500 cm^{3}, 3300 cm^{3} and 4900 cm^{3} displacement; Engines from Aster and De Dion-Bouton
- 1906: 12/16 CV
- 1907: One-, two- and four-cylinder models from 4.5 CV to 24 CV as well as electric cars
- 1910: Four-cylinder model with a displacement of 1800 cm^{3}, Aster engine
