= Ateliers de Construction Mecanique l'Aster =

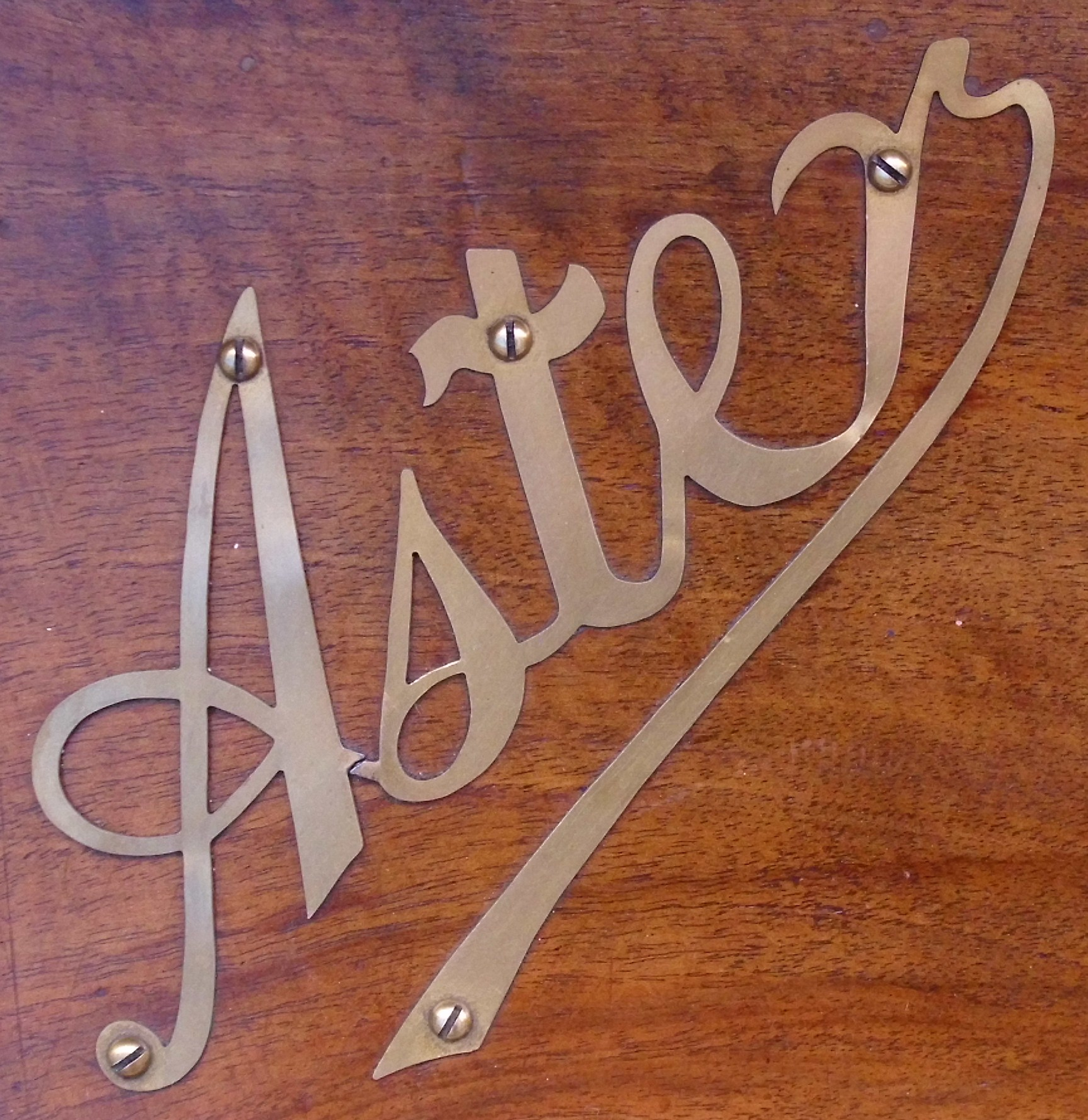
Emblem

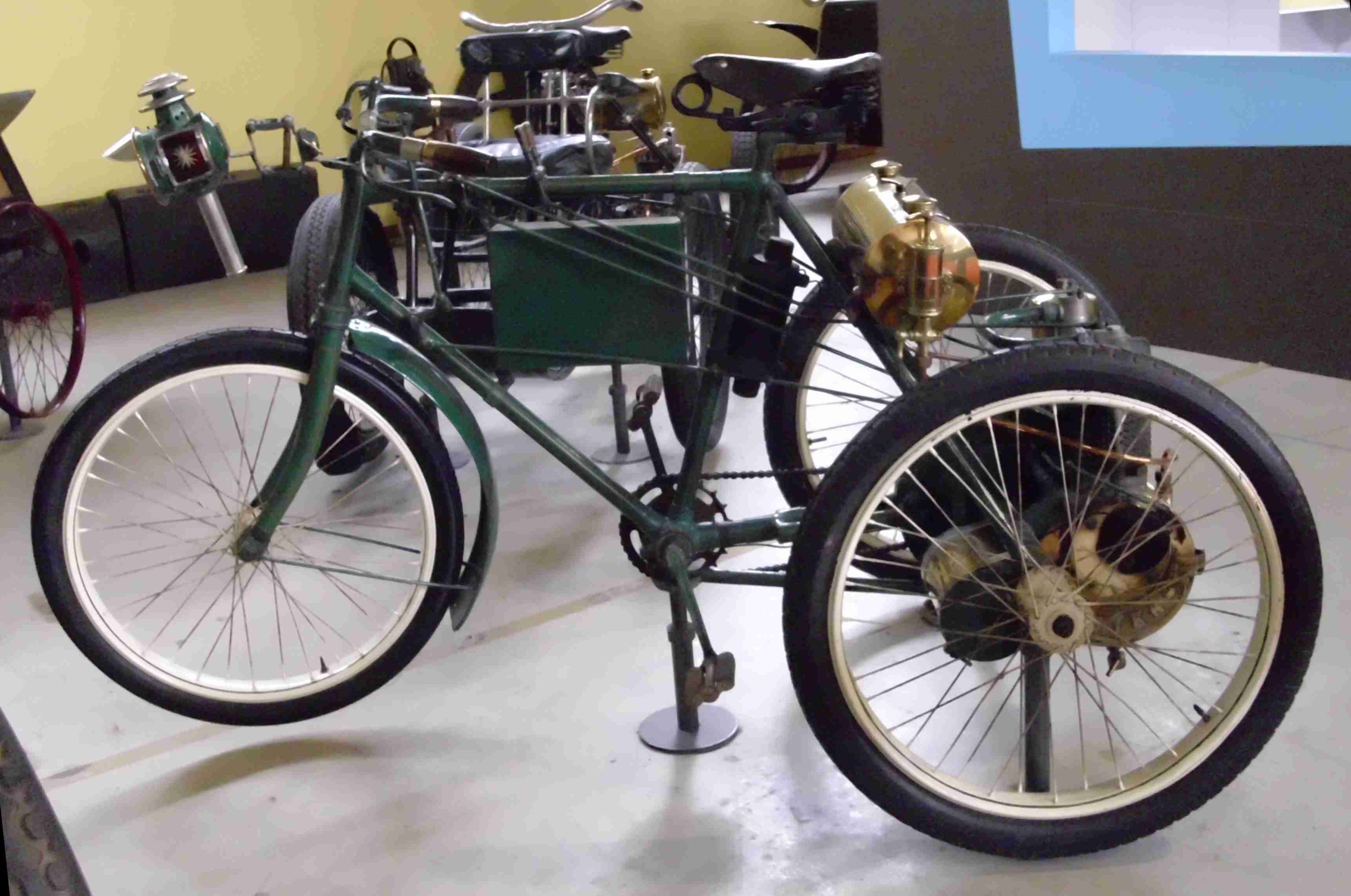
Aster motorised tricycle 1899

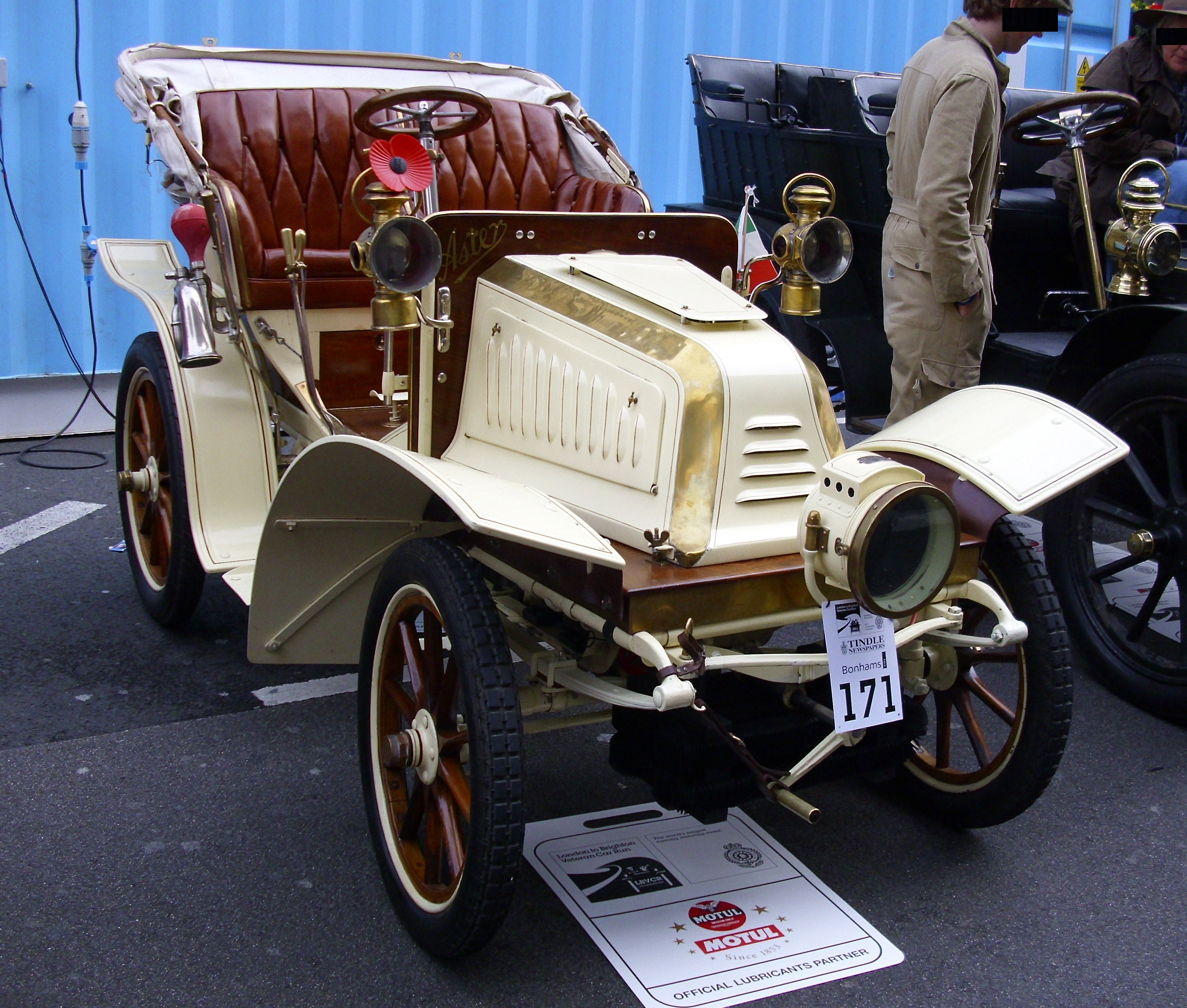
Aster automobile 1902

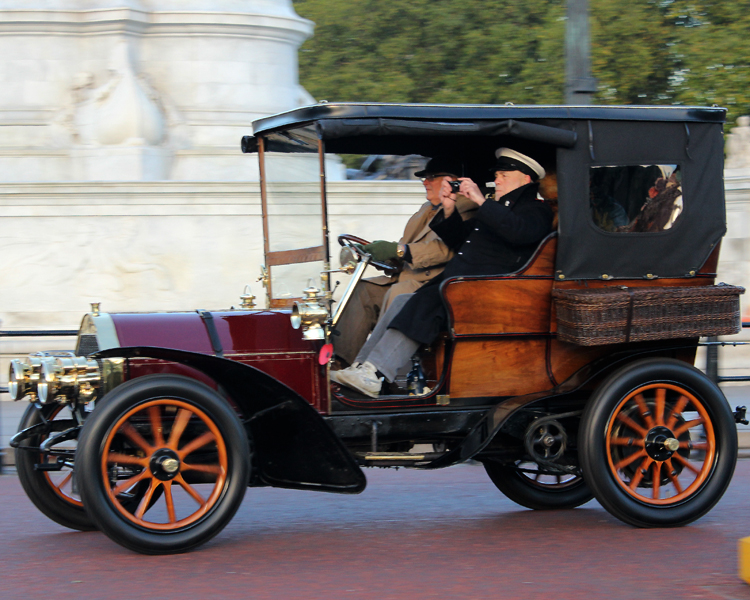
Aster 20HP Tonneau 1904

L'Aster, Aster, Ateliers de Construction Mecanique l'Aster, was a French manufacturer of automobiles and the leading supplier of engines to other manufacturers from the late 1890s until circa 1910/12. Although primarily known as an engine mass manufacturer the company also produced chassis for coach-works and a complete range of components.

Aster produced a range of engines including: stationary motors; electricity generators; automobile motors; marine engines and aero engines. There were air-cooled and water cooled Gasoline motors, Kerosene motors, and Gas Motors. Among the companies for which Aster produced engines and other parts were Ache Frères, Achilles, Argyll, Ariès, Aster-Newey, Automobiles Barré, Bolide, Belhaven, Bij 't Vuur, Century, Clément, Darracq, Dennis, Durham-Churchill, Ernst, Excelsior, Gladiator, Hanzer, Hoflack, Hurtu, Korn et Latil, Lacoste & Battmann, La Torpille, Lucerna, Newey Aster, Société Parisienne, Passy-Thellier, Pearson, Prunel, Rochet, Rouxel, Reyrol, Sage, Siddeley-Deasy, Simplicia, Singer, Swift, Vulcan, West-Aster, Whippet, Whitlock. and Le Zèbre. By 1906 Aster was able to claim over 11,000 users of their engines.

From the mid-1900s 'Aster-Wembley' manufactured engines under license in Wembley (London) UK. In 1913 this became the 'Aster Engineering Co' which produced aircraft engines during the First World War, and then in 1922 started production of Aster cars. By 1927 it had been absorbed into Arrol Johnston. In Italy, the Aster Società Italiana Motori supplied and built both cars and engines under licence from 1906-1908.

In 1904 the Parisian newspaper Le Petit Journal stated that Aster monopolised the mass manufacture of engines in France, and had a 'universal reputation' and success shown by innumerable users. By 1912 they claimed to cater for over 130 makes.

== History ==
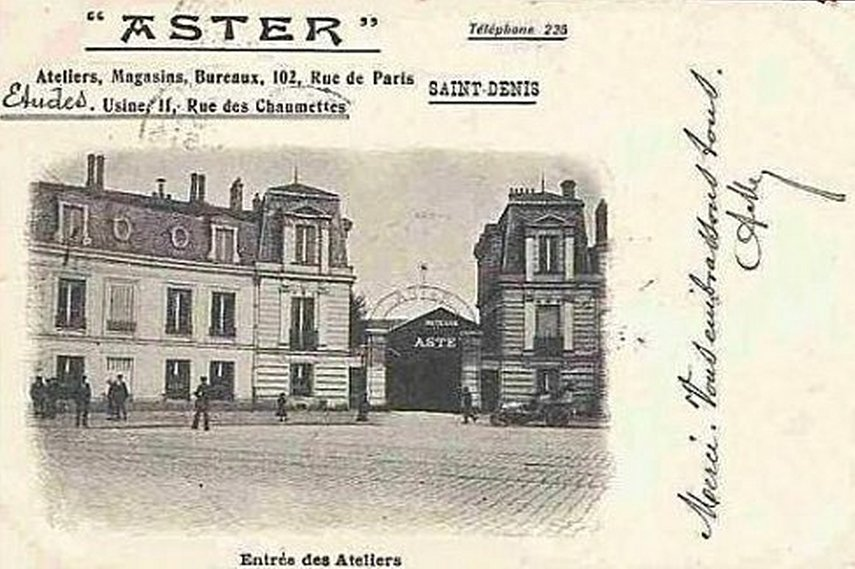
A postcard of the 'Entrance to the Factory' at 102 rue de Paris, Saint Denis

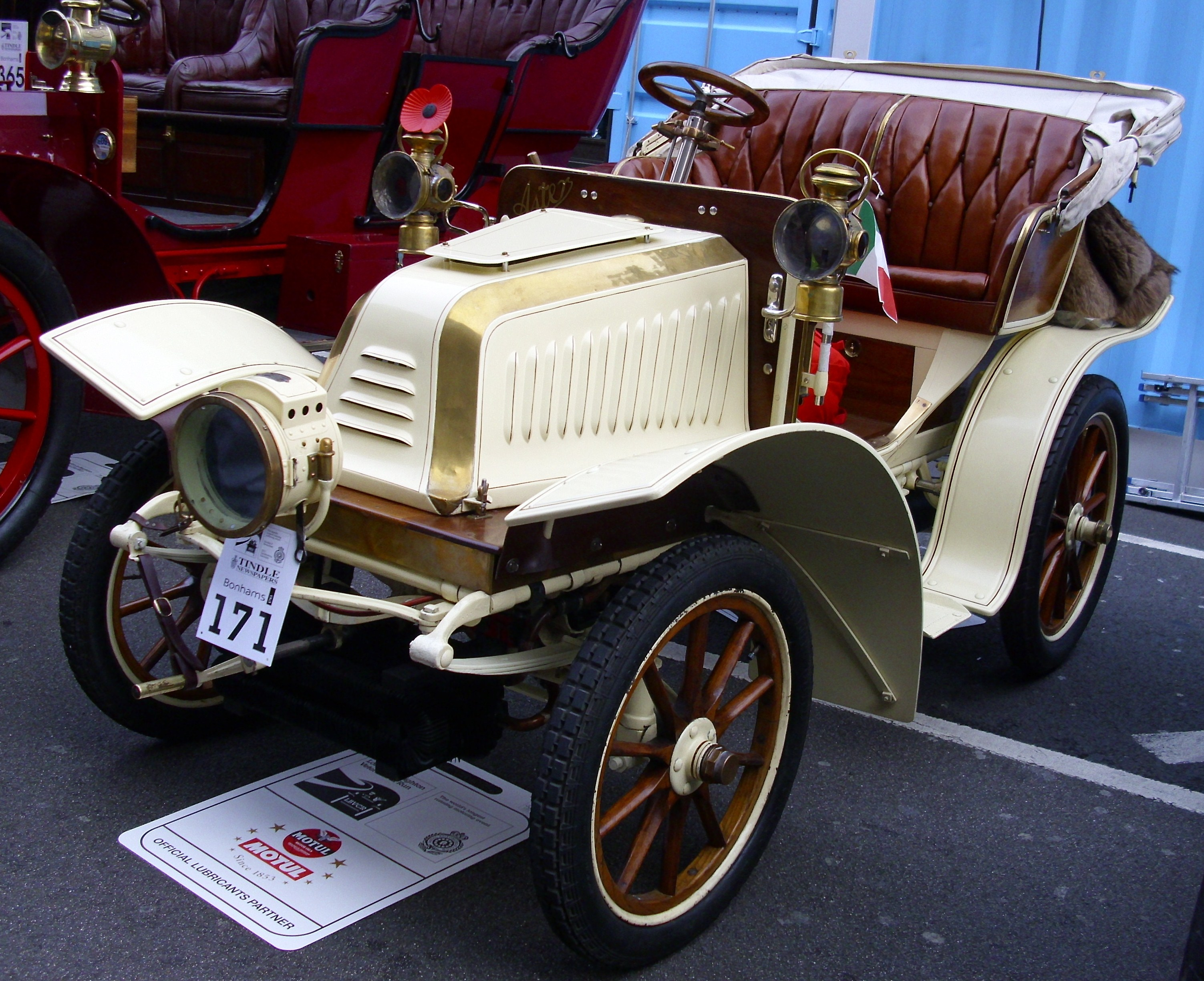
Aster automobile 1902

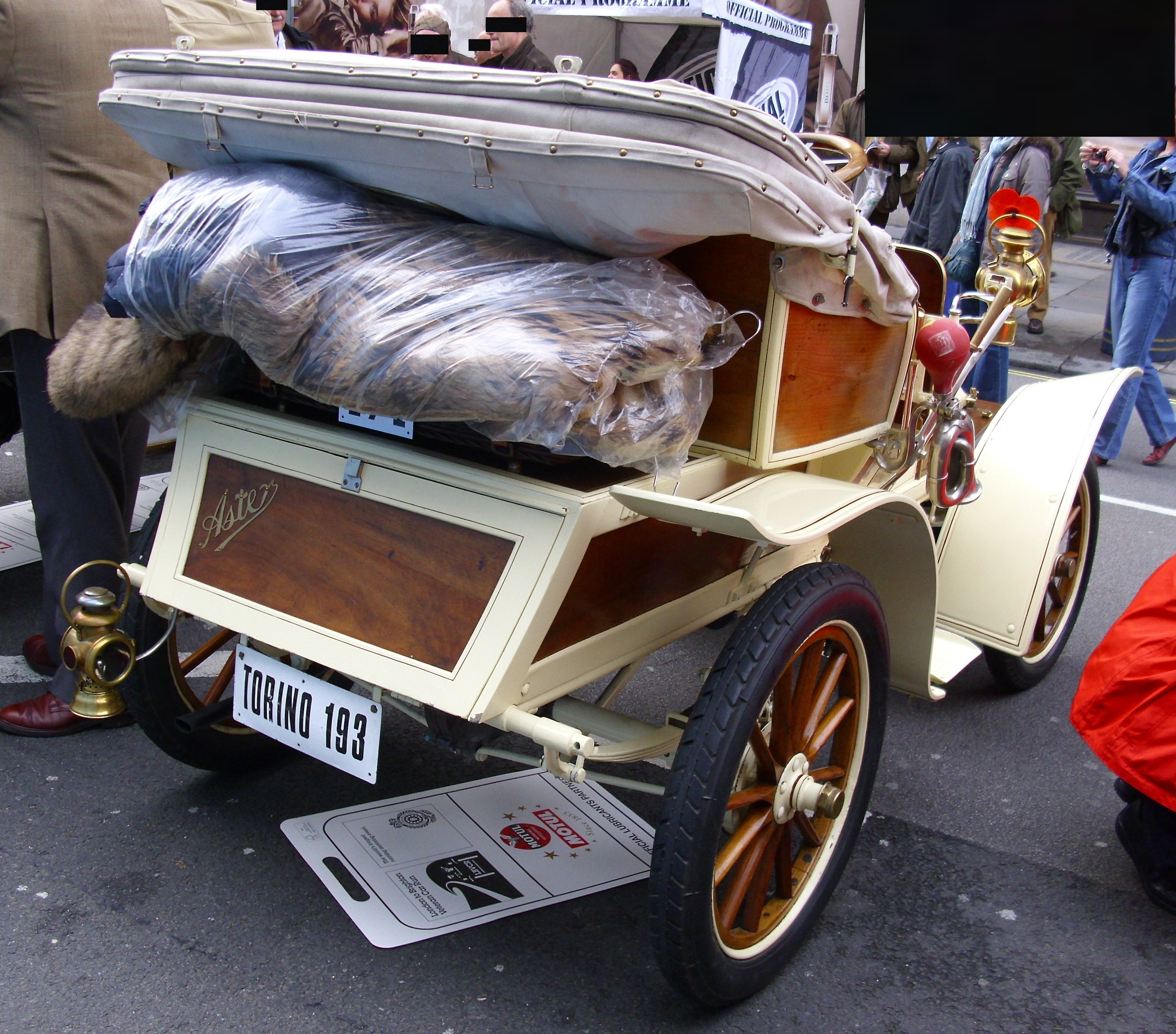
Aster automobile 1902

Aster was a French manufacturer of automobiles and the leading supplier of engines to other manufacturers from 1900 to 1910. Although primarily known as an engine mass manufacturer the company also produced chassis for coachworks.

In 1878 the Aster company was established at 102 rue de Paris, Saint-Denis. Engine id plates stated 'Ateliers de Construction Mécanique l'Aster. 74, Rue de la Victoire, Paris (the registered office), Usines à St Denis (Seine) (The factory).

At the 1900 'Salon de l'Auto' in Paris Aster exhibited a motor quadricycle equipped with their own 3.5 HP, single cylinder engine. The expanding range included : stationary motors; electricity generator; automobile motors and marine launch motors. There were air-cooled and water cooled Gasoline motors, Kerosene motors, and Gas Motors.

A 12 h.p. Aster was exhibited at the 1903 Crystal Palace Motor Show and a range of Aster cars was sold in Britain between 1905 and 1907.

In Italy the Aster Società Italiana Motori supplied cars and engines from 1906-1908 under licence.

Aster had manufacturing capabilities in Wembley, North London, UK which both traded and stamped the engines as Aster-Wembley. Begbie Manufacturing of Wembley was founded in 1899 by Sydney D Begbie (A.M.I.M.E.) and in the mid-1900s became British licensees of Aster, making mainly stationary engines. In 1913 they became Aster Engineering Co (1913) Ltd and during the First World War made aircraft engines. In 1922 they began producing Aster automobiles. From 1927 they were absorbed into Arrol Johnston & Aster Eng, Dumfries Scotland GB. The last Aster engines were made in 1930 by Meadows.

Sydney D Begbie (A.M.I.M.E.) worked as the 'Resident Engineer' of Aster, St. Denis, in Paris during the 1900s. He was an early cyclist, world record holder, and pioneer in the motor engineering business. He was Managing Director of the Begbie Manufacturing Co., Ltd of Wembley, which became the British licensee of Aster. Begbie also worked as Consulting Engineer to Henry Whitlock, Ltd. and The West London Motor Co. Ltd, both of whom were users of Aster engines.

== Automobiles ==
At the 1900 'Salon de l'Auto' in Paris Aster exhibited a motor quadricycle equipped with their own 3.5 HP, single cylinder engine. Engine sizes and multi-cylinder engines were progressively developed.

A 12 h.p. Aster was exhibited at the 1903 Crystal Palace Motor Show and a range of Aster cars was sold in Britain between 1905 and 1907.

In 1904 Aster produced a 16/20 h.p. four-cylinder, five seat automobile with rear-entrance and Tonneau, with a Type 43 JS engine.

In Italy, the Aster Società Italiana Motori supplied cars and engines from 1906-1908 under licence.

The 'Ateliers de Construction Mecanique l'Aster' from St. Denis (Seine) exhibited a four-cylinder chassis at the 1907 Paris Salon.

== Engines ==
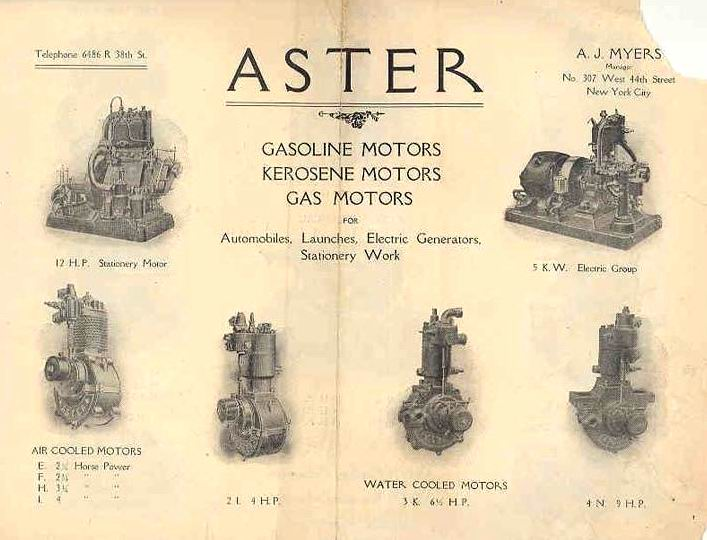
Brochure for Aster engines showing Stationary motor; Electricity generators; Air cooled range; Water cooled range; and listing Gasoline motors, Kerosene motors and Gas Motors for Automobiles, Heavy Duty, Motor launches, Electric generators and stationary work. Distributed in the USA by 'A J Myers', New York.

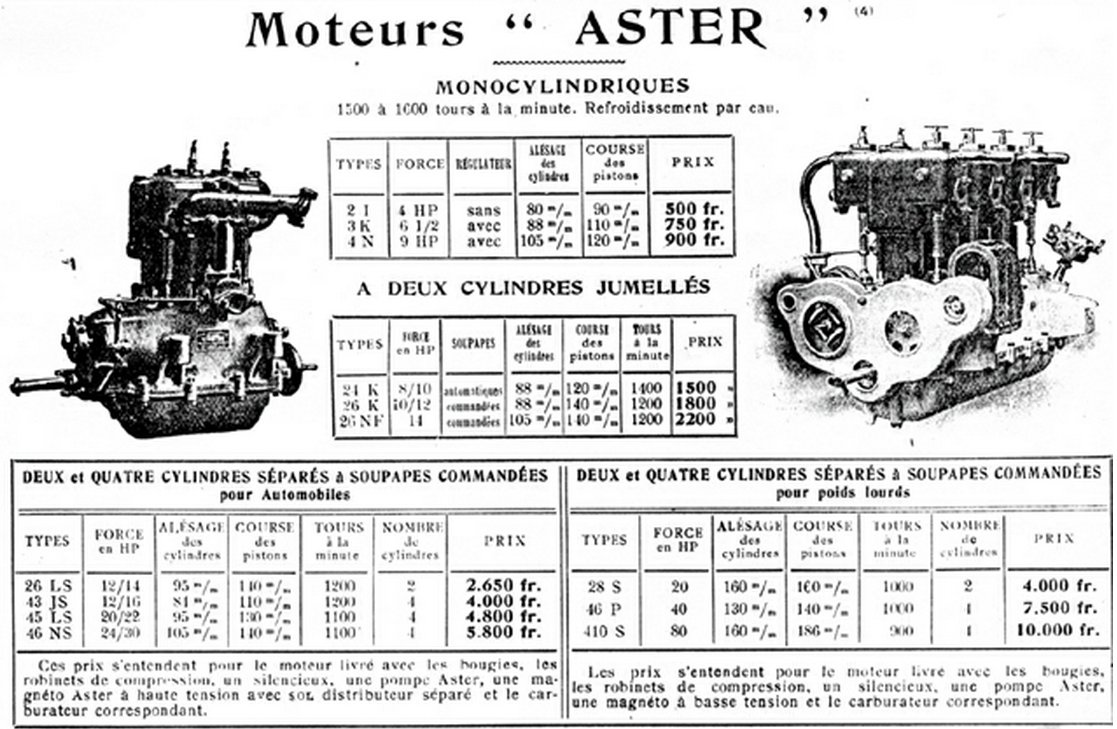
Commercial advert for Aster engines published 1908/9 : Single cylinder Two cylinder twins Two and Four cylinder with poppet valves - for automobiles Two and Four cylinder with poppet valves - for heavy loads

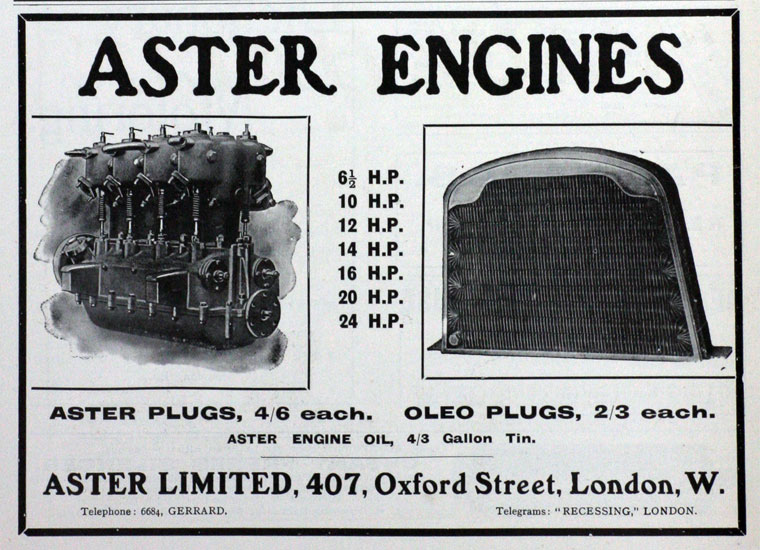
Aster Ltd, Oxford Street, Advertisement showing engine list, September 1905

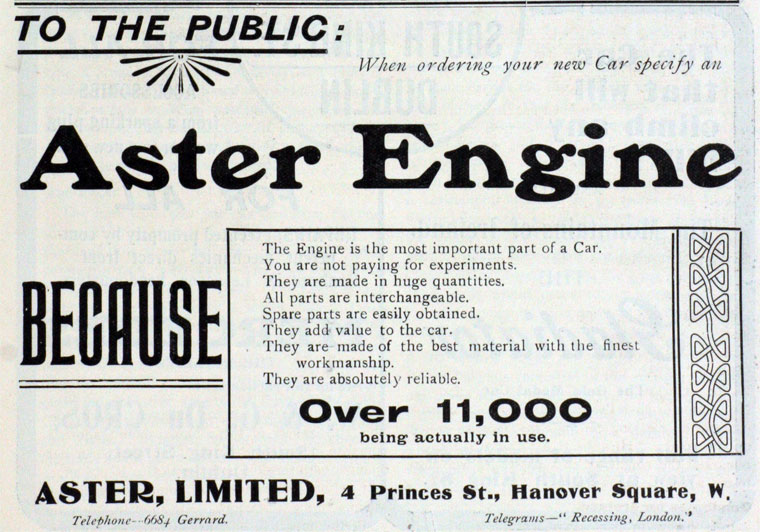
Aster - Hanover Square, Commercial advertisement claiming 11,000 users, March 1906

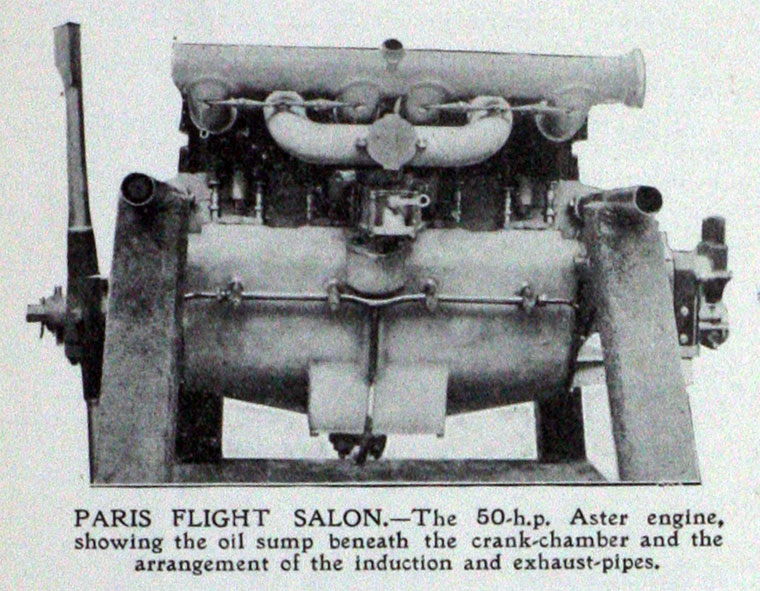
Aster advertisement for 1909 Paris Flight show, 50 hp aero engine

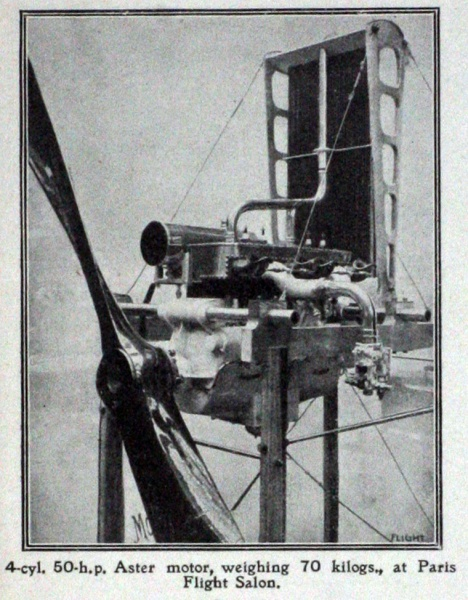
Aster display, Paris Flight show, 50 hp aero engine, 1910

Aster produced a range of engines including: stationary motors; electricity generators; automobile motors, heavy duty motors, marine launch motors and aero engines. There were air-cooled and water cooled options plus Gasoline motors, Kerosene motors, and Gas Motors.

This list is provisional and may contain overlapping data. You can help to rationalise it with fully sourced information

Power	Type	Capacity Bore / Stroke	Name	Vehicle
	Four cylinders	3,054 cc		1904 Argyll
	Four cylinders	4,849 cc.		1904 Argyll
		16,000 cc		Aster-Wembley, circa 1907 four cylinder
3.5 h.p.	Air cooled		Type E	1900 Aster; 1901 Korn et Latil; 1903 Whippet; Described in New York brochure
3.5 h.p.	Air cooled		Type F	Described in New York brochure
1.5 h.p.	Air cooled		Type H	Described in New York brochure
4 h.p.				1904 Pearson motorcycle;
5 h.p.	Single cylinder Air-cooled	84 x 90, 499cc	Type J	1904 Century Tandem forecar;
12 h.p.	Water cooled			Stationary motor. Described in New York brochure
4 h.p.	Water cooled		Type 2 L	Described in New York brochure
.	Water cooled			5 K.W. Electric group. Described in New York brochure
4 h.p.	Single cylinder Water cooled	80 x 90; 452cc	Type 2 I	without regulator, 1,000-1,500 rpm, 500 francs, Described in New York brochure Described in 1908 French brochure;
6.5 h.p.	Single cylinder Water cooled	88 x 110; 669cc	Type 3 K	with regulator, 1,000-1,500 rpm, 750 francs, 1904 Century Tandem forecar with 'Begbie Audin' radiator; Described in New York brochure Described in 1908 French brochure
8 h.p.				Achilles;
9 h.p.				Achilles; 1902 Bij 't Vuur;
9 h.p.	Single cylinder Water cooled	105 x 120; 1,039cc	Type 4 N	with regulator, 1,000-1,500 rpm, 900 francs, Described in New York brochure Described in 1908 French brochure
8/10 h.p.	Two cylinders, twin casting Water cooled	88 x 120; 1,460cc	Type 21 K,	with regulator, 1,500 francs, Described in 1908 French brochure
10 h.p.				1904 Argyll
10/12 h.p.	Two cylinders, twin casting Water cooled poppet valves	88 x 140; 1,703cc	Type 26 K	Automatic regulator, 1,200 rpm, 1,800 francs, 1905 Whippet; 1906 Durham-Churchill; Described in 1908 French brochure 1912 Vulcan
12 h.p.				Achilles; 1902 Bij 't Vuur; 1903-1907 Aster; 1905 Whippet;
14 h.p.	Two cylinders, twin casting Water cooled poppet valves	105 x 140; 2,424cc	Type 26 NF	automatic regulator, 1,200 rpm, 2,200 francs, Described in 1908 French brochure
12-14 h.p.				1905 twin cylinder Whippet;
12-14 h.p.	four-cylinders	2.4 litre		1906 Durham-Churchill; 1906 2.4 litre Singer;
12/14 h.p.	Two cylinders, separate castings Water cooled poppet valves	95 x 110; 1,559cc	Type 26 LS	1,200 rpm, 2,650 francs, Described in 1908 French brochure - for automobiles
12/16 h.p. (and 16/20)	Four cylinders, separate castings Water cooled poppet valves	81 x 110; 2,267cc	Type 43 JS	1,200 rpm, 4,000 francs, Described in 1908 French brochure - for automobiles 1904 Aster 16/20 h.p. five seat automobile with rear-entrance and Tonneau.
18 h.p.				1905 Whippet;
20/22 h.p.	Four cylinders, separate castings Water cooled poppet valves	95 x 130; 3,686cc	Type 45 LS	1,100 rpm, 4,800 francs 1904 Argyll; 1906 Durham-Churchill, 24 seater; Described in 1908 French brochure - for automobiles
24/30 h.p.	Four cylinders, separate castings Water cooled poppet valves	105 x 110; 3,810cc	Type 46 NS	1,100 rpm, 5,800 francs, Described in 1908 French brochure - for automobiles
30 h.p.				1908 Durham-Churchill, 26 seater
20 h.p.	Two cylinders, separate castings Water cooled poppet valves	160 x 160; 6,434cc	Type 28 S	1,000 rpm, 4,000 francs, Described in 1908 French brochure - for Heavy Loads
24 h.p.	four-cylinders			1905 Durham-Churchill; 1905 Whippet;
40 h.p.	Four cylinders, integrated casting Water cooled poppet valves	130 x 140; 7,433cc	Type 46 P	1,000 rpm, 7,500 francs, Described in 1908 French brochure - for Heavy Loads
80 h.p.	Four cylinders, separate castings Water cooled poppet valves	160 x 186; 14,959cc	Type 410 S	900 rpm, 10,000 francs, Described in 1908 French brochure - for Heavy Loads
50 h.p.	Four cylinders Water cooled			70 kg aero engine Shown at 1909 Paris Flight Show

Note : The Type letters are an Aster code: I = 80mm cylinder bore, J = 84mm cylinder bore, K = 88mm cylinder bore, L = 95mm cylinder bore, N = 105mm cylinder bore, S = separate cylinders,

== Components ==
Aster was a major supplier of automobile components to both vehicle manufacturers and end users. As shown in its advertising and exhibition stands, both the French parent and the English associate were suppliers of : engines, gear boxes, gears, chassis, steering gear, radiators, spark plugs, magnetos, coils, accumulators, Oleo plugs, C.M.F. and lubricators.

== Partners ==
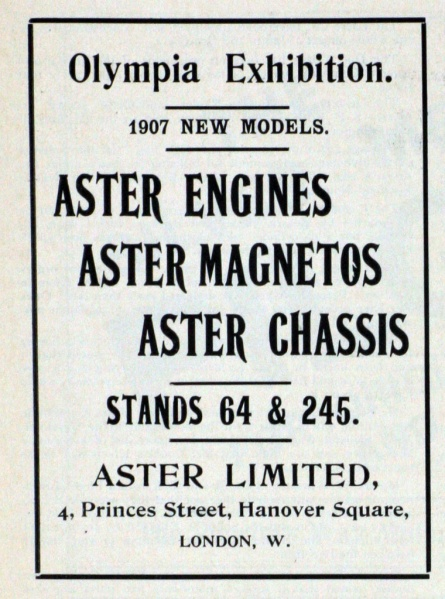
Aster advert, Olympia exhibition November 1906, 1907 models, engines, magnetos, chassis

On 11 July 1904 the Parisian newspaper Le Petit Journal stated that the mass manufacture of engines was monopolised in France by Aster, the only brand specialising in manufacturing engines, and which had a 'universal reputation' and success shown by innumerable users. (Note: Le Petit Journal (11 July 1904, page 5) stated that : Motoring - The mass manufacture of engines is monopolised in France by Aster, the only brand specialising in this manufacture in which it has acquired a 'universal reputation' and success shown by innumerable users. / Automobilisme - La construction des moteurs en très grande série est, pour ainsi dire, monopolisée en France par la marque Aster, la seule marque spécialisée en cette fabrication, dans laquelle elle a acquis une reputation universelle. Les succès des moteurs Aster ne se comptent plus.)

In 1912 the French and English Aster factories claimed that they catered for over 130 vehicle makes.

=== Achilles ===
A range of Achilles cars were advertised, mostly with single-cylinder engines by Aster and De Dion. At least 5 different models were produced including the 8 h.p., 9 h.p. and 12 h.p.

=== Argyll ===
In 1904 the Argyll company of Scotland introduced a range of Aster-engined cars with a front radiator. One of these was a 10 h.p. of 1985 cc; others were fours of 3054 cc, 3686 cc, and 4849 cc.

In 1908, the Argyll 40 was the first model with an entirely French Aster engine. It won its class in the Scottish Reliability trials.

=== Ariès ===
The Ariès was a French automobile manufactured from 1903 to 1938. The first cars were equipped with two- and four-cylinder Aster engines. These shaft-drive cars had an unusual double rear axle.

=== Belhaven ===
Belhaven built steam and petrol-engined vehicles from 1908 at their 'Belhaven Engineering and Motors' works in Wishaw Scotland. The petrol-powered, chain driven lorries (trucks) initially used Tyler engines, then latterly Aster units.

=== Bij 't Vuur ===
The Bij 't Vuur was a Dutch automobile manufactured from 1902 until 1906. The first cars had Aster engines but later ones used De Dion-Bouton or Panhard units. In 1902 a 9 h.p. and a 12 h.p. -version were offered, which had a quite modern cardan axle with three gears forward and one backwards.

=== Century ===
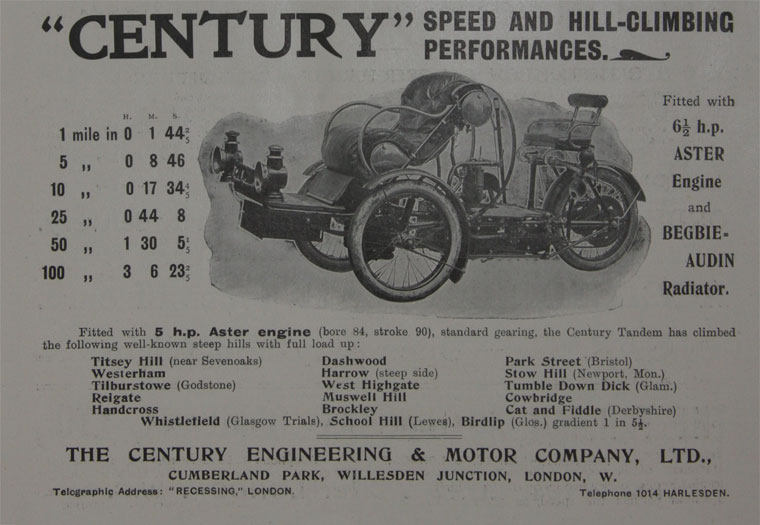
1902 Century advert - tandem forecar with Aster engine

'Century Engineering and Motor Co' of Willesden Junction, London produced motorcycles from 1902 to 1905. In 1904 their Tandem forecar model was equipped with either a 5 h.p. Aster engine, (or 6.5 h.p. with 'Begbie Audin' water cooled radiator) driving a countershaft by chain. The rear axle was driven by one of two chains, to give high and low speeds. A tradesman's carrier model was also listed.

=== Darracq ===
In 1896 Alexandre Darracq founded the 'Societe Alexandre Darracq Suresnes' to build motorised cycles. The first models were Perfecta tricycles and quadricycles, made under licence from Léon Bollée and equipped with Aster engines.

=== Durham-Churchill (Hallamshire) ===
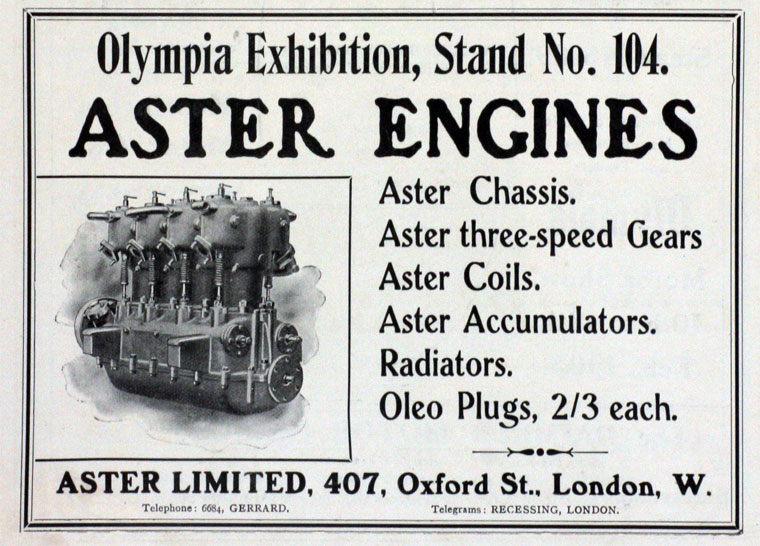
Advertisement from February 1905 for the Olympia Exhibition. Aster engines, chassis, gears, coils, accumulators.

Durham-Churchill of Grimesthorpe near Sheffield manufactured charabancs as 'Hallamshire Cars' from 1903 until 1917. In 1905, they displayed a 24-seater charabanc powered by a four-cylinder 24 h.p. Aster engine. It drove the rear axle via a Champion clutch and four-speed gearbox. It was launched at the Royal Agricultural Hall Show at a cost of £600. In 1906 they also used Aster engines in their range of cars: the two-cylinder 10–12 h.p. and four-cylinder 12–14 h.p.; 20 h.p.; and 24 h.p. models. By 1908, their 26-seater charabanc was powered by a 30 h.p. Aster engine.

=== Excelsior ===
From January 1904, the Belgian Manufacturer Excelsior (The Belgian Bentley) built a few cars equipped with a reinforced wooden frame and fitted with Aster engines, single, twin and four cylinders. The first models were powered by a two- or four-cylinder Aster engine; this was considered nothing special however.

=== Gladiator ===
The Gladiator Cycle Company, Clément-Gladiator (from 1896), was a French manufacturer of bicycles, motorcycles and cars based in Le Pré-Saint-Gervais, Seine. In 1899 they launched a motor car with a front-mounted Aster engine, steering wheel, two-speed transmission by foot pedals and final drive by chain. By 1902 Gladiator manufactured its own four-cylinder engines.

=== Horley Motor & Engineering Co. Ltd ===
The Horley Motor & Engineering Co. Ltd, used Aster engines in their vans from 1908-1909.

=== Korn et Latil ===
The Korn et Latil was a French automobile manufactured from 1901 until 1902. It was a voiturette with a 3½ h.p. Aster engine.

=== Lewis ===
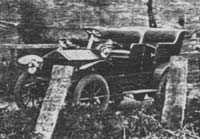
Lewis-Aster outside the Lewis Cycle and Motor Works on McHenry Street, Adelaide. 1900s

Vivian Lewis began the 'Ormonde Bicycle Depot' on Freeman Street, Adelaide in 1893. In November 1900, the Lewis Cycle and Motor Works on McHenry Street, Adelaide produced the first Lewis car. By the mid-1900s they produced the 'Lewis-Aster' but the quantity is currently unknown.

=== Newey-Aster ===
Gordon Newey manufactured three models of motorcar with Aster engines: 10/12 HP, 20/22 HP and 24/30 HP, plus trucks which could carry a 500 kg payload.

=== Orient Aster ===
In 1898 or 1899 Charles Metz of the Metz Company of Waltham, Massachusetts built the first US produced motorcycle. It used an Aster engine which was a copy of De Dion-Bouton's small, light, high reviving four-stroke single with battery and coil ignition.

=== Parsons Biplane ===
The Parsons biplane was built in May 1913 by J.G. Parsons and Percy Maxwell Muller as an engineering test-bed for the Parsons Pendulum Paddle-Wheel Stabilizer. The first model was initially fitted with an Aster 40 h.p. four-cylinder, inline, water-cooled, engine driving an 8 ft 2in diameter Normale propeller, but it was replaced by a Gnome engine by July 1913.

=== Pearson ===
The Pearson (motorcycle) was a British motorcycle manufactured by the Pearson brothers of Southsea, Hampshire, in 1904. It was equipped with a 4 h.p. Aster engine mounted in a 'loop and diamond' frame.

=== Phébus-Aster ===
Noe Boyer & Cie, from Suresnes, Paris, named their 1899-1903 Automobilette after Phoebus, the Greek god who drove the sun across the heavens each day. It was powered by a 3.5 hp Aster engine. Charles Jarrott, partnered by F.F. Wellington, achieved 38 mph at the Crystal Palace velodrome, establishing Aster-engined Phebus tricycles as fast and powerful. Wellington was the English importer of Phebus tricycles and voiturettes. The two-speed voiturette was powered by a rear-mounted single-cylinder 397cc Aster engine.

=== Rouxel ===
The Rouxel was a French automobile manufactured from 1899 until 1900. The company produced two models, including a two-speed voiturette with 2½ h.p. Aster engine.

=== Siddeley-Deasy ===
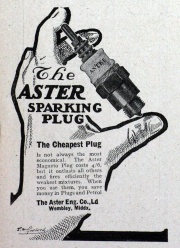
Aster-Wembley Spark plug - 1910

Siddeley-Deasy used Rover chassis and Daimler and Aster engines.

=== Simplicia ===
The Simplicia was a French automobile manufactured only in 1910. It used a 10/12 h.p. Aster engine.

=== Singer ===
Singer made their first four-wheel car in 1905. The first Singer-designed car was fitted with an Aster 4-cylinder 2.4 litre 12/14 in 1906. For 1907 a range of two-, three- and four-cylinder models using White and Poppe engines launched. The Aster engined models were dropped in 1909.

=== West Aster ===
Enoch John West started building cars in Coventry, England under the name of 'The Progress Cycle co' in 1900. but in 1903 it went bankrupt so he founded West and West-Aster which produced cars from 1904 with Aster engines, but by 1908 (or 1910) the company had failed.

The guide to the 1906 Olympia Motor Show described the West-Aster thus :

A car which attracted our attention by reason of its up-to-date construction and reasonable price was the "West" made by West, Ltd, of South Molton Street, Bond Street, London, W. It is fitted with the celebrated Aster engine, which carries the Aster Company's guarantee. It is otherwise made in Coventry, and good, sound construction is put into every part.

=== Whippet Motor and Cycle Co ===
The Whippet Motor and Cycle Co produced Whippet motorcycles from 1903 to 1905. Two machines were exhibited at the late-1903 Crystal Palace show, of which the forecar was fitted with a 3.25 h.p. Aster engine. It also had two-speed gearing using two chain wheels of different diameters, fitted to the rear hub and a device to shift the drive chain from one to the other, just as on a bicycle.

=== Whitlock ===
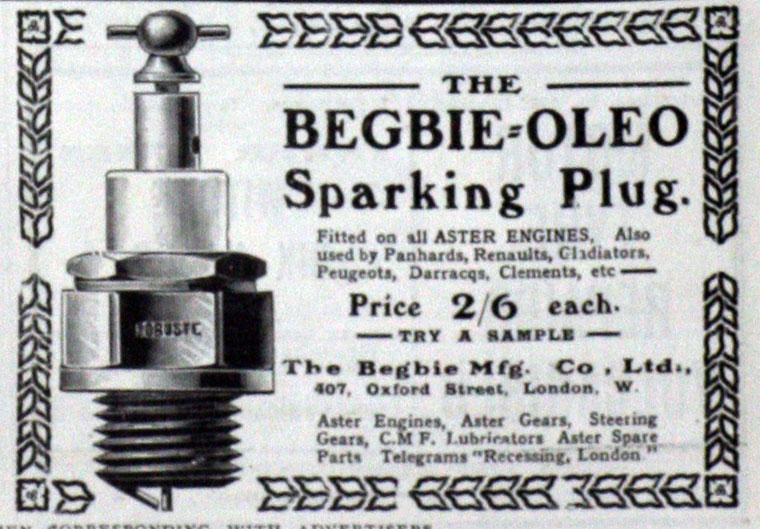
Advert for Begbie Oleo sparking plugs from May 1904, fitted on all Aster engines

The Whitlock company, based in Holland Park London, moved into the car industry in 1903 when they rebadged a 'Century' car manufactured in Willesden, London as a 'Whitlock Century'. (See 'Century' above).

In 1905 'The Whitlock Automobile Company' was formed to market Whitlock-Aster cars. They produced a 10-12 h.p.; a 12 h.p.; a 12-14 h.p. twin cylinder with shaft drive; an 18 h.p. and a 24 h.p. model, which were listed as of French manufacture. The cars reportedly were well received but cannot have been a commercial success as the company closed down in 1906.

=== Vulcan ===
Vulcan was an English manufacturer of cars from 1902 until 1928. The company built a range of engines for the early models, but in 1912 their new small car, the 10/12, was equipped with a 1.8 L two-cylinder Aster engine, the first use of a bought in engine.

== See also ==
- Arrol-Aster
- Arrol-Johnston
- Aster (automobile)
