= Aster (automobile) =

For the French Aster automobile manufacturer of 1900-1910, see Ateliers de Construction Mecanique l'Aster

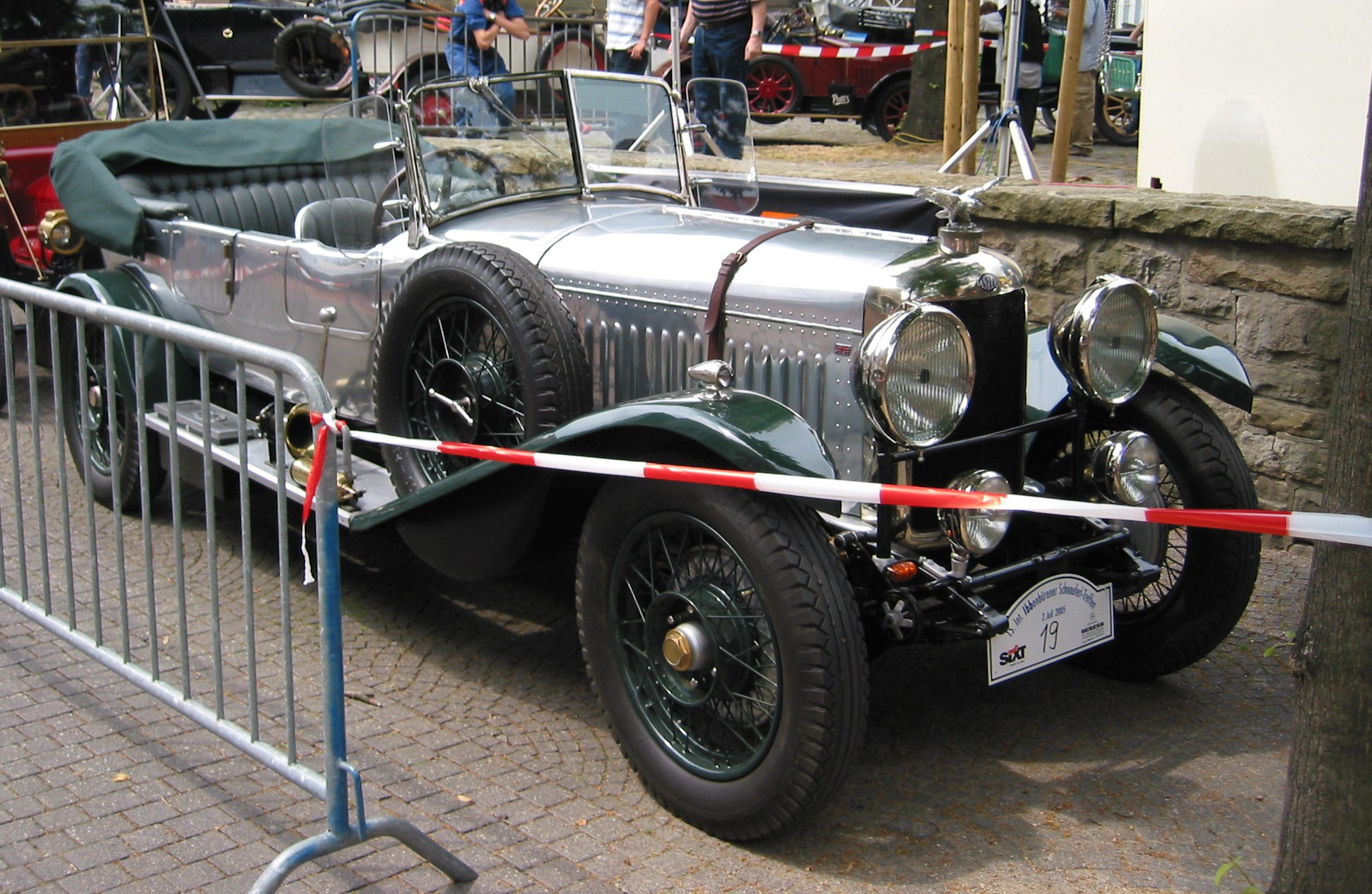
Aster

The Aster was an English automobile manufactured from 1922 to 1930. The company's car roots can be traced to 1899 when Begbie Manufacturing of Wembley, in north London became British licensees of the French Aster company (Ateliers de Construction Mecanique l'Aster) making mainly stationary engines. In 1913 they became Aster Engineering Co (1913) Ltd and during World War I made aircraft engines.

== Models ==
=== 18/50, 20/55, 21/60 ===
The first Aster cars were made in 1922 with the luxurious 18/50, which had a 2618 cc six cylinder overhead valve engine driving the rear wheels through a four speed gearbox. The 126 inch wheelbase chassis had semi elliptic springing at the front and cantilevered springs at the rear with four wheel brakes as an early option. The car was listed at £850 in 1923 and about 50 were made before in 1924 the engine was enlarged to 2890 cc by increasing its bore from 69.5 to 73 mm in the 20/55 model. One was bought by the Duke of York. About another 50 of the larger cars were made. In 1926 the engine was further bored out to 75 mm, the stroke stayed at 115 mm throughout, making the 3042 cc 21/60.

=== 24/70 ===
The largest car they made was the 1927 24/70 with a 147-inch wheelbase, a foot longer than the 21/60. The 3042 cc engine for this was created by boring the engine a further 5 mm to 80 mm and fitting Burt-McCollum single sleeve valves which were also fitted to the 21/60 engine from that year. The top of the range 39 cwt Landaulette cost £1300. Probably about 70 were made.

== Merger ==
They merged with Arrol-Johnston in 1927 following which production moved to Dumfries, Scotland and the cars became known as Arrol-Asters. The Wembley premises were kept as a service depot eventually being sold to Singer. The 21/60 and 24/70 were kept in production and were joined by a straight eight 3150 cc sleeve valved engine 23/70 and 17/50 six which was also available with Cozette supercharger.

== Receivership ==
The late 1920s were not a good time for luxury car makers and the receivers arrived in 1929. Limited production continued until 1931 when the factory finally closed.

== French Aster ==
The French Aster car company based in Saint-Denis Paris operated between 1900 and circa 1912. They produced their own cars plus engines and gearboxes for other manufacturers. In 1904 the Parisian newspaper Le Petit Journal stated that Aster monopolised the mass manufacture of engines in France, and had a 'universal reputation' and success shown by innumerable users. By 1912 they claimed to cater for over 130 makes. (Note: Le Petit Journal (11 July 1904, page 5) stated that : Motoring - The mass manufacture of engines is monopolised in France by Aster, the only brand specialising in this manufacture in which it has acquired a 'universal reputation' and success shown by innumerable users. / Automobilisme - La construction des moteurs en très grande série est, pour ainsi dire, monopolisée en France par la marque Aster, la seule marque spécialisée en cette fabrication, dans laquelle elle a acquis une reputation universelle. Les succès des moteurs Aster ne se comptent plus.)

A 12 hp Aster was exhibited at the 1903 Crystal Palace Motor Show. A range of Aster cars was sold in Britain between 1905 and 1907.

== See also ==
- Arrol-Johnston
- Arrol-Aster
- List of car manufacturers of the United Kingdom
