= Rouxel (car) =

French car

The Rouxel was a French automobile manufactured from 1899 until 1900. The company produced two models, a De Dion-engined tricycle and a two-speed voiturette with 2½ hp Aster engine.
