= Clément Motor Company =

The Clément Motor Company was established in 1906 by Adolphe Clément-Bayard in Coventry, England, to build Gladiator cars, sometimes known as Clément-Gladiators, under licence. Some of these cars were equipped with engines manufactured nearby in Saint-Denis Paris by Aster in single, twin or four cylinder configurations. The complex inter-relationships of the French and English motor industry at that time (see Adolphe Clément-Bayard - Motor manufacturing) meant that the cars were marketed with the slogan Simply Clément, nothing else to avoid confusion with Clément-Talbots which by then were known only as Talbot. Various sources record that motorcars were manufactured and sold under the Clément brand between 1907 (1908) and 1914. The company is recorded as Clément Motor company Ltd., Coventry, Warwickshire.
