= Arrol-Aster =

British car manufacturer

Arrol-Aster was a British car maker founded in 1927 when Arrol-Johnston and the English Aster company merged. The Wembley, London works of Aster was closed and production concentrated at the Heathhall, Dumfries factory of Arrol-Johnston.

At first, manufacture of all the cars previously made by the two companies was continued along with those made under the Galloway badge but in 1928 a rationalisation was carried out. The cars were complex and expensive and sales were poor resulting in the company going into receivership in 1929 and finally closing in 1931.

The company was responsible for making the body for Sir Malcolm Campbell's Blue Bird car in 1929 and an Arrol-Aster car was entered in the 1931 24 Hours of Le Mans.

== Model range ==
- 1927-1930 Aster 21/60 3042 cc Straight-6 Overhead valve
- 1927-1930 Aster 24/70 3460 cc Straight-6 Sleeve valve
- 1927-1929 Arrol-Johnston 15/40 2413 cc Straight-4 Overhead valve
- 1927-1930 Arrol-Aster 17/50 2370 cc Straight-6 Sleeve valve
- 1929-1930 Arrol-Aster 23/70 3293 cc straight-8 Sleeve valve

== Arrol-Aster 17/50 ==
Arrol-Aster 17/50

Overview
- Production: 1927–1930; 80 approx produced (including 23/70 models)

Body and chassis
- Body style: saloon 4-seat convertible 5-seat coupé

Powertrain
- Engine: 2370 cc Straight-6 Sleeve valve

Dimensions
- Wheelbase: 127 inches (3226 mm)
- Length: 174 inches (4420 mm)
- Width: 68 inches (1727 mm)

The 17/50 used a straight six, single sleeve valve engine of 2370 cc driving the rear wheels through a four speed gearbox. Suspension was by semi elliptic leaf springs at the front and cantilever springs at the rear.

A Cozette supercharger was an optional extra costing GBP50 giving the car a top speed of 72 mph (116 km/h) and an economy of 17 mpg_{‑imp} (17 L/100 km; 14 mpg_{‑US})

The car had a distinctive two-part, V-shaped windscreen and was available with saloon, open touring or coupé bodies.

In 1929, a car was entered into, and completed, the Monte Carlo Rally driven by the Hon Mmrs Victor Bruce, and two supercharged cars were entered for the 1929 RAC Tourist Trophy (TT) in Ulster driven by E.R. Hall and N. Garrard. Both cars crashed.

== Arrol-Aster 23/70 ==
Arrol-Aster 23/70

Overview
- Production: 1927–1930; 80 approx produced (including 17/50 models)

Body and chassis
- Body style: saloon 4-seat convertible 5-seat coupé

Powertrain
- Engine: 3293 cc Straight-8 Sleeve valve

Dimensions
- Wheelbase: 135 inches (3429 mm)
- Length: 183 inches (4648 mm)
- Width: 68 inches (1727 mm)

The 23/70 shared the same basic layout as the 17/50 but was fitted with a straight-8 sleeve valve engine. The exact capacity of the engine is quoted by various sources as between 2760 and 3293 cc. The engine was said to be vulnerable if taken above 3400 rpm. The car could be distinguished from its smaller companion by a large "8" on the radiator grille. A free wheel mechanism was offered as an option.

== See also ==
- Ateliers de Construction Mecanique l'Aster (Original French 'Aster')
- List of car manufacturers of the United Kingdom
