= Whitlock (manufacturing) =

This article may confuse and conflate two (or more) separate English manufacturers of carriages and automobiles and commercial vehicles across the claimed span of 213 years! Please Note: :de: Wikipedia both warns and
differentiates between Whitlock, formerly Lawton, owned by Lawton Goodman Ltd. from 1914 to 1933. (:de:)
and the older Whitlock Aster made by Whitlock Automobile Co. Ltd. 1904-1906 (:de:)
Please help improve this article with clear citations from reliable sources.

The Whitlock company, based in London, England, started as a carriage builder in 1778, moved into the car industry in 1903 and finally closed in 1991.

== History ==
Joseph Whitlock had set up his company making coaches and carriages in Holland Park, London in 1778. They must have been successful as by the start of the twentieth century they described themselves as "Coachbuilders to the Royal Family".

=== 1900s ===
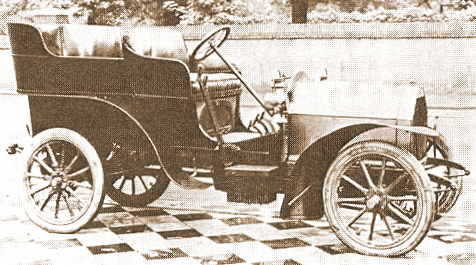
1905 Whitlock-Aster

In 1903 a move into the car business was made when they started to sell the Whitlock Century. They had not built this themselves however, it was a re-badged car from Century Engineering (1885-1907) (Century), a manufacturer in Willesden, London, but they may well have built its body. In 1904 the range was expanded with (probably) engines and chassis from the French Aster (Ateliers de Construction Mecanique l'Aster) company again probably with Whitlock's own coachwork. Aster manufactured engines in Saint-Denis, Paris, in single, twin or four cylinder configurations, and in 1904 they also produced a chassis.

A separate company was formed in 1905 called The Whitlock Automobile Company which continued to market the Whitlock-Aster cars which, although well received, could not have been a commercial success as the company closed down in 1906. Meanwhile, another coachbuilder had been operating in Liverpool founded in 1870 by Jo Lawton and called J A Lawton and Company. It also turned to car body making and in the early 1900s opened a London works run by William Lawton-Goodman, Jo Lawton's nephew. Lawton died in 1913 and left the company in his will to his brother, leaving William with nothing, so he started a new company, Lawton-Goodman Ltd, and took over the defunct name of Whitlock and moved to new premises in Slade Works, Cricklewood, north London. Two new models were announced, initially called Lawtons but rapidly changing to Whitlock. Before production could be established war broke out.

=== First World War ===
During the war years the company concentrated on building ambulances on both its own and other makers' chassis and fuselages for De Havilland DH4 aircraft.

=== 1920s ===
In 1924, a new range of cars was announced still using bought in mechanical components. The smallest was the 11, 12 or 12/35 built until 1925 and using a Coventry Climax (or Coventry Simplex) engine of 1368 cc or an Anzani engine of 1496 cc. Larger was the 14, also called the 16/50, with a six-cylinder 1755 cc or 1991 cc Coventry Climax built from 1924 to 1926 and bigger still the 20/70 with 6-cylinder 2973 cc Meadows engine made from 1926 to 1930. The latter car had a radiator very reminiscent of their near neighbours Bentley. William Lawton-Goodman died in 1932, but his sons carried on the business, turning to commercial vehicle bodies but continuing some car body work.

=== Second World War ===
During the Second World War the company returned again to making ambulances.

=== Post-war ===
With peace in 1945, the company seems to have concentrated on making mobile shops and ice cream vans, continuing to the early 1980s, after which it concentrated on repairs. In 1991, the lease on Slade Works ran out and the company closed.

One Whitlock car is known to survive.

== See also ==
- List of car manufacturers of the United Kingdom
