= Bij 't Vuur =

Bij 't Vuur was a Dutch automobile manufacturer, founded by C. bij 't Vuur in Arnhem in 1902. The production ended in 1905. The name "Bij 't Vuur" means: "By the fire".

The company started out as a coachbuilder, when in 1901 they made their first car. With the car Bij 't Vuur took part in the Toer door Nederland (Tour of The Netherlands, one of the first initiatives in the Netherlands to promote cars), after which it was sold. The first cars had Aster engines but later ones used engines by De Dion-Bouton or Panhard et Levassor.

In 1902 a 9 HP and a 12 HP-version were offered, which had a quite modern cardan axle with three gears forward and one backwards.

At the RAI Motor Show of 1905 Bij 't Vuur showed a car with a self-built engine. Later that year Bij 't Vuur built three busses, but Bij 't Vuur was declared bankrupt before these were delivered. In total about 25 cars were produced.
