= Aster Società Italiana Motori =

Italian automobile manufacturer

Aster Società Italiana Motori was an Italian manufacturer of automobiles from 1906 to 1908. It was founded by the French manufacturer of Aster cars and engines, Ateliers de Construction Mecanique l'Aster.

== History ==
The company based in Milan, began in 1906 with the sales of the French parents engines and subsequently built small numbers of Aster automobiles under license. In 1908 the company was dissolved.

== Vehicle ==
The only model had a 2300cc six cylinder engine that developed 30 hp.

== See also ==
- List of Italian companies

== Bibliography ==
- Harald Linz and Halwart Schrader: The International Automobile Encyclopedia. United Soft Media Verlag GmbH, München 2008, ISBN 978-3-8032-9876-8
- Autorenkollektiv: Enzyklopädie des Automobils. Models, Brands and Technology. Weltbild Verlag, Augsburg, 1989
