= Achilles (automobile) =

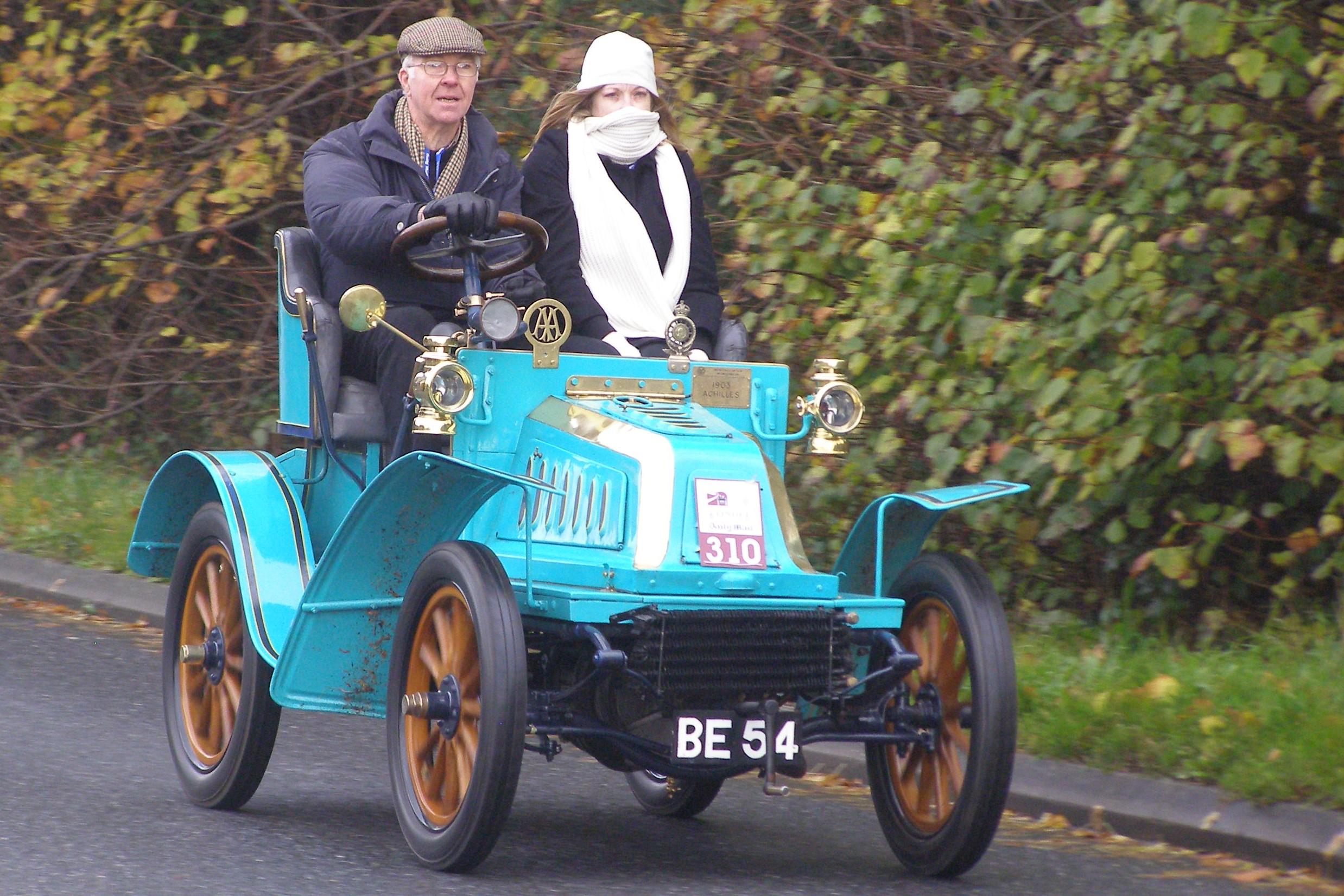
1903 Achilles BE 54 on the 2008 London to Brighton veteran car run

The Achilles was an English shaft drive voiturette manufactured by B Thompson & Co. in Frome, Somerset between 1903 and 1908.

A range of cars were advertised, mostly with single-cylinder engines by Aster and De Dion. Other mechanical parts were also bought in, and it seems likely that only the bodies were originated by Achilles. At least 5 different models were produced, including the 8 hp, 9 hp and 12 hp.

This car is notably seen in the French comic book Achille Talon, created by Michel Regnier (pseudonym: Greg) for the Pilote redaction.
