= Barré (automobile) =

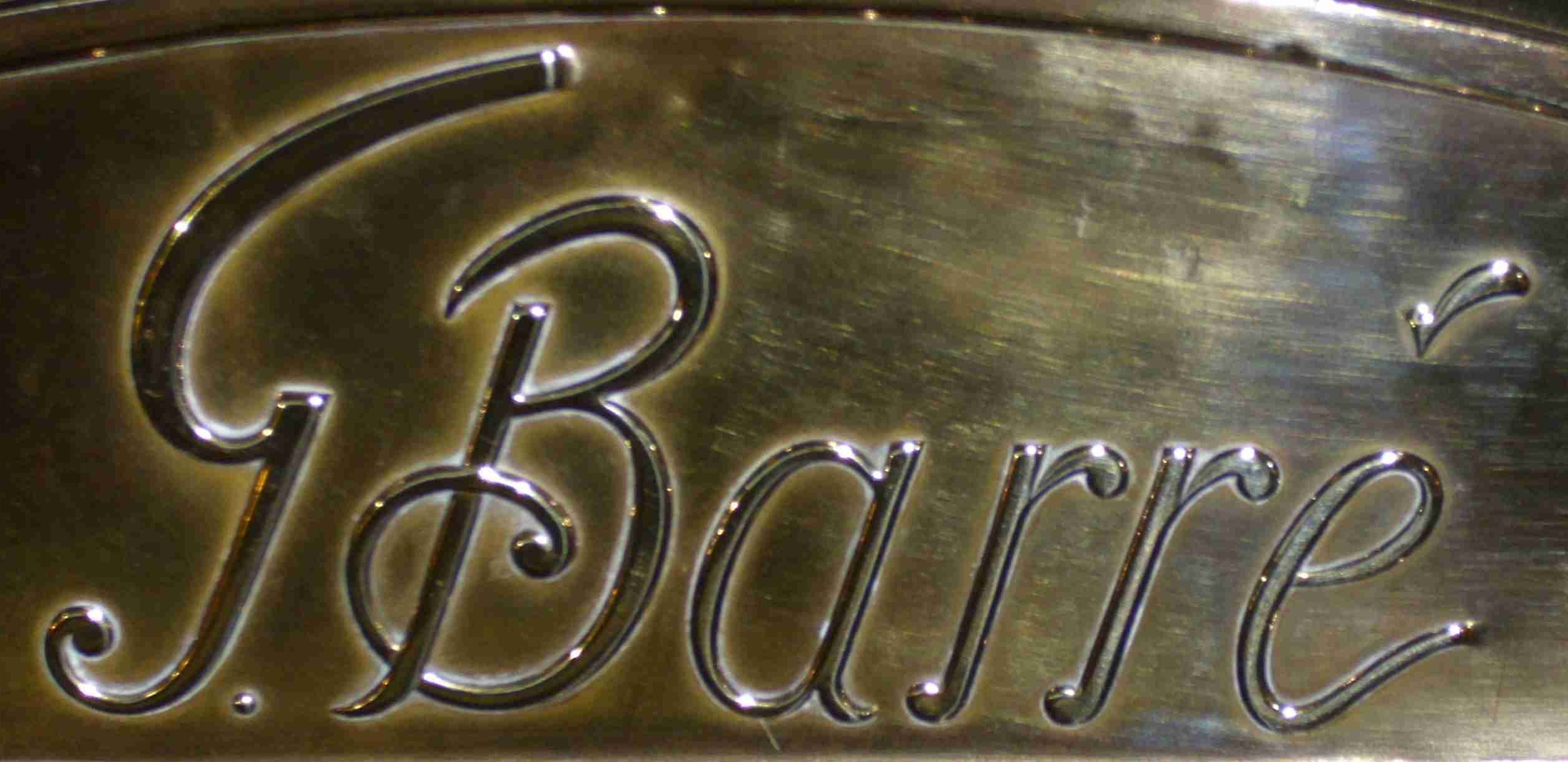

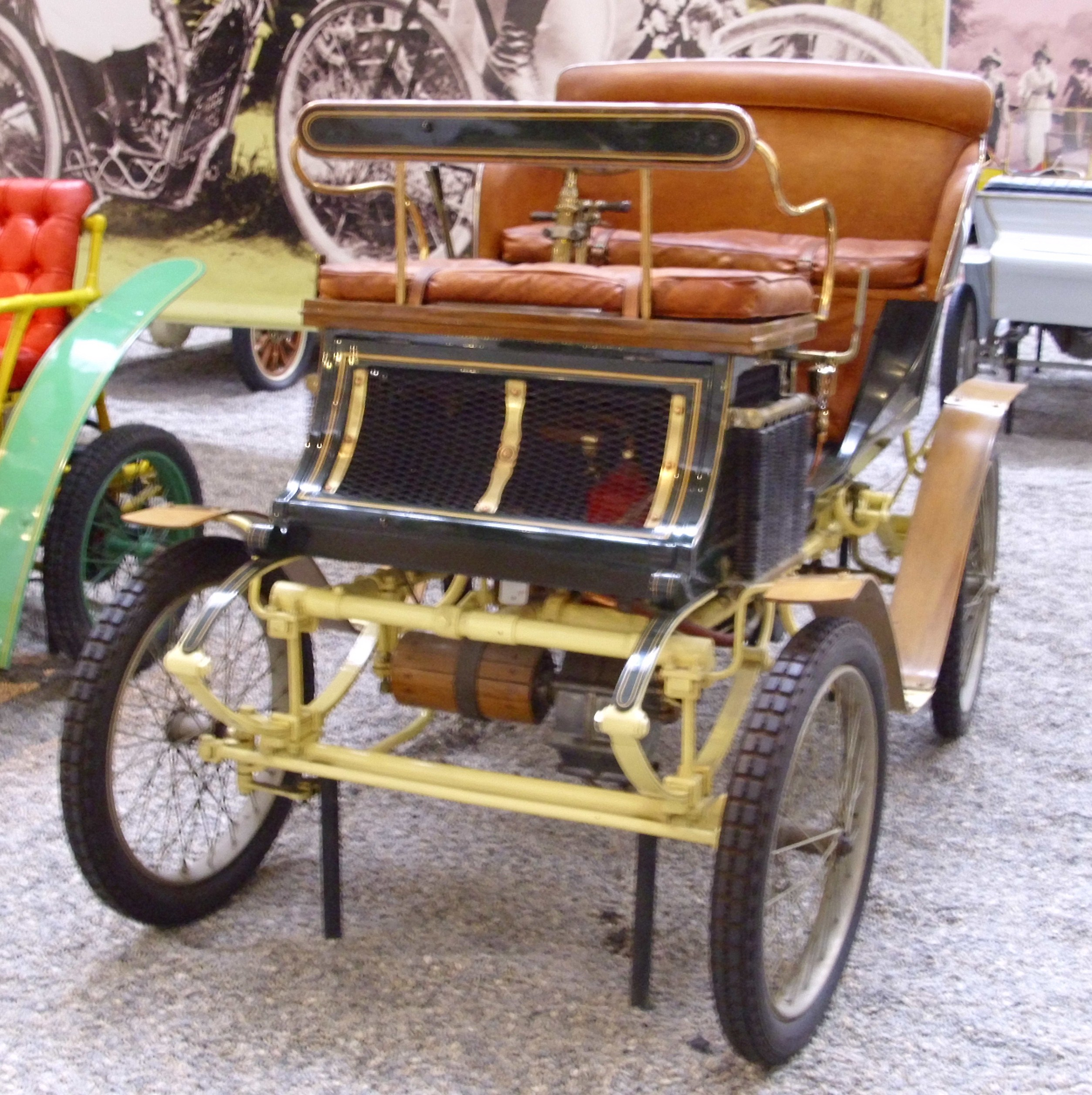
- Industry: Automotive
- Founded: 1899
- Founder: Gaston Barré (1864–1944)
- Defunct: 1930
- Successor: G. Barré et Cie (1908–1923); Barré et Lamberthon (1923–1927); SA des Automobiles Barré (1927–1930)
- Headquarters: Niort, France
- Products: cars

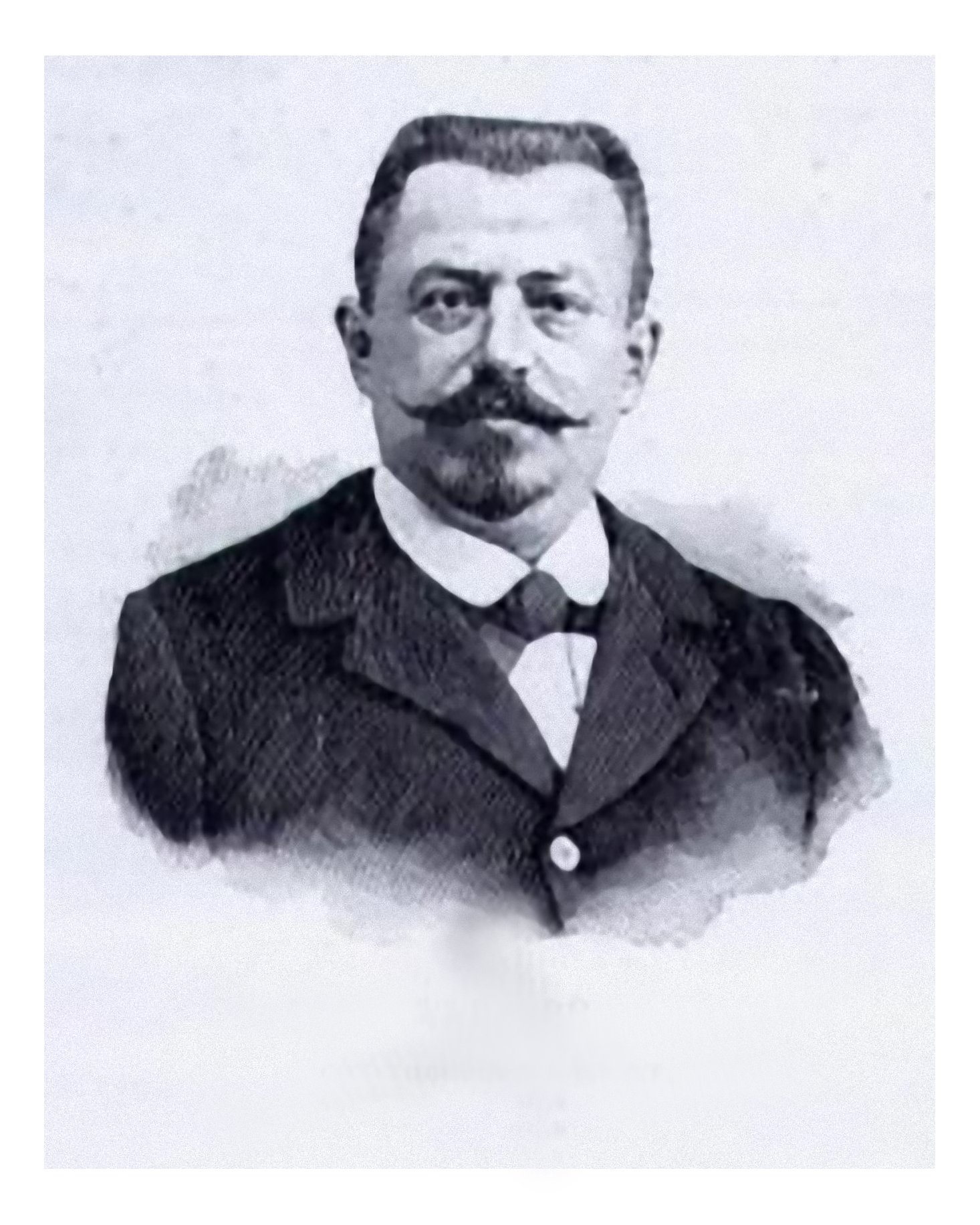
Gaston Barré in 1899

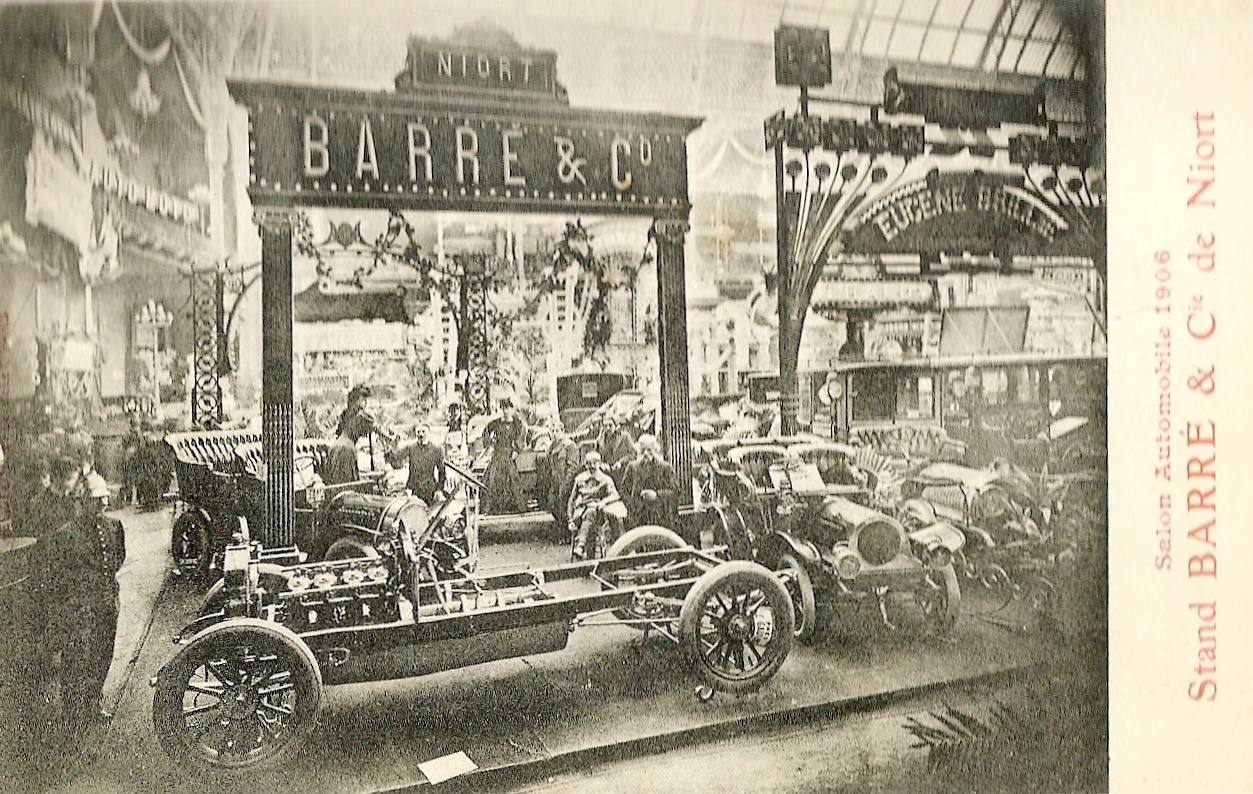
Salon de l'automobile de Paris 1906

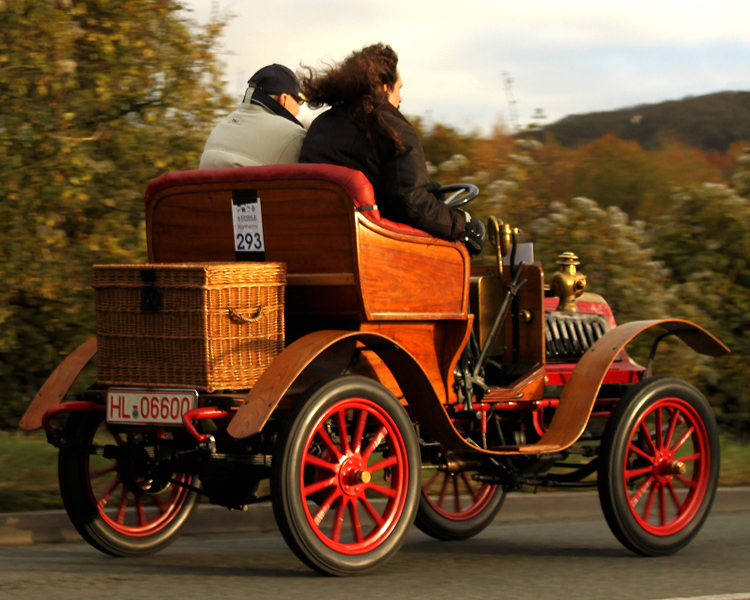
Barré 6HP Two-seater 1903

Barré was a French automobile manufacturer established by Gaston Barré at Niort. Some sources give the starting date for the business as 1900, although Barré's first automobile was presented in December 1899 at the Paris Motor Show. Production ended in 1930. The company was unusual for being located in western France, away from the main automotive centres of Paris and Lyon. During the First World War, the factory produced shells and military vehicles.

== Gaston Barré ==
Barré was born in Cholet on 25 June 1864, but in 1888 relocated to nearby Parthenay, where he worked as a gunsmith. Six years later he moved again, establishing himself in 1894 at Niort in the rue Ricard Il, as a manufacturer and renter of cycles. France was in the middle of a massive cycling boom, and business was good. Barré relocated his business several times, but now always staying in Niort. As he amassed his fortune he decided that the future lay not with cycles but with the automobile.

== Automobile production ==
The first car, powered by a Gaillardet engine, was exhibited in December 1899.

Several aspects of Barré's business distinguish it from the large number of automobile manufacturers being established in France at this time. He created one of the first after-sales service centres, and also integrated into his business model a driving school. Another respect in which Barré anticipated the future of automobile manufacturing was the extent to which his cars were developed as an assemblage of components manufactured by and purchased from specialist outside suppliers. During the first decade of the twentieth century the manufacturer used engines from Aster, Buchet and De Dion-Bouton. Rather than tooling up to machine and assemble his own axles and gears, Barré also bought in these principal components from companies already equipped to produce them. There were even instances when he bought in a chassis from a competitor auto-maker.

At the World Fair held in Paris in 1900 a Barré voiturette won a gold medal. Business grew, and by 1908 the enterprise had approximately 50 employees, and was registered using the company name G. Barré et Cie. In 1912 Barré cars won three of the top places in the French Tour de France Automobile, which covered 13 stages over 4,000 kilometres.

== Location ==
Throughout the first half of the twentieth century the French auto-industry was remarkably concentrated around Paris, with a secondary hub around Lyon. The celebrated exception is Peugeot. Barré, too, were exceptional in locating their production in a small town in the west of France, and the pattern of sales was also concentrated on the rural western part of the country. Nevertheless, on the eve of the First World War, which broke out in 1914, the manufacturer was offering a full range of automobiles. Long after the company ceased to exist, it continues to be commemorated in the name of the local technical school the lycée Gaston Barré (Le lycée des Métiers de l’Automobile et de la Logistique de Niort).

== The First World War and its aftermath ==
During the First World War Gaston Barré temporarily relocated his company's legal headquarters to the Paris showroom premises which he had acquired just before the outbreak of war. The factory in Niort was turned over to the production of shells and military vehicles.

Early post-war cars used engines supplied by Ballot and by S.C.A.P., both of them based in the Paris area.

In October 1919 Barré again took a stand at the Paris Motor Show. The two cars offered were a 10 HP/CV “Barré Type BA” with a 1,590 cc engine and a 12 HP/CV “Barré Type AB2” with a 2,292 cc unit. The first of these was a 2-seater ”Torpedo” bodied car, and sat on a 2,600 mm (102.4 in) wheelbase. The manufacturer published a list price of 13,000 francs for the 2-seater. The second, larger car sat on a 2,940 mm (115.7 in) wheelbase and was a 4-seater. This was offered either with a ”Torpedo” body or a “conduite intérieure” (saloon/sedan/berline) body, the cars priced respectively at 16,000 francs or 18,000 francs. Both the cars exhibited for 1920 looked as though they had been manufactured before the war.

== The 1920s ==
In the western region surrounding Niort the cars retained a loyal following, and by October 1924 the range on the manufacturer's stand at the 19th Paris Motor Show Barré comprised three models. They all featured four-cylinder engines, as follows:

- “Barré Type B4” 8/10 HP 1,685 cc, 2,950 mm (116.1 in) wheelbase
- “Barré Type AS” 10/12 HP 2,356 cc, 3,090 mm (121.7 in) wheelbase
- “Barré Type CS” 12/16 HP 2,803 cc, 3,090 mm (121.7 in) wheelbase

”Torpedo” bodied versions were priced, respectively, at 23,000 francs, 25,000 francs and 26,500 francs.

However, post-war production never again regained the momentum experienced earlier, and a period of slow decline continued till production ended in 1930 or 1933 (sources differ).
