= Simplicia (automobile) =

The Simplicia was a French automobile manufactured only in 1910. A 10/12 hp light car, it had independent front suspension; the backbone chassis was in unit with its Aster engine and gearbox.
