= Forecar =

Automobile or motorcycle with passenger seat placed in front of the engine

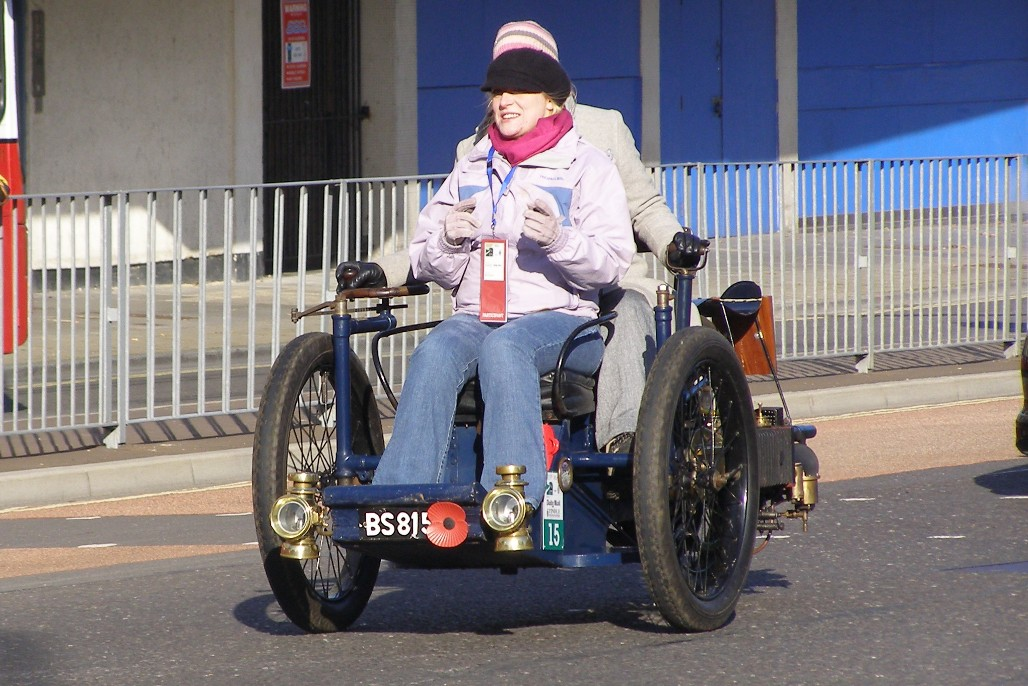
1898 Leon Bollée

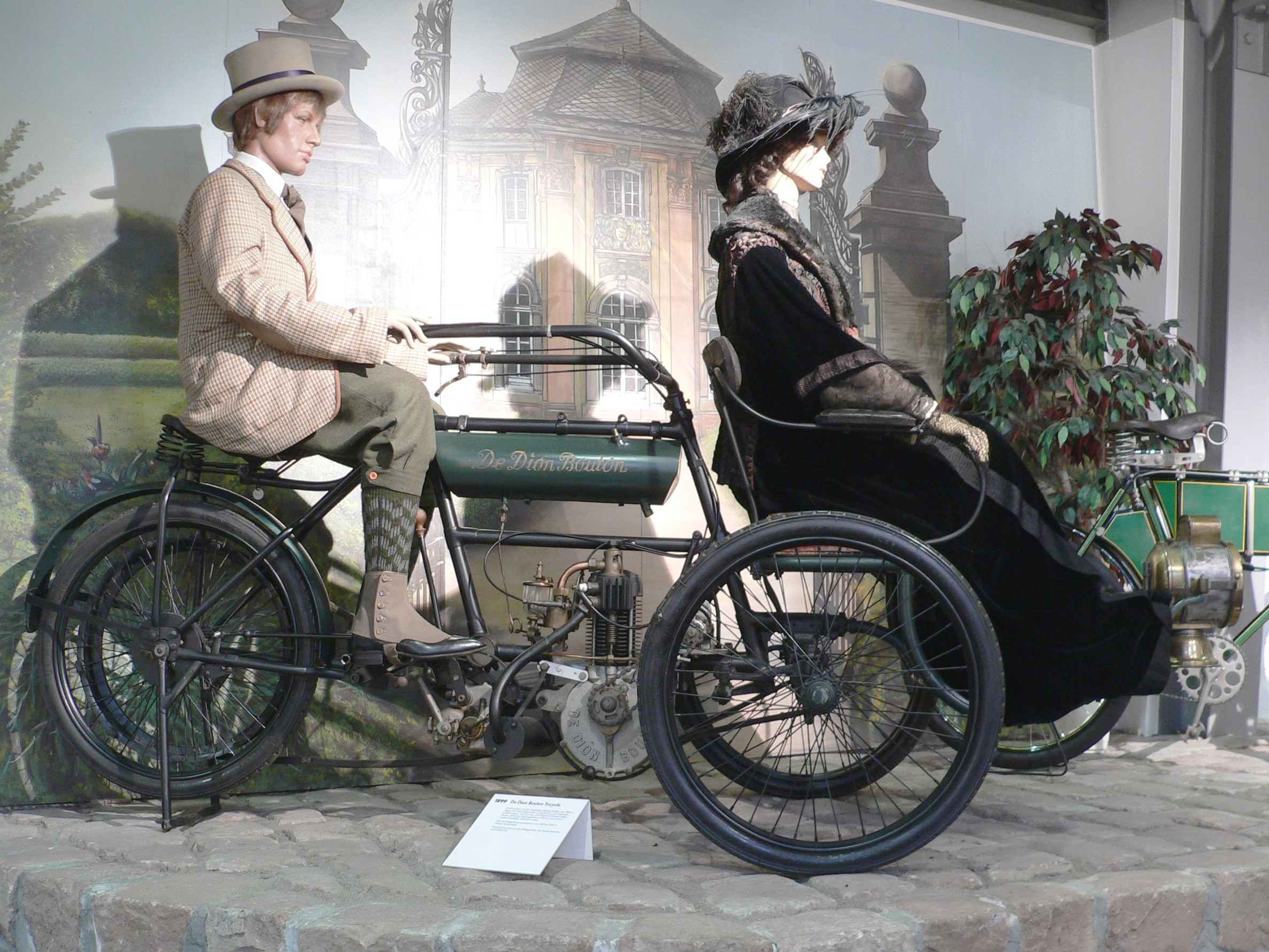
1899 De Dion-Bouton

A forecar is a body style of small, sometimes three-wheeler vehicles that were produced in the late 19th and early 20th centuries. Forecars were produced with three or four wheels and by companies which produced light cars or motorcycles.

In this type of body, the passenger seat was placed in front of the engine. It was usually placed above the front axle, leaving the occupant extremely vulnerable in the case of a collision. The driver's seat was behind and usually higher than that for the passengers. Weather protection was rarely provided.

On some models the front seat could be replaced by a rack to carry goods, thus converting the car to a light delivery vehicle.

== See also ==
- Sidecar
- Cycle rickshaw
