= Bentley Wildfowl and Motor Museum =

Visitor attraction at Halland, East Sussex, England

Coordinates: 50°55′26.5″N 0°6′42.6″E

- Location within East Sussex
- Location: Halland
- OS grid reference: TQ4858715914

History
- Built: 18th century; East wing 1960/1; West wing 1969/71

Site notes
- Area: East Sussex
- Architect: Extension: Raymond Erith
- Architectural style: Extension: Palladian

Listed Building – Grade II
- Official name: Bentley Farm, with attached walls and gate piers.
- Designated: 26 November 1963
- Reference no.: 1192009

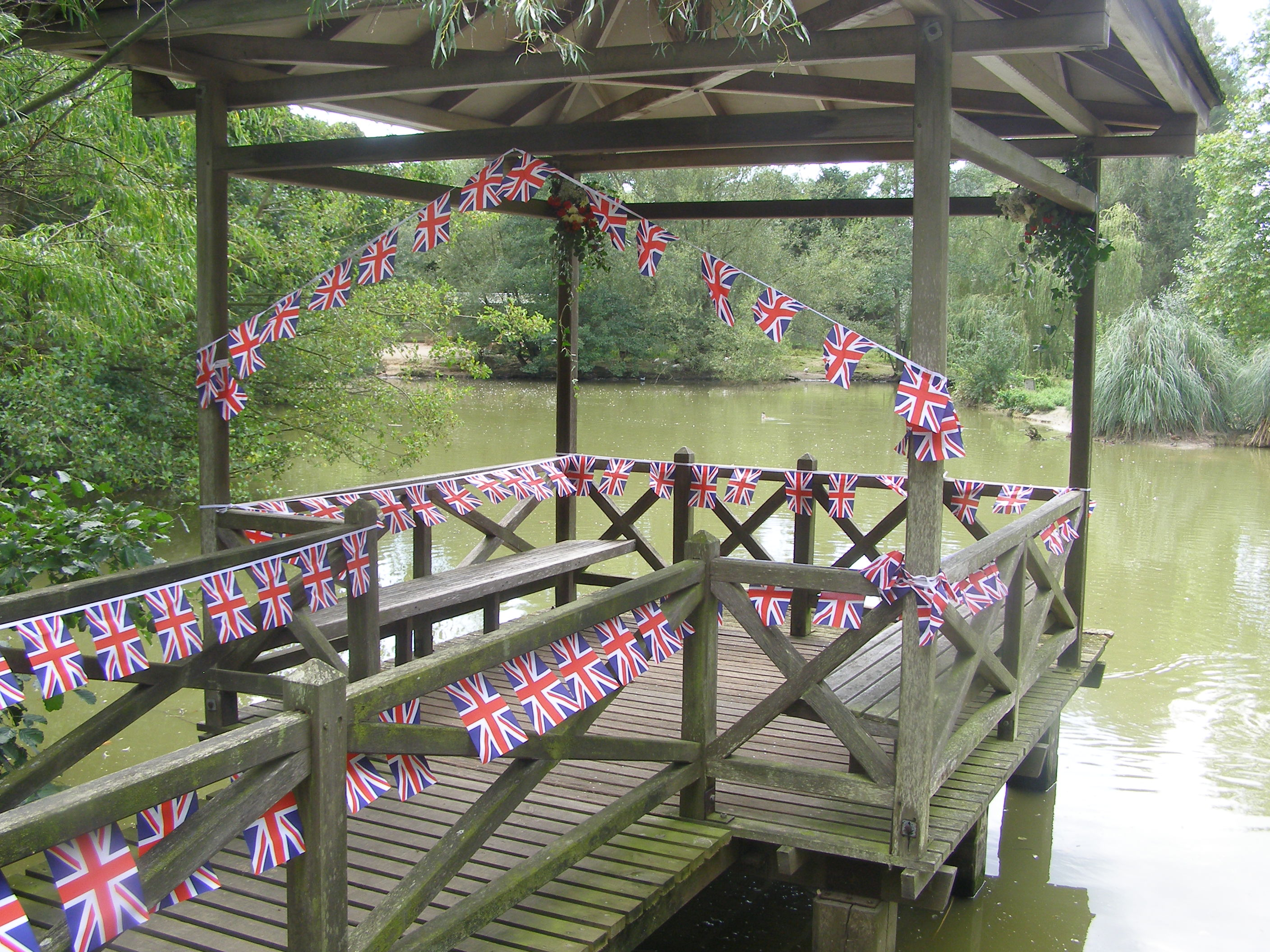

The Bentley Wildfowl and Motor Museum was a visitor attraction near Halland, East Sussex, England. As of October 2018, it is closed to the public.

== History ==
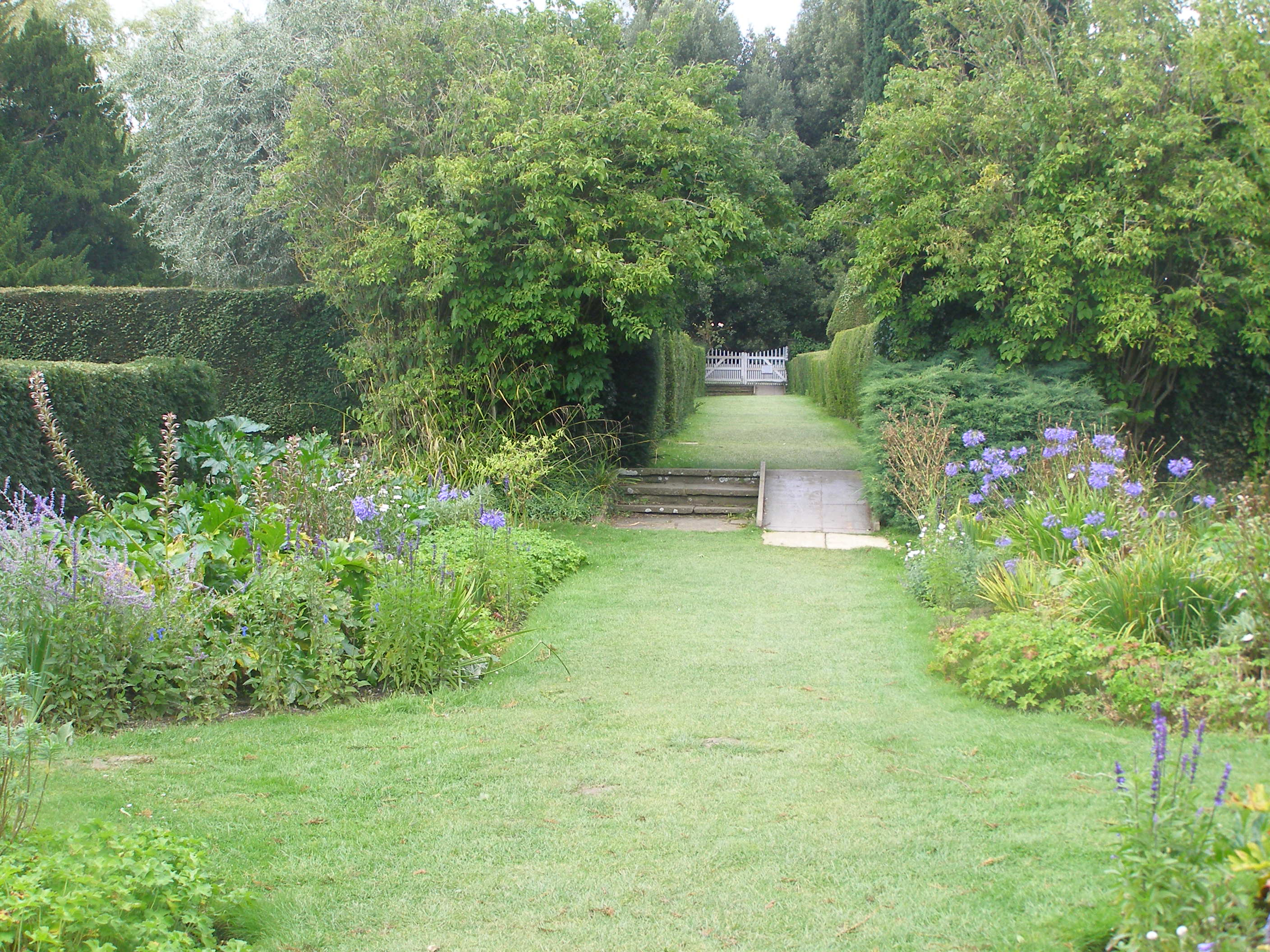
Part of the formal garden

The house at Bentley was bought by Gerald and Mary Askew in 1937 and following the Second World War the couple developed the house and garden and started a wildfowl collection. Two large Palladian rooms were added to each end of the original house. Following the death of Gerald Askew in 1970, Mary gave the nucleus of the estate to the people of East Sussex. Mary continues to live in part of the house and the site was developed as a tourist attraction.

In 2004, due to increasing running costs, the East Sussex Council offered to sell the property back to the Askew family for £1.25 million or it would sell the property on the open market. The Askews purchased the estate and placed it in the hands of a trust.

== Wildfowl ==
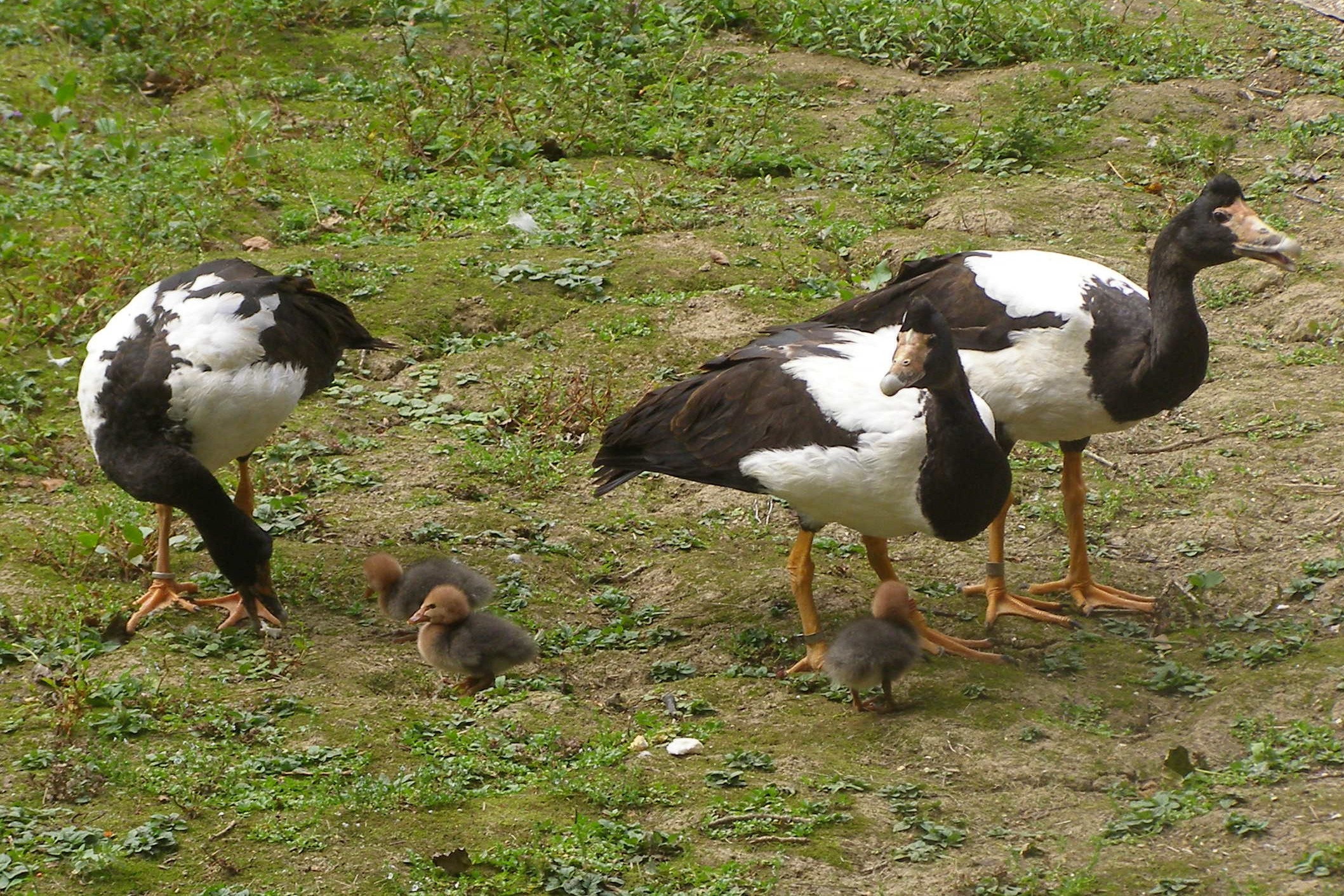
Magpie geese

In 1962, influenced by the Sussex artist Philip Rickman and a visit to the Wildfowl Trust at Slimbridge, the Askew's started a collection of wildfowl. A pond was dug in a nearby field which was poor agricultural land, and the collection was started. The collection held examples of 125 of the 147 species of wildfowl.

== Motor museum ==
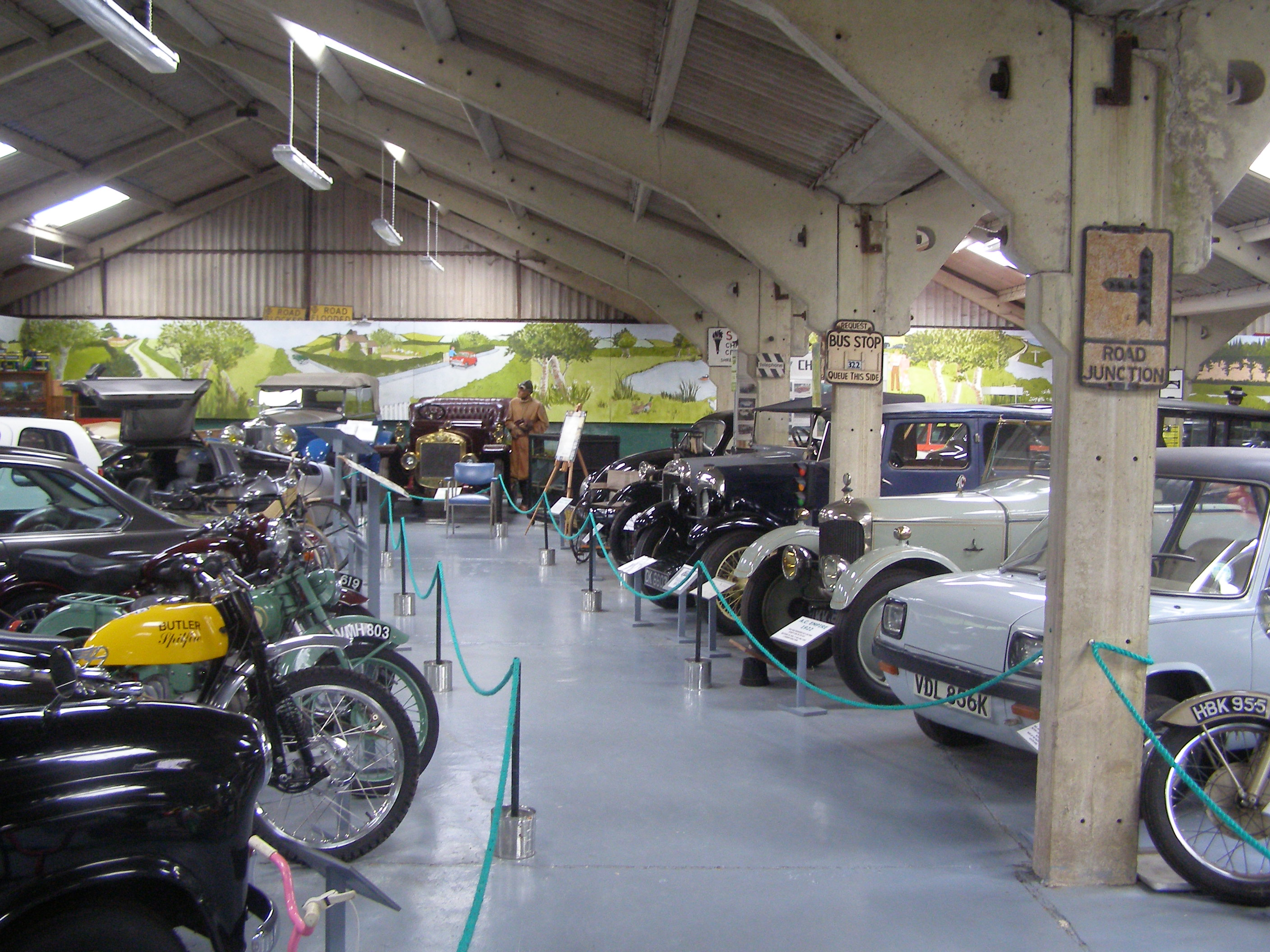
Motor museum

In 1982, a motor museum was opened on the site. Set up by Hugh Stuart-Roberts, it was a collection of vehicles, mostly owned by private individuals, on loan to the museum. The first car to be displayed was a 1928 Minerva.
