= Mutel (engineering) =

Automobile manufacturer

Mutel, Mutel & Cie was a French manufacturer of automobiles and engines, based in Paris, from 1902 until 1906.

== Company history ==
The Parisian company produced both engines and complete automobiles from 1902 until 1906. Engines were also supplied to other automobile manufacturers.

== Vehicles ==
Vehicles were built on a Malicet et Blin (M.A.B.) chassis, equipped with an in-house engine. One model had a 30 hp four-cylinder engine. In 1902 they offered two, three and four-seat models.

== Engine deliveries ==
Engines were supplied to: Otto Beckmann, BLM (Breese, Lawrence, Moulton), Boissaye, Celtic (Thornton Engineering), Century Engineering, Couverchel, C.V.R., Dorey, Elswick, L & B, Lacoste & Battmann, Meteor, Morgan, Prunel, Regal, Sage and Wasp.
