= Gordon Newey =

Former English automobile manufacturer

Newey, Newey-Aster, Gordon Newey, Gordon Newey Ltd, G.N.L. (GNL), (1907-1920) was a British automobile manufacturer from Birmingham.

== History ==
The company began in 1907 as a sales agency for De Dion-Bouton, Star Motor Company and Siddeley Autocar Company (John Siddeley, 1st Baron Kenilworth).

In 1907 they also manufactured cars using Aster engines from the French manufacturer, Ateliers de Construction Mecanique l'Aster. These were marketed as Newey-Asters.

In 1913 the company manufactured its own design which was branded and marketed as Newey.

From 1916 to 1919 vehicles were marketed as G.N.L. (GNL).

In 1921 production ended and the last cars were sold in 1923.

== Cars ==
=== Newey-Aster ===
Newey manufactured three models of motorcar with Aster engines: 10/12 HP, 20/22 HP and 24/30 HP, plus trucks which could carry a 500 kg payload.

=== Newey ===
In 1913 the 10 HP Newey appeared, a lightweight touring car with a 1,300cc inline four-cylinder side-valve engine and a wheelbase of 2,743 mm.

In 1915 the Newey 10/18 HP used a smaller body (wheelbase 2,591 mm) fitted with a larger 1.5 litre engine.

1918 replaced this the Newey 10/12 HP, also with a 1.5-liter engine, but with the longer wheelbase of 10 HP. This car was built until the cessation of production in 1921. [3]

In 1919 a new 1.8-litre four-cylinder 11/15 HP model topped the range. It was available for three years.

In 1920 the final model was introduced, the Newey 11.9 HP with a 1.6 litre, four-cylinder side-valve engine. Its wheelbase was 2591 mm.

After World War I the Newey 12/15 HP was introduced with a 1,750cc Chapuis-Dornier engine.

Although most models were available after the First World War, the production numbers were low .

=== G.N.L. ===
Between 1916 and 1919 obtaining engines from France was difficult, so Gordon Newey imported 2.4 litre four-cylinder engines from the United States, possibly from Continental Motors Company, for the two-seater and four-seater vehicles.

== Models ==
Brand	Model	Construction period	Cylinder	Capacity	Wheelbase	Text	Source
Newey-Aster	10/12 HP	1907–1907				Aster engine	
Newey-Aster	20/22 HP	1907–1907				Aster engine	
Newey-Aster	24/30 HP	1907–1907				Aster engine	
Newey	10 HP	1913–1916	4 cylinder	1327 cm^{3}	2743 mm	Aster engine	
Newey	10/18 HP	1915–1919	4 cylinder	1526 cm^{3}	2591 mm		
G.N.L.		1916–1919	4 cylinder	2400 cm^{3}		Motor aus den USA	
Newey	10/12 HP	1918–1921	4 cylinder	1505 cm^{3}	2743 mm		
Newey	11/15 HP	1919–1921	4 cylinder	1795 cm^{3}	2743 mm		
Newey	12/15 HP	etwa 1919–1921	4 cylinder	1750 cm^{3}		Motor von Chapuis-Dornier	
Newey	11.9 HP	1920–1921	4 cylinder	1557 cm^{3}	2591 mm		

== See also ==
- List of car manufacturers of the United Kingdom

== Other sources ==
- Harald Linz, Halwart Schrader: Die Internationale Automobil-Enzyklopädie. United Soft Media Verlag, München 2008, ISBN 978-3-8032-9876-8.
- George Nick Georgano : The Beaulieu Encyclopedia of the Automobile. Volume 2: G–O. Fitzroy Dearborn Publishers, Chicago 2001, ISBN 1-57958-293-1. (English)
