= Cité de l'Automobile =

Coordinates: 47°45′39″N 7°19′43″E

Musée National de l'Automobile Collection Schlumpf
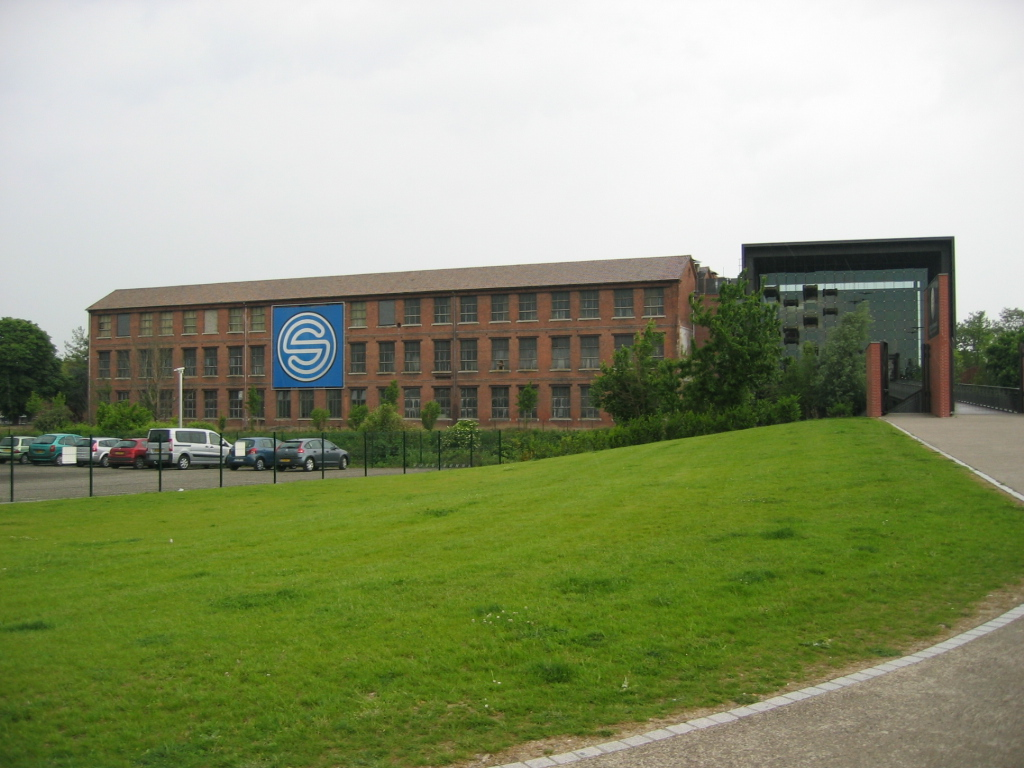
- Established: 1978; 48 years ago
- Location: Mulhouse, France
- Type: Automobile museum
- Collection size: 500 by 98 manufacturers
- Visitors: 200,000
- Director: Emmanuel Bacquet
- Public transit access: From SNCF Mulhouse take tramway number 1
- Website: https://www.musee-automobile.fr/en/

Musée National de l’Automobile, Collection Schlumpf is an automobile museum located in Mulhouse, France, and built around the Schlumpf Collection of classic automobiles. It has the largest displayed collection of automobiles and contains the largest and most comprehensive collection of Bugatti motor vehicles in the world.

== History ==
Brothers Hans and Fritz Schlumpf were Swiss citizens born in Italy, but after their mother Jeanne was widowed, she moved the family to her home town of Mulhouse in Alsace, France. The two brothers, who were later described as having a "Schlumpf obsession", were devoted to their mother.

In 1935, the brothers founded a limited company which focused on producing spun woollen products. By 1940, at the time of the German invasion of France, 34-year-old Fritz was the chairman of a spinning mill in Malmerspach. After World War II, the two brothers devoted their time to growing their business, and became wealthy.

=== Building the collection ===
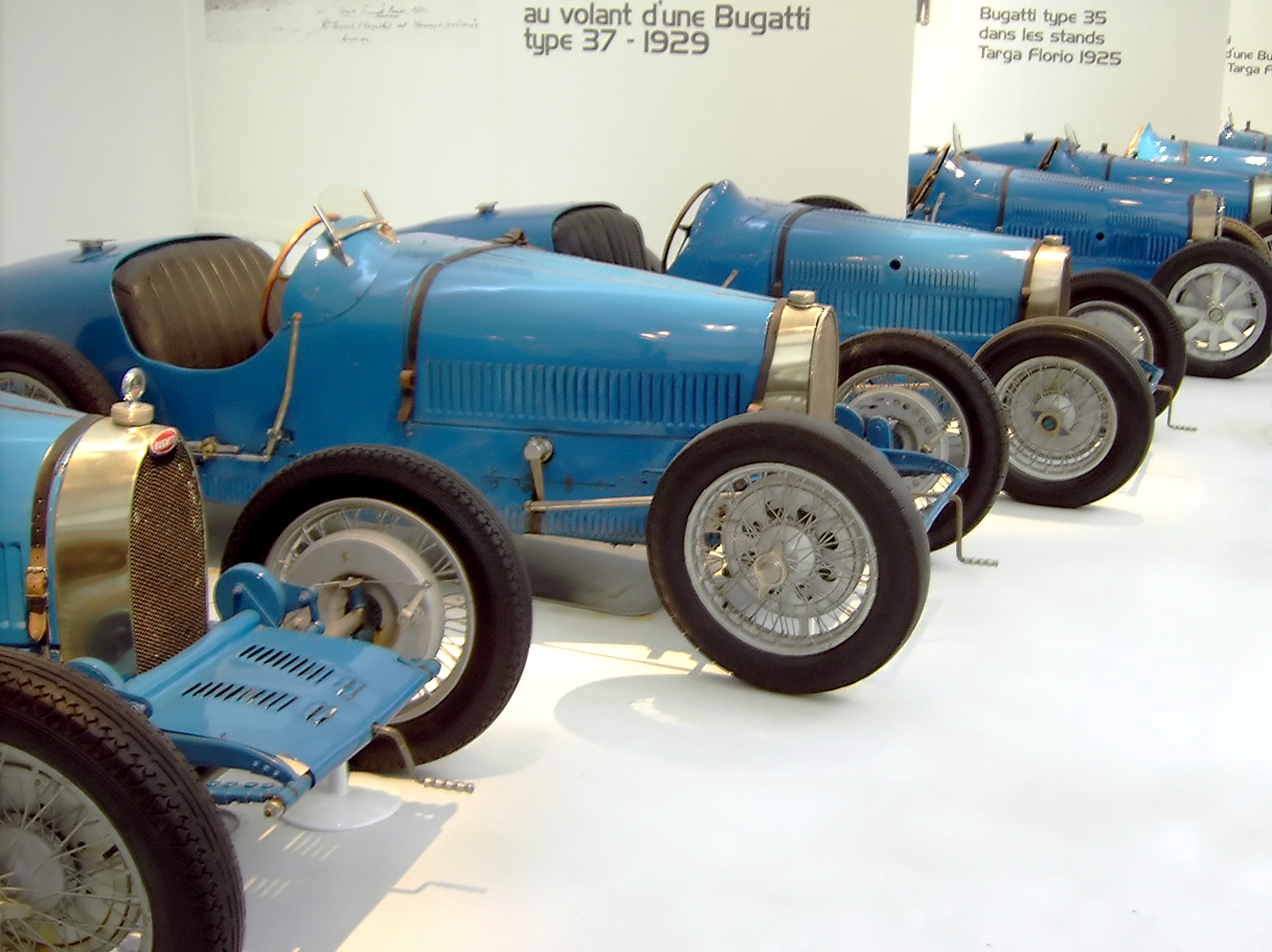
Bugatti Racing Cars in the museum

Fritz had a longstanding interest in automobiles and automotive engineering. He had wanted a Bugatti since childhood and purchased a Type 35B just before the German invasion of France.

After the war, he began racing classic cars, but was requested by the textile union to "abstain from this competition which could endanger your life and deprive us of our esteemed director." Schlumpf had been generous to his workers, providing employee trips, installing an employee theater and driving expectant mothers to the hospital in his own car. This was in great contrast to brother Hans, a former banker, who paid the mill workers poorly, docked fifteen minutes off their pay if they were late or signed out a minute or two early, and did not pay bonuses or increments.

With the arrival of modern postwar designs in the 1950s, prewar cars became affordably available. Fritz and Hans began collecting in earnest in the early 1950s, developing a reputation in the trade for only buying the most desirable models. Assisted by Mr Raffaelli, a Renault dealer from Marseille and the owner of several Bugattis, they built a Bugatti collection obsessively and quickly:

- During the summer of 1960, they acquired ten Bugattis, including two Type 57s and one Type 46 5-litre model. In addition the pair found three Rolls-Royces, two Hispano-Suizas and one Tatra. By the end of the summer, they had purchased 40 cars.
- Gordini sold them ten old racing cars in one sale
- Ferrari sold a racing single seater
- Mercedes-Benz sold spare cars from its collection
- Racing driver Jo Siffert sold three Lotus racing cars

Bugatti remained the brothers' focus. Fritz sent a form letter to all owners on the Bugatti club register, offering to buy all of their cars. In 1962, he bought nearly 50 Bugattis. In the spring of 1963, he acquired 18 of Ettore Bugatti's personal cars, including the Bugatti Royale Coupé Napoléon. In 1963, automobile collector John Shakespeare of Centralia, Illinois, an oil developer and heir to the Shakespeare fishing reel fortune, offered his 30 Bugattis, the largest collection in the United States. Fritz bought all of them, making headlines in the United States. By 1967, the brothers owned 105 examples of the marque.

=== Mulhouse ===
Over the years, nearly 400 items (vehicles, chassis and engines) were acquired, and from 1964, as the woollen industry started to downturn, a wing of the former 200,000 sq ft (19,000 m^{2}) Mulhouse spinning mill was chosen to quietly restore and house the collection.

A team of up to 40 carpenters, saddlers, and master mechanics was assembled under a confidentiality agreement to carry out the restoration work. While many around the world, including members of Bugatti clubs the globe over, knew of the collection, its scale still surprised the unfamiliar.

Fritz visited Mulhouse daily, choosing the colors and type of restoration each car would receive. The workers removed the mill's interior walls and laid a red tile walkway with gravel floors for the cars to rest upon. Seeking to avoid competing against themselves, the brothers remained very secretive about their collection, only rarely showing it to a favored few.

=== The Schlumpf affair ===
In light of the unrelenting global shift of textile manufacturing to Asia, by 1976, the Schlumpf brothers began selling their factories. In October, the Malmerspach plant laid off employees, and a strike broke out, with 400 police holding back the workers from ransacking the Mulhouse plant. After a stand-off, on March 7, 1977, textile-union activists staged a sit-in strike at Schlumpf offices, and broke into the Mulhouse "factory" to find the astounding collection of cars. An unrestored Austin 7 was burned and the workers' union representative remarked "There are 600 more where this one came from."

The Schlumpfs fled to their native Switzerland, and lived out their lives at the Drei Koenige Hotel in Basel. But with wages and tax evasion accusations outstanding, the factory was occupied the next two years by the textile-union and renamed "Workers’ Factory." To recoup some lost wages, the union opened the museum to the public, with some 800,000 people viewing the collection in two years.

As the scale of the brothers Schlumpf debt rose, various creditors, including the French government and unions, eyed the car collection toward recovering their losses. To save the collection from destruction, break-up or export, the contents were classified in 1978 as a French Historic Monument by Council of State. In 1979, a bankruptcy liquidator ordered the building closed.

=== National Automobile Museum Association ===
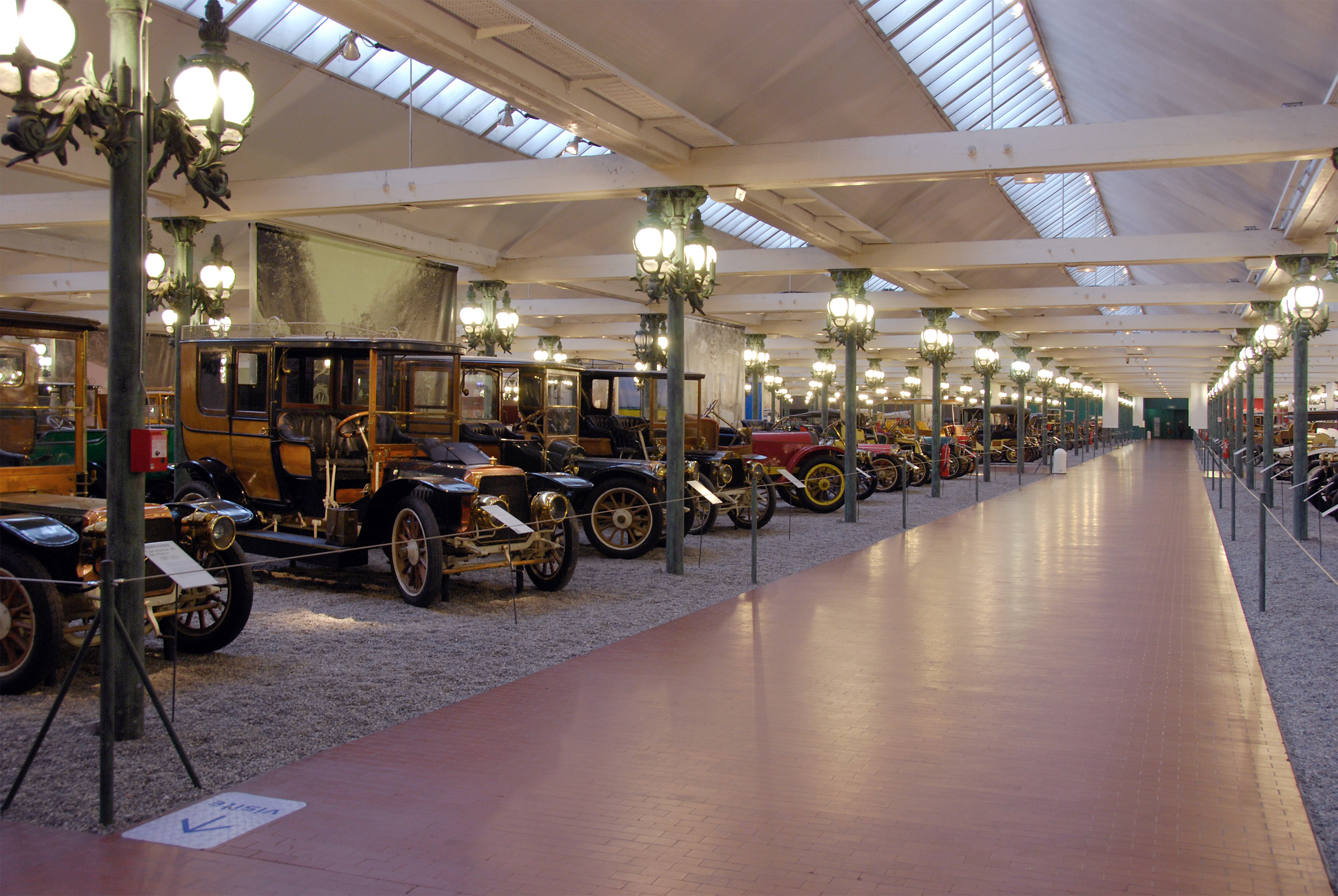
A view of the refurbished main-hall, with its Pont Alexandre III lamp posts

In 1981, the collection, buildings and residual land were sold to the National Automobile Museum Association (NAMAoM), a state sanctioned public/private conglomerate that includes: the City of Mulhouse, the Regional Board of the Alsace Region, the organizers of the Paris Auto Show and the Automobile Club de France.

The NAMAoM placed daily management of the museum in the hands of an operating company, the National Automobile Museum of Mulhouse Management Association, which opened the museum to the public in 1982. However, lacking the enthusiasm of the Schlumpfs or the financial drive of the union, the collection gradually fell into decline.

In 1999, NAMAoM contracted Culturespaces to take over and modernise the museum and its operations. Culturespaces renovated the museum, including creating large scale public spaces for other cultural events, while conserving the well-known main hall with its Pont Alexandre III lamp posts. Widening the relevance of the museum to a younger audience by being given control of the French national automobile collection, the museum reopened in March 2000 as the largest automobile museum in the world.

=== Malmerspach collection ===
In 1981, Fritz Schlumpf filed a lawsuit from Switzerland claiming he was entitled to a portion of the proceeds of the sale to NAMAoM. He died in 1992, but in 1999, a French court found in his favor, and directed that the French Government pay the balance of a 40 million franc indemnity to Schlumpf's widow Madame Arlette Schlumpf-Naas in Switzerland. The court also instructed return of the ownership of the 62 cars in the so-called "Malmerspach collection" (the reserve stock), including 17 Bugattis - 8 from the collection of John Shakespeare.

Having moved the cars to a shed in Wettolsheim, Madame Schlumpf-Naas drew up a sales agreement similar to a reverse mortgage with businessmen Jaap Braam Ruben and Bruno Vendiesse, selling them ownership of the cars but retaining them in her storage shed until after her death. Upon her death on 16 May 2008 at the age of 78, many of the cars were sold to Peter W. Mullin in the United States to be displayed at the Mullin Automotive Museum in Oxnard, California (formerly housing the Chandler Vintage Museum of Transportation and Wildlife).

== The museum today ==
The museum is now listed as a National Heritage site by the French Government. The museum is still dedicated to the Schlumpf brothers' mother Jeanne Schlumpf; there is a large shrine to her at the entrance to the museum.

The collection includes over 520 vehicles, with 400 displayed in three main sections in chronological order:

- The Motorcar Experience
- Motor Racing - including a grid of Type 35 Bugattis, plus Maserati 250Fs, Mercedes-Benz W125 and W154 pre-war Grand Prix cars and a hoard of light blue Gordinis
- Motorcar Masterpieces

The museum houses three Bugatti "Royale"s: two of the original six Royales plus a replica of the Esder Royale created at the Schlumpf brothers' workshops from original Bugatti spare parts.

Few of the cars on display are in running order, although the old Schlumpf restoration shop, abandoned in 1977, is being revived to begin working again on the museum's cars.

Visitors to the museum are given a free audioguide in their chosen language. The tour has been enhanced by new sections, films, driving simulators, robots and attractions such as sound programmes.

=== The collection ===
1 ABC (British), 8 Alfa Romeo, 4 Amilcar, 2 Arzens, 1 Aster, 1 Aston Martin, 1 Audi, 1 Austro-Daimler, 3 Ballot, 1 Bardon, 1 Barraco, 2 Barré, 1 Baudier, 4 Bentley, 8 Benz, 1 B.N.C, 1 Bollée, 1 Brasier, 123 Bugatti, 1 Charron, 1 Chrysler, 1 Cisitalia, 10 Citroën, 1 Clément de Dion, 2 Clément-Bayard, 1 Clément-Panhard, 1 Corre La Licorne, 6 Daimler, 4 Darracq, 1 Decauville, 1 De Dietrich, 29 De Dion-Bouton, 3 Delage, 4 Delahaye, 2 Delaunay-Belleville, 1 Dufaux, 1 Ensais, 1 Esculape, 2 Farman, 13 Ferrari, 4 Fiat, 3 Ford, 1 Fouillaron, 3 Georges Richard, 1 Gladiator, 11 Gordini, 7 Hispano-Suiza, 3 Horch, 2 Horlacher, 1 Hotchkiss et Cie, 2 Hotchkiss-Gregoire, 1 Jaquot (Dampfwagen), 3 Le Zèbre, 1 Lorraine-Dietrich, 4 Lotus, 1 M.A.F., 8 Maserati, 2 Mathis, 1 Maurer-Union, 7 Maybach, 1 McLaren-Peugeot, 1 Menier, 9 Mercedes, 22 Mercedes-Benz, 2 Minerva, 2 Monet-Goyon, 2 Mors, 1 Moto-Peugeot, 2 Neracar, 1 O.M., 19 Panhard & Levassor, 1 Pegaso, 29 Peugeot, 1 Philos, 1 Piccard-Pictet, 3 Piccolo, 2 Pilain, 6 Porsche, 1 Ravel, 18 Renault, 1 Rheda, 1 Richard-Brasier, 1 Ripert, 1 Rochet-Schneider, 14 Rolls-Royce, 1 Sage, 1 Salmson, 1 Scott, 1 Sénéchal, 5 Serpollet, 3 Simca-Gordini, 1 Sizaire-Naudin, 1 Soncin, 1 SS, 1 Steyr, 2 Talbot, 1 Tatra, 1 Toyota, 1 Trabant, 1 Turicum, 1 Vaillante, 7 Vélo, 1 Vélo-Goldschmitt, 1 Vélo-Peugeot, 1 Vermotel, 1 Violet-Bogey, 3 Voisin, 1 Volkswagen, 2 Zedel

== Gallery ==
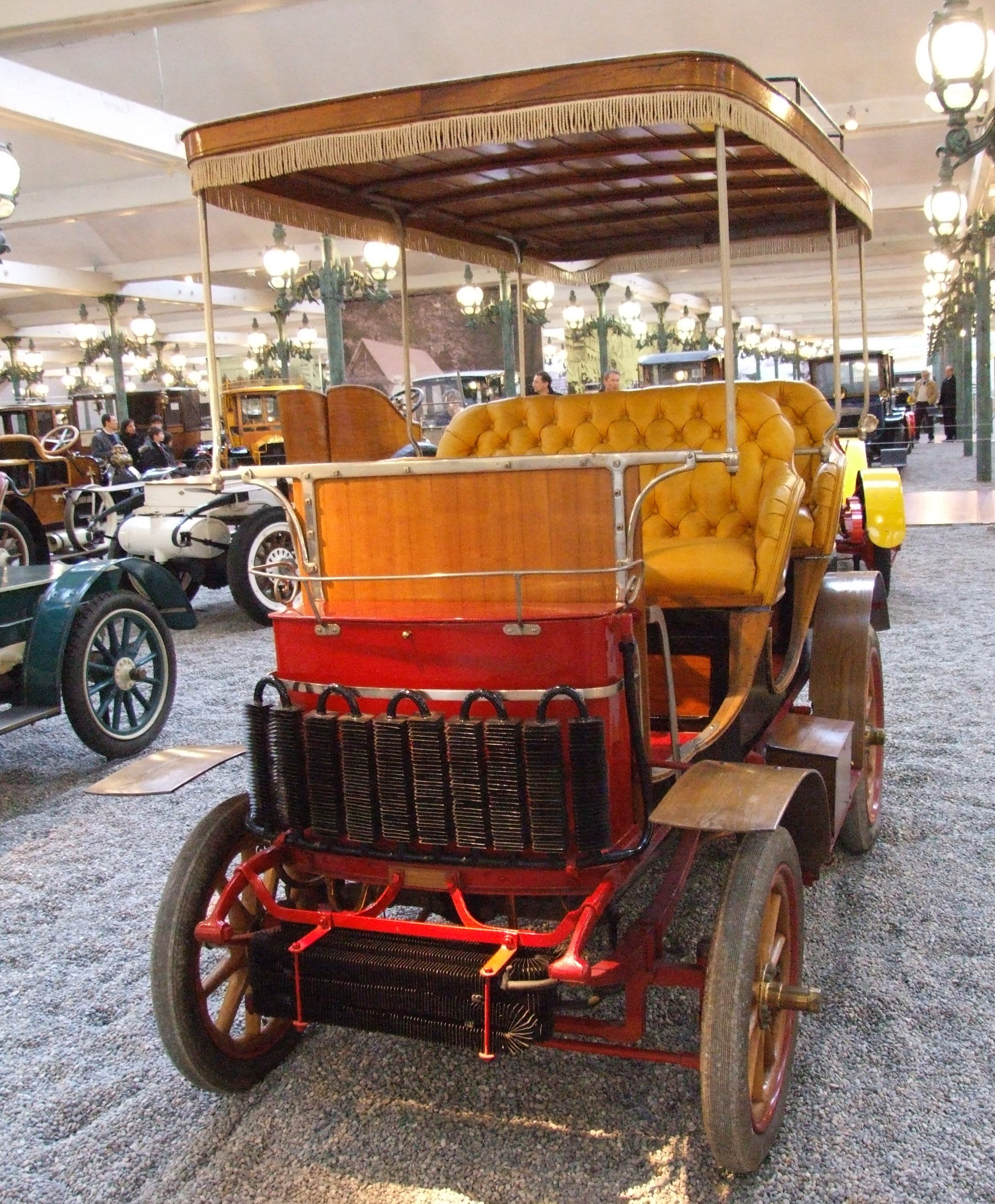
Serpollet Double Phaeton Type A 1902

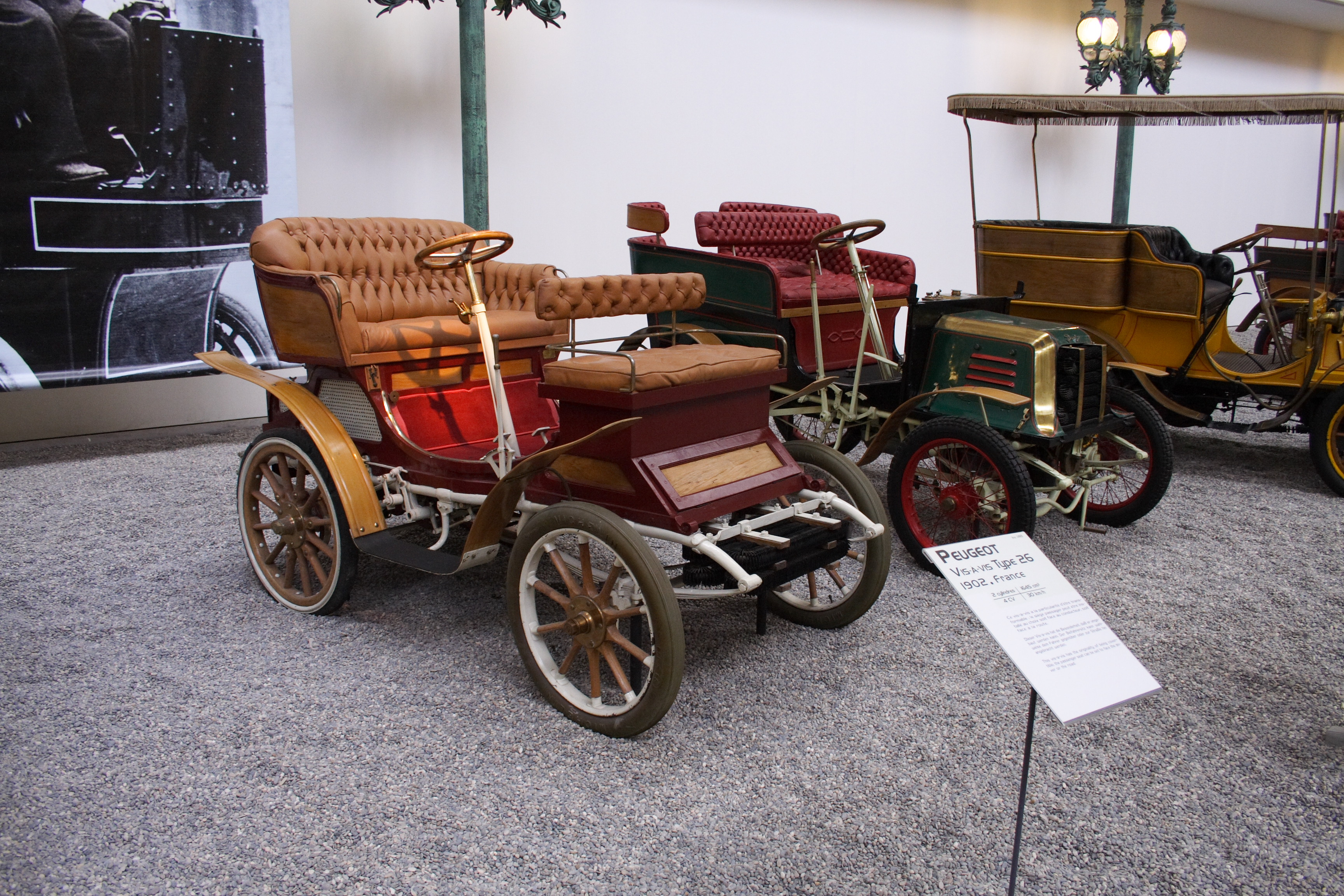
Peugeot VIS-A-VIS Type 26 1902

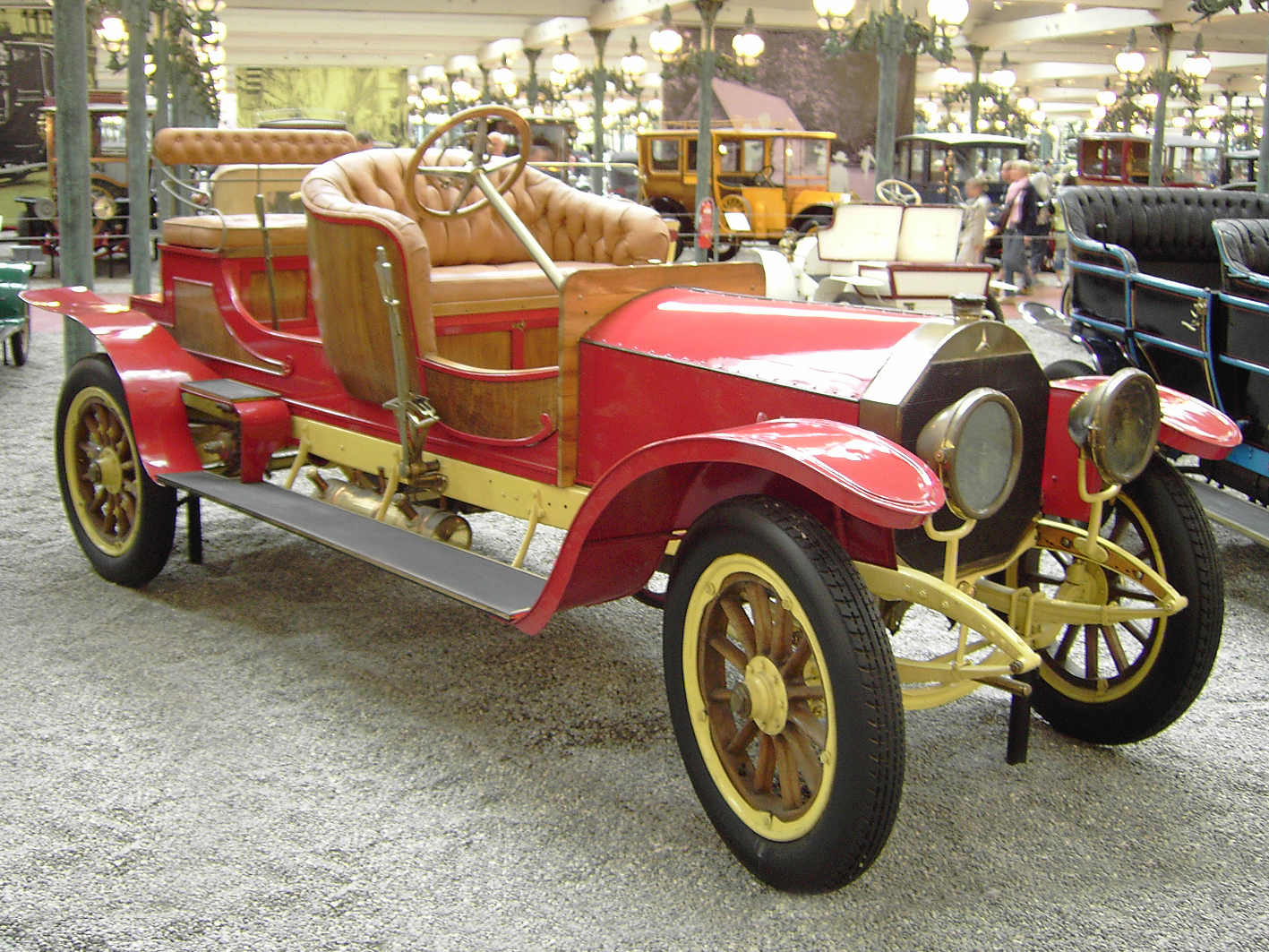
Mercedes Double Phaeton

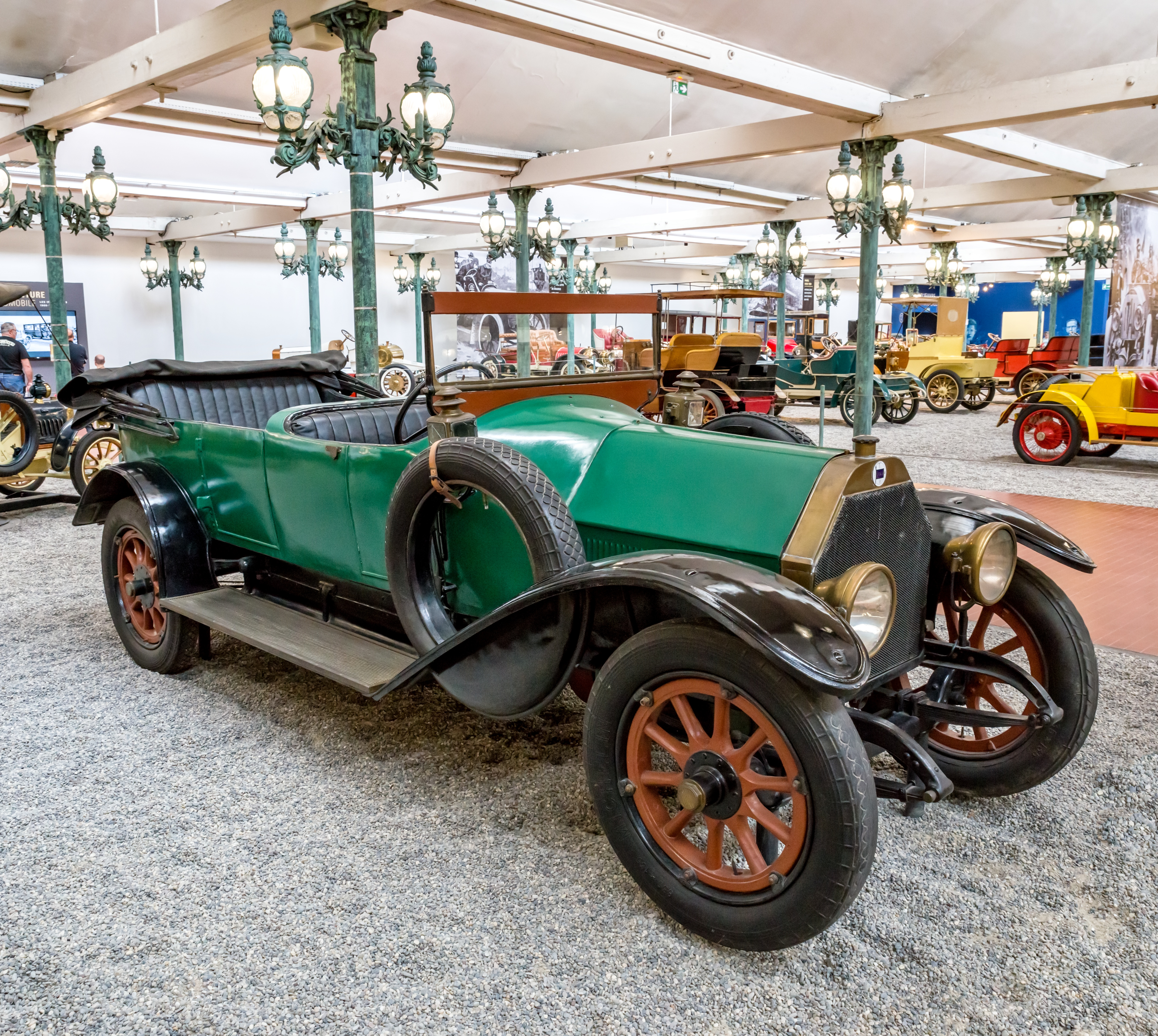
Lancia Torpedo Type Epsilon 1912

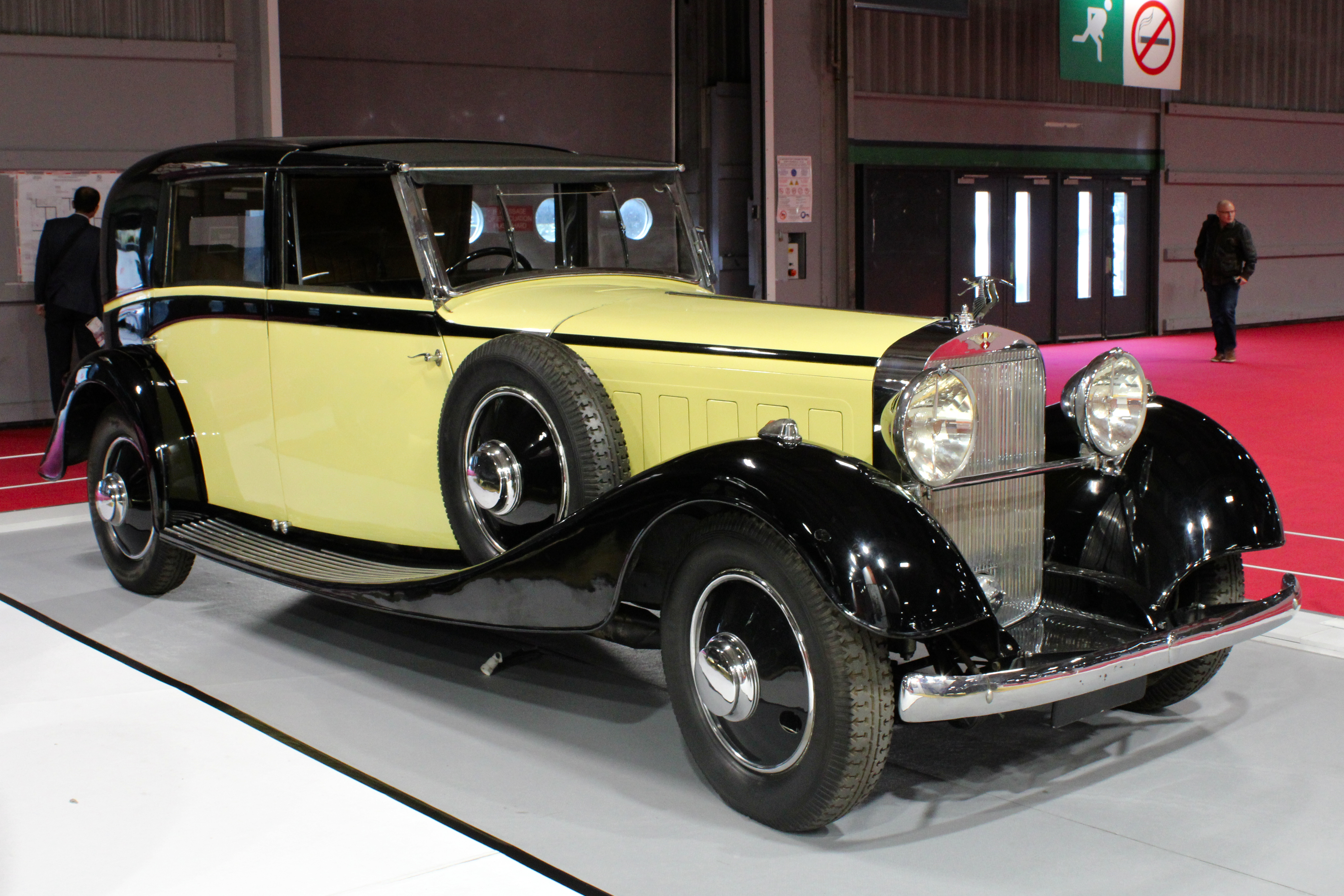
Hispano-Suiza Coupé Chauffeur J12 1934

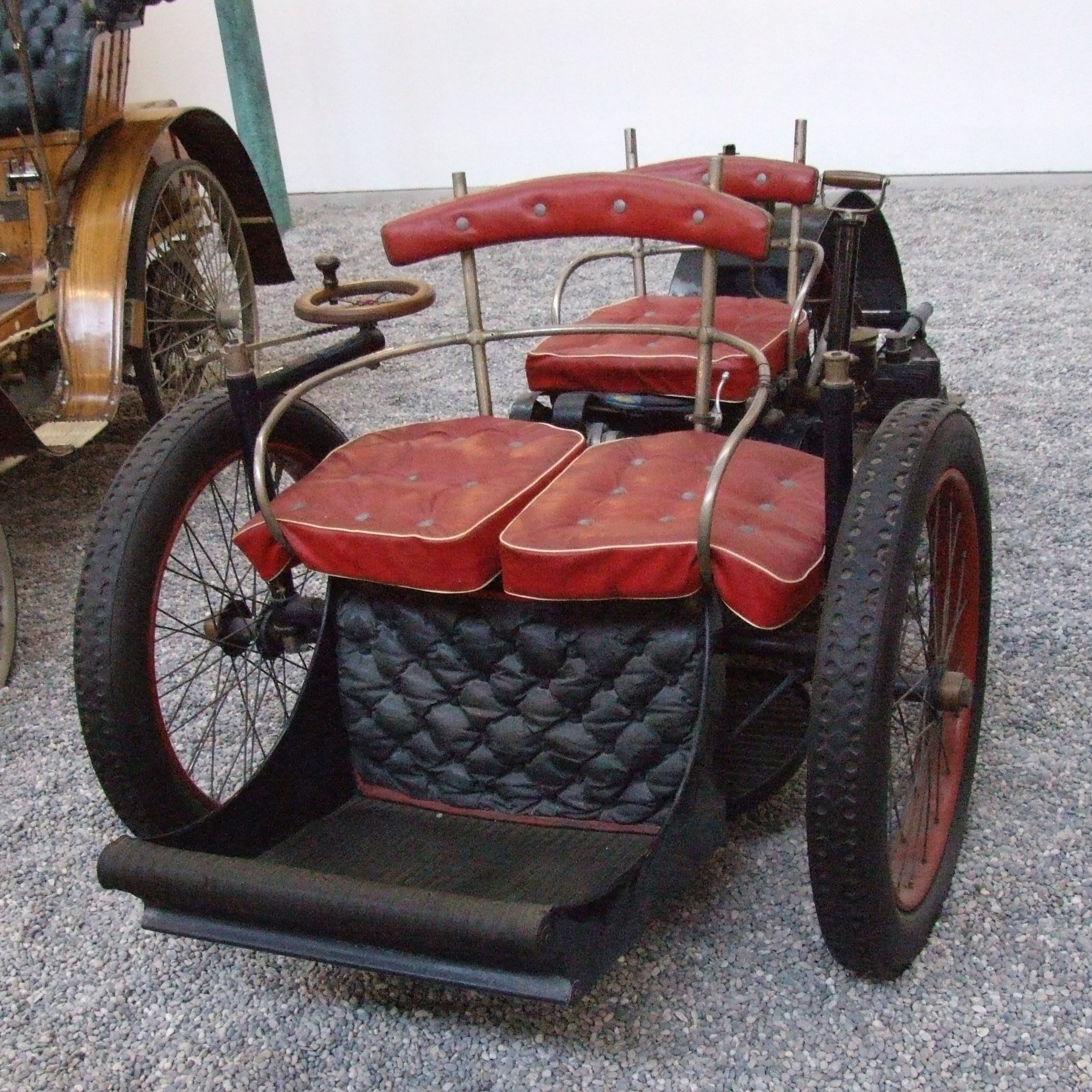
Léon Bollée Tricar, 1896

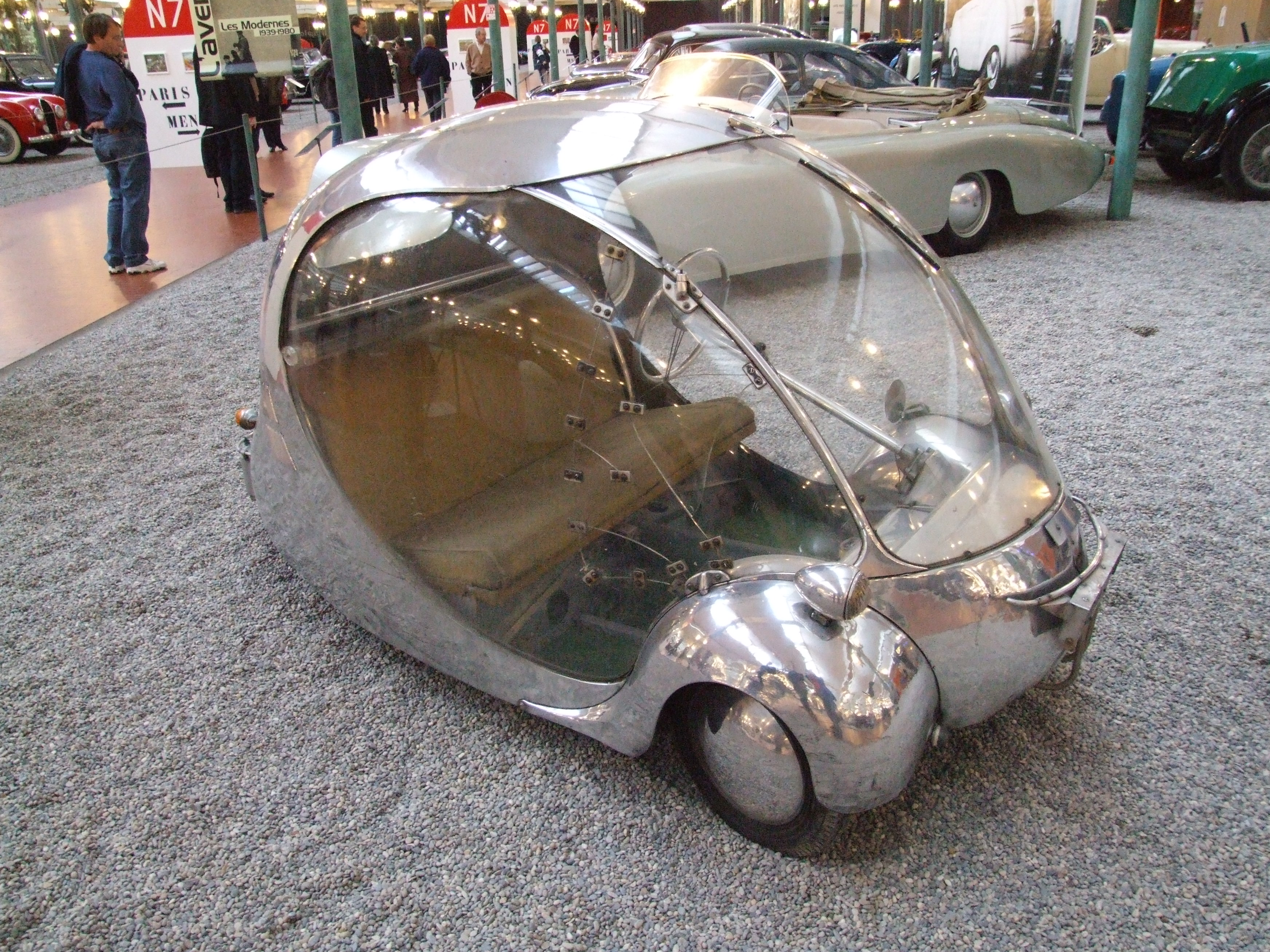
Arzens' Œuf (egg), 1948

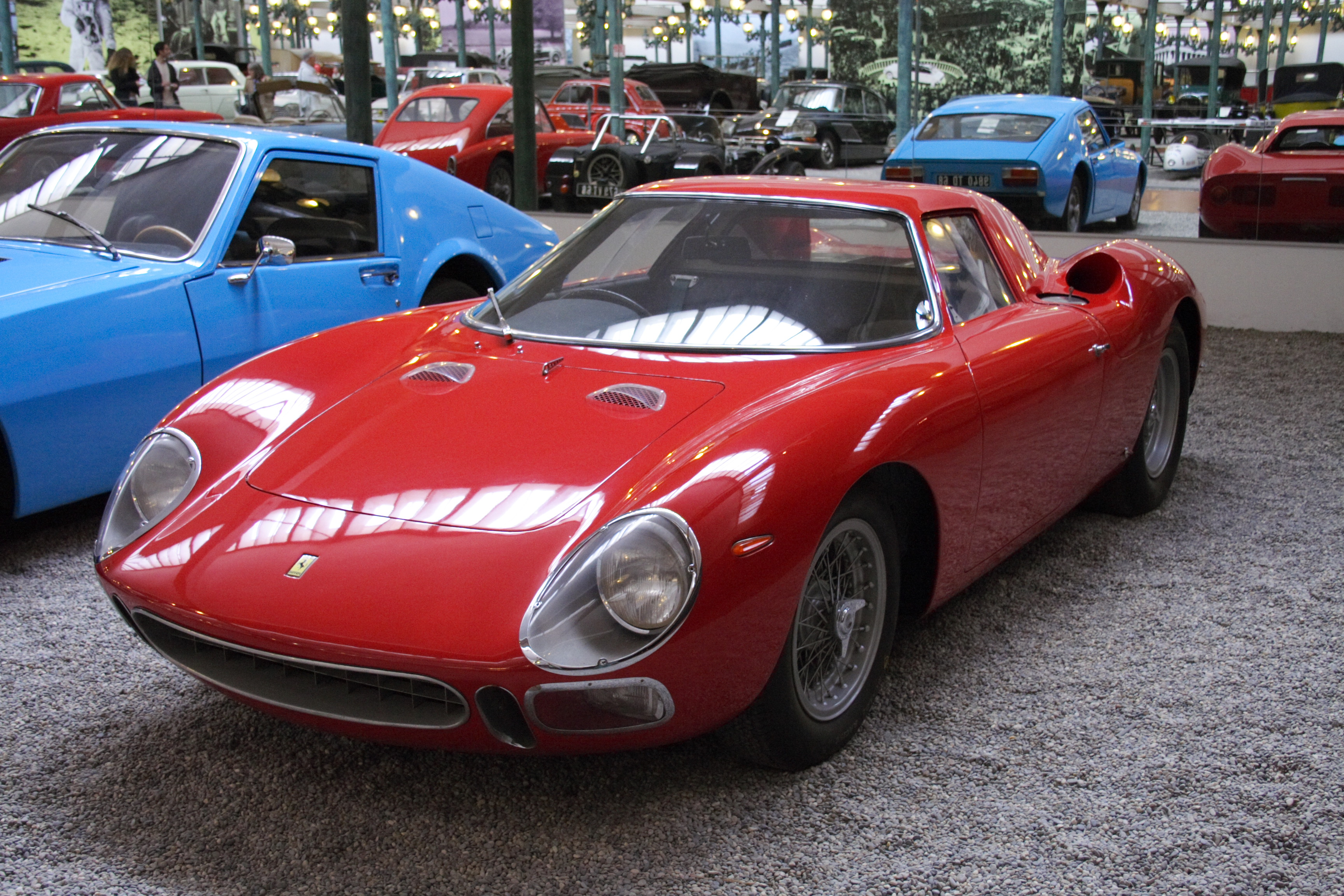
Ferrari Coupe 250 LM 1964

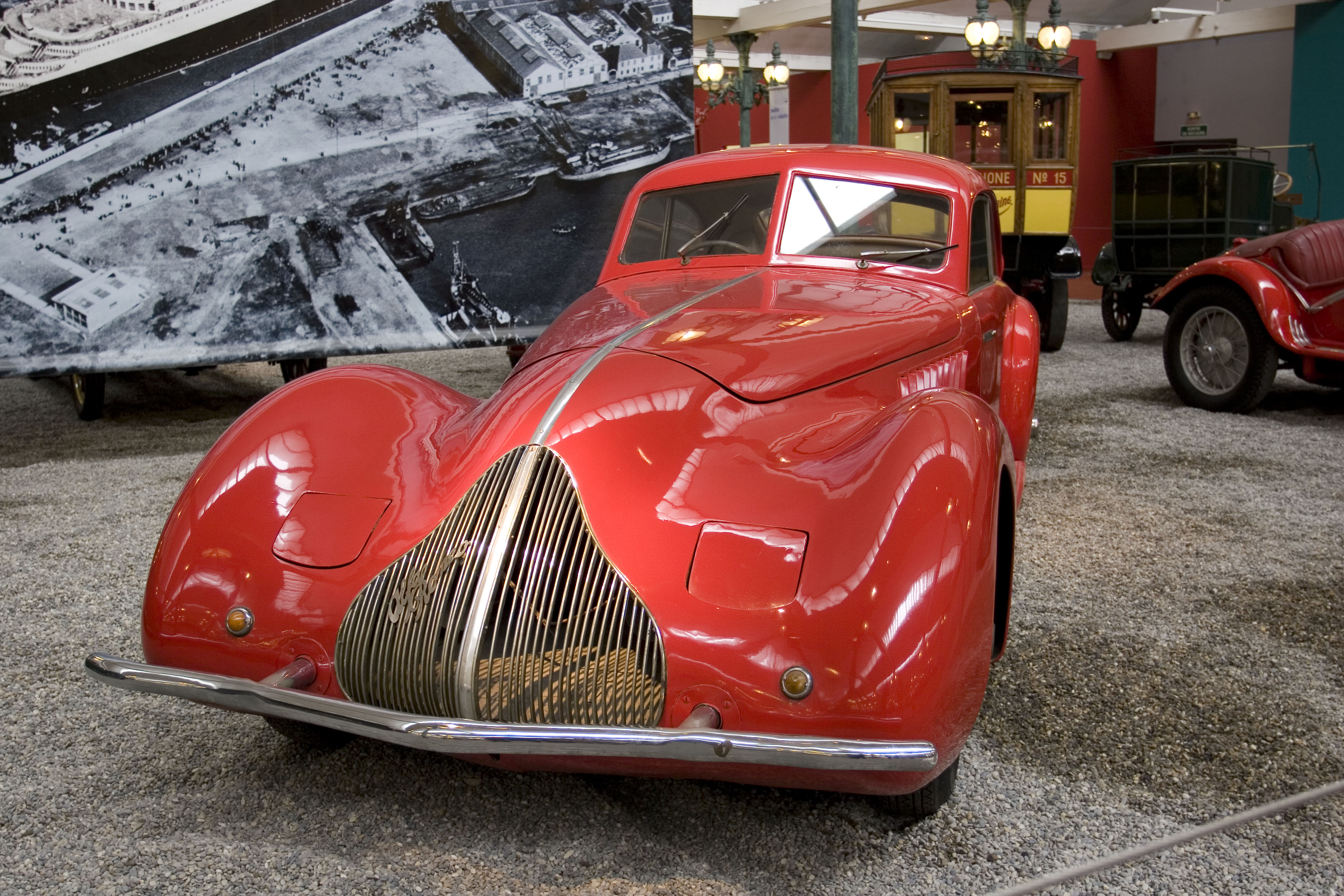
Alfa Romeo 8C 2900 A Pinin Farina Berlinetta

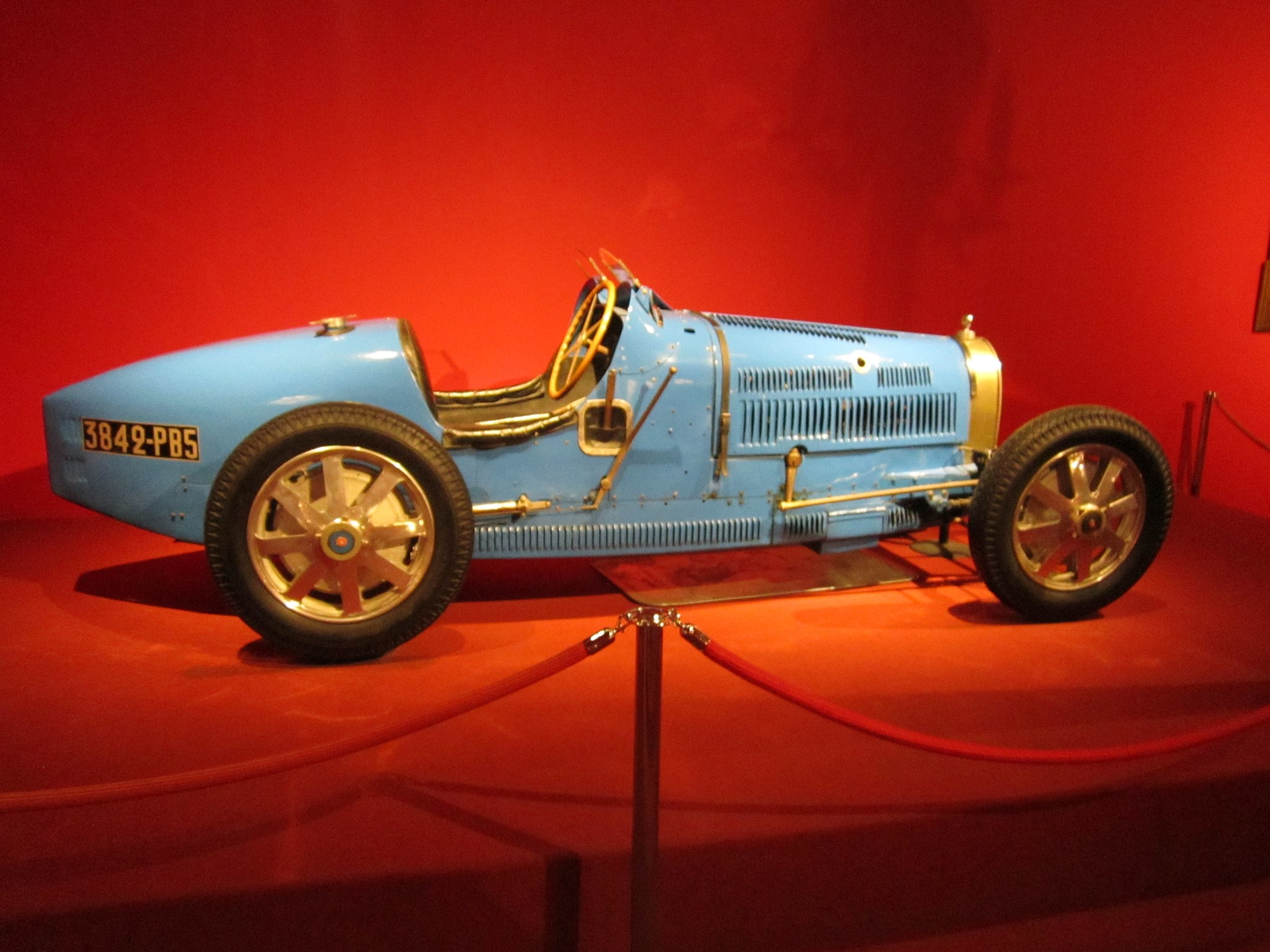
1929 Bugatti Type 35B

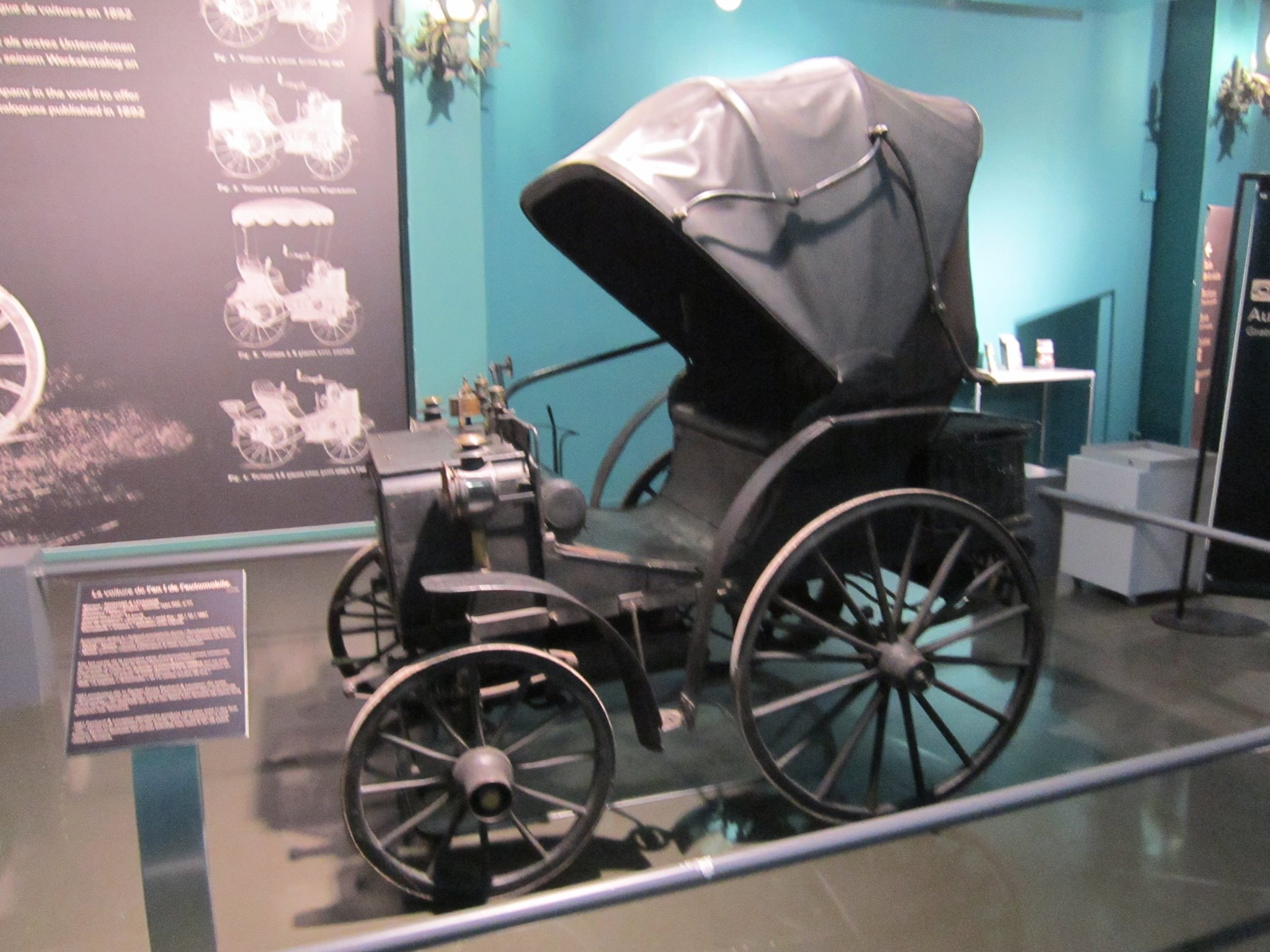
1891 Panhard & Levassor Phaeton

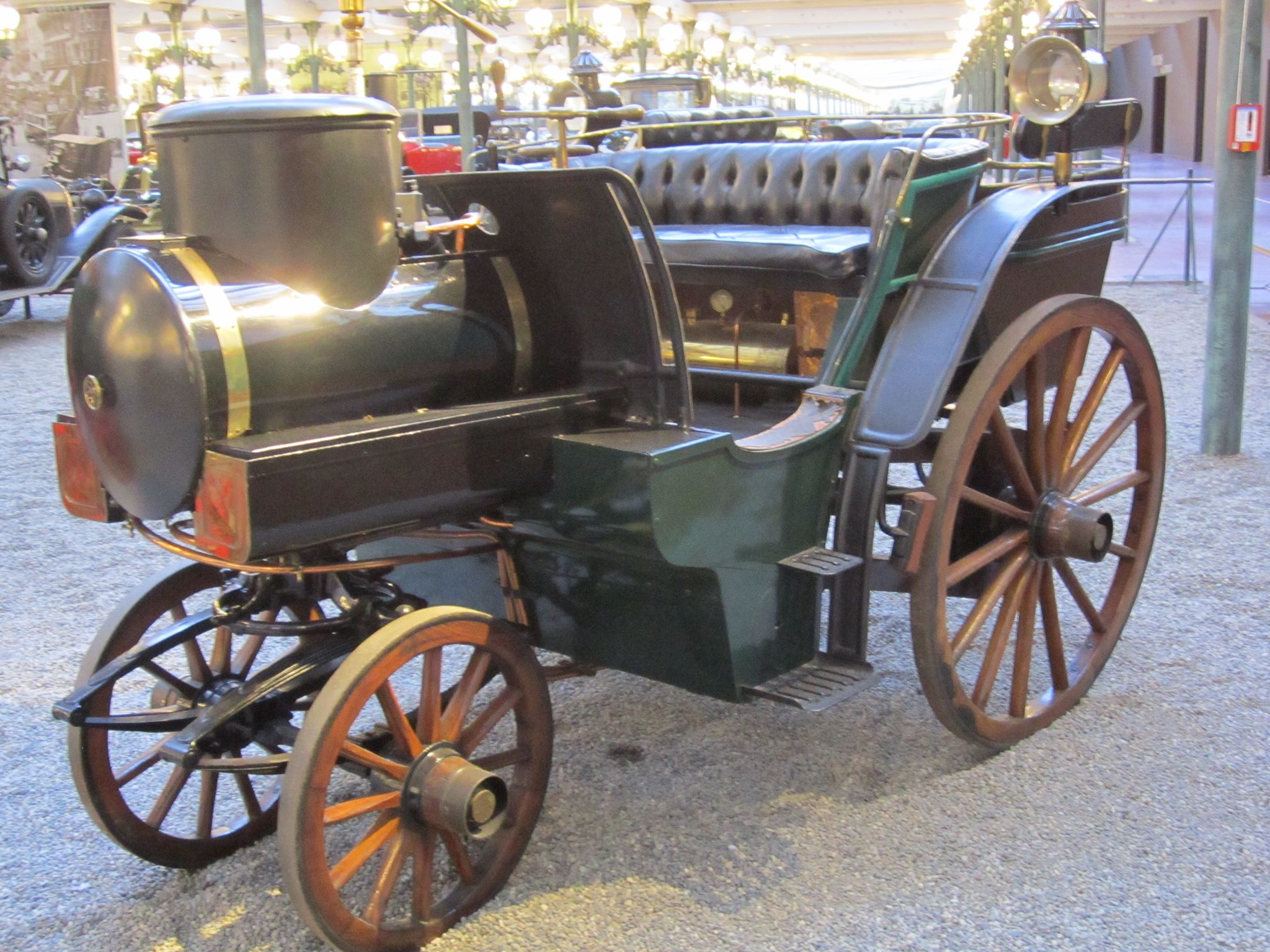
1878 Jacquot Tonneau a Vapeur

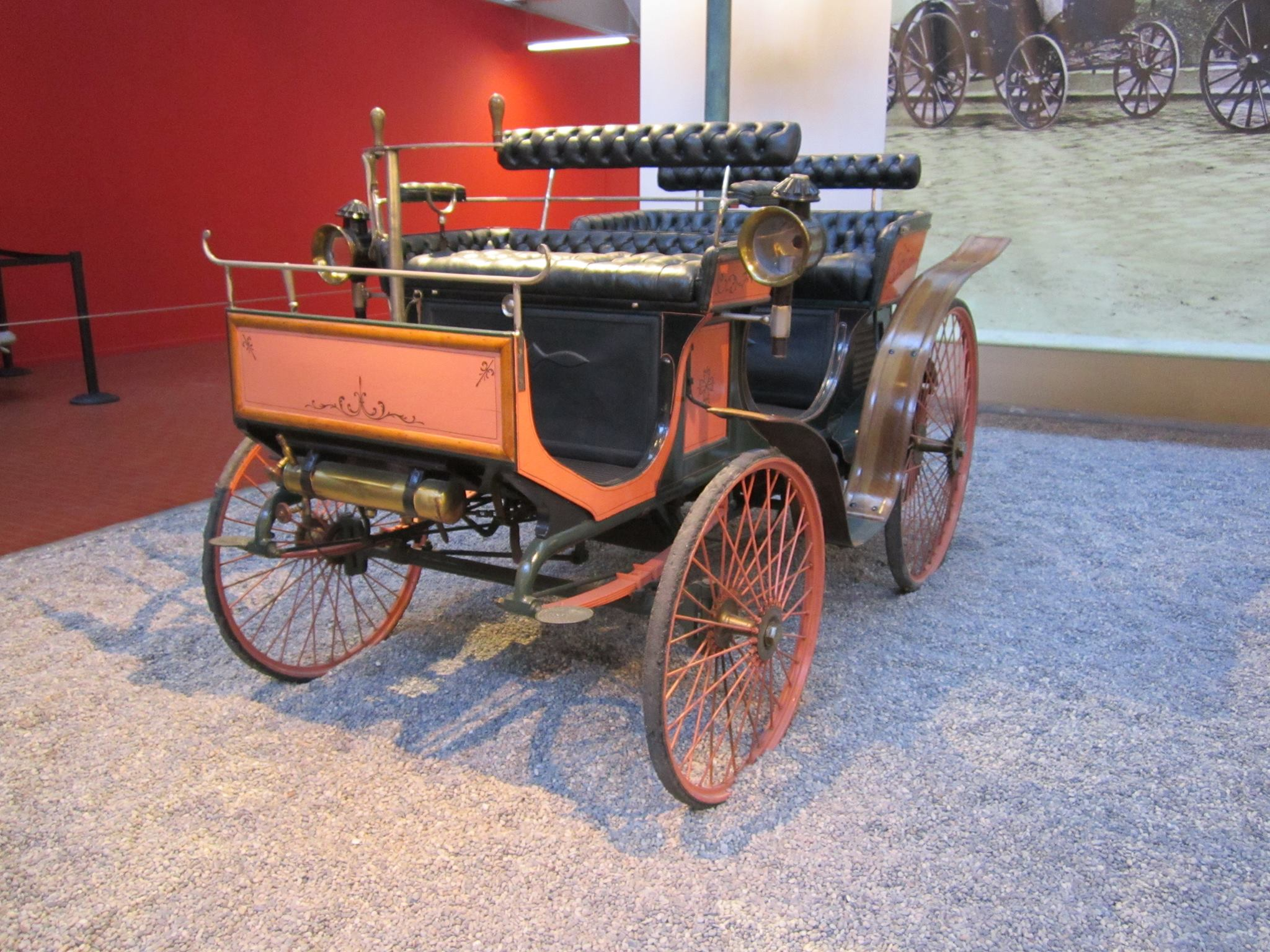
1893 Peugeot Phaetonnet Type 8
