= Peugeot Type 146 =

Vehicle model

Peugeot 146
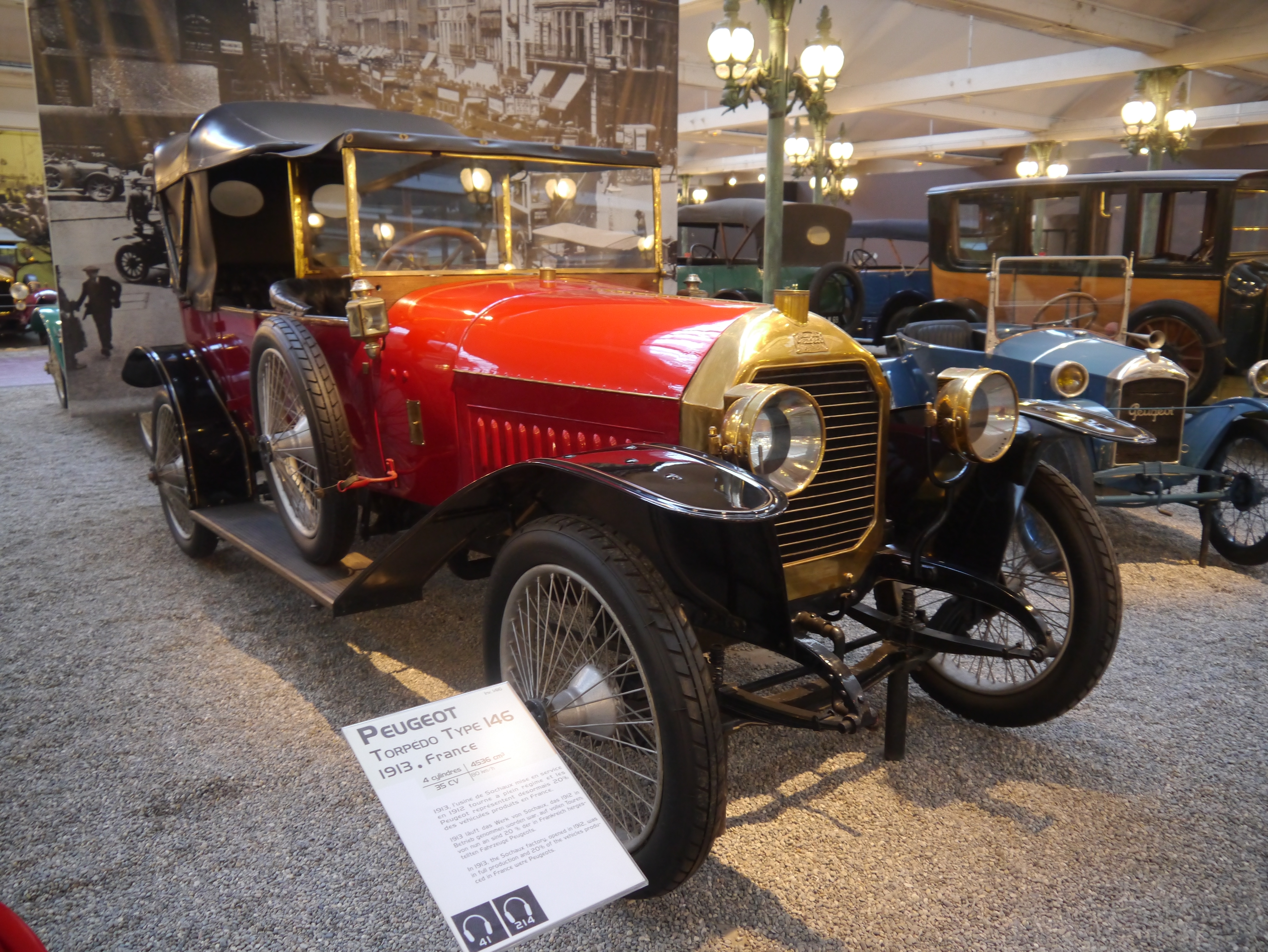
- Type 146 displayed at the Cité de l'Automobile, Mulhouse, France

Overview
- Manufacturer: Peugeot
- Production: 1913–1914

Body and chassis
- Body style: Torpedo

Powertrain
- Engine: 4,536 cc (5 L) V4 four-stroke engine

Dimensions
- Wheelbase: 348 cm (137 in)
- Length: 470 cm (185 in)
- Width: 173 cm (68 in)

The Peugeot 146 is an automotive model produced by Peugeot between 1913 and 1914.

== History ==
The engine of the car generated around 18 hp (13 kW), and has a speed of 75 km/h (47 mph). Carrying a full load, it can reach nearly 80 km/h (50 mph). The car, shown at a 1912 autoshow, carried a price of 13,000 francs.

During the First World War, the car was used as staff cars or ambulances. They were also used as fire-engines, because of their large chassis. A number of Peugeot 146s, along with Peugeot 148s and Peugeot 153s, were converted to armoured cars.

The Peugeot 146, including the variant 146S and colonial variant 146A, was produced in Lille. A total of 428 examples were produced.

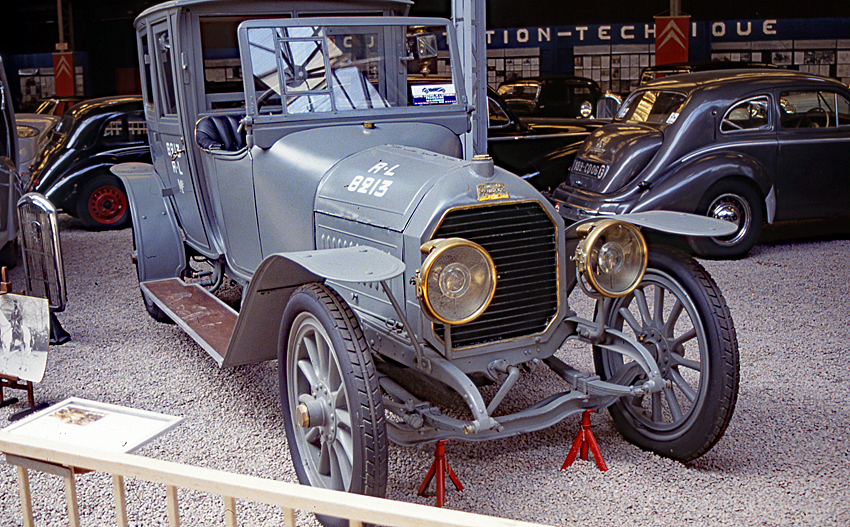
Peugeot Type 146, Gen Gouraud's staff car
