= Turicum (disambiguation) =

Turicum may refer to:

- Turicum (automobile), a Swiss automobile manufacturer
- Turicum (Zürich), a Roman vicus, now better known as the Swiss city of Zurich
- Turicum (ship, 1992), a passenger ship operating on Lake Zurich in Switzerland
