= Martin Fischer =

Martin Fischer may refer to:

- Martin Fischer (automobile designer) (1867–1947), designer of Turicum and Fischer brand names
- Martin Fischer (gymnast) (1884–1971), German-born American Olympic gymnast
- Martin Fischer (tennis) (born 1986), Austrian tennis player

== See also ==
- Martin Fischer-Dieskau (born 1954), German conductor
- Martin Fisher (disambiguation)
