= Arthur Adalbert Chase =

British cyclist

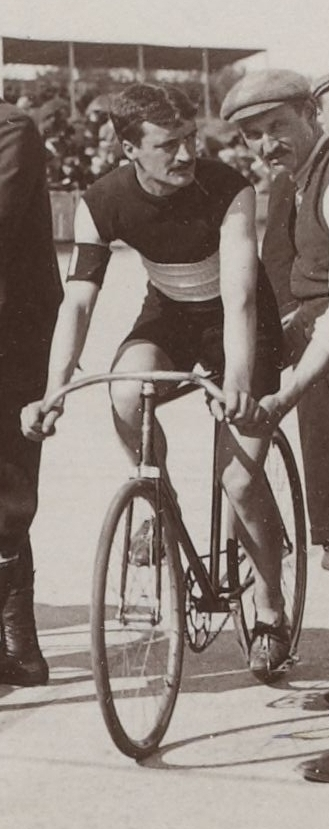
Arthur Chase pictured mid-race on July 29, 1900.

Arthur Adalbert Chase (6 June 1873 – 1951) was a British professional cyclist born in Blackheath, Kent.

== North Road Club ==
Chase was a member of the North Road Club when he began riding in 1887. He won his first race on Whit Monday 1892, at the Bishop Stortford Annual Sports in the one mile open race. In 1893, Chase took first place 13 times out of 14 events he entered. By the end of 1894, he had set a number of time and distance records, and toured Europe, the U.S., and Australia.

== Champion cyclist ==
Chase was a champion cyclist from 1896 to 1902. After retiring from the professional cycling scene, he teamed up with his brother Frederick Walter Chase to build motorcycles under the name Chase Brothers. Many years after the motorcycle enterprise, he lodged a patent for an exhaust silencer.

Chase was fined five shillings for cycling in 1898. Nine months later he was suspended for road racing. He was given another fine at Doncaster Borough Court in 1903. In 1936, he was in court in Southend-on-Sea.

== Cycling achievements ==
- June 1896 – World Record for 50 miles, taking 1 hour 45 minutes 38.6 seconds.
- August 1896 – Gold Medal at the ICA Track Cycling World Championships in Copenhagen, Denmark.
- August 1897 – Silver Medal at the ICA Track Cycling World Championships in Copenhagen, Denmark.
- June 1899 – England 'world record' for standing half mile of 54 seconds.
- July 1899 – World Record at Crystal Palace for 2 miles, in 3 minutes 25.2 seconds.
- August 1900 – World Record at Crystal Palace.
- September 1900 – Winner of the 100 km (62 mi) race at the Paris Olympics. Note at this time only amateurs were allowed an official olympic title.
- September 1901 – Fastest standing half-mile, 1 minute 38 seconds.
- September 1901 – Fastest mile in the UK, taking 1 minute 27.8 seconds.
- February 1903 – Beat T. Hall at Alexandra Palace Velodrome, a 1-mile flying start in 2 minutes 3.4 seconds.

== Pacing machine ==
Chase had been using pacing tandems in the past, and even rode behind an electric pacing tandem when he went up against the famous French cyclist Emile Bouhours in Paris in 1898.

The use of a fast pacer was not considered cheating at that time, and this must have motivated Chase to have a special pacer custom-made to his design. He commissioned a UK firm to build the machine at the start of 1899, a tandem with a rear-mounted De Dion-Bouton 1.75 hp engine. Both riders pedalled, the front one being responsible for steering, the rear for control of the engine. This pacer was capable of 39 mph at top speed.

== Tandems ==
Although Chase was a champion solo cyclist, he also tried his hand at tandem racing, along with Walters who would ride up front.
