= Soncin =

French automobile

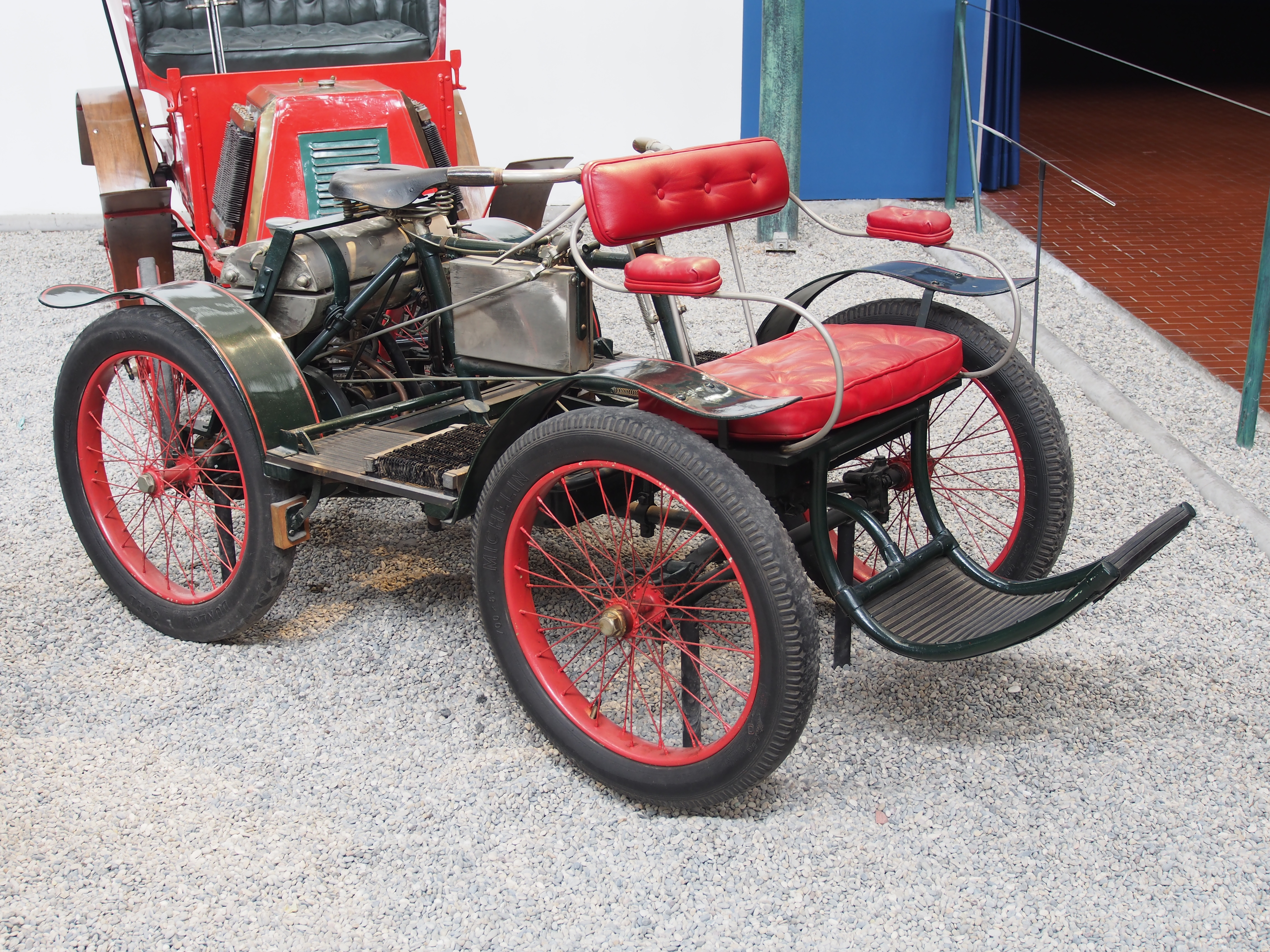
1901 Soncin at the Cité de l'Automobile

Soncin was a French automobile constructed by Louis Soncin and manufactured between 1900 and 1902. A two-seat 4½ hp voiturette, it was the forerunner of the Grégoire. A Soncin raced by Henri François Béconnais set the 1 km speed record (48 seconds) on September 21, 1899 at Achères, and the speed record of 91.8 km/h (57.0 mph) driving a Soncin at the «Semaine de Nice» on March 30, 1900. It was a frequently used racing vehicle of the days, such as in the Paris-Toulouse-Paris in July 1900, and a tricycle raced by L. Gastè won races at Targa Rignano (1900 and 1901). A Soncin 10 hp won the Coppa Brescia on September 10, 1900.

Specially-tuned Soncin engines were also used by Chase Brothers Motorcycle company.
