= Guido Bigio =

Italian racing driver

Guido Bigio (July 28, 1881 – May 22, 1913) was an Italian racing car driver and chemical engineer.

Born at Busalla, Province of Genoa, he was founder of the Turin-based Itala car manufacturer (with Matteo Ceirano and others), becoming general manager and development director in 1905.

Bigio also raced these cars, such as being second in the Targa Rignano (1904).

He and his technician Crescentino Ardizzone died in an accident at Dieppe, testing an Itala two months before the 1913 French Grand Prix.
