= Martin Fisher (disambiguation) =

Martin Fisher was a politician.

Martin Fisher may also refer to:

- Martin Fisher (actor) on List of EastEnders characters
- Marty Fisher, Martin 'Marty' Fisher, Shameless fictional character
- Dr. Martin Fisher, businessmen
- Martin Fisher (zoologist), see Silver Medal
- Martin Fisher (inventor), see Lemelson–MIT Prize

== See also ==
- Martin Fischer (disambiguation)
