= Dufaux automobile =

Dufaux
- Industry: Automotive
- Founded: 1904
- Founder: Charles Dufaux; Frédéric Dufaux
- Defunct: 1907
- Fate: Ceased production
- Products: Automobiles

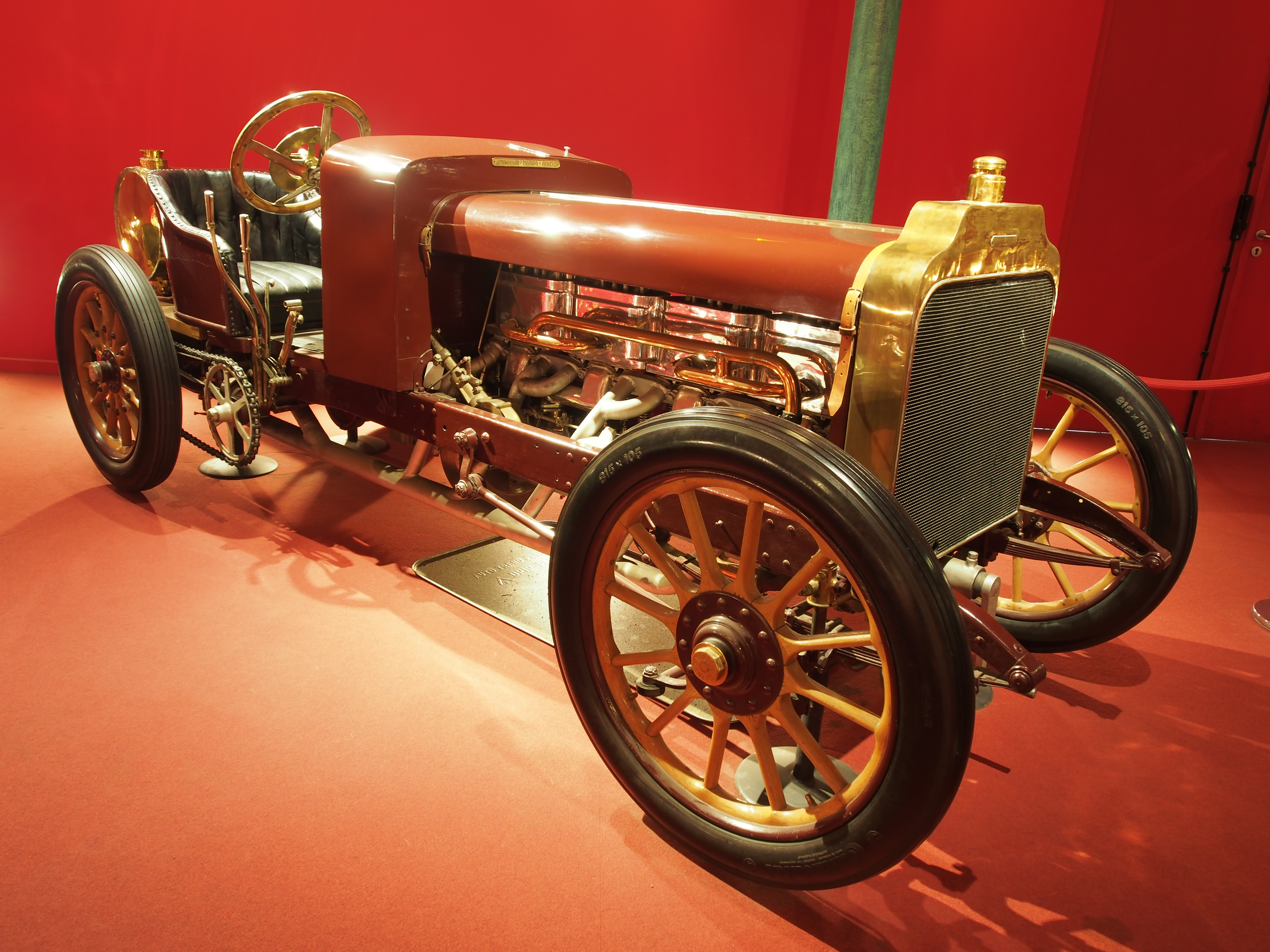
The original Dufax automobile

Dufaux was a Swiss car manufacturer established in Geneva in 1904 by Charles and Frédéric Dufaux.

The first Dufaux was built to enter the famous Gordon Bennett Cup race, held that year in the region of Taunus near Frankfurt am Main. The car had an eight-in-line engine with a displacement of no less than 12,760 cc, delivering 80 bhp (60 kW) at 1300 rpm. The event was a total failure for the Dufaux brothers as their car with the number 7 not even could start because of a broken wheel. This car still exists and is permanently exhibited at the Musée Nationale de l'automobile (Collection Schlumpf / Cité de l'Automobile) in Mulhouse (France). As Frenchman Léon Théry on Richard-Brasier won the race, France had to organize the cup for 1905.

Later, the brothers won a race at Geneva over a distance of one kilometer at an average speed of 72 mph (116 km/h).

At a second race in Paris, the brothers came in second place. The car had actually been driven from Switzerland to Paris in less than 10 hours.

The official Gordon Bennett homepage mentions an 80 HP Dufaux with a straight eight-cylinder engine entering the 1905 event. The race was held in the Auvergne near Paris. As the result list neither mentions the Dufaux brother nor their car, it is safe to conclude that they didn't make it to the start. Again, Léon Théry on Richard-Brasier won the cup. This was the last Gordon Bennett cup for automobiles.

Another model built by the brothers was given a monstrous four-cylinder engine with 26,400 cc. This big engine gave more than 150 bhp (110 kW). Frédéric Dufaux broke with this car the world record on 13 November 1905 at a speed of 98 mph (158 km/h) . He completed a kilometer in just 23 seconds.

In 1906, more cars were built. Most of them had a smaller four-cylinder engine. An eight-cylinder with 120 bhp (89 kW) was also built. In a hill climb in Marchairuz in 1906, four Dufaux models took place in the starting line. Two of them were eight-cylinders with 12,760 cc and 14,449 cc, respectively, and one a more modern four-cylinder with 4,400 cc.

Unfortunately, manufacturing of race cars became too expensive, so they ceased production in 1907.
