= Prinetti & Stucchi =

Italian manufacturing company

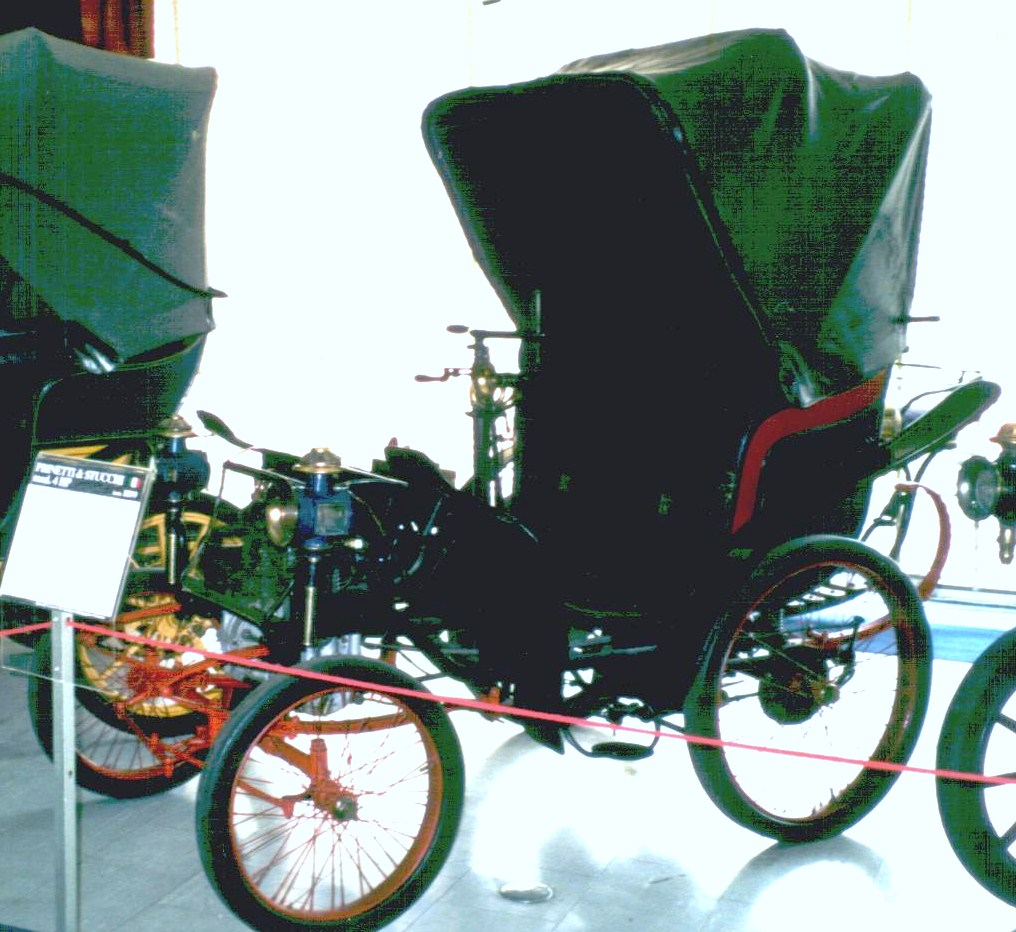
1899 Prinetti & Stucchi 4 HP

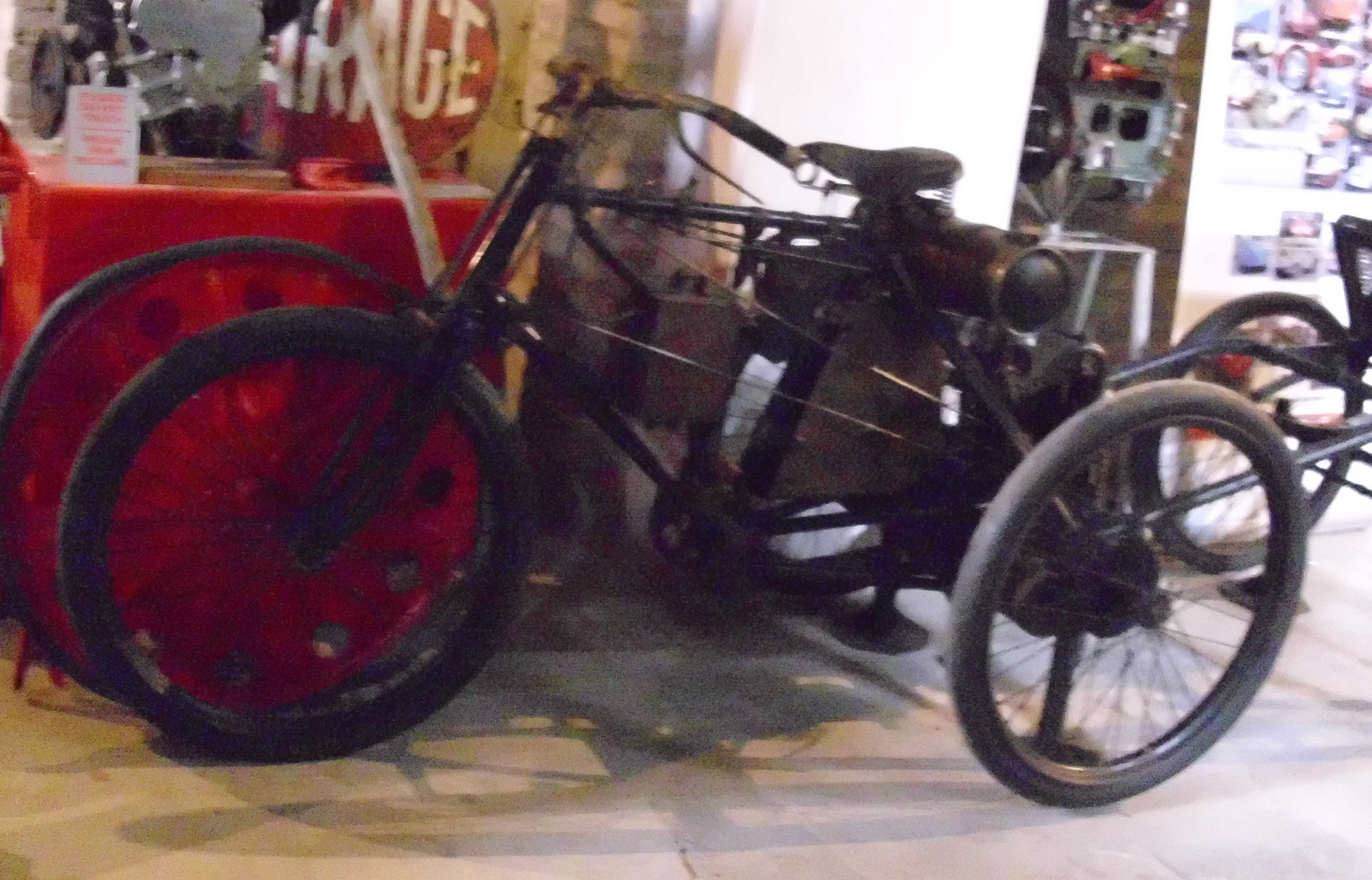
1899 tricycle

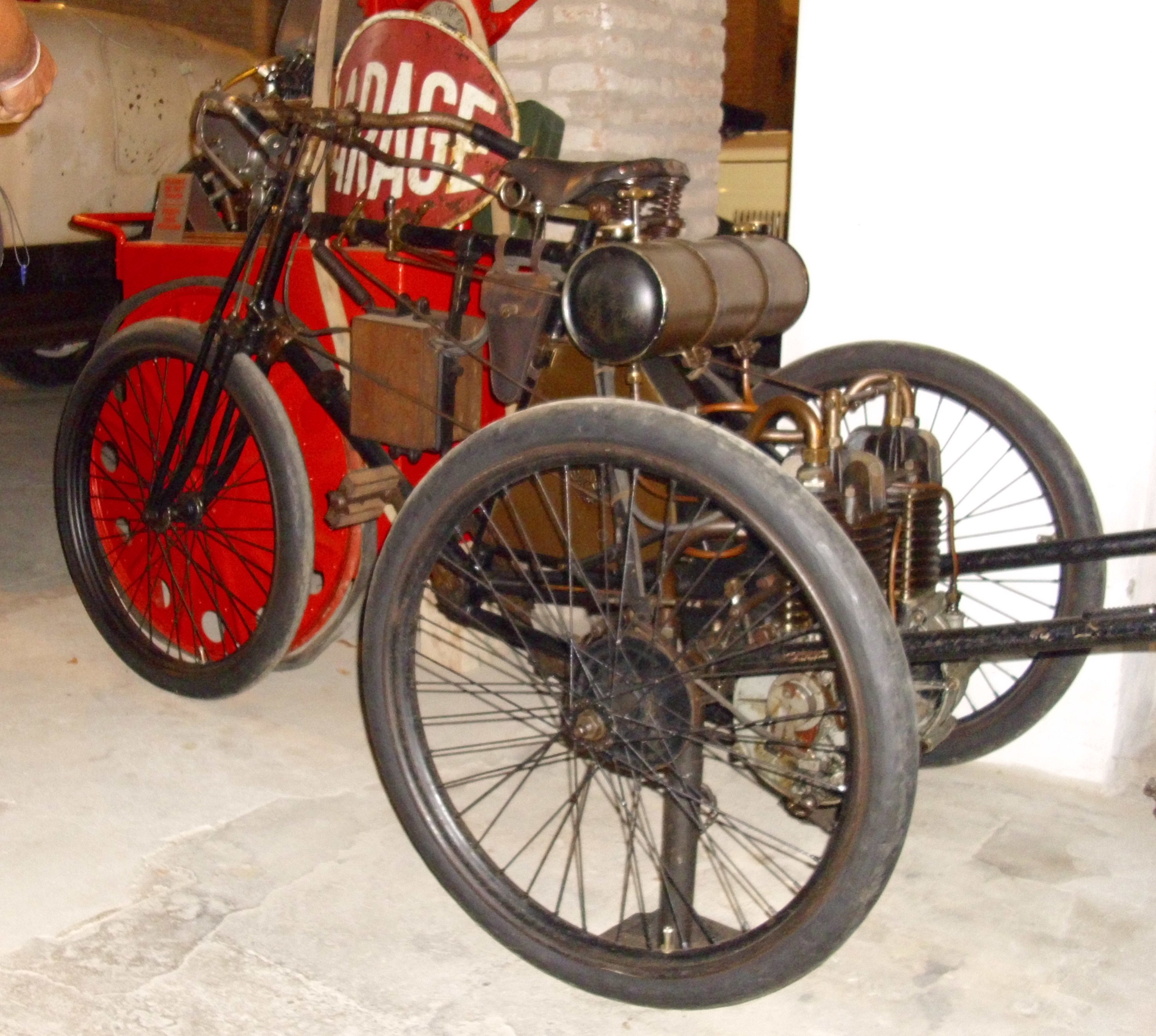
1899 tricycle

Prinetti & Stucchi, later Stucchi & Co., was an Italian maker of sewing machines, bicycles and motorized vehicles, established in Milan in 1883. It was owned by engineers and politicians Augusto Stucchi and Giulio Prinetti (1851–1908).

== Cycle manufacture ==
In 1892 Stucchi Prinetti & Stucchi began manufacturing bicycles.

In 1914 Alfonso Calzolari rode a Stucchi to victory in the Giro d'Italia, and the 1919 Giro d'Italia was won by Costante Girardengo on a Stucchi.

== Motor manufacture ==
In 1899 Prinetti & Stucchi started manufacturing motorized tricycles and quadricycles. The Tipo 1, a motorized tricycle utilizing two De Dion engines and a Rochet-Schneider frame, was designed by Ettore Bugatti. In 1900 Bugatti participated in the Targa Rignano in a quadricycle.

As appears in the magazine "El Fígaro" on September 3, In 1899, the first motorcycle entered Havana, Cuba. A Prinetti & Stucchi brand tricycle. I had a benzine engine, Prinetti patent, design simple, easy to maneuver, based on a frame that joined the three wheels or support points; its engine was placed in the center of gravity, looking this one that made it a stable motorcycle on any type of surface. At those moments the French-made DeDion Bouton engine, led the motorized market.

In 1901 the company was renamed Stucchi & Co. when Giulio Prinetti left to become Italian minister of foreign affairs 1901-03. The reorganisation also triggered Ettore Bugatti's emigration to France where he established the Bugatti car works.

Automobile production stopped in 1906.

== Electrical company ==
The Stucchi-Prinetti family founded the Società Generale Elettrica dell'Adamello electric company in 1907.

== Family ==
The family owns the Badia a Coltibuono castle in Tuscany.

== See also ==
- List of bicycle parts
- List of Italian companies
