= Targa Rignano =

The Padova–Bovolenta race (1900–1908) was an automobile, voiturette and motorcycle race. The first day had a 10-kilometre (6.2 mi) straight race speedrecord track between the cities of Padua and Bovolenta in Italy, followed by a 1-kilometre (0.62 mi) race in Padua the next day. The name Targa Rignano was only used in 1902, 1903 and 1904, as conte Rignano was involved. The race was not held from 1905 to 1908, and after a fatal spectator accident involving Diatto-driver Dal Torso (1908), the Italian Parliament asked for it to end.

== Results ==
- I, July 2, 1900: L. Gastè in a three-wheeler vehicle Soncin (8m02s), followed by Ettore Bugatti in a Prinetti & Stucchi quadricycle and Vincenzo Lancia in a FIAT 6 HP.
- June 28, 1901: Ugobaldo Tonietti in a Panhard 30HP (6m39s). L. Gastè won the sprint in a Soncin tricycle (43.2s).
- October 27, 1902: Vincenzo Florio in a Panhard 40HP (5m21s) followed by Vincenzo Lancia in a FIAT 24 HP Corsa and Luigi Storero in a FIAT 12 HP. The sprint ended in the same order.
- October 25, 1903: Felice Nazzaro in a Panhard 70HP (5m12s), followed by Pierre de Caters in a Mors and Alexander Burton in a De Dietrich 45HP. The sprint ended in the same order.
- October 16, 1904: Vincenzo Florio in a Darracq 80HP (4m48s). He also won the sprint, followed by Guido Bigio in an Itala 24HP .
- April 10, 1908: Vincenzo Trucco in an Isotta Fraschini (4m53s), followed by Nando Minoia in an Isotta Fraschini and Domenico Piccoli in a SPA. No sprint was held.
