= Chase Brothers Motorcycle =

British motorcycle maker

Chase Brothers Motorcycle was a British motorcycle maker.

== Origins ==
Arthur Chase was a professional bicycle racer, his brother Frederick Walter Chase a former works rider for BAT in 1902.

In 1903, the brothers co-founded a motorcycle company, relying on their racing reputation and F.W.'s well-known tuning skills. It was powered by a 2.75 hp (2.05 kW) Soncin engine.

The company folded in 1906.

No examples are known to survive.
