= Esculape =

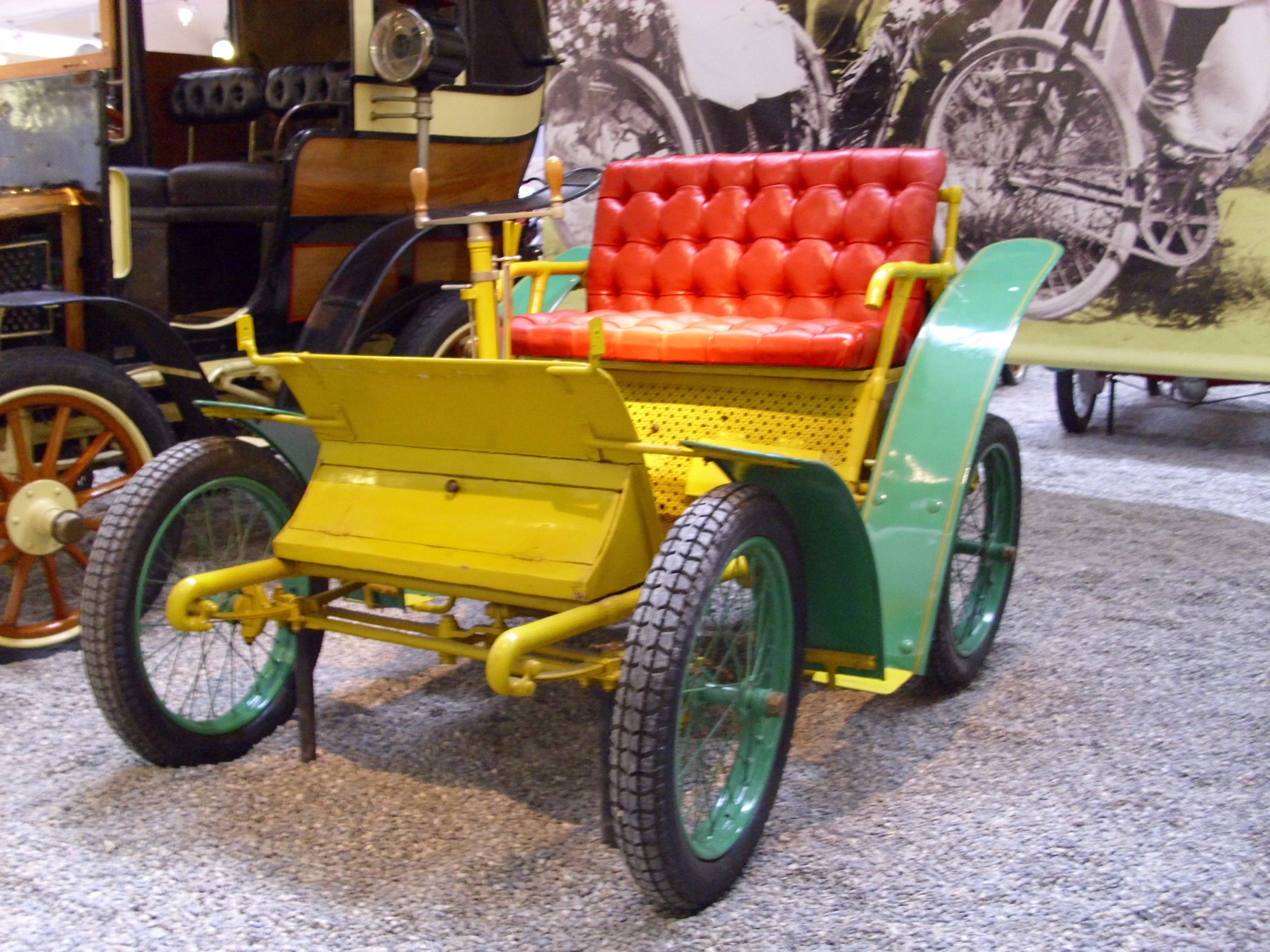
Esculape

The Esculape was a French automobile manufactured only in 1899. Advertised as being "worked by an improved De Dion-Bouton motor, strengthened by a water current", it was said by its Paris-based makers, the Automobile Union, to be "fast, silent, and vibrationless".
