= Martin Fischer (automobile designer) =

Swiss automobile designer

Martin Fischer (1867–1947) was a Swiss automobile designer who built cars under the Turicum and Fischer names. He began his career as a watchmaker. Some of his cars still survive.
