= Maurer-Union =

German car maker

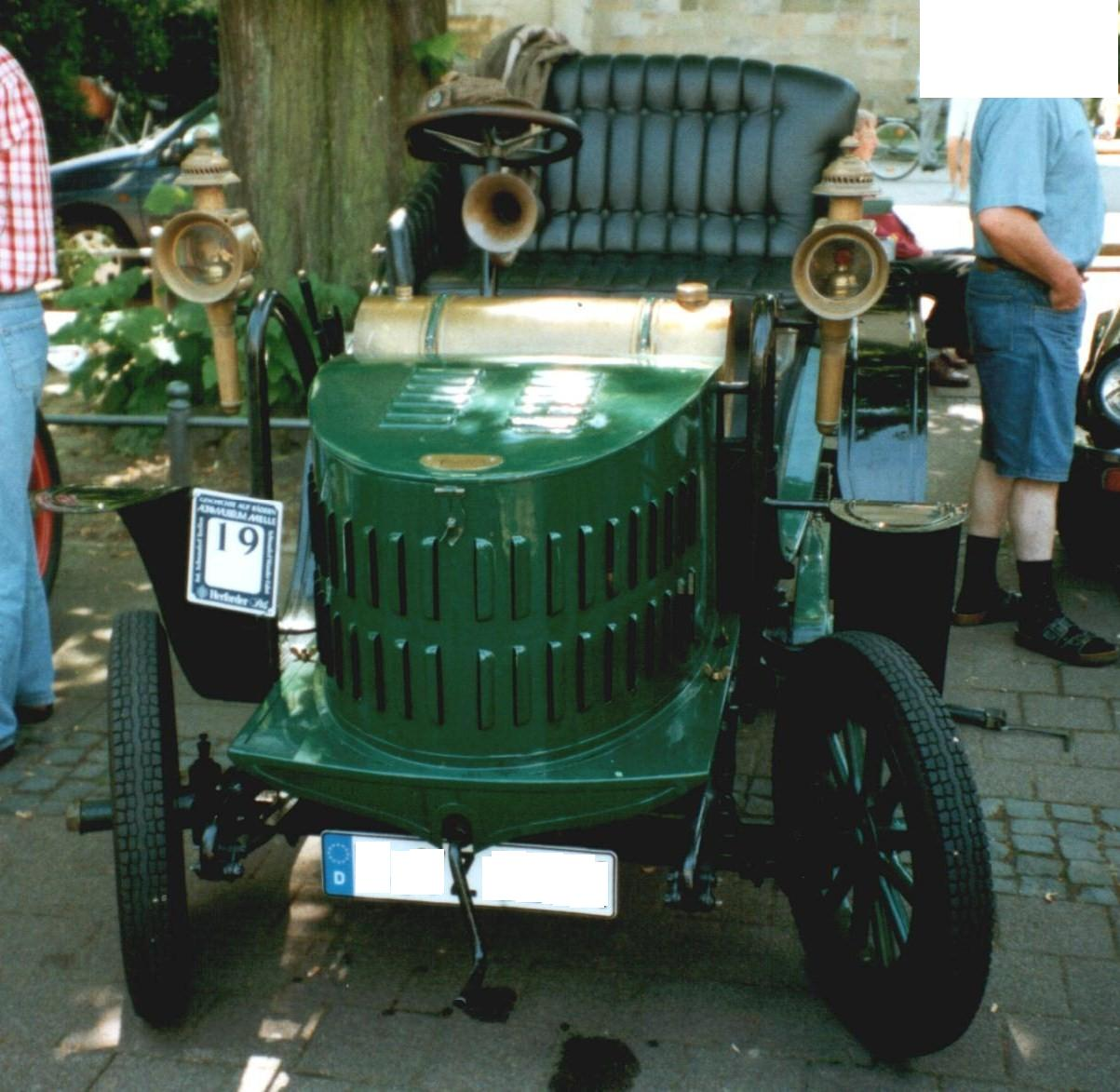
1902 Maurer-Union

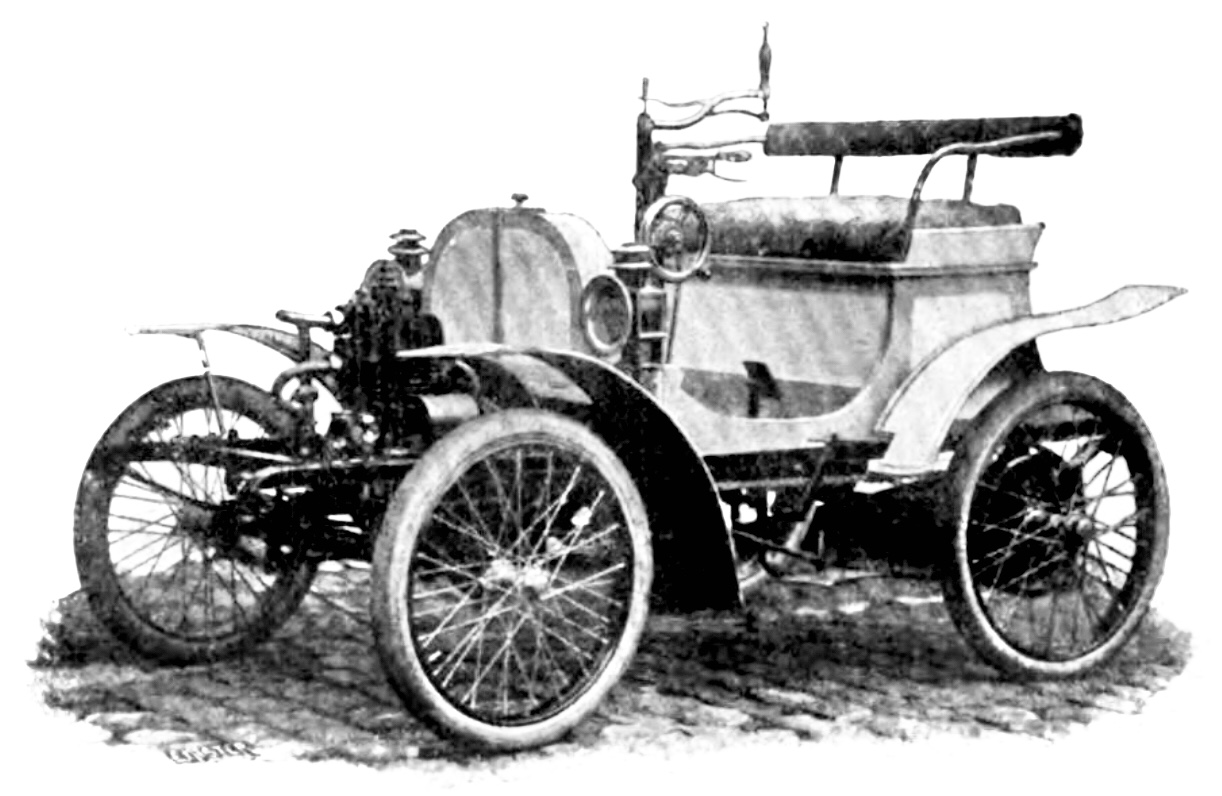
Maurer-Union (1902)

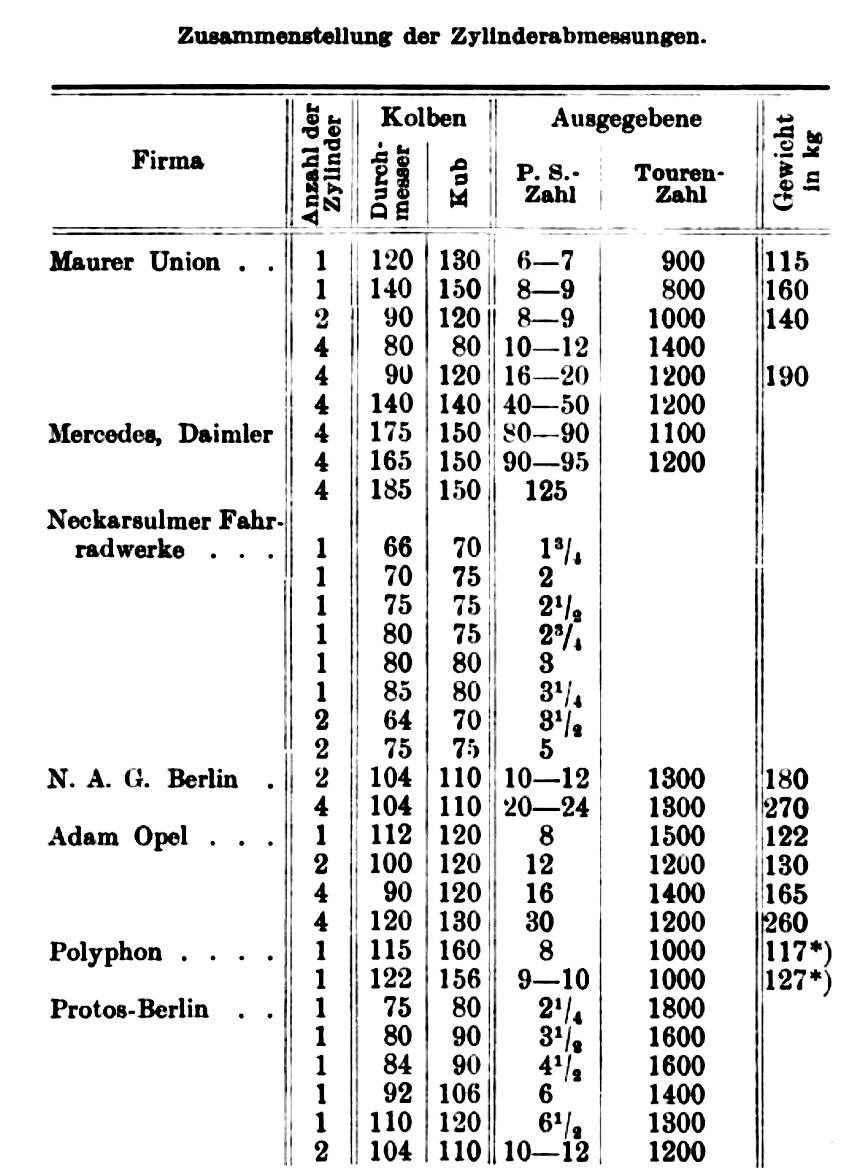
Engine data Maurer-Union (1906)

Maurer-Union was a German car maker located in Nuremberg. From 1900–1910, Maurer-Union produced 300 to 400 cars per year. It was one of the first manufacturers that introduced continuously variable transmission using a friction drive.
