= Horlacher =

Horlacher is a surname. Notable people with the surname include:

- Cody Horlacher (born 1987), American lawyer and politician
- Fred Horlacher (1910–1943), Irish footballer
- Michael Horlacher (1888–1957), German politician
