= Turicum (automobile) =

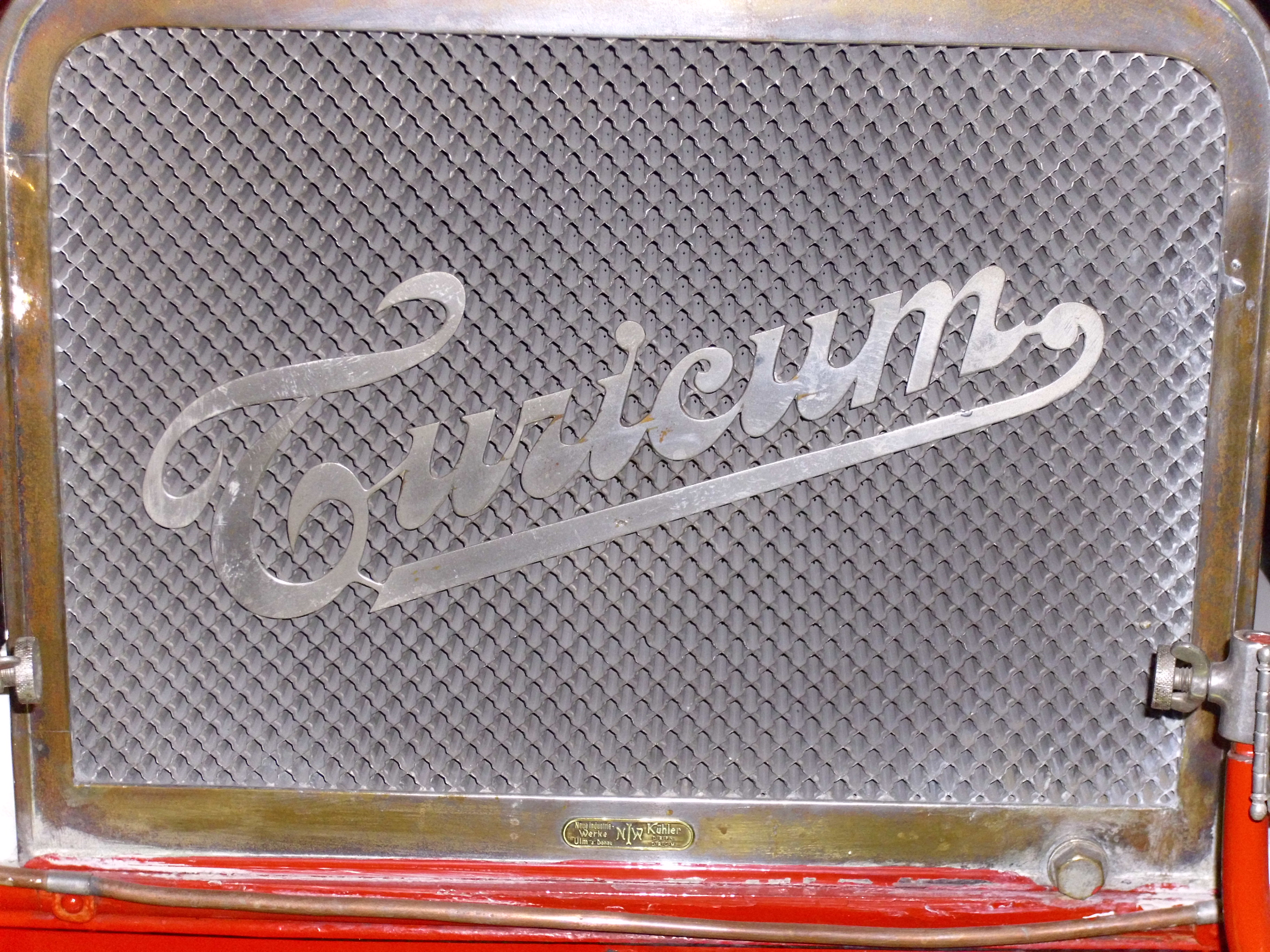
Lettering on the radiator grille

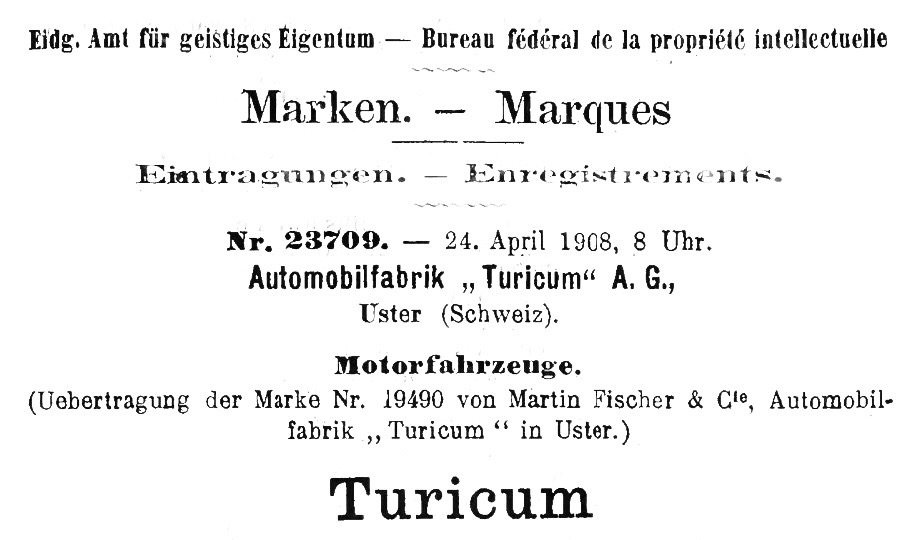
Transfer of rights from Martin Fischer to Turicum (1908)

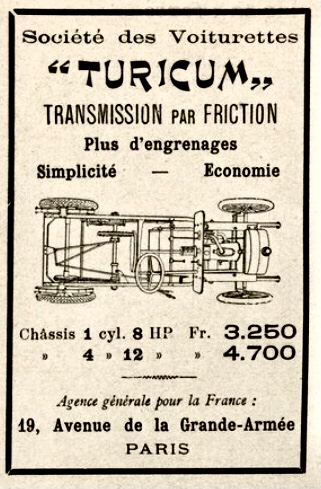
Turicum advertisement from 1909

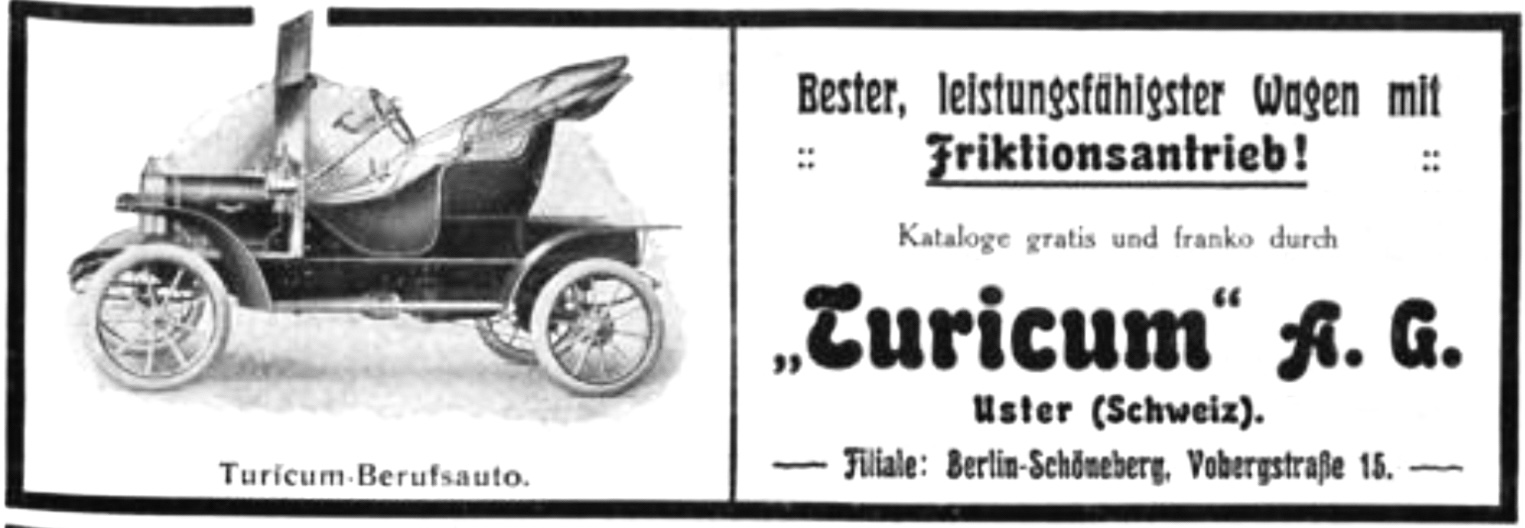
Turicum (1909).

The Turicum was a Swiss automobile manufactured from 1904 to 1906 in Zürich and from 1907 to 1912 in Uster. The car's name Turicum is the Latin name of Zürich. The first car made by Martin Fischer was a small single-seater go-kart like vehicle. The car was 140 cm (55 in) long, with pedal-operated steering and powered by a motorcycle engine. The car had a chain drive, while a second prototype had a friction drive. The friction drive consisted of a flat steel disc coupled to the engine that drove a small, leather-covered wheel running at right angles to its surface. The small wheel could be moved across the surface of the large disc, giving a variable gear ratio. The cars attracted little public interest. Swiss industrialist Jakob Heusser was involved in the venture.

On July 1, 1920, the shareholders of the Automobile and Machine Factory Turikum decided to reduce the value of shares from 250 Swiss francs to 50 francs. This reduced the capital from 450,000 francs to just 90,000 francs. Now, there are a total of 1,800 shares in circulation.

== Production cars ==
Conventional production cars were manufactured in Uster, with a steering wheel and two-seater body were shown at the Paris Salon in 1906. The cars had a single-cylinder air-cooled engine of 785 cc (47.9 cu in) capacity. A false radiator was fitted that acted as a fuel tank. The friction drive was retained and would be used on future cars.

In 1907, a 10/12 hp model with four-cylinder engine of 1,385 cc (84.5 cu in) was introduced, and the single-cylinder model had its engine enlarged to 1,045 cc (63.8 cu in). Two and four-seat, open and closed bodies were offered. Fisher left the company in September of 1907. At the automobile, bicycle, and motorboat exhibition in Zurich in 1907, Turicum presented light two-seater cars with an engine power of seven to eight hp. On the same basis, light delivery vans with a payload of 300 kg were also available. In 1912, a 16/26 model with 2,613 cc (159.5 cu in) engine was announced and could be ordered with a conventional gearbox. In 1918 a total of 90 Turicum were produced.

== Exports ==
Sales in the home country were good, and cars were exported to Egypt, Italy, France, Germany, England, Denmark, Russia, Poland, Hungary, Turkey, Argentina, and South Africa. The company hit financial problems, and Production ended in 1912.

== Preservation ==
Eleven cars still survive.

== Gallery ==
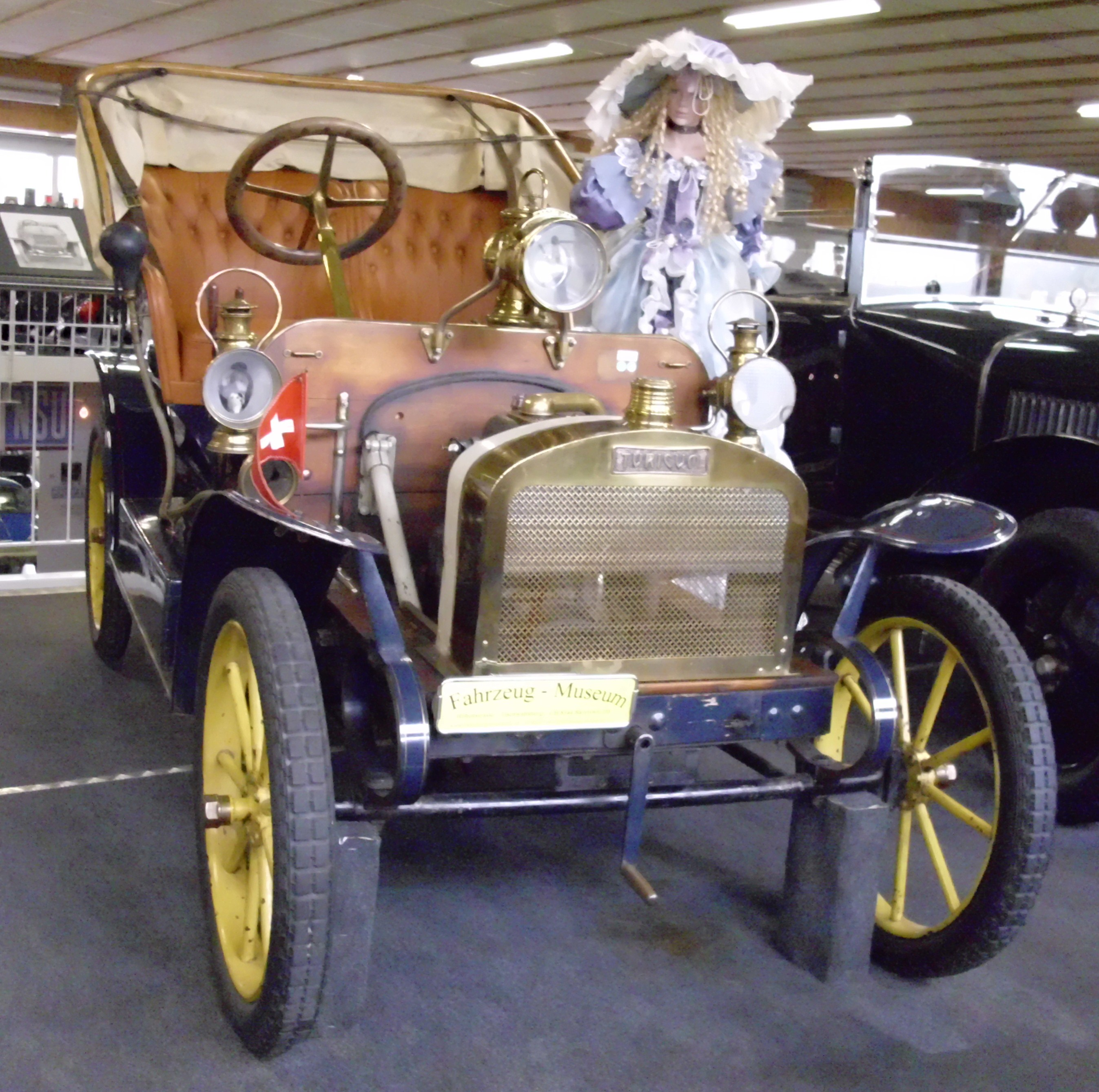
1907 Turicum

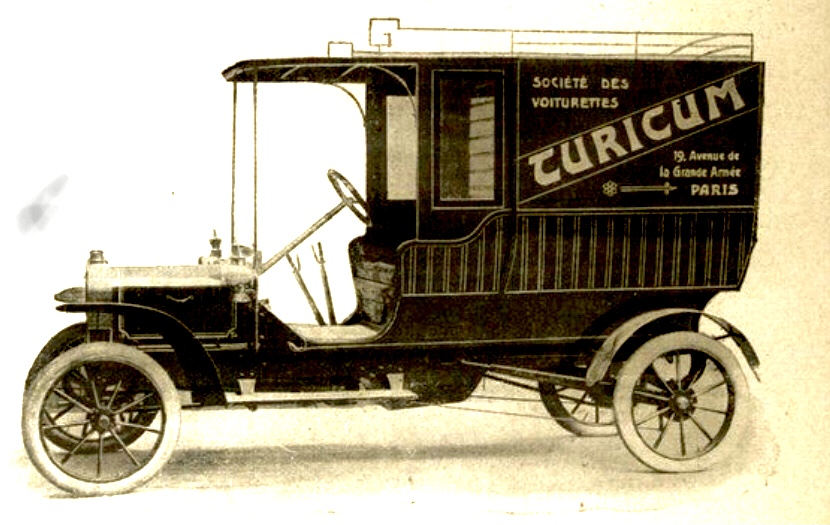
1909 Turicum

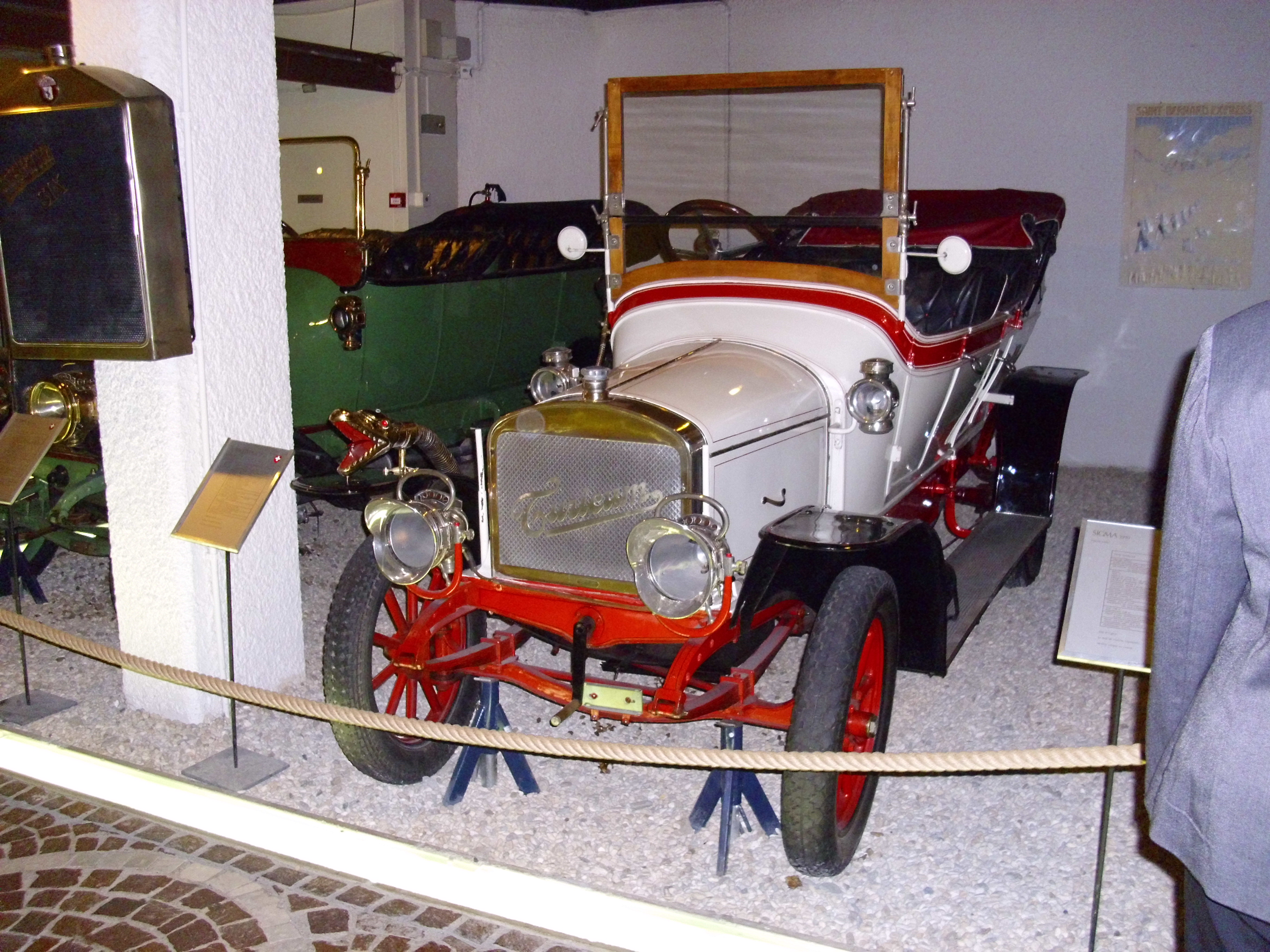
1910 Turicum

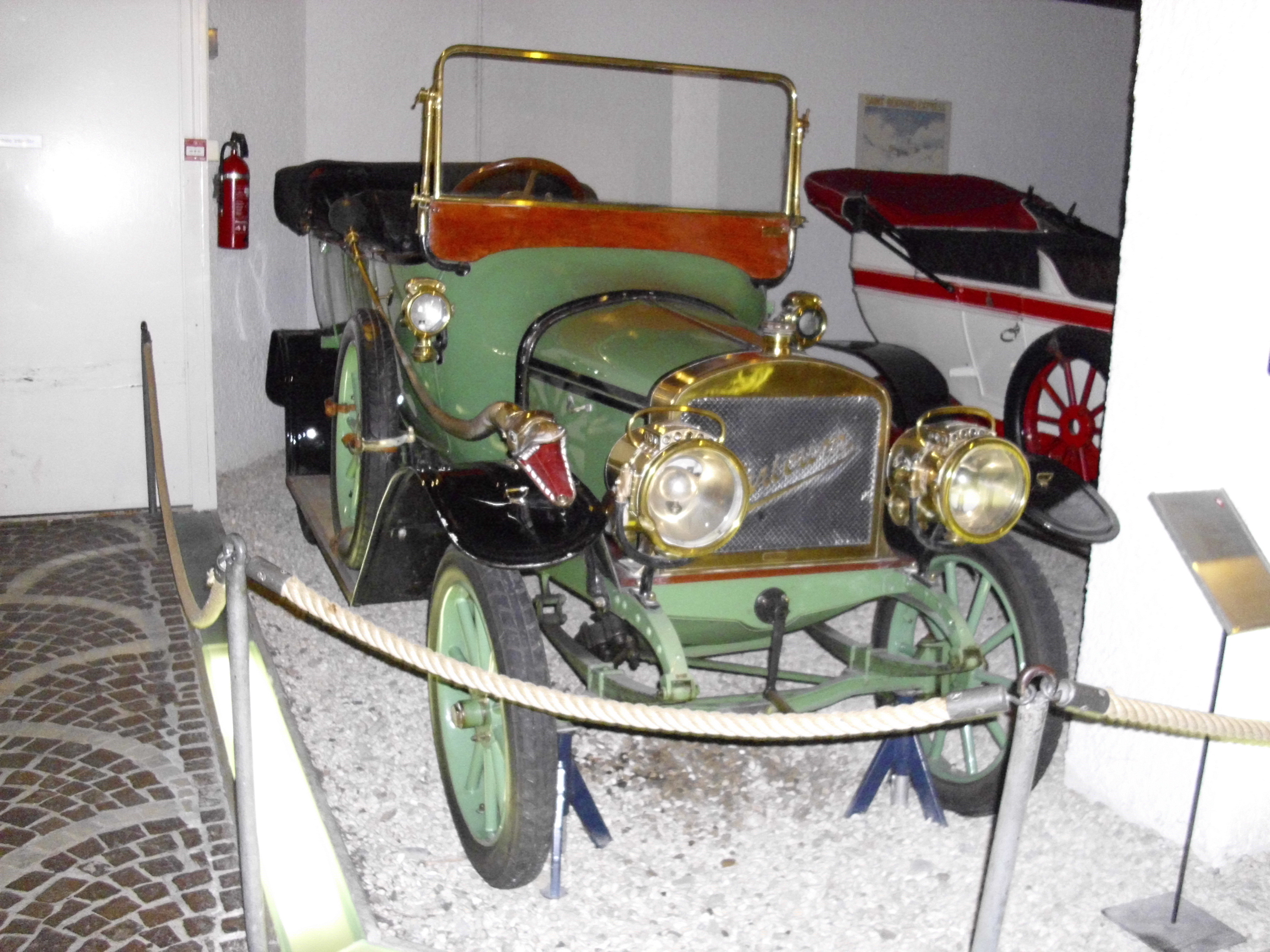
1911 Turicum

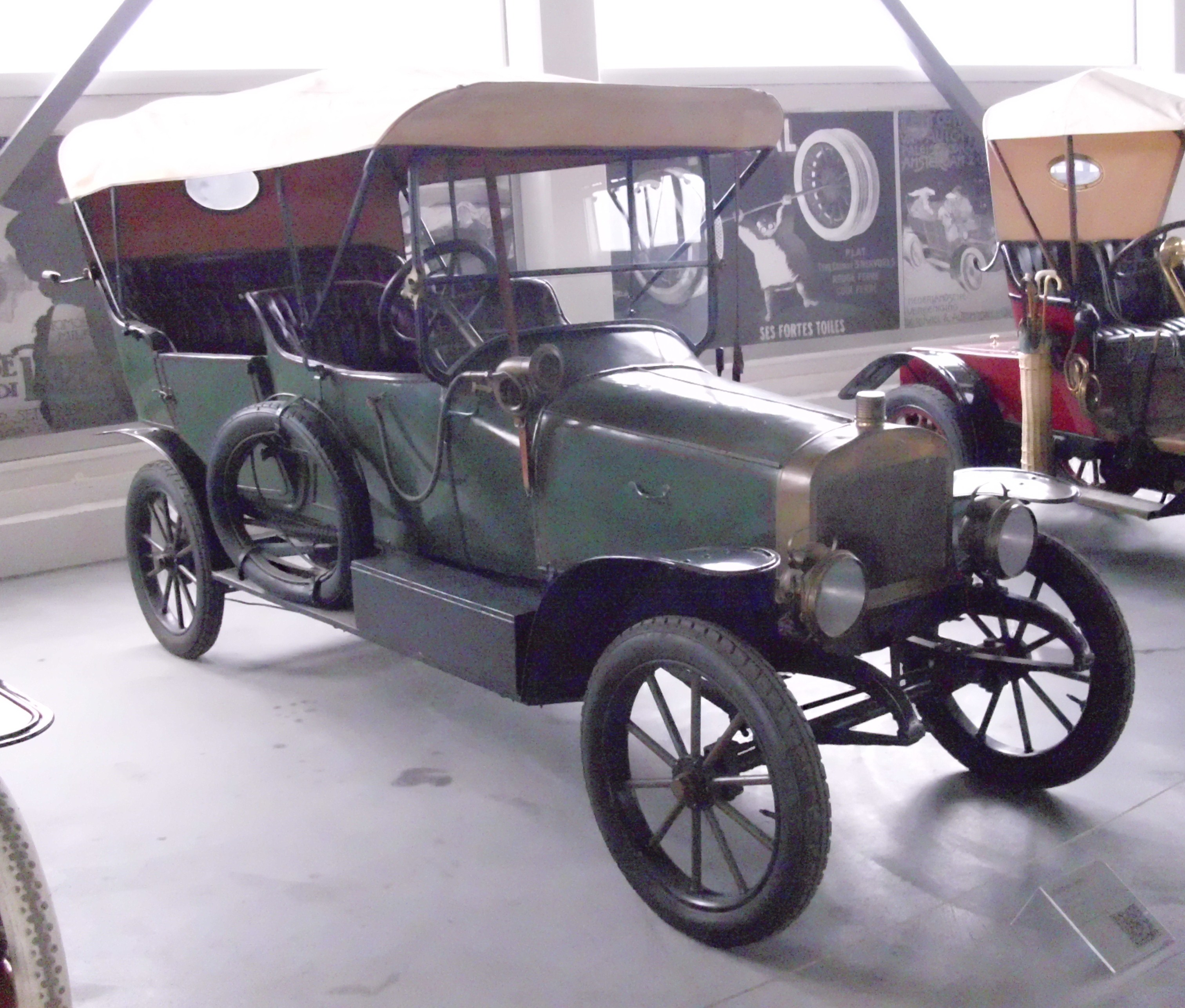
1912 Turicum (supposedly from 1907)
