= Bugatti Royale =

Bugatti Type 41
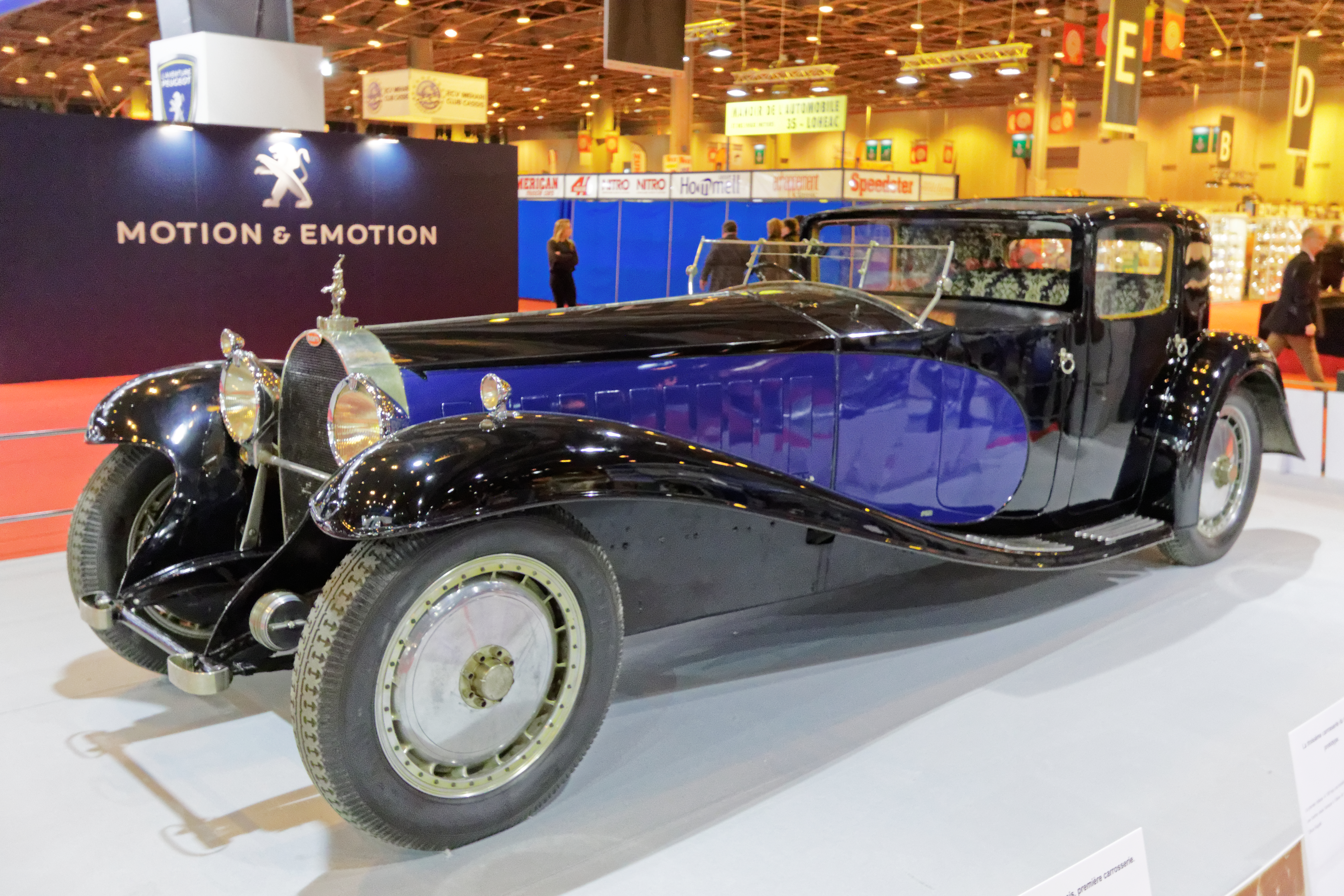
- 1929 Type 41 "Coupé Napoléon"

Overview
- Manufacturer: Bugatti
- Also called: Bugatti Royale
- Production: 1927–1933; 7 produced
- Assembly: France: Molsheim, Alsace (Usine Bugatti de Molsheim)

Body and chassis
- Class: Luxury car
- Body style: Berline, coupé, cabriolet, roadster, brougham, coupé de ville
- Layout: Front-engine, rear-wheel-drive

Powertrain
- Engine: 12,763 cc (12.8 L; 778.8 cu in) I8
- Transmission: 3-speed manual

Dimensions
- Wheelbase: ~4.3 m (169.3 in)
- Length: ~6.4 m (252.0 in)
- Width: ~2.1 m (82.7 in)
- Curb weight: ~3,175 kg (7,000 lb)

The Bugatti Type 41, better known as the Royale, is a large luxury car built by Bugatti from 1927 to 1933, With a 4.3 m (169.3 in) wheelbase and 6.4 m (21 ft) overall length, it weighs approximately 3,175 kg (7,000 lb) and uses a 12.763 litre (778 cu in) straight-eight engine. For comparison, against the Rolls-Royce Phantom VII (produced from 2003 to 2017), the Royale is about 20% longer, and more than 25% heavier. This makes the Royale one of the largest cars in the world. It had a total production run of seven vehicles.

Ettore Bugatti planned to build twenty-five of these cars and sell them to royalty as the most luxurious car ever, but the Great Depression undermined his effort: only three of the seven made were sold; six still exist, with one wrecked in a crash. Unused engines were installed in newly constructed high-speed railcars for the French National Railway (SNCF).

== Design ==
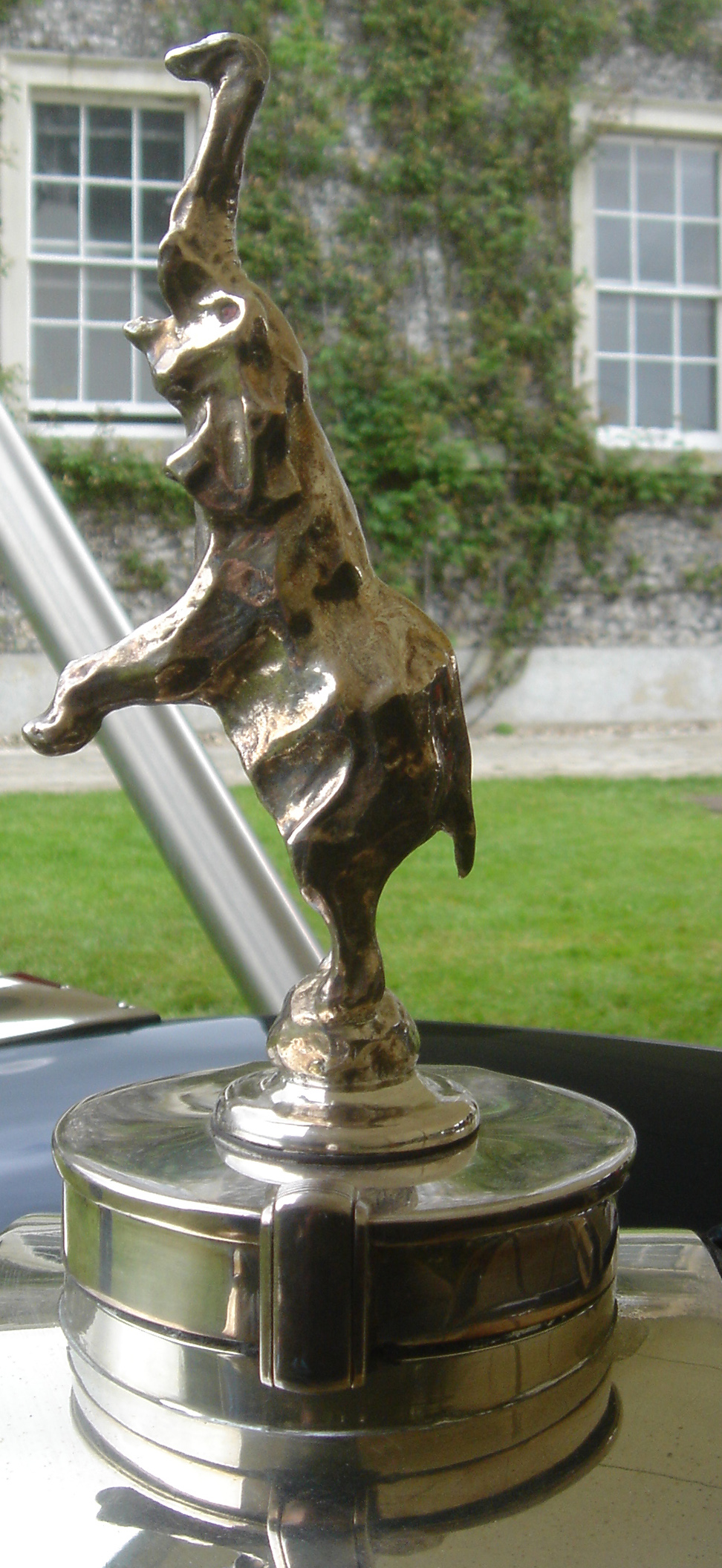
Type 41 radiator cap with elephant mascotte

The Type 41 is said to have come about because Alsatian autobuilder Ettore Bugatti took exception to the comments of an English lady who compared his cars unfavourably with those of Rolls-Royce.

=== Engine ===
The overhead cam straight 8 engine was based on an aero design that had been done for the French Air Ministry, but never produced. Its huge iron block was cast in one unit with an integrated cylinder head. At approx. 1.4 m (4.6 ft) long x 1.1 m (3.6 ft) high, it is physically one of the largest engines ever made for a passenger automobile; it also had one of the largest displacements,12.7 L (775 cu in), with each cylinder displacing more than the entire engine of the contemporary Type 40 touring car.

It had a bore of 125 mm (4.9 in) and stroke of 130 mm (5.1 in), 3 valves per cylinder (two inlet:one exhaust) driven by a centrally positioned single overhead camshaft. Only three bearings and only a single custom carburettor was used. Output was 205–224 kW (275–300 hp) at 1800 rpm, and 875 lb⋅ft (1,186 N⋅m) of torque.

Grinding of the engine valves was a regular maintenance requirement, and removing them required removing and disassembling the large monobloc engine.

=== Chassis ===
The chassis featured a conventional semi-elliptic leaf spring suspension in front, and both forward and rear-facing Bugatti quarter-elliptic springs in the rear.

In order to reduce noise an aluminium clutch box was attached to the chassis rather than the engine; and the aluminium gearbox was placed in the rear as a transaxle to offset the weight of the engine.

Massive manual brakes were mechanically operated via cable controls, effective but requiring significant leg strength. The car's light alloy "Roue Royale" wheels measured 610 millimetres (24 in) in diameter, and were cast in one piece with the brake drums.

=== Controls ===
Dashboard controls were made of whalebone, and the steering wheel was covered in walnut.

=== Body ===
All Royales were individually bodied. The radiator cap was a posed elephant, a sculpture by Ettore's brother Rembrandt Bugatti.

=== Performance ===
A road test performed in 1926 by W. F. Bradley at the request of Ettore Bugatti for the Autocar demonstrated balanced handling at speed, similar to smaller Bugatti sports cars, despite the car's weight and size.

== Production ==
In 1928, Ettore Bugatti asserted that "this year King Alfonso of Spain will receive his Royale", but the Spanish king was deposed in April 1931 without taking delivery of a Royale, and the first of the cars to find a customer was not delivered until 1932. The Royale with a basic chassis price of $30,000, was launched just as the world economy began to deteriorate into the 1930s Great Depression. Six Royales were built between 1929 and 1933, with just three sold to external customers. Intended for royalty, none was eventually sold to any royals, and Bugatti even refused to sell one to King Zog of Albania, claiming that "the man's table manners are beyond belief!"

Six of seven production Royales still exist, as the prototype was destroyed in an accident in 1931, and each has a different body, some having been rebodied several times.

=== 41100 - Coupé Napoleon ===
- The first car is chassis number 41100, now known as the Coupé Napoleon.
- It originally had a Packard body. It was rebodied by Parisian coach builder Weymann as a two-door fixed head coupe. The Weymann body was replaced after the car was crashed by Ettore Bugatti, who in 1930 or 1931 fell asleep at the wheel travelling home from Paris to Alsace, necessitating a major rebuild.
- Bricked up with 41141 and 41150 during World War II at the home of the Bugatti family in Ermenonville, to avoid being commandeered by the Nazis.
- It remained in the family's possession, housed at their Ermenonville chateau, until financial difficulties forced its sale in 1963. It subsequently passed from L'Ebe Bugatti into the hands of Bugatti collector Fritz Schlumpf.
- Resides in the Musée National de l'Automobile de Mulhouse, alongside 41131 that the Schlumpf brothers had acquired from John Shakespeare.
- The 2011 recreation claims to use the original chassis from this car, stating that a new chassis frame was used in the rebuild of 41100 after the crash.
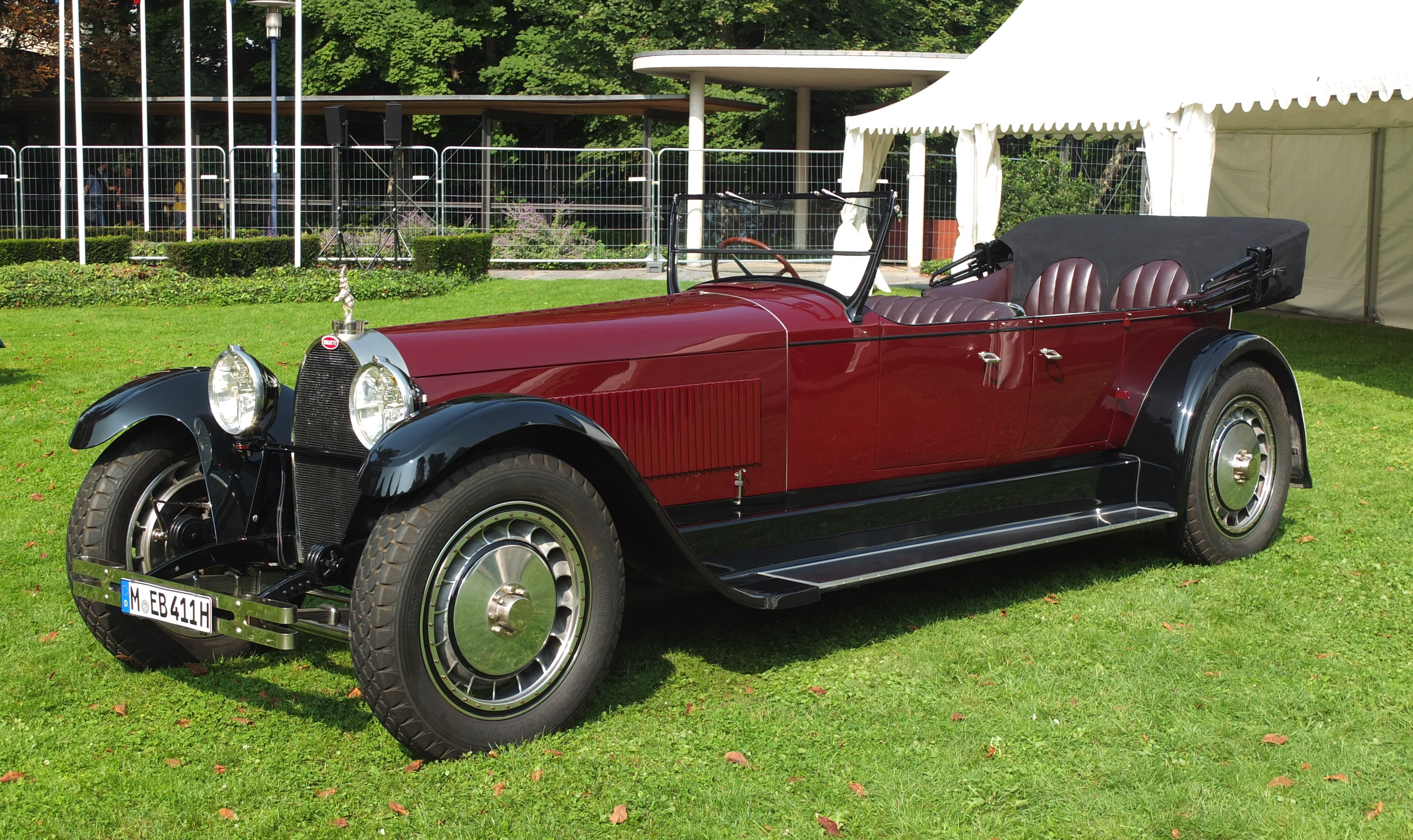
Recreation of the Bugatti Royale Packard Prototype

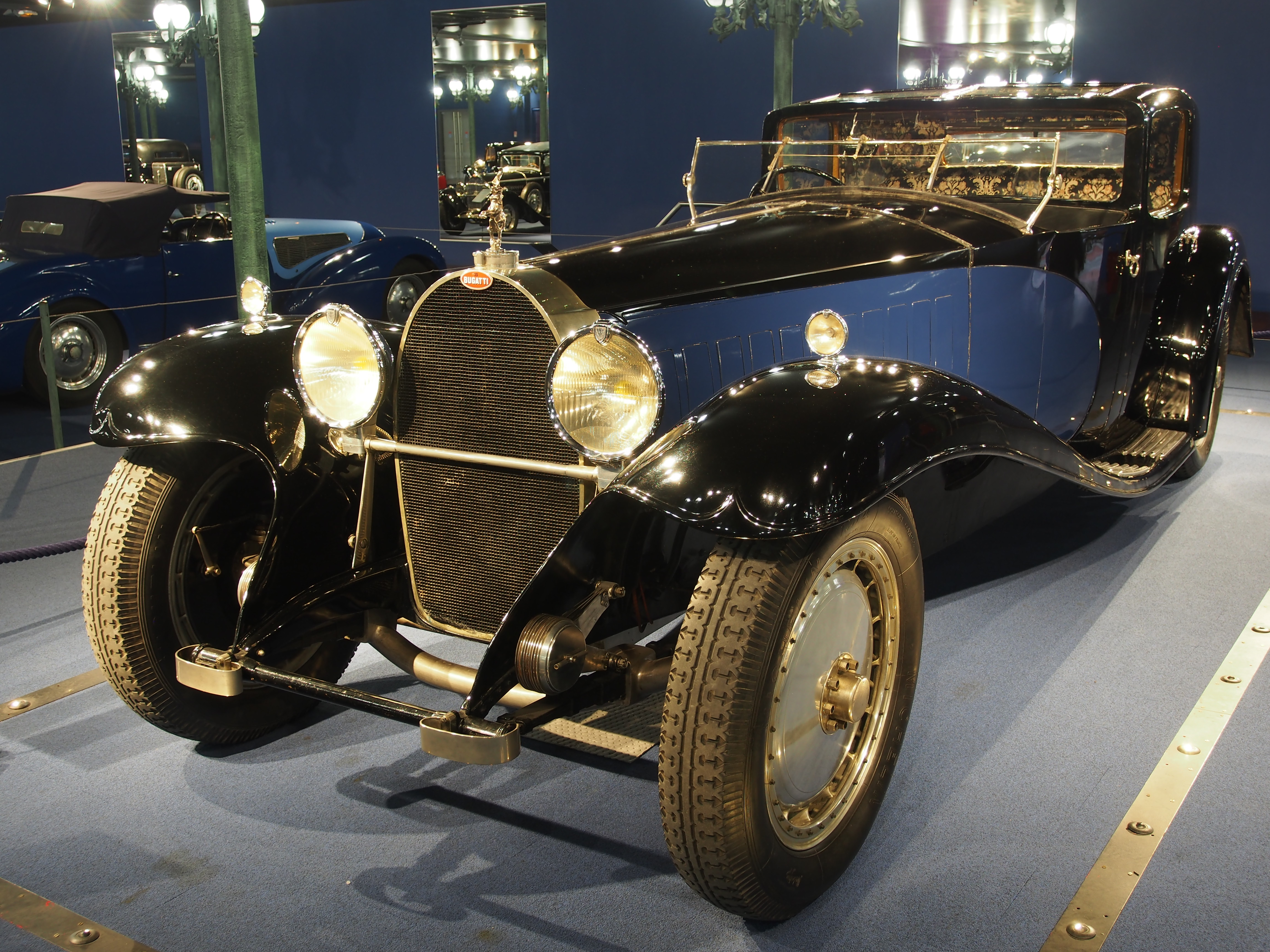
Chassis no.41100, known as the Coupé Napoleon, at home in the Musée National de l'Automobile de Mulhouse

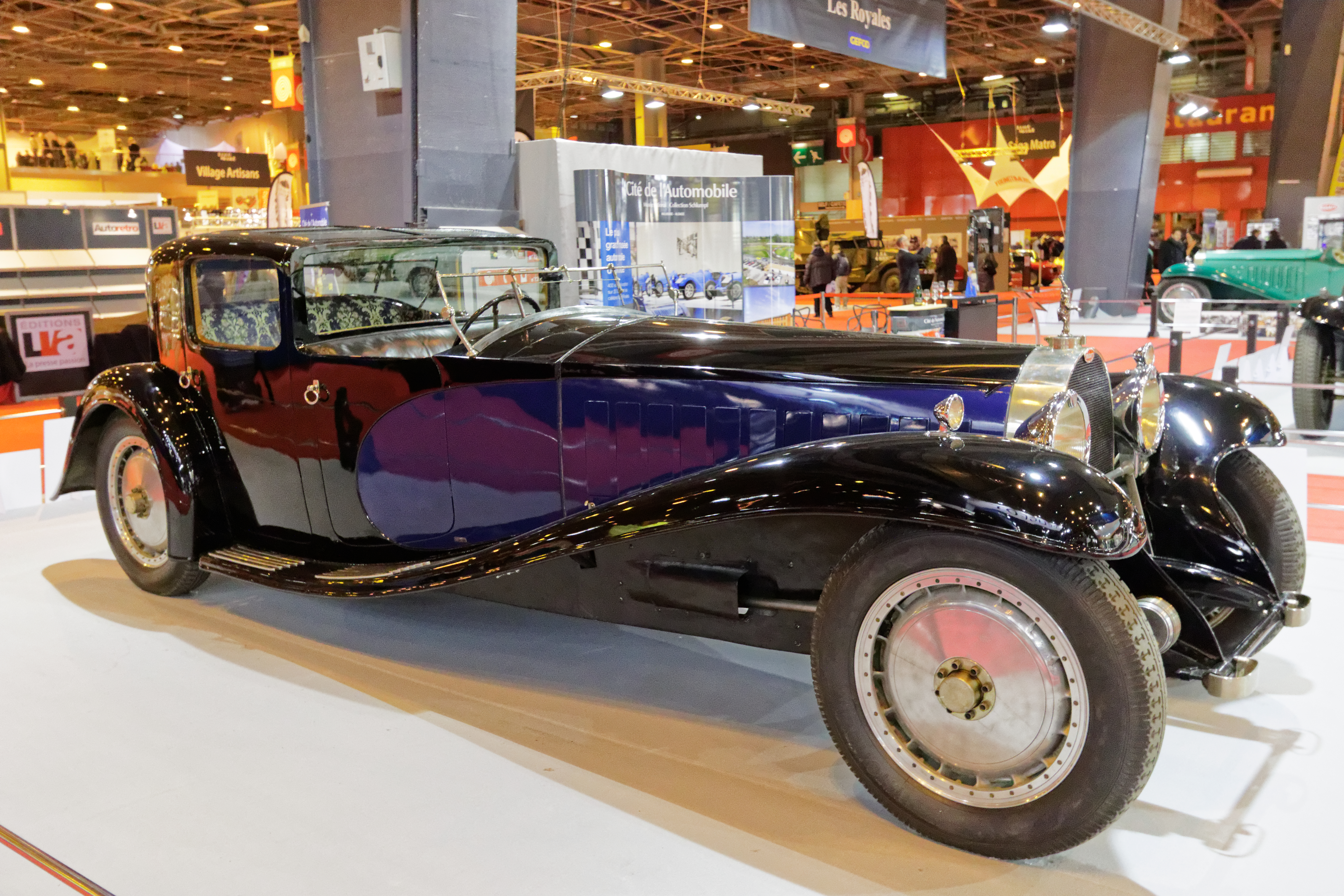

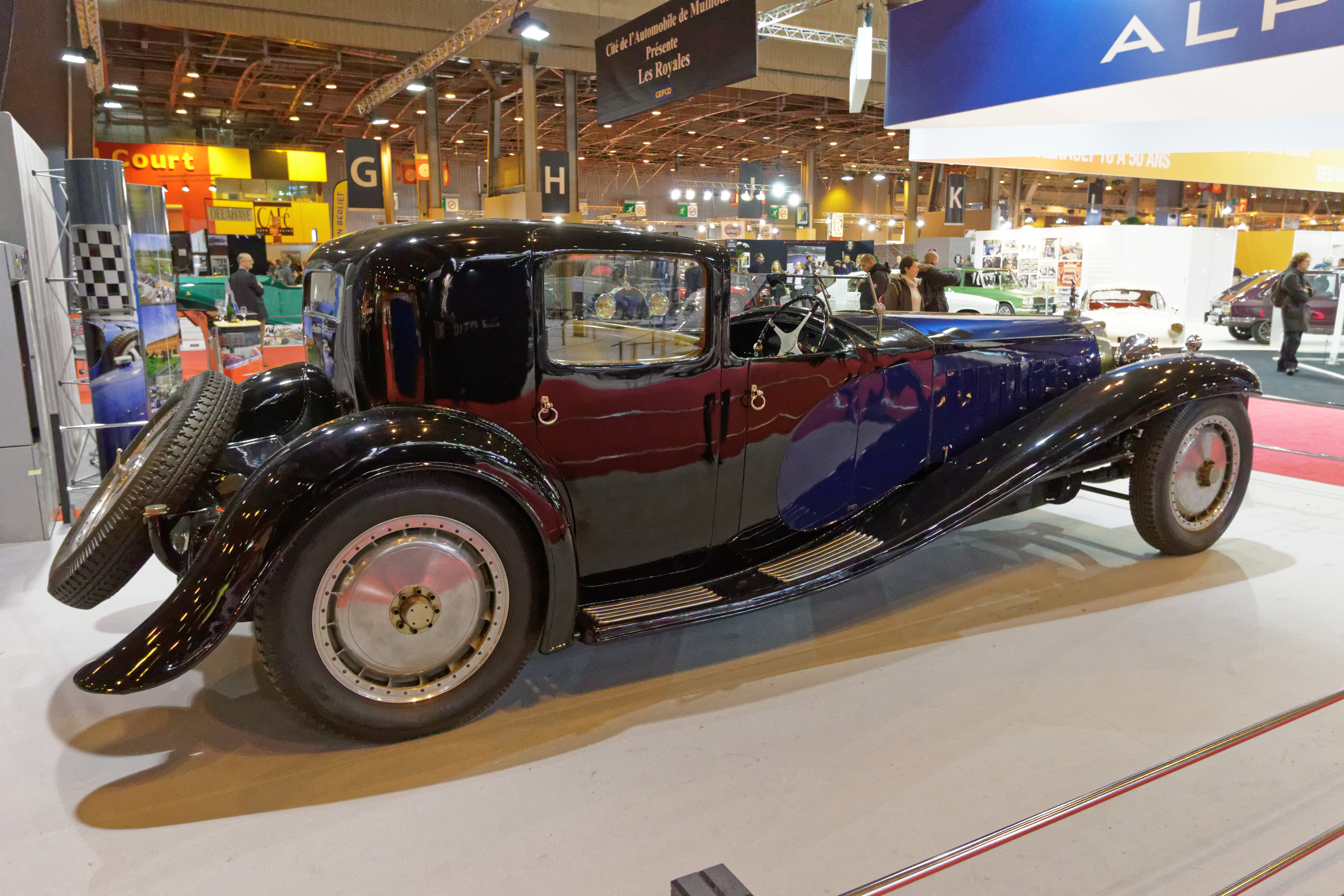

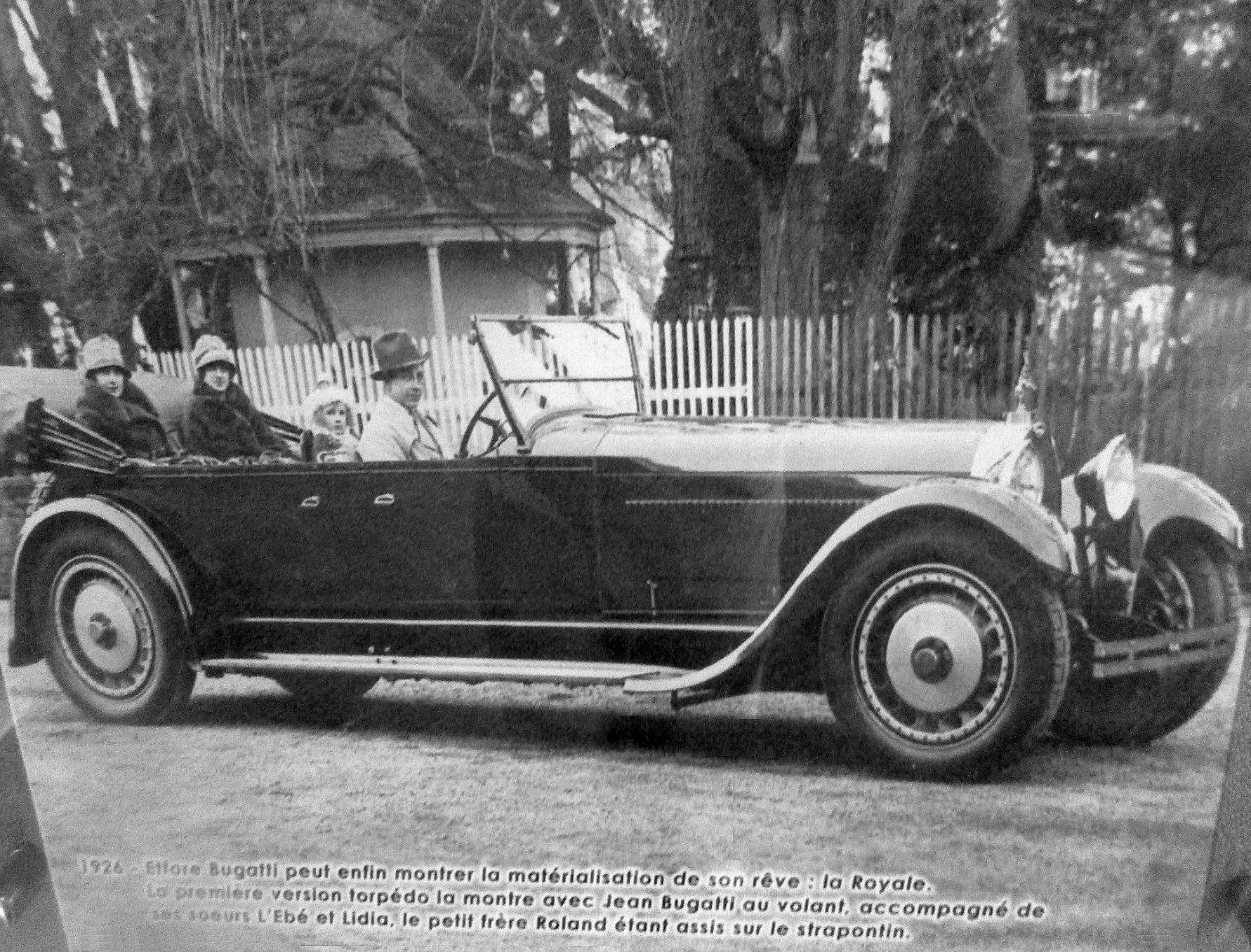
Bugatti Royale Type 41 Coupé Napoleon (Torpedo 1926)

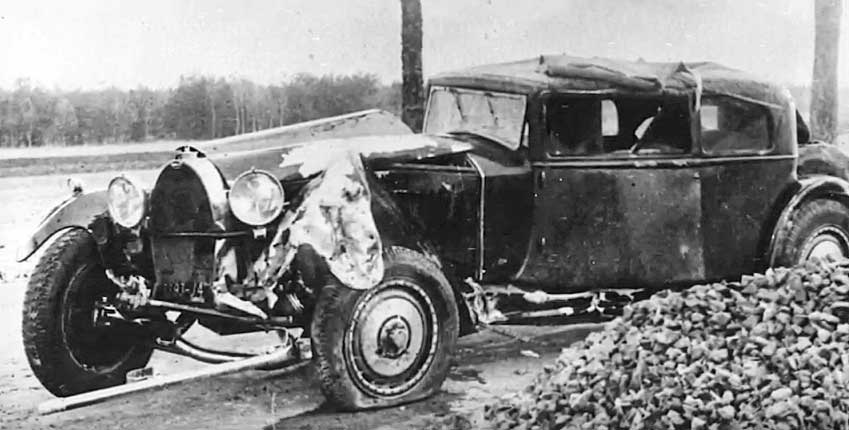
Crashed Bugatti type 41-100a body by Charles Weymann

=== 41111 - Coupé de ville Binder ===
- The second car built, but the first to find a customer, is chassis no.41111
- Known as the Coupé de ville Binder
- Sold in April 1932 to French clothing manufacturer Armand Esders. Ettore's eldest son, Jean, fashioned for the car a dramatic two-seater open body with flamboyant, full-bodied wings and a dickey seat, but no headlamps. In this form it became known as the Royale Esders Roadster.
- Purchased by the French politician Raymond Patenôtre, the car was rebodied in the Coupé de ville style by the coach builder Henri Binder. From this point onwards, known as the Coupé de ville Binder
- Never delivered to the King of Romania due to World War II, it was hidden from the Nazis by storing it in the sewers of Paris
- Briefly located in the United Kingdom after World War II, and was then acquired by Dudley C. Wilson of the US in 1954. On his death in 1961 it passed to banker Mills B. Lane of Atlanta.
- Sold in 1964 to The Harrah Collection at Reno, Nevada, bought at the then sensational price of $45,000 (approximately what the car had cost new).
- Sold in 1986 to an American collector, home builder, and US Air Force Reserve Major General William Lyon; he offered the car during the 1996 Barrett-Jackson Auction by private treaty sale, where he refused an offer of US$11 million; the reserve was set at US$15 million.
- Sold in 1999 to Volkswagen AG, the new owner of the Bugatti brand, for a reported US$20 million. Used as a brand promotion vehicle, it travels to various museums and locations.
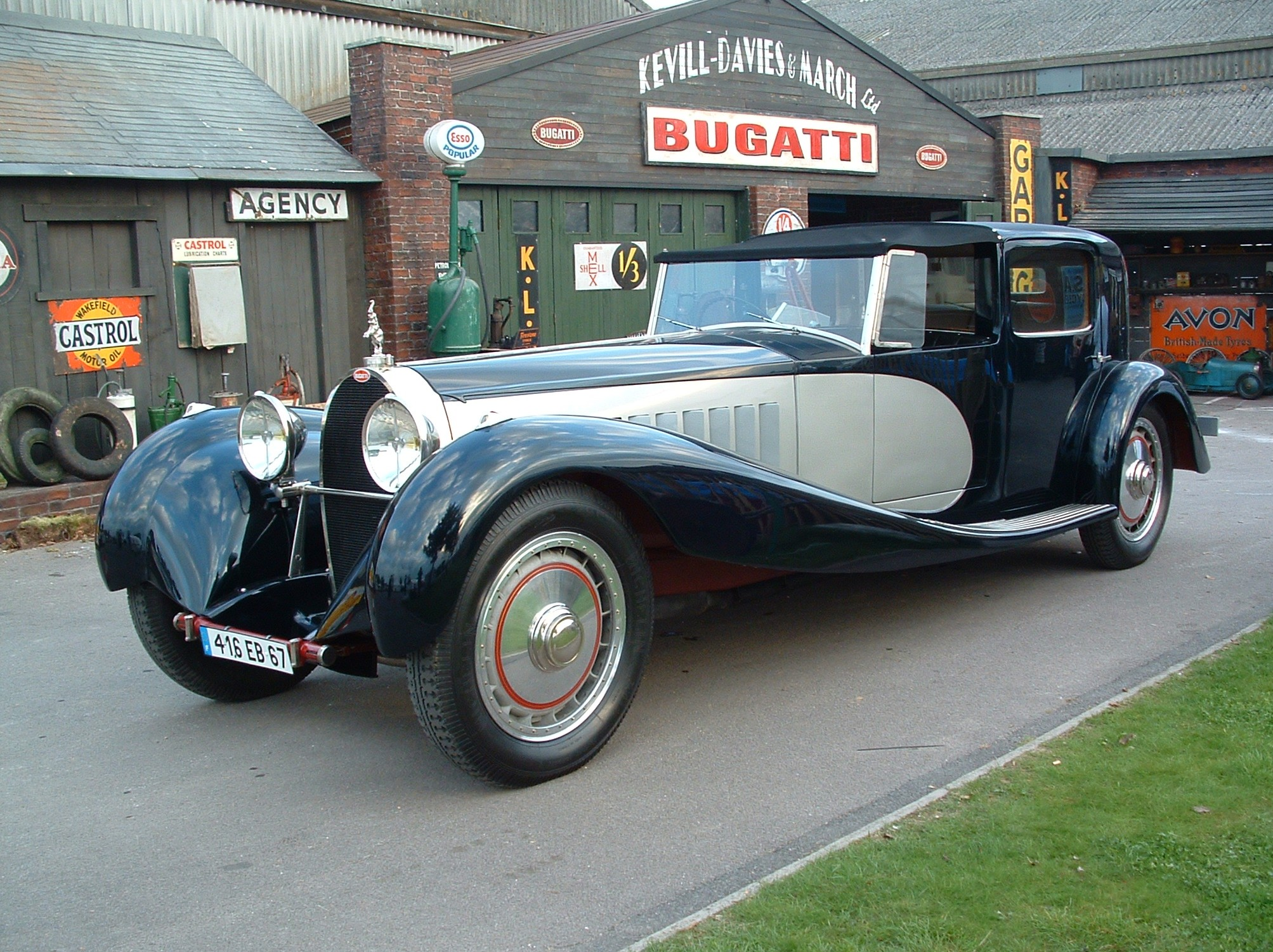
The Royale Coupe De Ville Binder 41111 at the 2004 Goodwood Revival

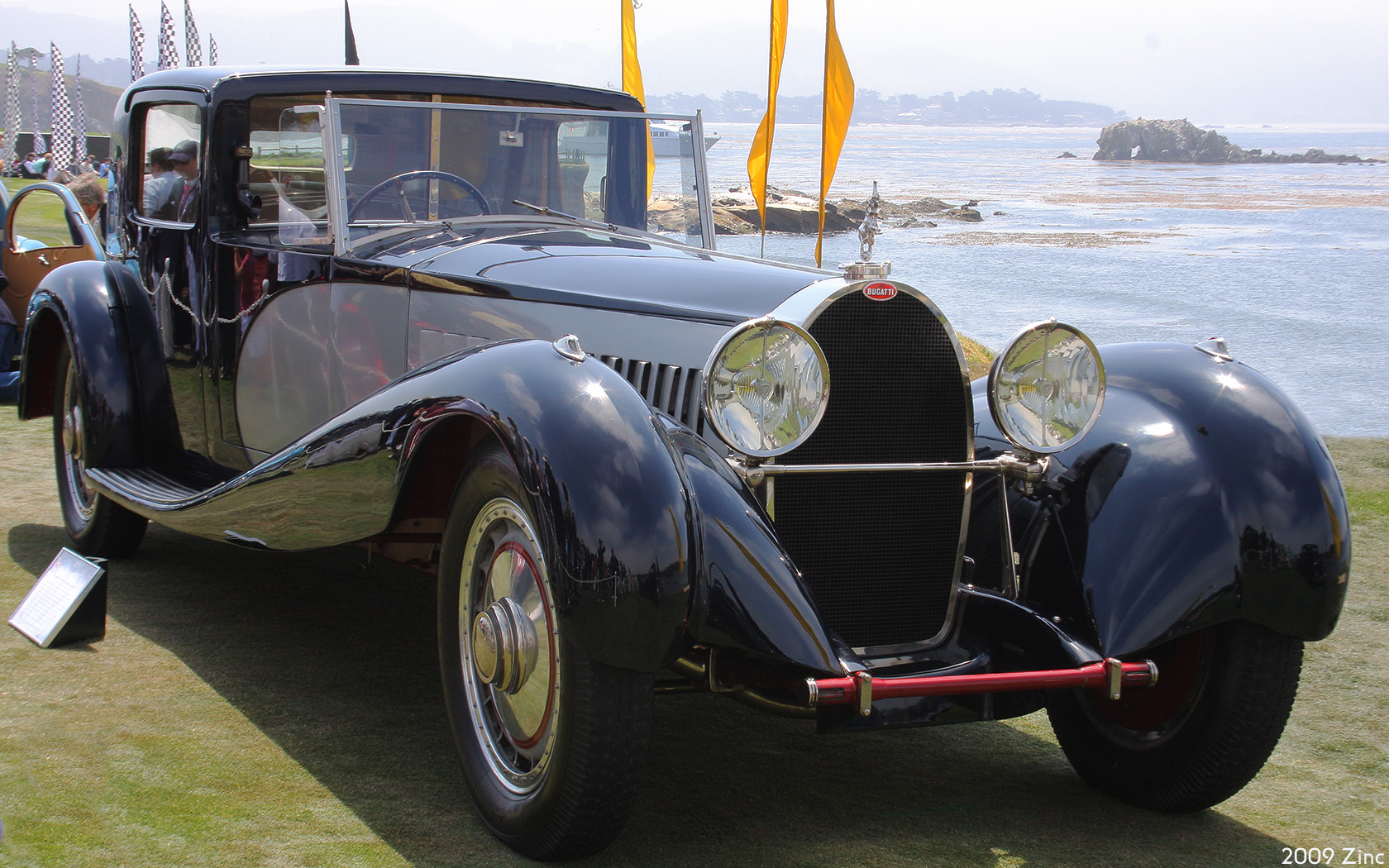
Bugatti Typ 41 "La Royale", Chassis #41-111 (1932), Coupé de Ville coachwork built by Henri Binder

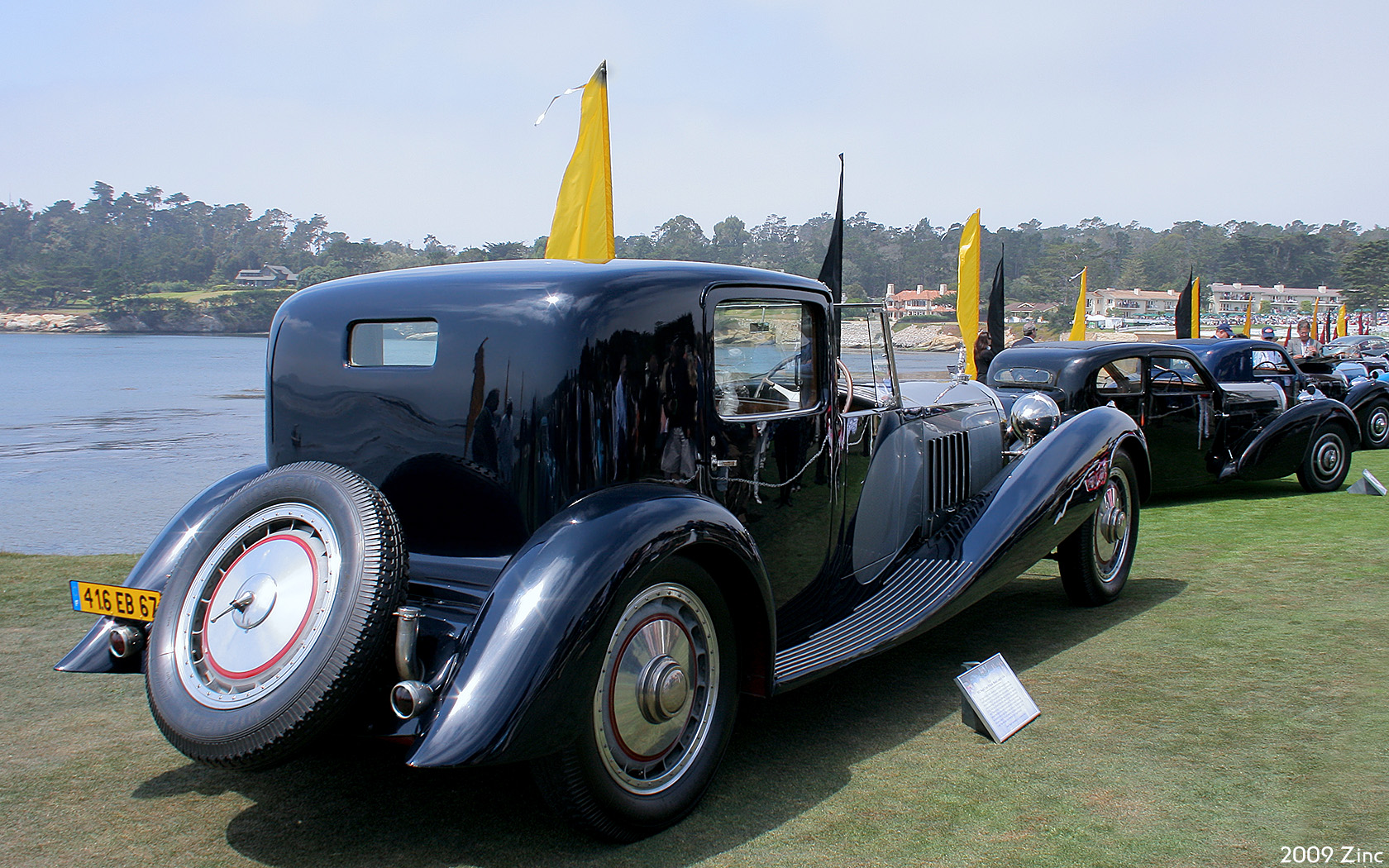
Bugatti Typ 41 "La Royale", Chassis #41-111 (1932), Coupé de Ville coachwork built by Henri Binder

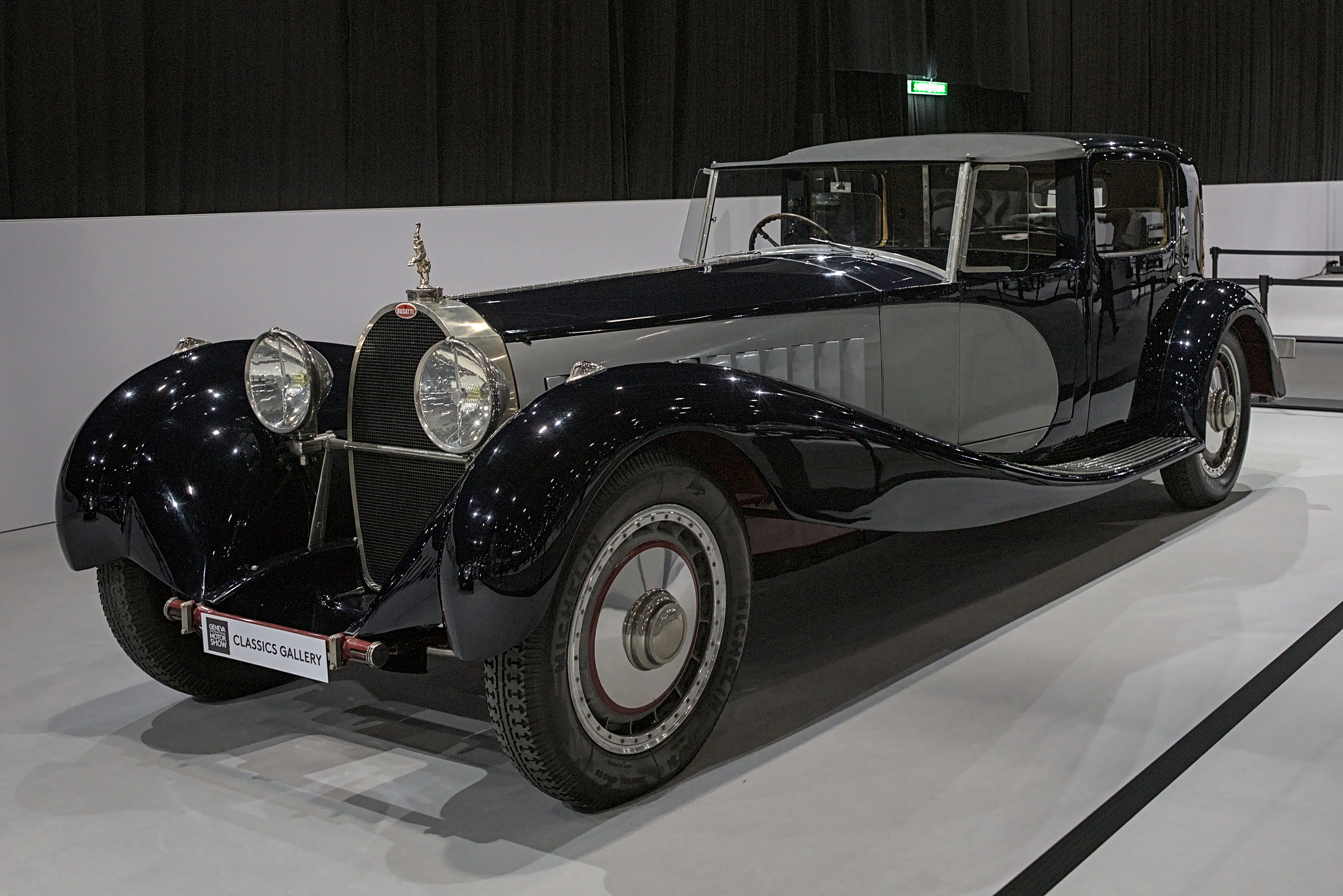
1930 Bugatti Type 41 Binder town car 1932-35 (chassis 41-111)

=== 41121 - Cabriolet Weinberger ===
- The third car is chassis no.41121
- Known as the Cabriolet Weinberger
- Sold in 1932 to German obstetrician Joseph Fuchs, who specified coach builder Ludwig Weinberger of Munich to build him an open cabriolet. Painted black with yellow, the car was delivered to Dr. Fuchs in May 1932.
- As political tensions rose in pre-war Germany, Fuchs relocated to Switzerland, then Shanghai, before permanently relocating to New York around 1937, bringing the Royale with him.
- Admired in Dr. Fuchs' ownership by Charles Chayne, later vice-president of Corporate Engineering at General Motors. Chayne later found the car in a scrap yard in New York, buying it in 1946 for US$75. Chayne would amass an impressive collection of classic cars in the 1940s and 1950s.
- Chayne got the car running, then modified it to perform better; he is said to have spent over US$10,000 through 1947, with the completed car featuring a new intake manifold with four carburetors instead of the original single unit; a new paint scheme of oyster white with a dark green trim; and a new convertible roof
- In 1957 Chayne donated the car to the Henry Ford Museum, in Dearborn, Michigan, US, where it is still located. The associated placard, in its entirety, reads: "1931 Bugatti Royale Type 41 Cabriolet, Ettore Bugatti, Molsheim, France, Body by Weinberger, OHC, in-line 8 cylinder, 300 horsepower, 779 cu.in. displacement, 7,035 lb (3,191 kg). Original price: $43,000, Gift of Charles and Esther Chayne."
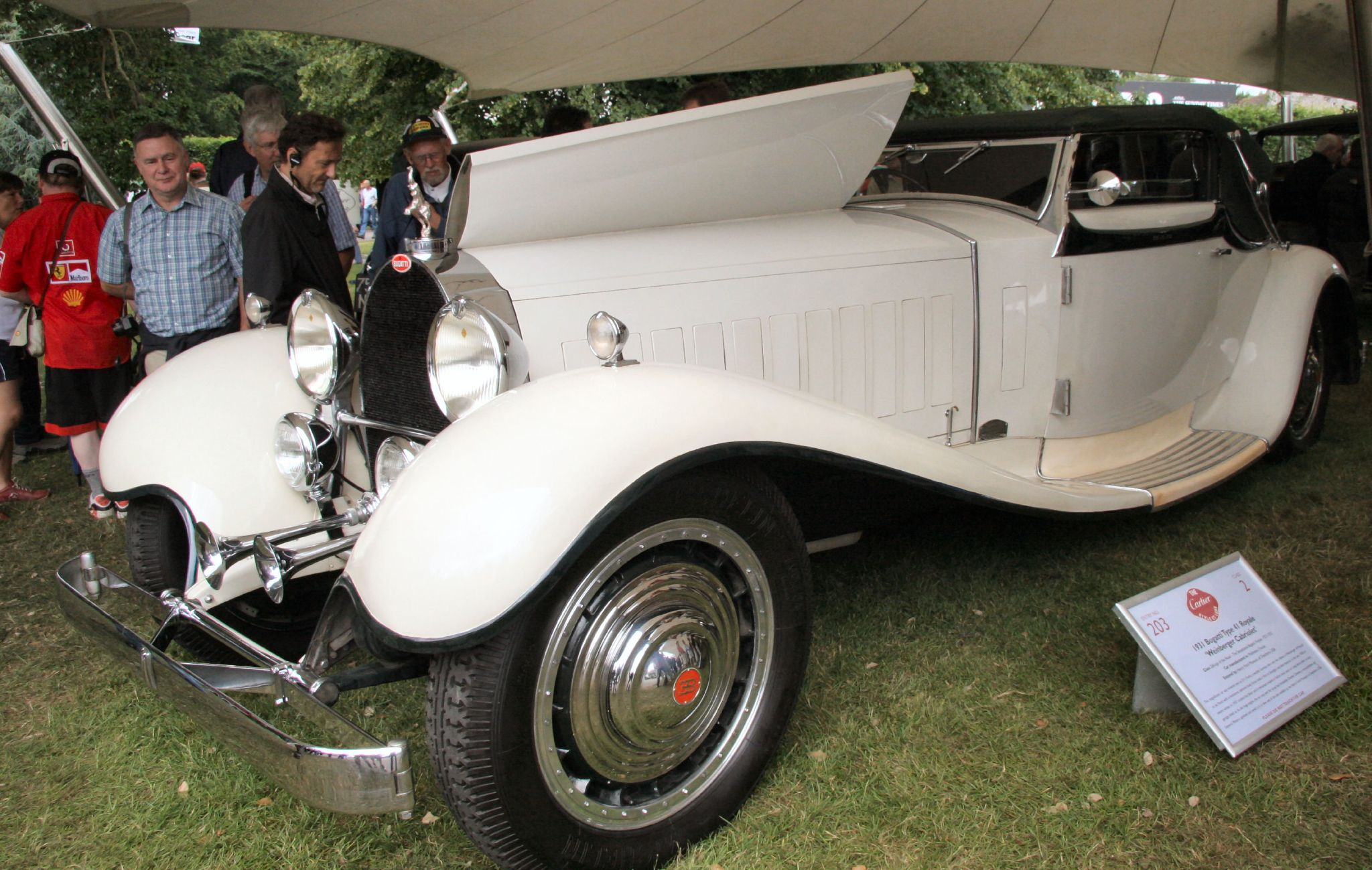
Chassis no.41121, Bugatti Type 41 Royale 'Weinberger Cabriolet' 1931

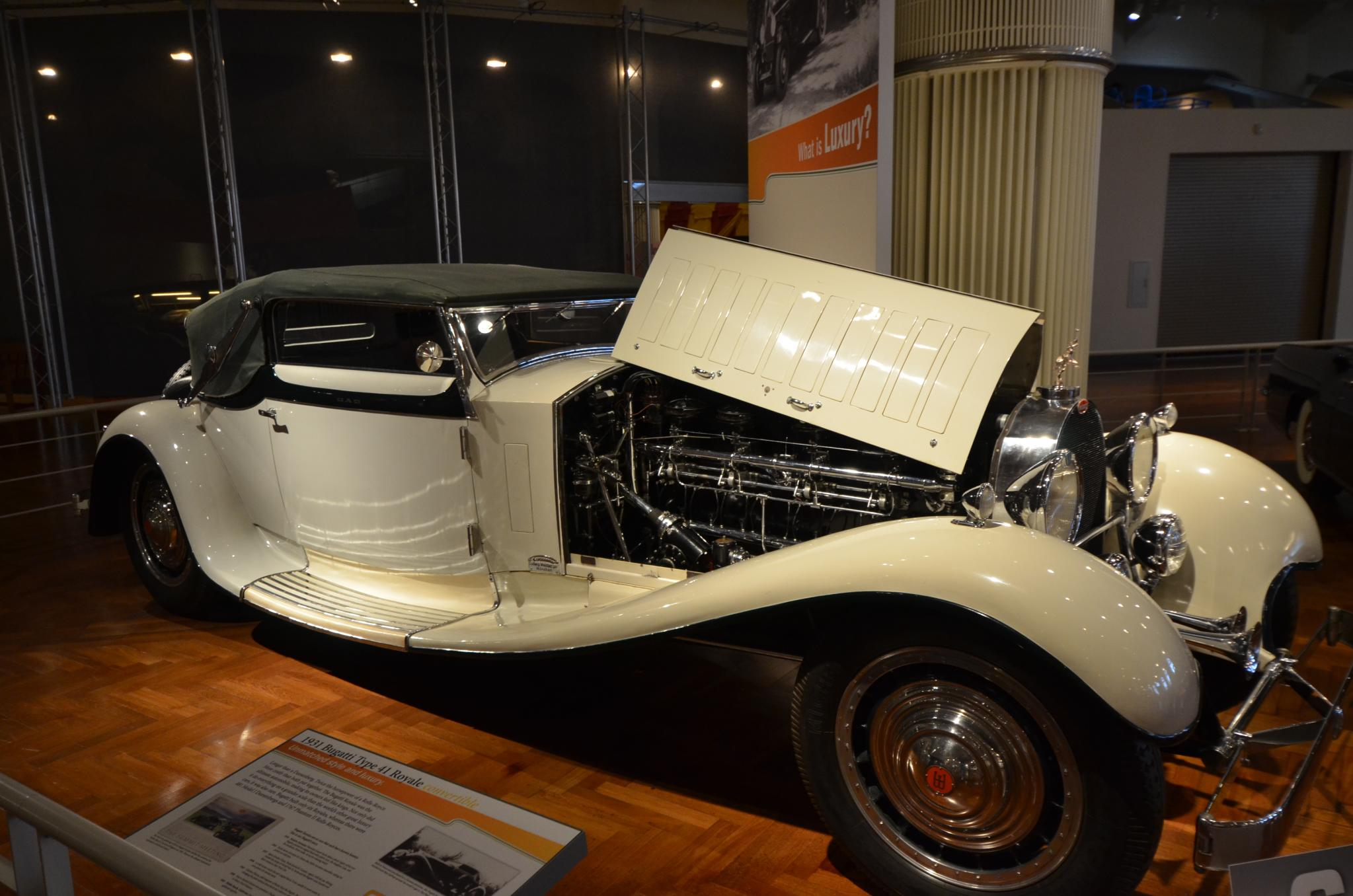
At the Henry Ford Museum in Dearborn, Michigan

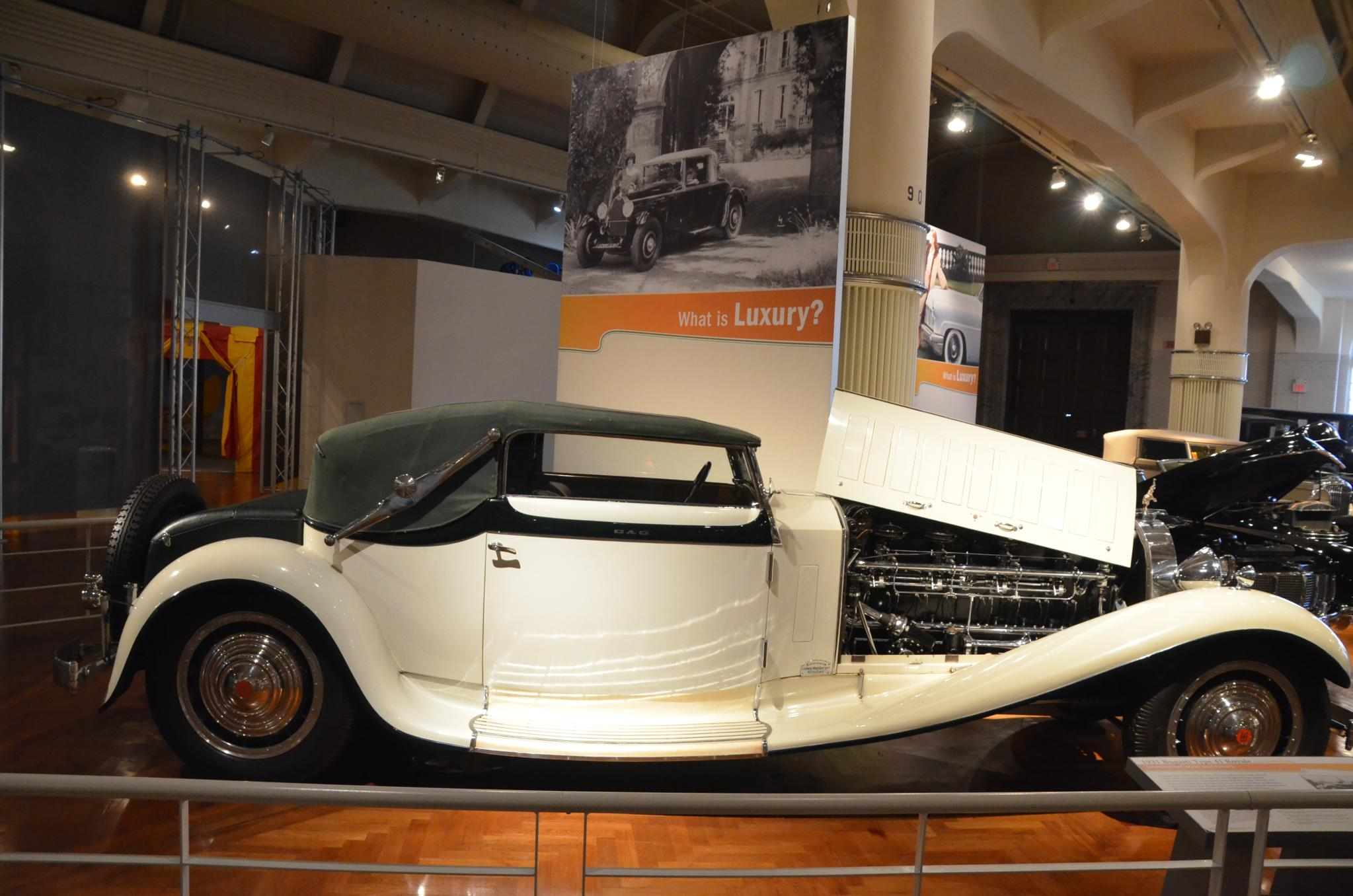

=== 41131 - Limousine Park-Ward ===
- The fourth car is chassis no.41131
- Known as the Foster car or Limousine Park-Ward
- Sold in 1933 to Englishman Captain Cuthbert W. Foster, heir through his American mother to Eben Jordan, founder of Jordan Marsh, a large Boston department store. Foster had a limousine body made for the car by Park Ward, created in the style of a 1921 Daimler he had once owned.
- Acquired in 1946 by British Bugatti dealer Jack Lemon Burton for around £700 (equivalent to £25,347 in 2025), who was forced to replace the huge tires with ones from an artillery piece, necessitating the need to remove the skirting from the fenders.
- Sold June/July 1956 to American Bugatti collector John Shakespeare, becoming part of the largest collection of Bugattis at that time. Shakespeare paid £3,500 (equivalent to £126,737 in 2025) for the car, which was in mint condition. This was a substantial price for a collector car in 1956. Two show-condition Duesenberg SJs could be bought at the same price that year. Brand new Ferraris started around this price in 1956 as well.
- Facing financial problems, in 1963 Shakespeare sold his car collection to Fritz Schlumpf for $85,000 (equivalent to $882,377 in 2025).
- Part of the Schlumpf Collection
- Resides in the Musée National de l'Automobile de Mulhouse, alongside 41100 that the brothers Schlumpf had acquired from the Bugatti estate.
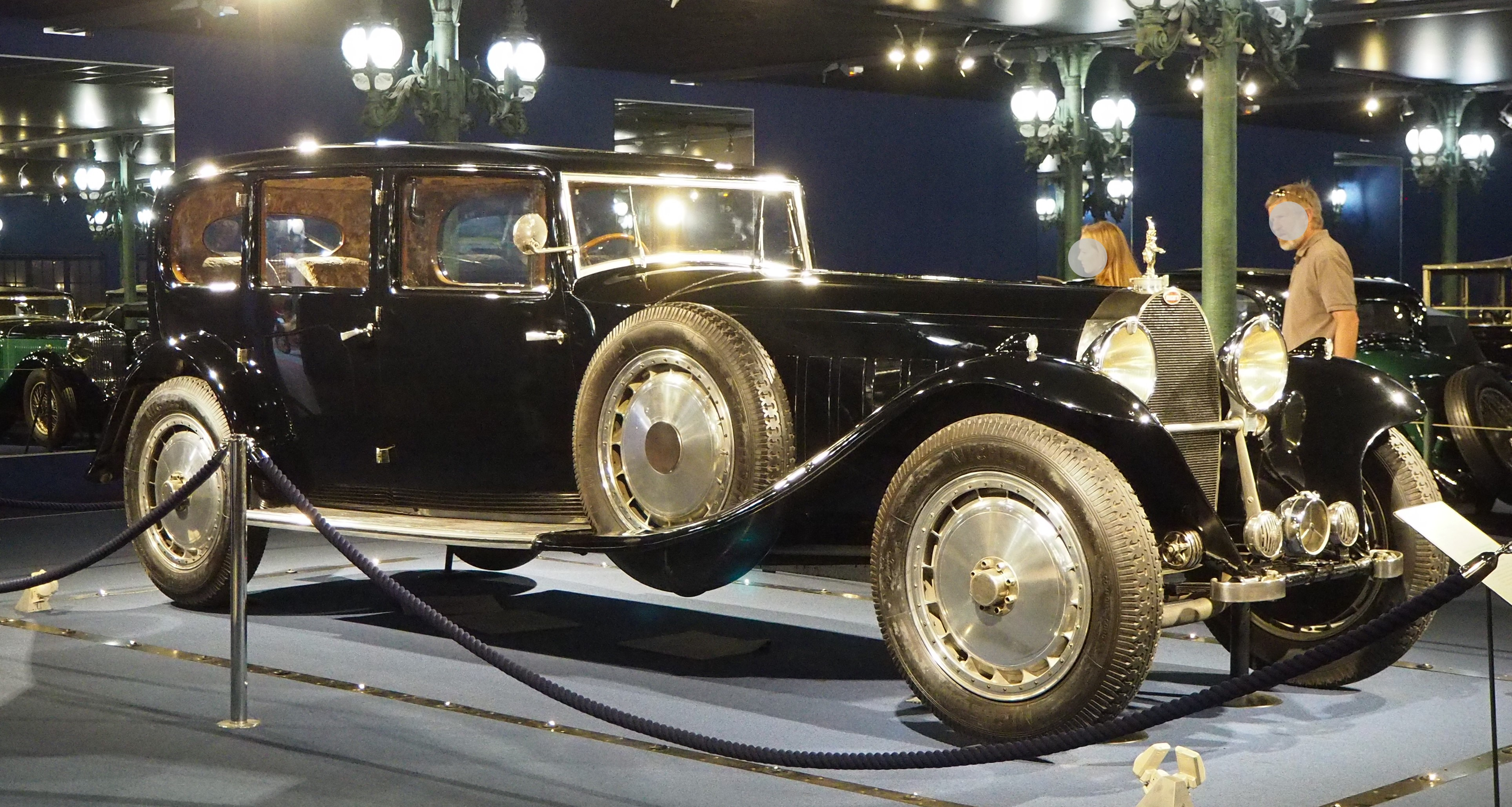
Chassis no.41131, known as the Limousine Park-Ward, at home in the Musée National de l'Automobile de Mulhouse

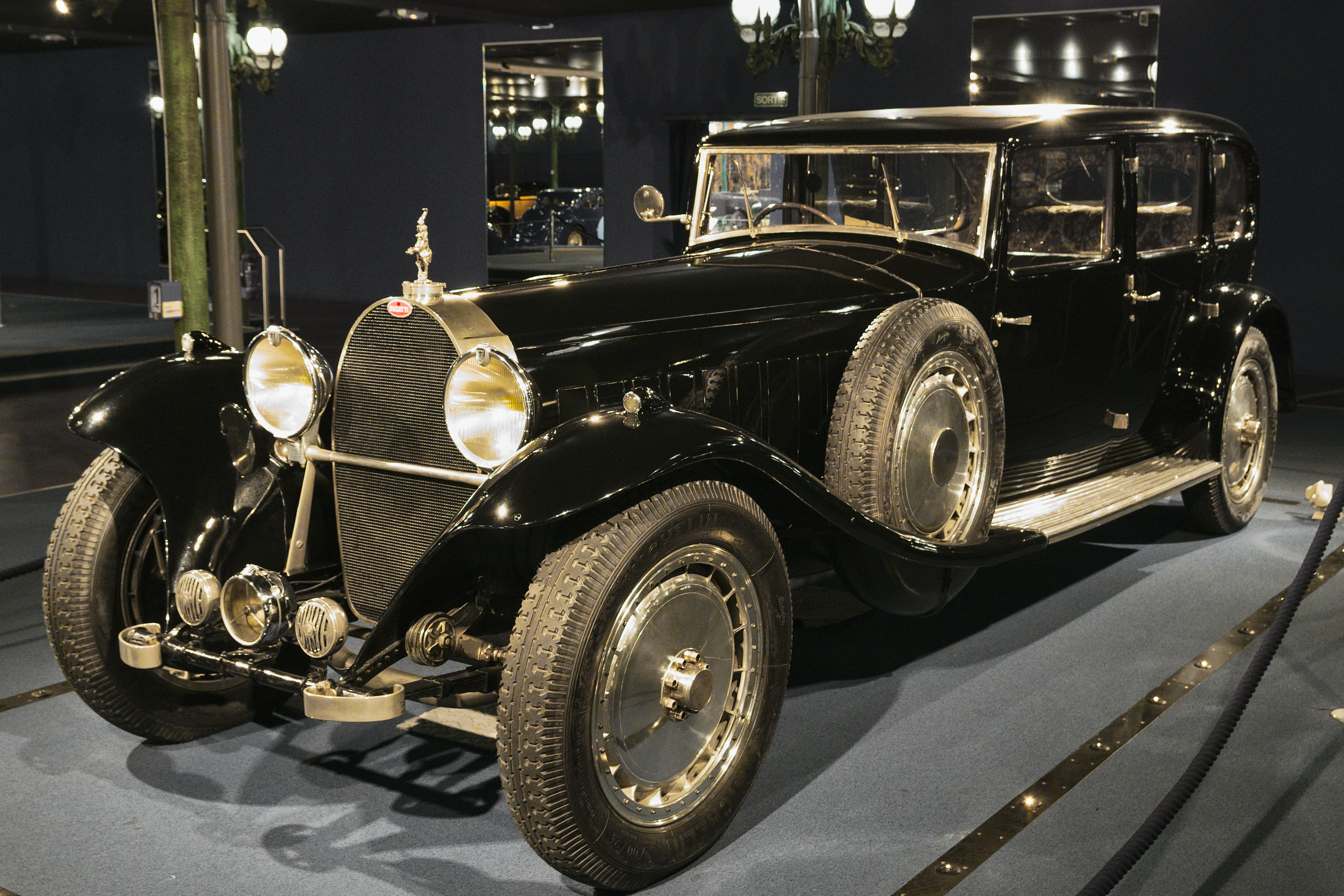
Chassis no.41131, known as the Limousine Park-Ward

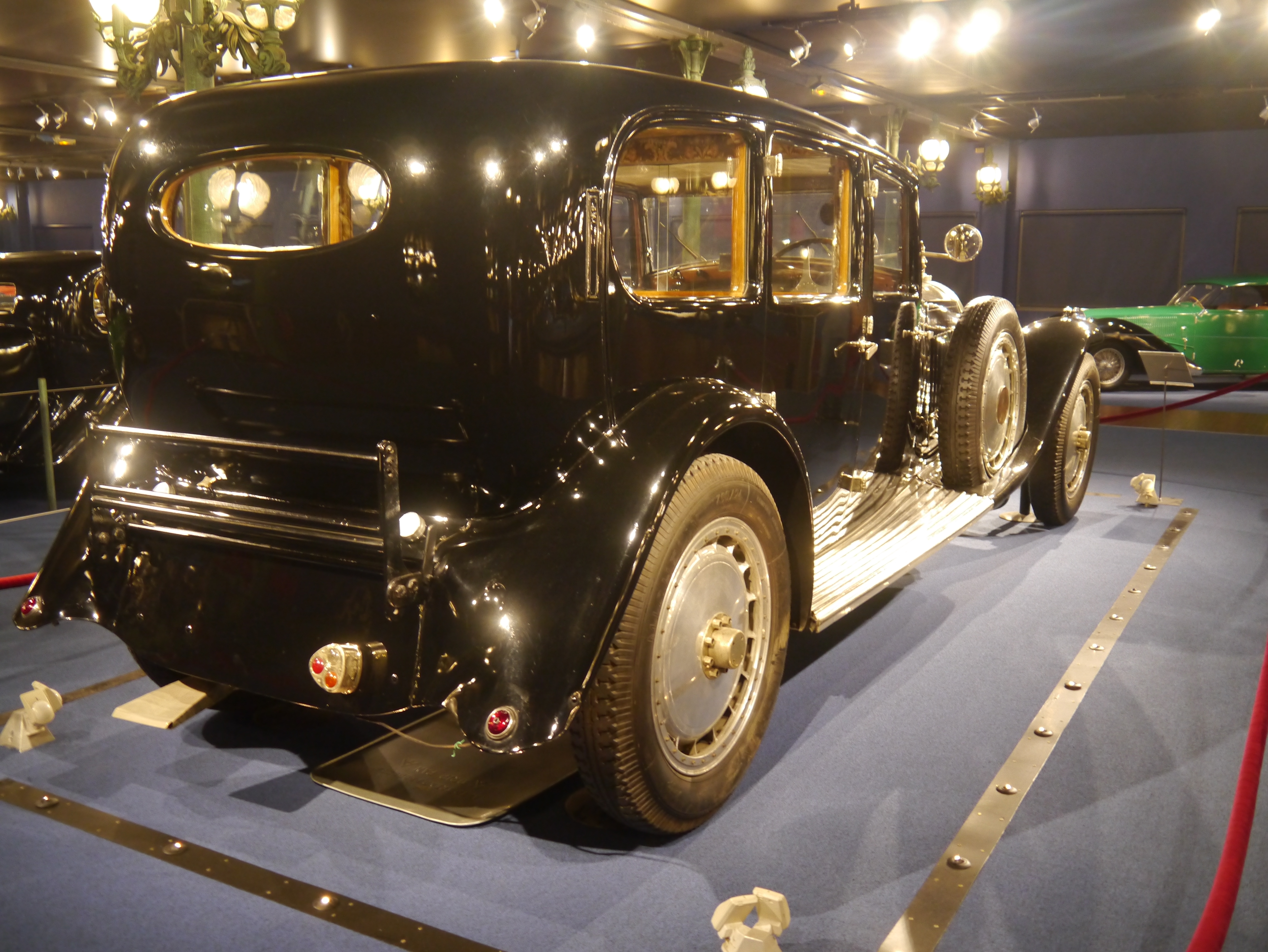

=== 41141 - Kellner car ===
- The fifth car is chassis no.41141
- Known as the Kellner car
- Unsold, it was kept by Bugatti
- Bricked up with 41100 and 41150 during World War II at the home of the Bugatti family in Ermenonville, to avoid being commandeered by the Nazis.
- Sold together with 41150 by L'Ebe Bugatti in the Summer of 1950 to American Le Mans racer Briggs Cunningham, in return for FR₣200000 (US$571), plus a pair of complimentary new General Electric refrigerators, then unavailable in post-war France. Note that the French franc had been drastically devalued in the years immediately following the war. The refrigerators were included out of gratuity. The car was rough but drive-able. Taking the refrigerators into account, he essentially paid about US$600 per car. Restoration costs would bring the total cost up to about 1 million Francs, or US$2,858, per car. The cars were delivered to the States in January 1951.
- After closing his museum in 1986, in 1987 the car was sold direct from Briggs Cunningham's collection by Christie's for £5.5 million or US$9.7 million at the Royal Albert Hall, to Swedish property tycoon Hans Thulin.
- The car was also offered for auction in 1989 by Kruse in Las Vegas, US. Ed Weaver bid to US$11.5 million, which was declined by Thulin as the reserve was US$15 million. On collapse of his empire, Thulin sold the car in 1990 for a reported $15.7 million to Japanese conglomerate the Meitec Corporation, and it resided in their modern building basement before being offered for sale for £10million by Bonhams & Brooks by private treaty in 2001.
- Ownership is presently unknown, but it has been shown in recent years by Swiss broker Lukas Huni.

=== 41150 - Berline de Voyage ===
- The sixth car is chassis no. 41150
- Known as the Berline de Voyage

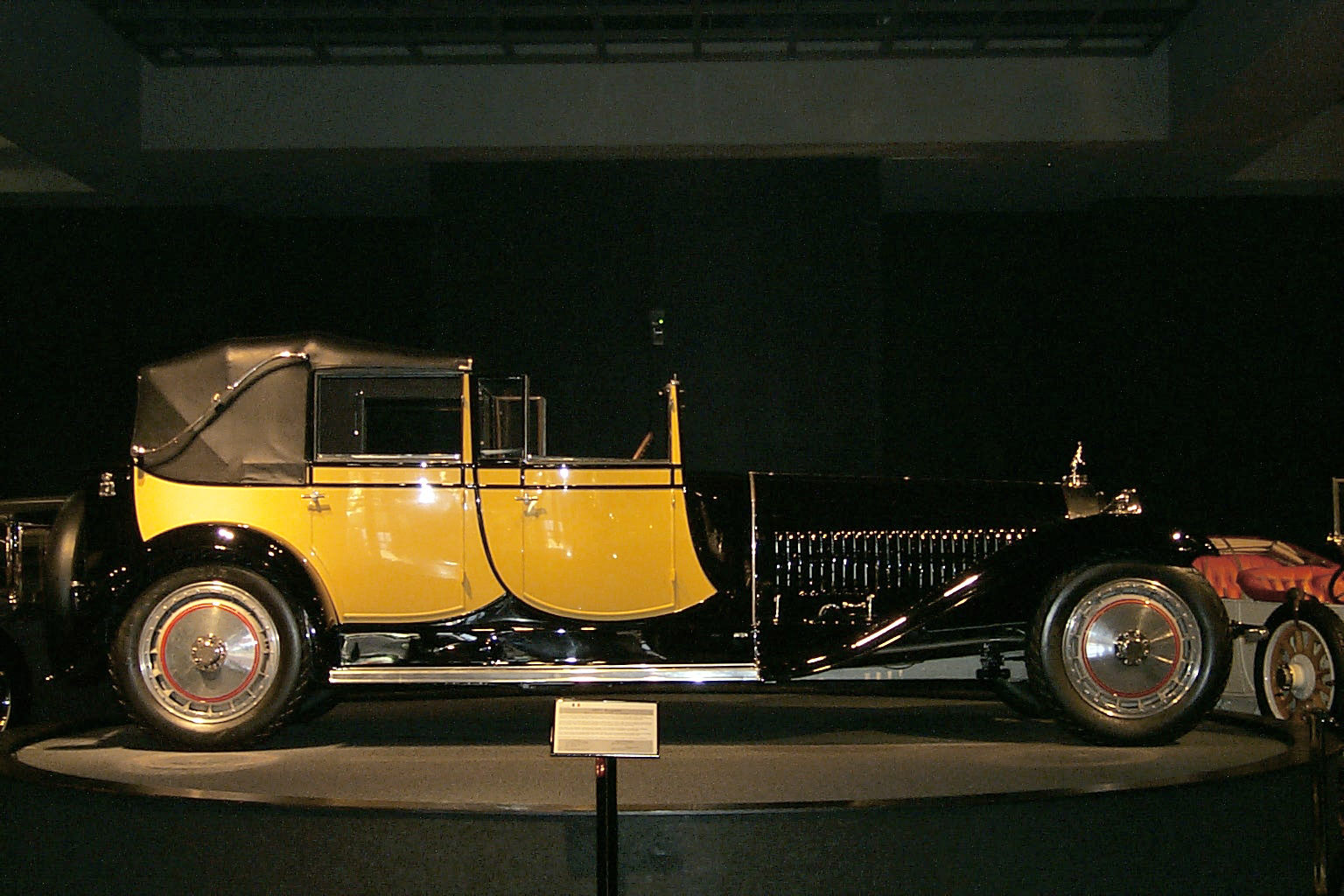
Chassis no.41150, Bugatti Type 41 Royale Berline de Voyage 1929

- Unsold, it was kept by Bugatti
- Bricked up with 41100 and 41141 during World War II at the home of the Bugatti family in Ermenonville, to avoid being commandeered by the Nazis.
- Sold together with 41141 by L'Ebe Bugatti in the Summer of 1950 to American Le Mans racer Briggs Cunningham, in return for FR₣200,000 (US$571), plus a pair of complimentary new General Electric refrigerators, then unavailable in post-war France. Bear in mind that the French franc had been drastically devalued in the years immediately following the war. The refrigerators were included out of gratuity. The car was rough but drive-able. Taking the refrigerators into account, he essentially paid about $600 per car. Restoration costs would bring the total cost up to about 1 million Francs, or US$2,858, per car. The cars were delivered to the US in January 1951.
- On their arrival in the United States, Cunningham sold 41150, first to Cameron Peck in early 1952 for about $6,500 (at the time one of the highest prices ever paid for a collector car, landing Cunningham a substantial profit).
- In 1991, Tom Monaghan, founder of Domino's Pizza, sold 41150 for US$8,000,000, which was actually less than the £5.7 million for which he purchased it in 1987 from Jerry J. Moore.
- The car was sold to the Blackhawk Collection in Danville, California, where it has been on display at various times.
- It was later sold by the Blackhawk Museum to an 'unknown buyer', incorrectly attributed to either Volkswagen or a Korean investor.

=== French National Railway SNCF ===
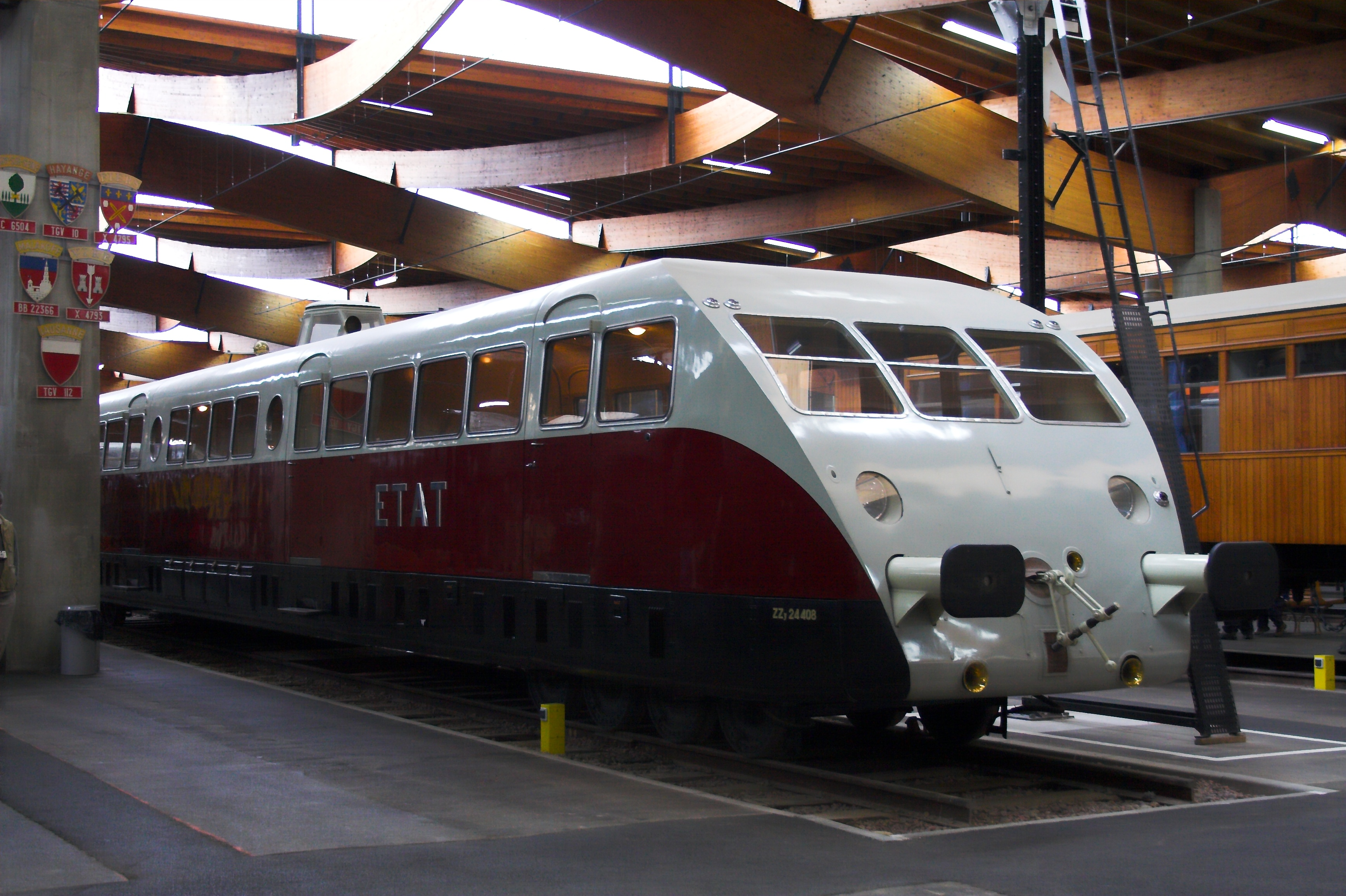
Most of the engines intended for the Royale were derated and found their way into a series of high-speed Bugatti railcars.

To utilize the remaining 23 engines after the final Royale was built, Bugatti built a railcar powered by either two or four of the eight-cylinder units. Seventy-nine were built for the French National Railway SNCF, using a further 186 engines, the last of them remaining in regular use until 1956 or 1958 (sources differ). The railcar turned the Royale project from an economic failure into a commercial success for Bugatti. The engines were derated to produce only about 200 hp, but even in this form they provided excellent performance. One of the railcars took a world average speed record of 122 mph (196 km/h) for 43.9 miles (70.7 km).

Media related to Bugatti railcar at Wikimedia Commons

== Technical data ==
| | Type 41 |
|---|---|
| Engine: | Front mounted 8-cylinder in-line engine |
| Displacement: | 12,763 cc (779 cu in) |
| Bore x stroke: | 125 x 130 mm |
| Max power at rpm: | 300 hp at 1800 rpm |
| Valve control: | 1 overhead cam shaft, 3 valves per cylinder, SOHC |
| Compression: |
| Carburetor: | 1 Bugatti carburettor |
| Induction: | Naturally aspirated |
| Gearbox: | 3-speed manual |
| Suspension front: | Live axle, semi-elliptic leaf springs, friction dampers |
| Suspension rear: | Live axle, quarter elliptic leaf springs, friction dampers |
| Brakes: | Cable operated drums |
| Chassis & body: | Body on ladder frame |
| Wheelbase: | 430 cm (169 in) |
| Dry weight: | 3175 kg |
| Top speed: | 201 km/h (125 mph) |

== Extended production ==
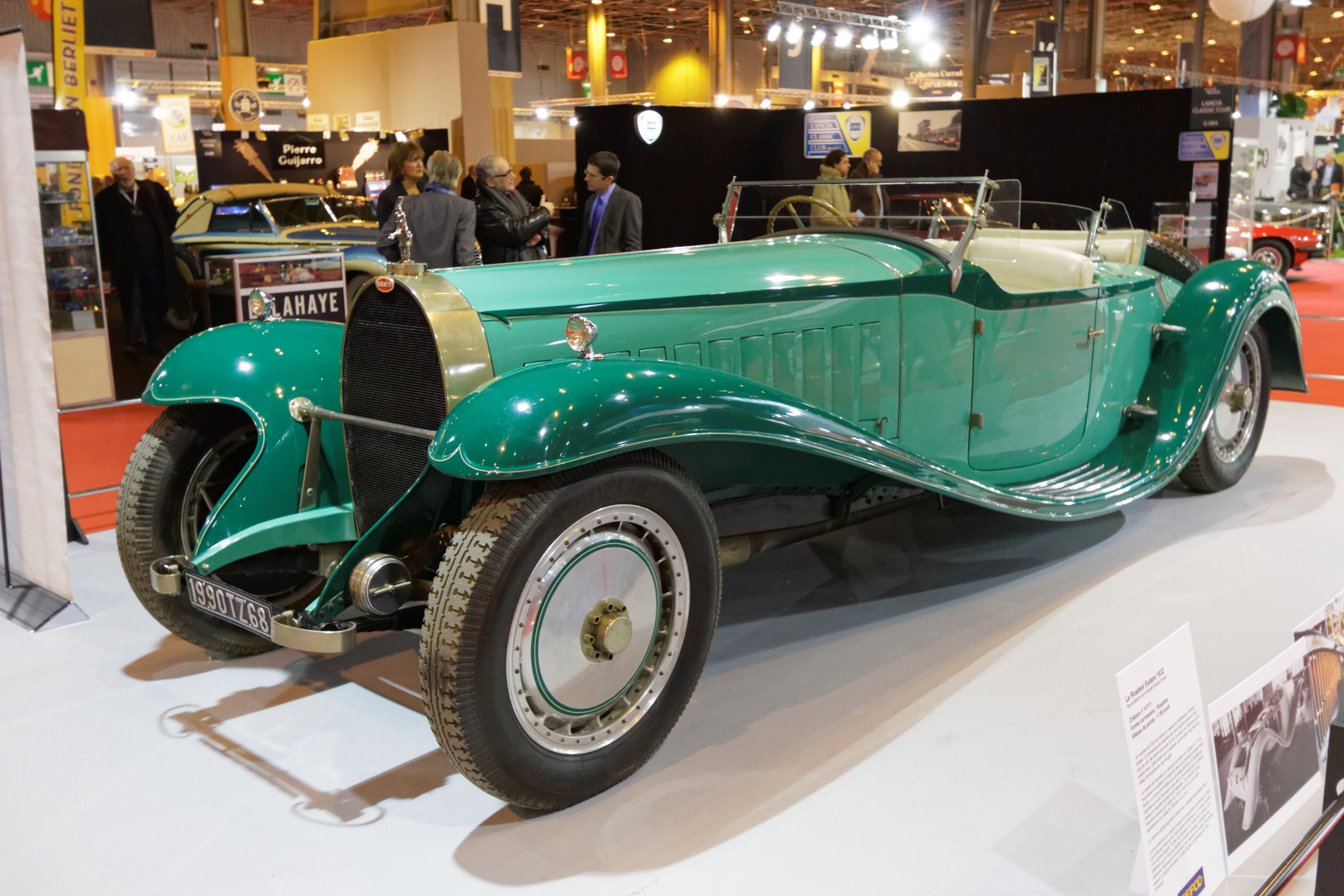
The brothers Schlumpf copy of the Royale Esders Coupe on display at Rétromobile 2015

The famous Bugatti collectors, the Schlumpf brothers, liked the original Dr Armand Esders coupe body on chassis 41111, using original Bugatti parts they had a copy made of the car. It now resides with the two originals they purchased at the Musée National de l'Automobile de Mulhouse.

== Replicas ==
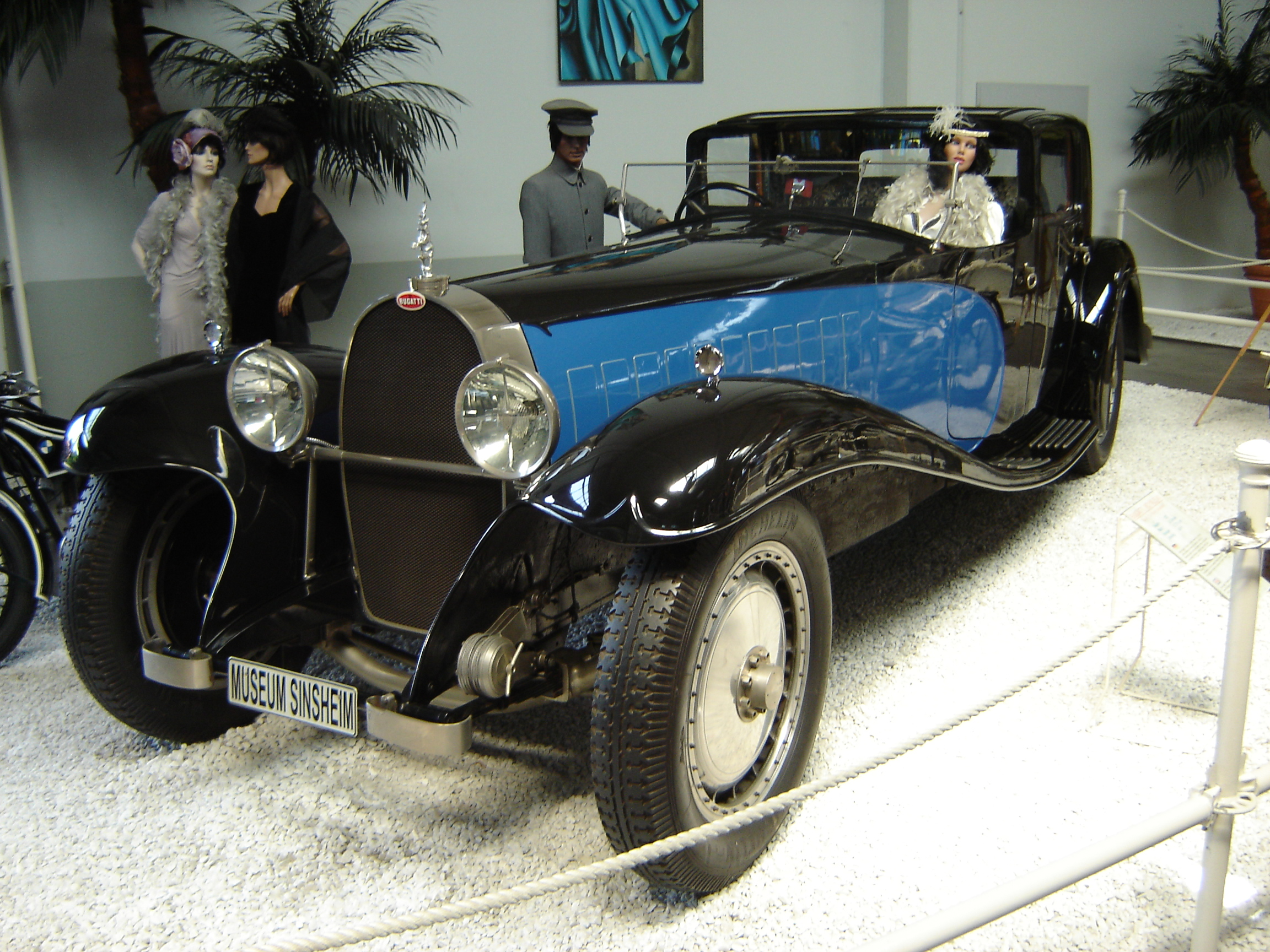
Replica of Coupe Napoleon, made for the French film Rebus with an American V8 engine, now residing in the Sinsheim Auto & Technik Museum

Due to the rarity of the Type 41 and its associated price, a number of replicas have been made.

The late Tom Wheatcroft commissioned Ashton Keynes Vintage Restorations (AKVR) to build an exact replica of Bugatti's personal car, the Coupe Napoleon (chassis number 41100), for his Donington Grand Prix Collection in England. It has since been sold and left the collection. So good was the replica, that when the Kellner car needed a replacement piston, its then Japanese owners commissioned South Cerney Engineering, part of AKVR, to provide a replacement.

On May 24, 2008, Prince Joachim of Denmark on the day of his wedding to Princess Marie (formerly Marie Cavallier) had Wheatcroft's replica waiting outside Møgeltønder Church to drive the newly married couple to Schackenborg Castle.

In 2011, a reconstruction of the 41100 Packard prototype by Dutch company Hevec Classics was presented at the Molsheim festival. It claims to use the original prototype chassis frame and other parts and was initially fitted with a replica engine (built by Tom Wheatcroft).

In 2016, the same team that reconstructed the Packard prototype, led by Frank Slopsma, unveiled a new replica of the Royale Esders Roadster at the RETRO CLASSICS show in Stuttgart, Germany.

A year later this same team showed a part-finished replica of the Weymann coach version of the 41100 Royale prototype at the Mondorf Classic Days & Concours d'Elegance. All three replicas built by the team were shown at the show, they were built for an undisclosed Dutch owner.

The Sinsheim Auto & Technik Museum has a replica of the 41100 Coupe Napoleon that was built for the 1968 film Rebus.

The much smaller Panther De Ville (produced between 1974 and 1985) consciously resembled the Type 41.

== Reunion ==
In the 1985 Pebble Beach Concours d'Elegance, all six cars appeared together on display.

In 2007, five of the six cars were on display at the Goodwood Festival of Speed to celebrate the Royale's eightieth anniversary.

== See also ==
- Rolls-Royce Phantom IV, another luxury car model devised to be sold to the royalty.
