= Malmerspach =

Commune in Grand Est, France

- Commune
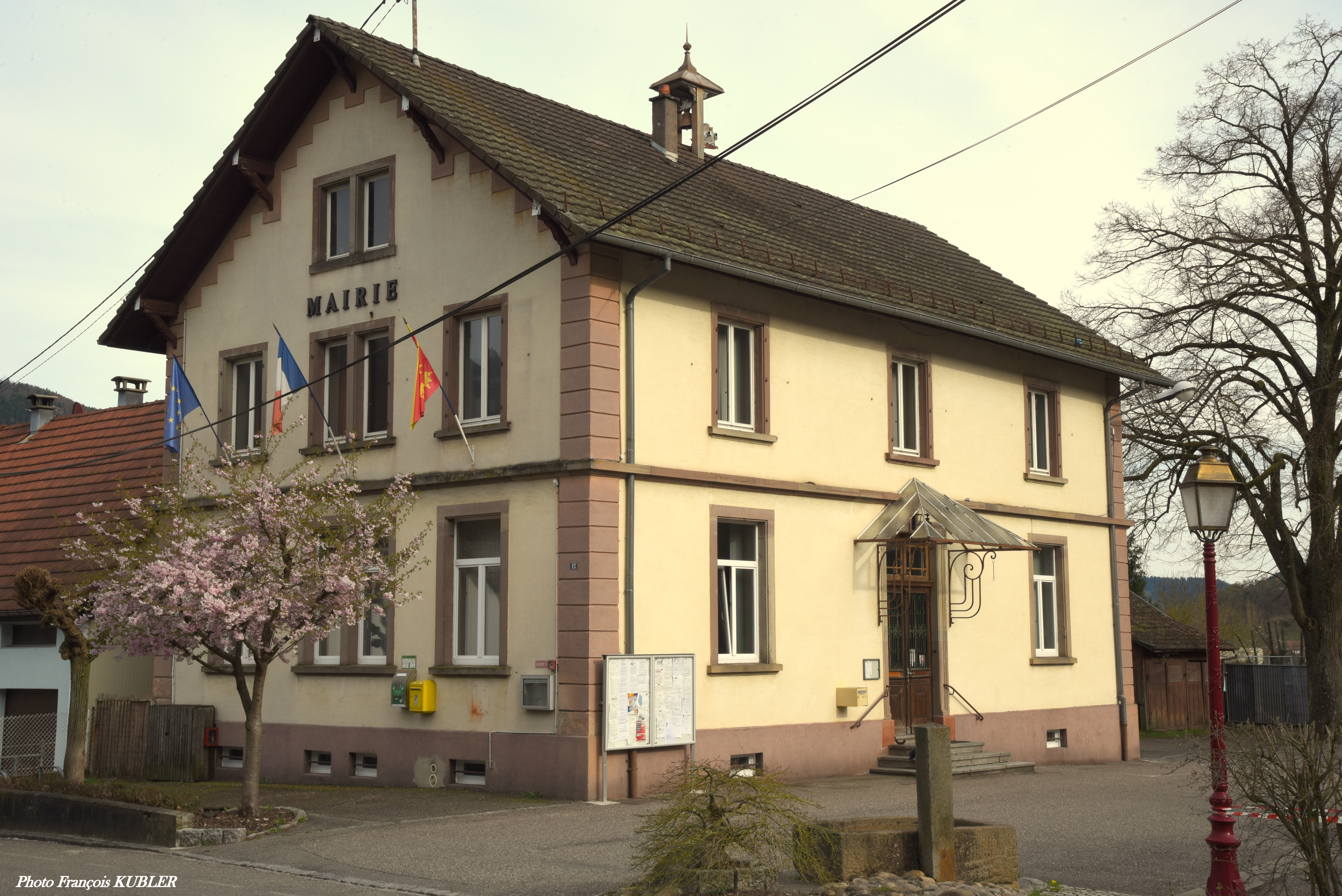
- The town hall in Malmerspach

- Coat of arms
- Location of Malmerspach
- Location within France Location within Grand Est
- Coordinates: 47°51′53″N 7°02′07″E
- Country: France
- Region: Grand Est
- Department: Haut-Rhin
- Arrondissement: Thann-Guebwiller
- Canton: Cernay
- Intercommunality: Vallée de Saint-Amarin

Government
  - Mayor (2020–2026): Eddie Stutz
- Area^{1}: 2.66 km^{2} (1.03 sq mi)
- Elevation: 400 m (1,300 ft)
- Highest elevation: 868 m (2,848 ft)
- Lowest elevation: 386 m (1,266 ft)
- Population (2023): 475
  - Density: 179/km^{2} (462/sq mi)
- Time zone: UTC+01:00 (CET)
  - Summer (DST): UTC+02:00 (CEST)
- INSEE/Postal code: 68199 /68550
- ^{1} French Land Register data, which excludes lakes, ponds, glaciers > 1 km^{2} (0.386 sq mi or 247 acres) and river estuaries.

Malmerspach is a commune in the Haut-Rhin department in Grand Est in north-eastern France.

== Geography ==
Located between the cantonal capital of Saint-Amarin (1 km) and the district capital of Thann (8 km), in the Thur Valley.

It is one of the 188 communes of the Ballons des Vosges Nature Park.

=== Hydrography ===
==== Hydrographic network ====
The commune is located in the Rhine watershed within the Rhine-Meuse basin. It is drained by the Thur River.

The Thur River, 53 km long, rises in the commune of Wildenstein and flows into the Ill River at Ensisheim, after crossing 20 communes. The hydrological characteristics of the Thur River are provided by the hydrological station located in the commune of Willer-sur-Thur. The average monthly flow rate is 5.12 m3/s. The maximum average daily flow rate is 112 m3/s, reached during the flood of April 9, 1983. The maximum instantaneous flow rate is 137 m3/s, reached on the same day.

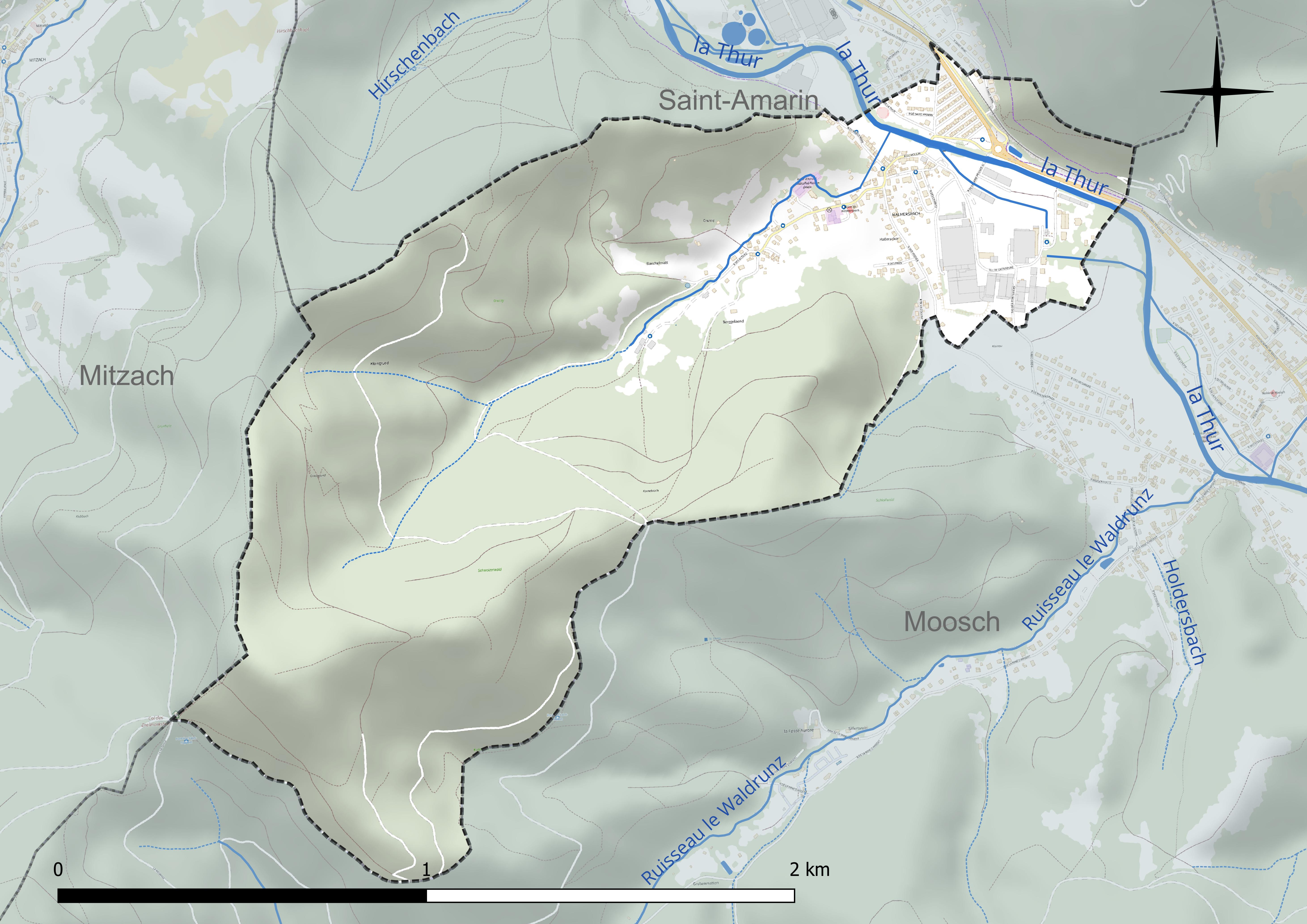
Malmerspach hydrographic network

==== Water management and quality ====
The municipal territory is covered by the "Thur" Water Development and Management Plan (SAGE). This planning document concerns the Thur watershed. This area covers 544 km². The perimeter was established on March 4, 1996, and the SAGE itself was approved on May 14, 2001. The structure responsible for its development and implementation is the Haut-Rhin Departmental Directorate of Agriculture and Forestry.

Watercourse quality can be consulted on a dedicated website managed by the water agencies and the French Agency for Biodiversity.

== Urban planning ==
=== Typology ===
As of January 1, 2024, Malmerspach is categorized as a small town, according to the new seven-level municipal density scale defined by INSEE in 2022. It belongs to the Saint-Amarin urban unit, an intra-departmental agglomeration comprising nine communes, of which it is a suburban commune. Furthermore, the commune is part of the Mulhouse catchment area, of which it is a peripheral municipality. This area, which includes 132 municipalities, is categorized as having a population between 200,000 and 700,000.

=== Land use ===
Land cover in the commune, as shown in the European biophysical land cover database Corine Land Cover (CLC), is characterized by the significant presence of forests and semi-natural areas (81.6% in 2018), a proportion identical to that of 1990 (81.6%). The detailed breakdown in 2018 is as follows: forests (81.6%), industrial or commercial areas and communication networks (13.4%), heterogeneous agricultural areas (3%), and urbanized areas (2.1%). The evolution of land cover in the commune and its infrastructure can be observed on various maps of the territory: the Cassini map (18th century), the General Staff map (1820-1866), and IGN maps or aerial photographs for the current period (1950 to the present).

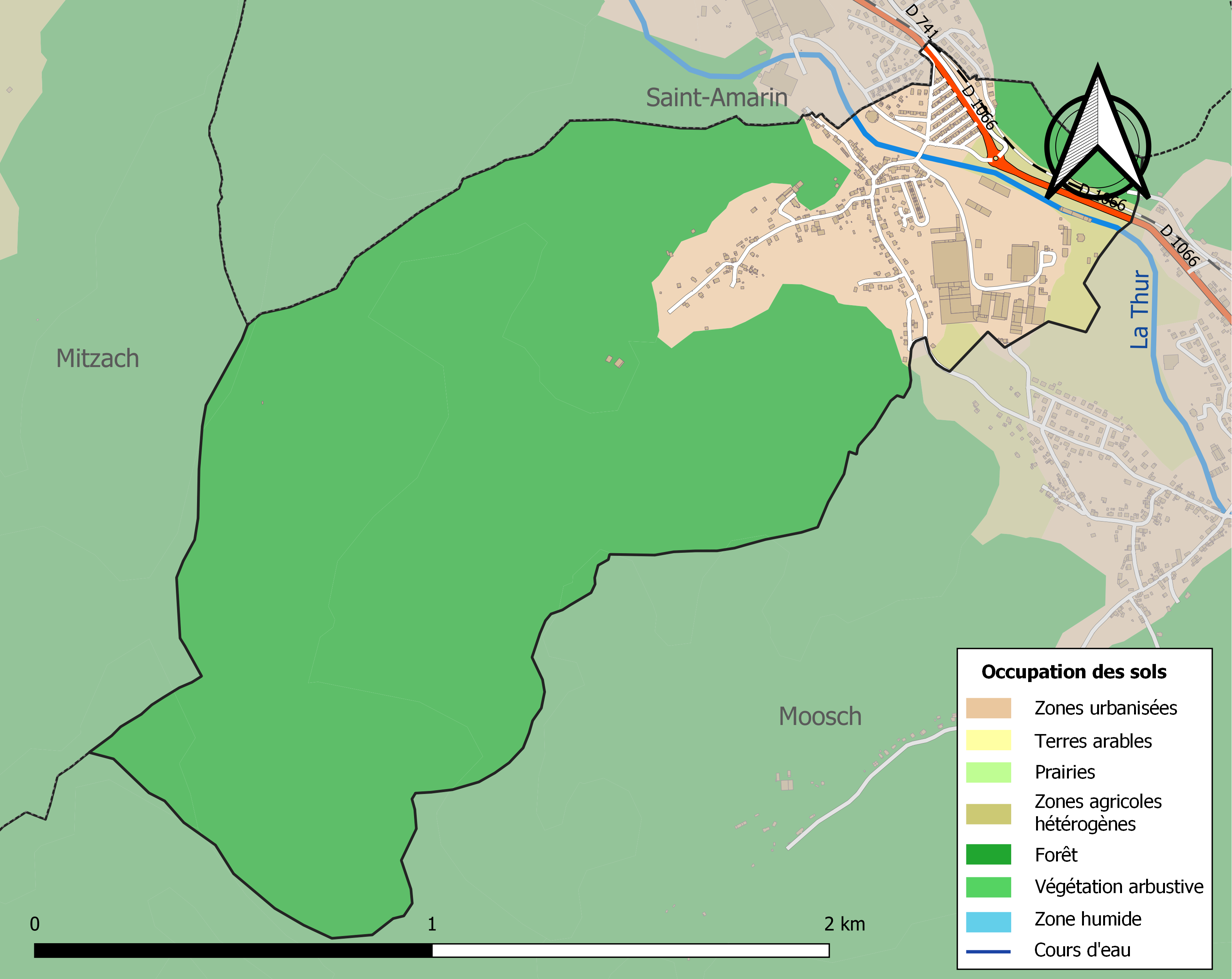
Map of infrastructure and land use of Malmerspach

== History ==
In 1506, this small hamlet, then called "Malberspach," was part of the territory of Murbach Abbey, and remained so until 1789. The chapel is dedicated to Saint Joseph the Craftsman. From 1844, the worsted wool spinning mill brought worldwide renown to the village until its liquidation in October 1976.

In 1935, the Schlumpf brothers invested their fortune in Alsatian textiles by purchasing the town's spinning mill.

During World War II, Malmerspach is part of Nazi Germany.

In 1971, the two Schlumpf brothers boasted of owning, along with Malmerspach, Erstein, Gluck, and HKC, the entire French worsted wool spinning industry.

=== Heraldry ===
| Arms of Malmerspach | Cut, the first couped gules and azure, with a rising crescent argent broaching on the score, the second azure with a spinning reel argent in pale, with a torn fir tree vert broaching on a bar or placed on the score. |

== Monuments and sights ==
- The Church of Saint Joseph the Craftsman and the Gaston Kern organ, dating from 1977.
- War memorial.
- Roman road. The Schlumpf brothers' weaving mills, closed in October 1976.
- The Hartmann-Liebach worsted wool spinning mill and its workers' housing.

== See also ==
- Communes of the Haut-Rhin département
