= Hans and Fritz Schlumpf =

Italian-born Swiss industrialists, collectors and convicted fraudsters

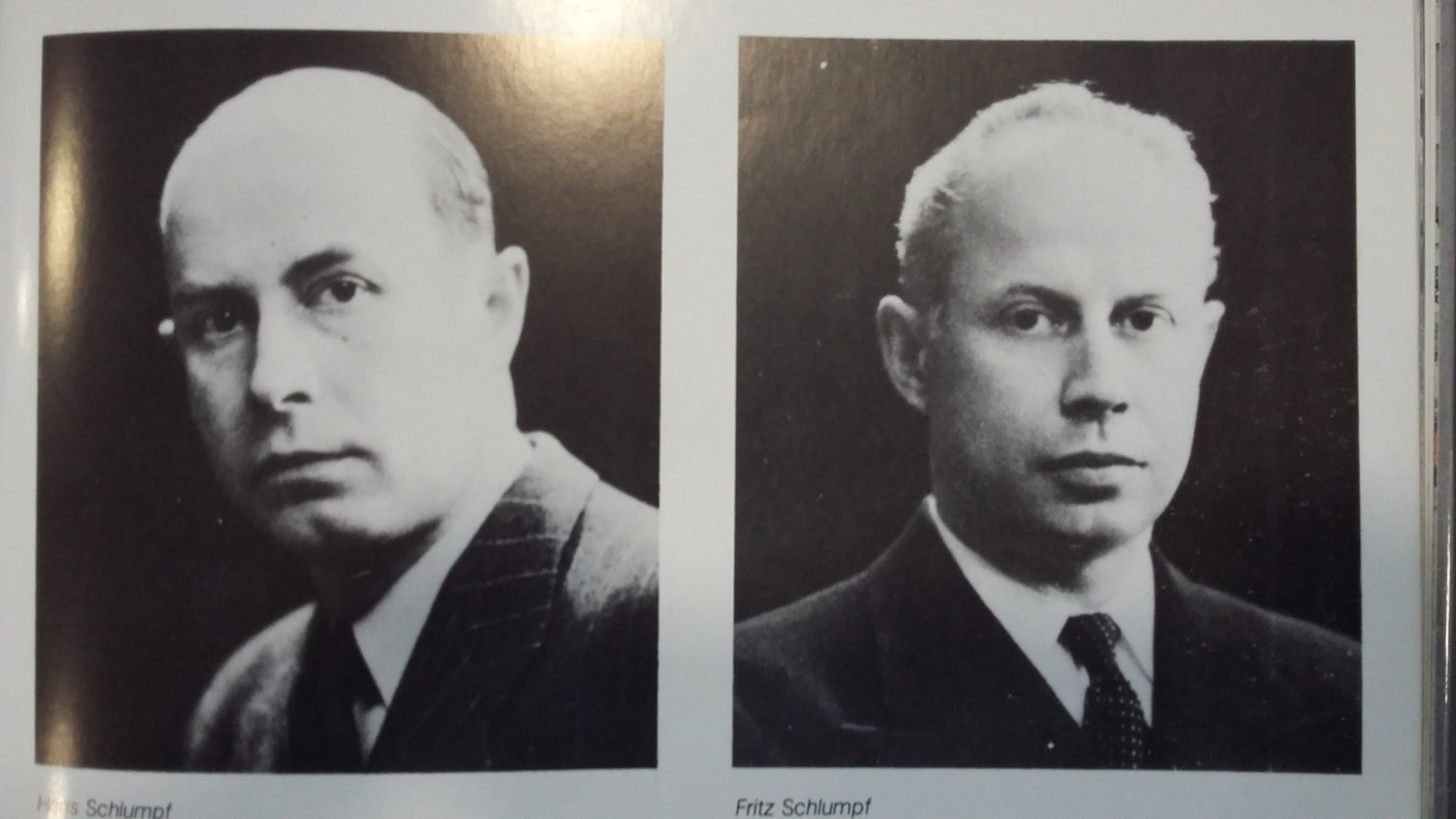
- Schlumpf Brothers, 1950s
- Born: Hans Schlumpf February 21, 1904 Omegna, Kingdom of Italy; Fritz Schlumpf February 24, 1906 Omegna, Kingdom of Italy
- Died: Hans January 1, 1989 (aged 84) Basel, Switzerland; Fritz April 18, 1992 (aged 86) Basel, Switzerland
- Occupations: Industrialists, automobile collectors
- Known for: Founding Schlumpf Collection
- Spouse(s): Fritz Schlumpf Arlette Naas (m. 1990)
- Children: Fritz Schlumpf; 2

Giovanni Carlo Vittorio Schlumpf known as Hans Schlumpf (February 21, 1904 – January 1, 1989) and Federico Filippo Augustino Schlumpf known as Fritz Schlumpf (February 24, 1906 – April 18, 1992) more prominently known as Schlumpf Brothers were Italian-born Swiss textile industrialists, automobile collectors and convicted fraudsters. They are best known for founding the Schlumpf Collection currently housed in Musée National de l'Automobile de Mulhouse.

The Schlumpf Collection which was founded and developed between 1935 and 1976 belongs to the world's most important private automobile collections with over 560 automobiles of various luxury and sports car makes, most prominently 123 Bugattis and 14 Rolls-Royces. 430 of those automobiles are classified as historically protected.

The Schlumpf brothers financed their collection by bankrupting their company and to avoid charges they fled to Switzerland where they remained in exile until their death, since Swiss citizens will not be extradited to foreign jurisdictions. The widow of Fritz Schlumpf, Arlette Schlumpf-Naas, would later fight for restitution after his death.

== Early lives and education ==
The Schlumpf brothers were both born in Omegna, Piedmont near Milan, in 1904 respectively 1906, the only children, of Carl Schlumpf (1871–1918), a textile engineer and later industrialist, and Jeanne Schlumpf (née Becker; 1878–1957).

Their father was originally from Neuhaus in Eastern Switzerland and came to Mulhouse, where he worked in the horticultural company of his in-laws. Their father was Catholic and their mother a devout Lutheran Calvinist. Carl Schlumpf later sought participations in the textile industry, which brought him to the Kingdom of Italy. In 1908, the Schlumpf family returned to Mulhouse, where the brothers were ultimately raised. Hans attended a Swiss private school while Fritz attended and graduated from public high school in Mulhouse.

== Professional career ==
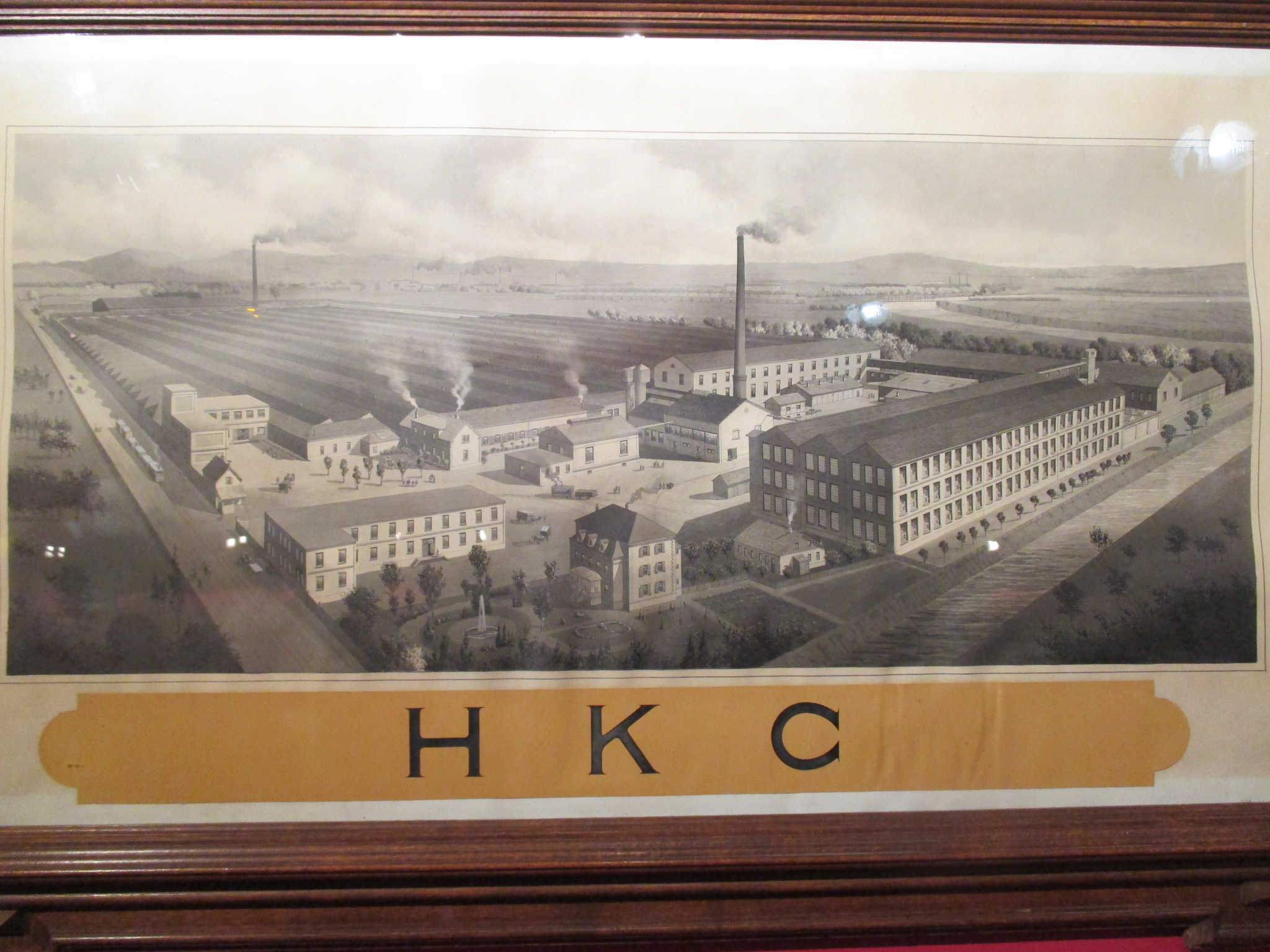
HKG in Mulhouse, acquired by the Schlumpf brothers in 1957

In 1928, Fritz worked as a successful wool broker and Hans was in banking, they decided to ultimately seek financial participations in the industry. They sought out speculative deals and made huge profits. Fritz admired the Alsatian textile industrialists from an early age and made himself way into the prestigious Société Industrielle du Mulhouse (SIM) where he was acquainted with several industry professionals. However, he was never fully accepted into the coveted society and seen as a parvenu.

At the end of the Great Depression of 1929, they were among the French monetary elite. In 1935, they founded SAIL (Société Anonyme pour l'Industrie Lainière), a public company trading in wool. They started buying up several textile manufacturing plants, most prominently a spinning mill in Malmerspach in 1957, about 20 miles (or 30 kilometers) Northwest from Mulhouse (formerly Eck, Guth & Cie.), which was owned by a Jewish family who faced persecution during World War II. Until its bankruptcy and dissolution 1977, this spinning mills employed over 3,000 workers and was the most important employer of the region. SAIL became a mayor textile concern which basically held a quasi-monopoly in Eastern France and grew steadily until the textile crisis of the 1970s. They were also diversified in wine estates in the Champagne region and real estate.

== Schlumpf Affair and Collection ==
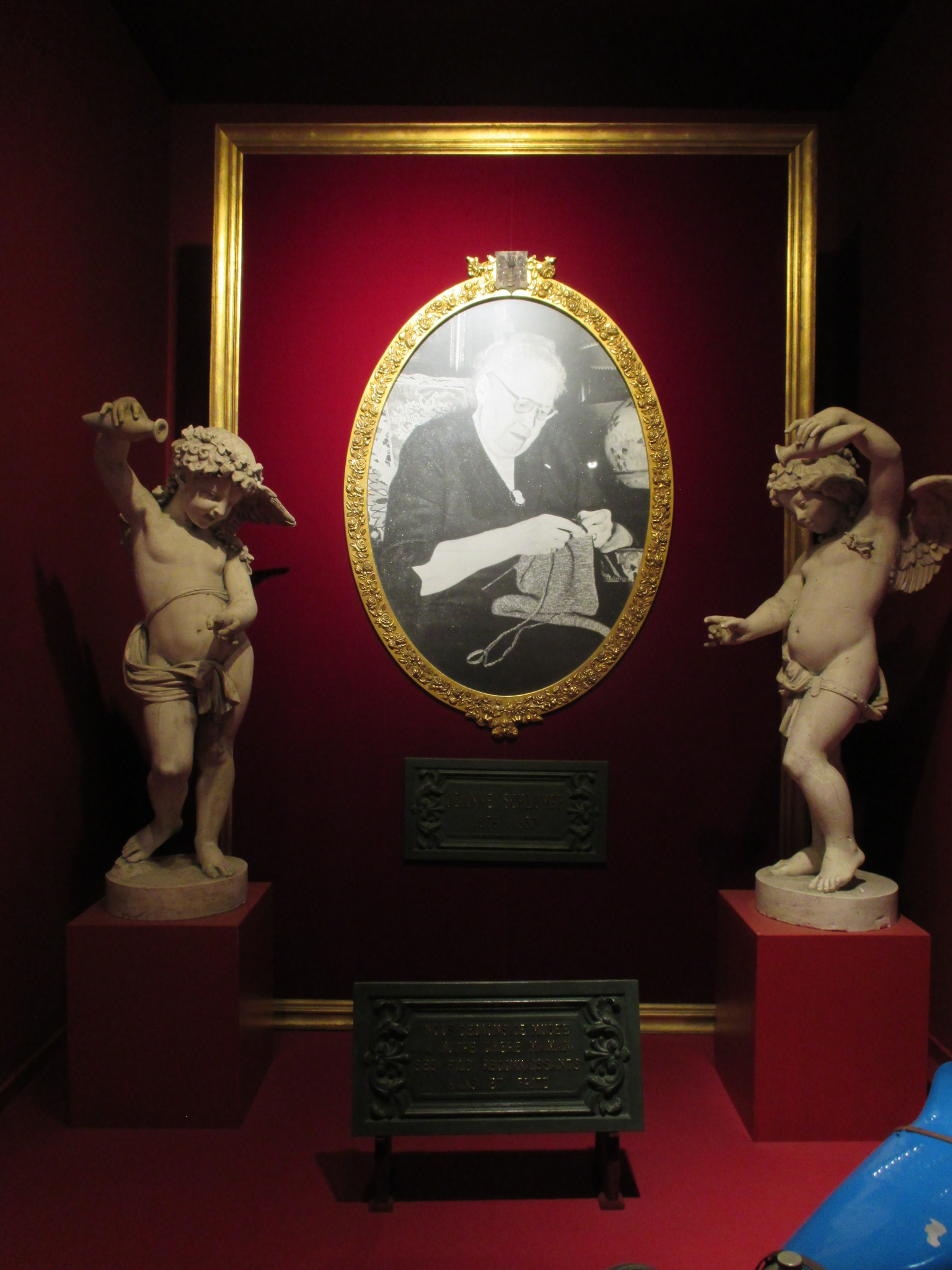
Memorial for Jeanne Schlumpf (née Becker; 1878–1957)

Fritz Schlumpf acquired his first Bugatti aged 22 as young, successful wool broker in 1928. He regularly participated in motorsport events and had a passion for the technique of automobiles. He became close to the Bugatti brand which was located in nearby Molsheim. After World War II, Fritz and Hans Schlumpf gathered an enormous collection of classic automobiles, including several hundred Bugattis (many of them in pieces or unrestored, but many were also completed cars).

To fund this hobby they encumbered their enterprise to such an extent that by 1977 it became insolvent. Until this time the automobile collection was unknown to the public, but the excesses were revealed in 1977 during a strike by the former Schlumpf textile workers. On February 10, 1977, the French Justice System issued an arrest warrant against the former industrialists and owners of textile factories in Malmerspach, Mulhouse (HKC), Erstein and Roubaix. The Schlumpf Collection which was then valued at 100 million French francs (or 50 million Swiss francs) was provisionally seized by authorities. At this time, the Schlumpf brothers, already entered Switzerland on their Swiss passports, avoiding persecution. On March 23, 1983, both brothers were sentenced to prison terms of two respectively four years due to fraudulent bankruptcy and embezzlement. In 1988, the sentence was confirmed by the High Courts of Mulhouse in France.

== Personal life ==
Both brothers remained long-term bachelors and resided together in Malmerspach until 1977. After the dissolution of the business and the French government charging them with fraudulent bankruptcy, they fled France into exile in Switzerland. There they initially resided at Hotel Les Trois Rois in Basel.

In 1990, shortly before his death, Fritz Schlumpf was married to Arlette Naas (1931–2008), originally from Neuviller-sur-Moselle, who kept fighting for his restitution even after his death. Through her he had two daughters; Martine Herrmann (née Schlumpf; died 2001) and Arlette-Cléophée "Cléophée" Schlumpf.

In 2024, it became public that Cléophée Herrmann (born 1990), sometimes also referred as Cléophée Herrmann Schlumpf, a daughter of Patrick Hermann and Martine Schlumpf, and hence granddaughter of Fritz, was defrauded of her inheritance by her own family, which was then estimated at £9 million (about $12 million in 2024).

== Literature ==
- Jenkinson, Denis; Verstappen, Peter (1978). The Schlumpf Obsession. Book Club Associates. ISBN 0-600-38312-1.
- op de Weegh, Ard; op de Weegh, Arnoud (December 2017). Schlumpf: de affaire achter de mooiste autocollectie ter wereld. The Netherlands: Alk B.V., Uitgeverij de. ISBN 9789059611894.
