= Stirling-Panhard =

Stirling-Panhard was a type of auto-mobile manufactured from 1898. It was fundamentally a French Clément-Panhard that was exported to Great Britain and sold by the Scottish coachbuilder 'Stirling' of Edinburgh as the 'Stirling dog cart'. Some were badged Stirling-Panhard and others as Clément-Stirling.

Adolphe Clément was a director of Panhard-Levassor, and when the factory could not meet the production requirements for circa 500 units of the 1898 'voiture légère' ('dog cart') model, he undertook manufacture under licence at his factory in Levallois-Perret. It was designed by airship pioneer Commandant Arthur Krebs, of Panhard, and used a tubular chassis, centre-pivot steering, near-horizontal 3.5 hp (2.6 kW) rear-mounted engine with automatic inlet valve and hot-tube ignition, driving through a constant-mesh gear-train, and final drive by side chains and early models had no reverse gear.

The English patent is dated 9 February 1899.
