= Clément-Panhard =

Voiture Clément-Panhard (VCP)
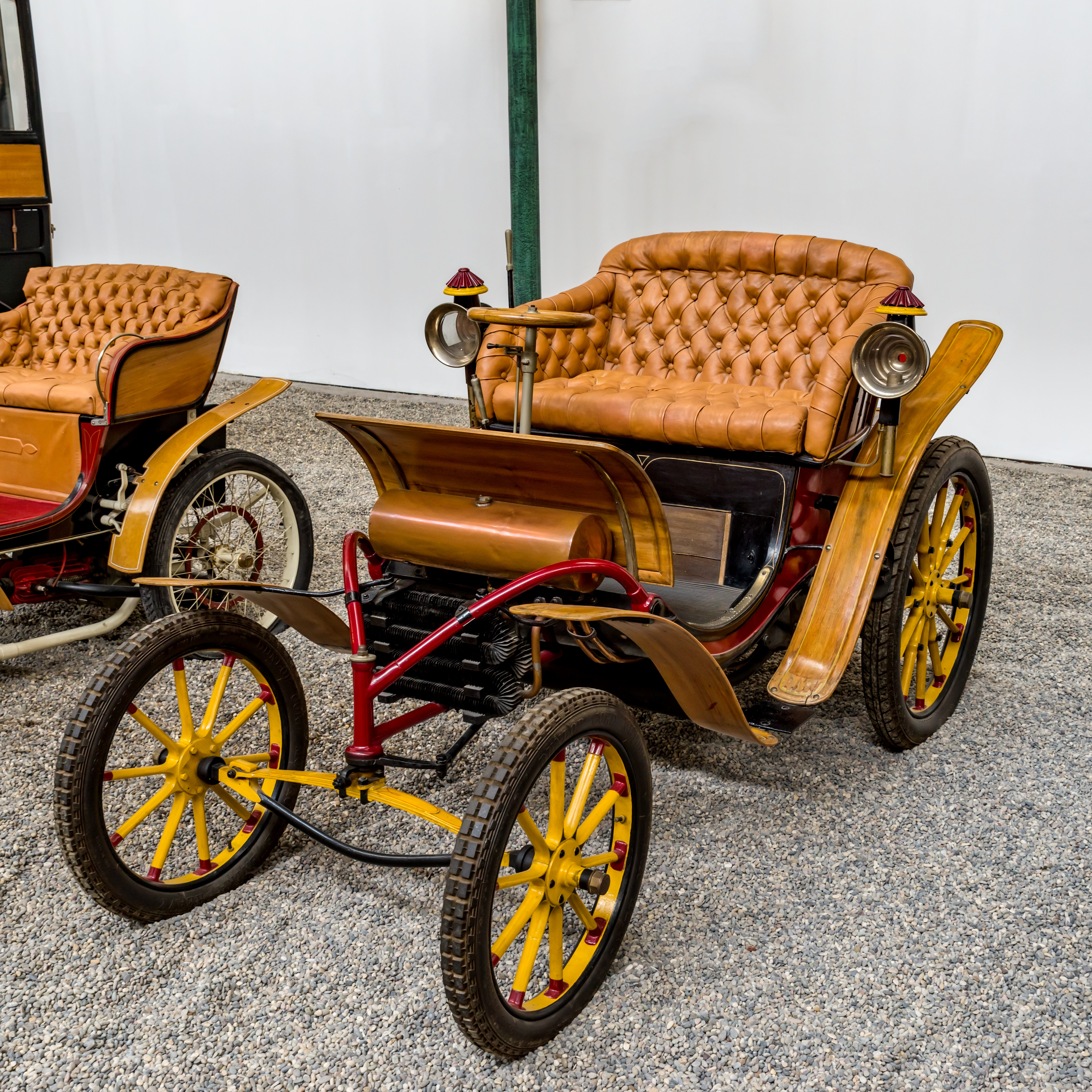

Overview
- Manufacturer: Panhard
- Production: 1898–1902; 500 produced
- Assembly: Panhard & Levassor, Paris, France
- Designer: Arthur Constantin Krebs

Body and chassis
- Body style: Phaeton
- Layout: FR layout

Clément-Panhard is an automobile designed in 1898 by Arthur Constantin Krebs, manager of Panhard & Levassor co, from his 1896 patent of a car fitted with an electromagnetic gearbox, whose licence was acquired by Émile Levassor.

When Adolphe Clément as chairman of the Board of Directors of Panhard-Levassor and project leader, saw the factory could not meet the production requirements for circa 500 units of that new model, he undertook manufacture under licence at his factory in Levallois-Perret under the name of Voiture Clément-Panhard (VCP).

The model was launched in December 1898 on the first Paris Motor Show where 300 orders were received. Production ran at least until 1902.

== The 1896 A. C. Krebs system car ==
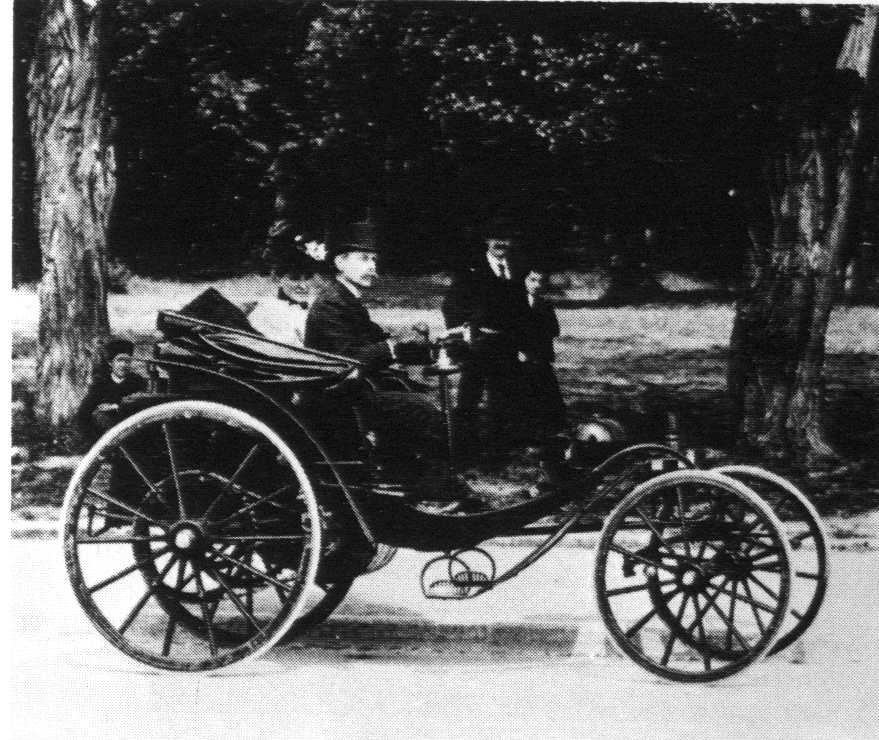
1896 – A . C. Krebs at the steering lever of his system car.

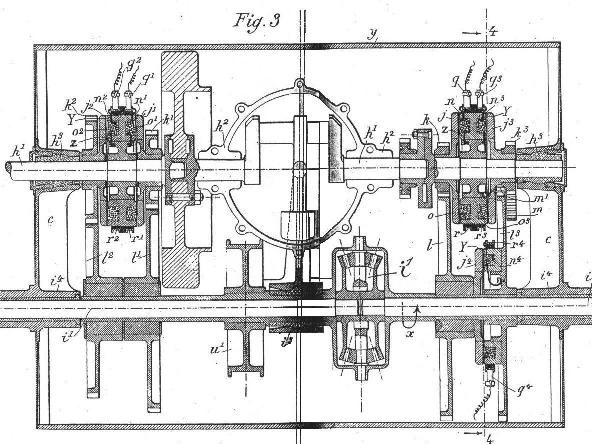
1896 – Electromagnetic gearbox from A. C. Kreb's car patent.

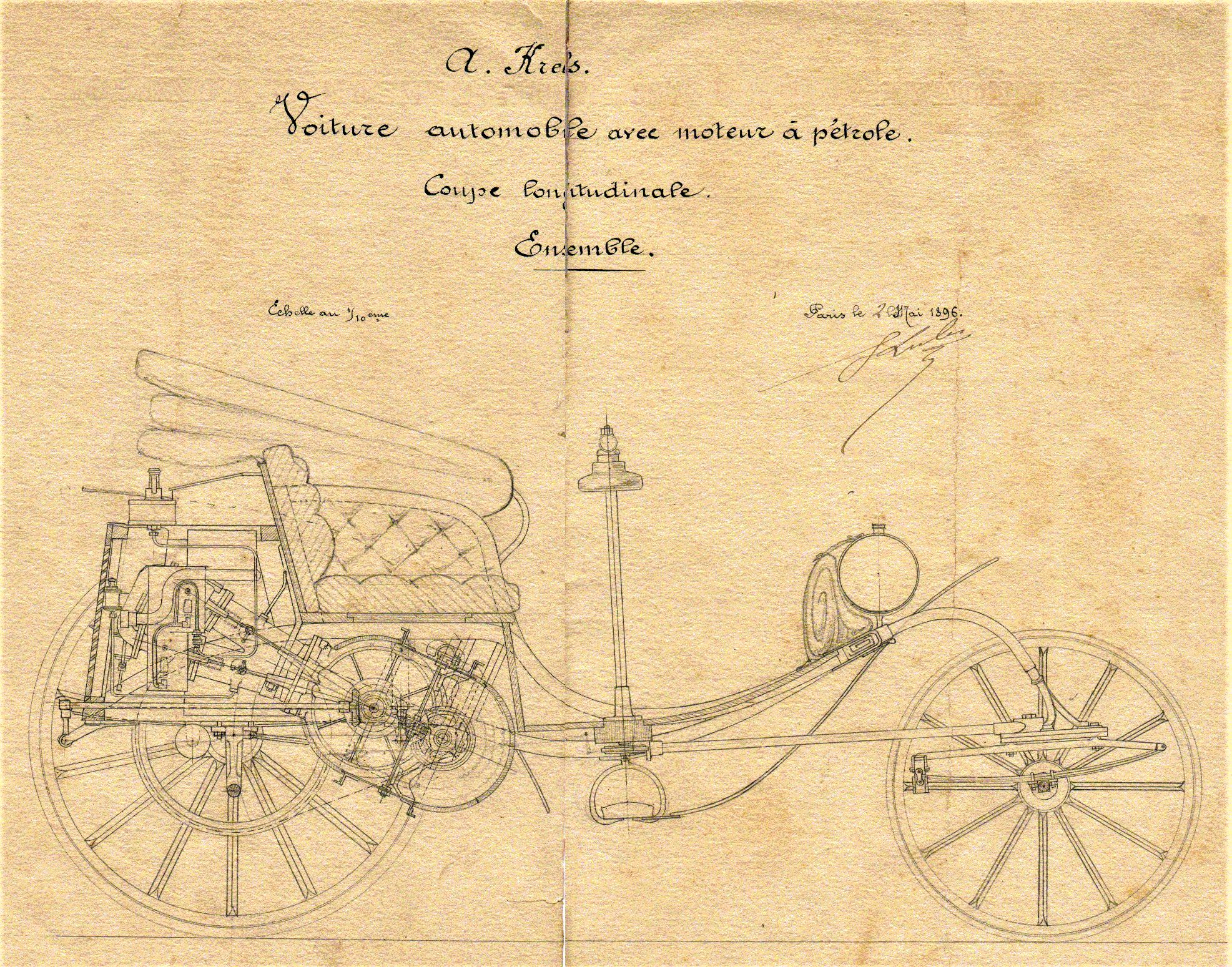
1896 - A. C. Krebs car patent drawing FR256344.

The 1896 Krebs system car (FR256344, GB189619774A) introduced several new features in the car design.

- The three point suspension system generalized (engine and chassis)

since we know that three points are enough to determine a plane.

To these sides [of the frame of the car] I fix or suspend at three points provided with pivoted joints, the motor mechanism which is thereby placed out of the influence of the deformations to which the frame of the car is liable to be subjected during the motion.

- The electromagnetic constant mesh gear box

I had imagined this arrangement to avoid the brutal shocks that the gears undergo when changing gear, a solution that seemed barbaric to me.

- The speed shifting at the steering device

For the purpose of operating the electro-magnetic clutch, I employ a commutator arranged preferably under the handle bar and adapted to be operated in such a manner as to establish, according to five different positions, the electrical connections that correspond respectively to: rest; forward movement at low speed; forward movement at medium speed; forward movement at high speed; and movement in the rearward direction.

- The damped steering and the rack and pinion steering gear

Upon the turntable of the fore-carriage is fixed a toothed sector in which engages a pinion mounted on the upper turntable and whose axle carries a toothed wheel situated in a box connected by two tubes to the box of the car. A second toothed wheel mounted on the steering spindle is connected to the first one by means of a chain passing through these two tubes. Elastic rods, consisting for example of coiled springs, are substituted for the links of the chain in the straightportions of the said tuges. By this means the chain is always taut and the springs neutralize the vibrations transmitted to the chain by the jolting of the fore-carriage and so prevent the said vibrations from being transmitted to the steering spindle.

- The forward (positive) caster angle on the steering axis

To ensure the stability of direction by the means of a special arrangement of the fore-carriage, that is to say, to re-establish automatically the parallélism of the two axles of the vehicle when there is no tendency to keep them in any other direction, or after a temporary effort has caused them to diverge from said parallélism; ... The axle of the fore-carriage is situated behind the projection of the axis of the pivot pin in order to ensure the stability of direction above referred to [of a quantity which can vary from 1/7 to 1/8 of the distance which separates the points of contact of the two front wheels with the ground].

- The metallic wheel hub system, Levassor to Krebs:

You would kindly give us permission to use your wheel hub system for which, since you say it is very good, it might be worth patenting.

- Aesthetic

The car of Commander Krebs, resulting from very personal and new ideas, has a particular and original aspect. We will add that this aspect is very satisfying and more elegant than any car that we have been allowed to see so far.

== The 1898 Voiture Clément-Panhard (VCP) model ==
1899-05-06 – The Autocar: "The light Panhard car". The mechanical version of the electromagnetic constant mesh gearbox of the A. C. Krebs system car.

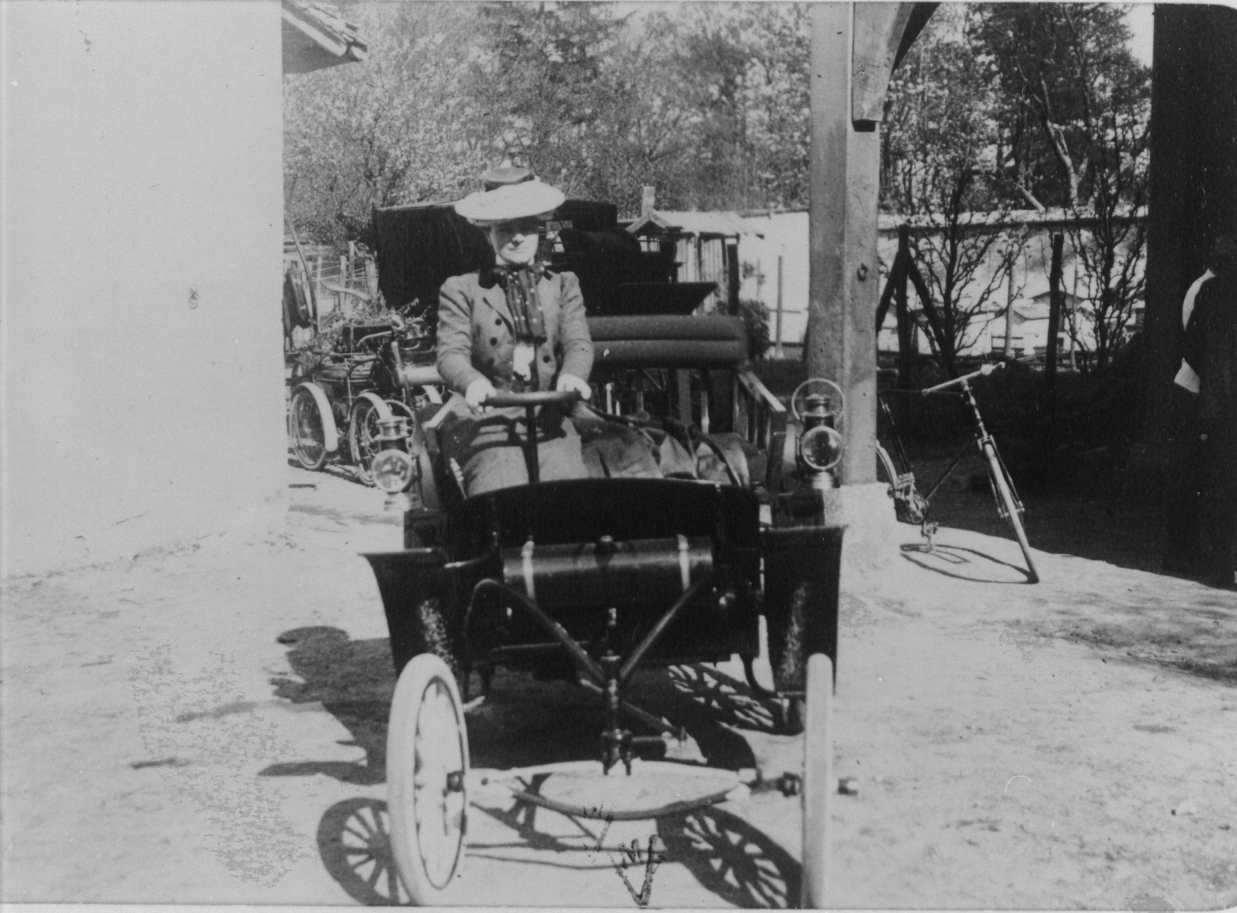
1900 – Clément-Panhard driven by a woman.

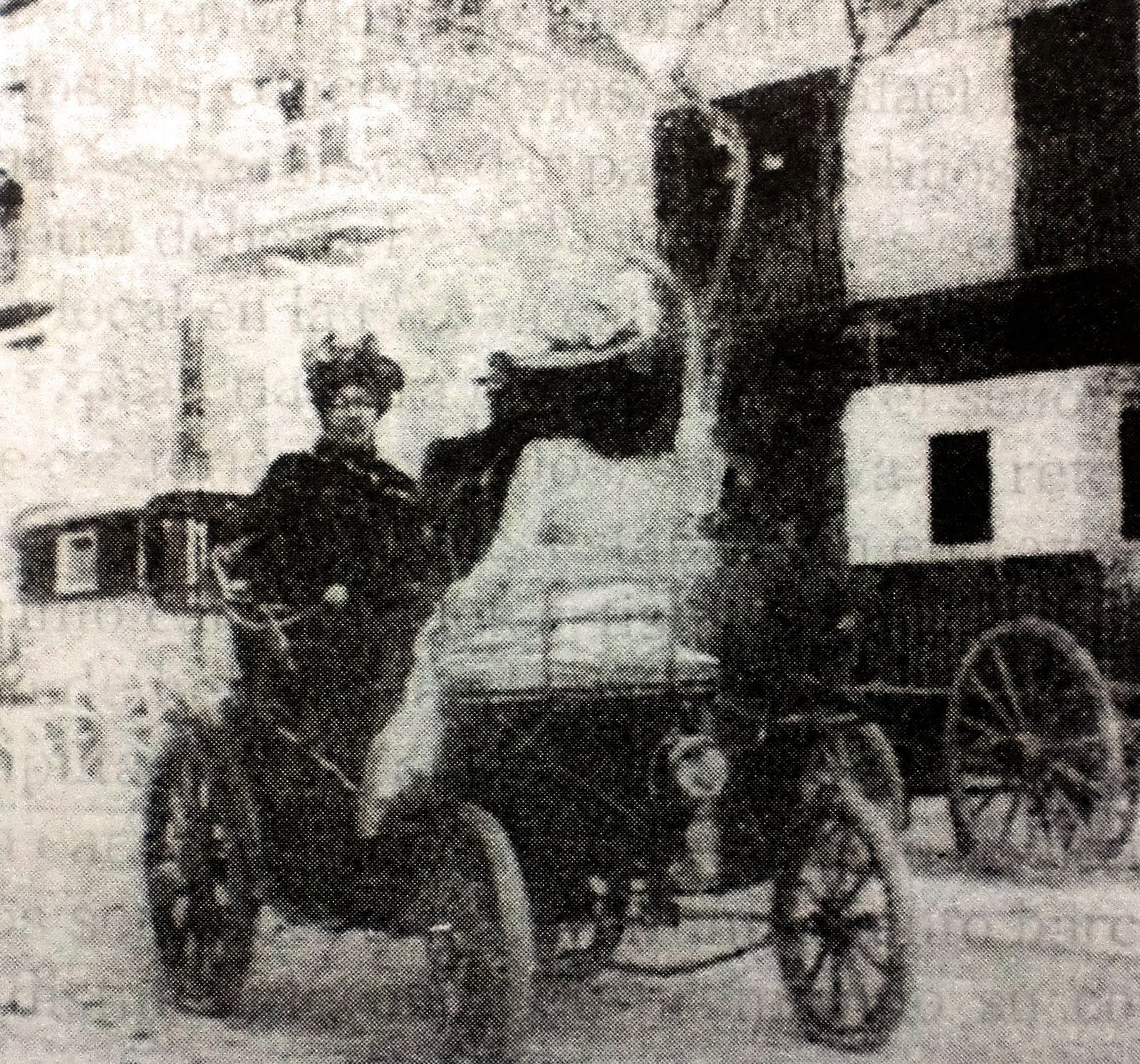
1900 - one of the first Spanish vehicles registered in the Balearic Islands.

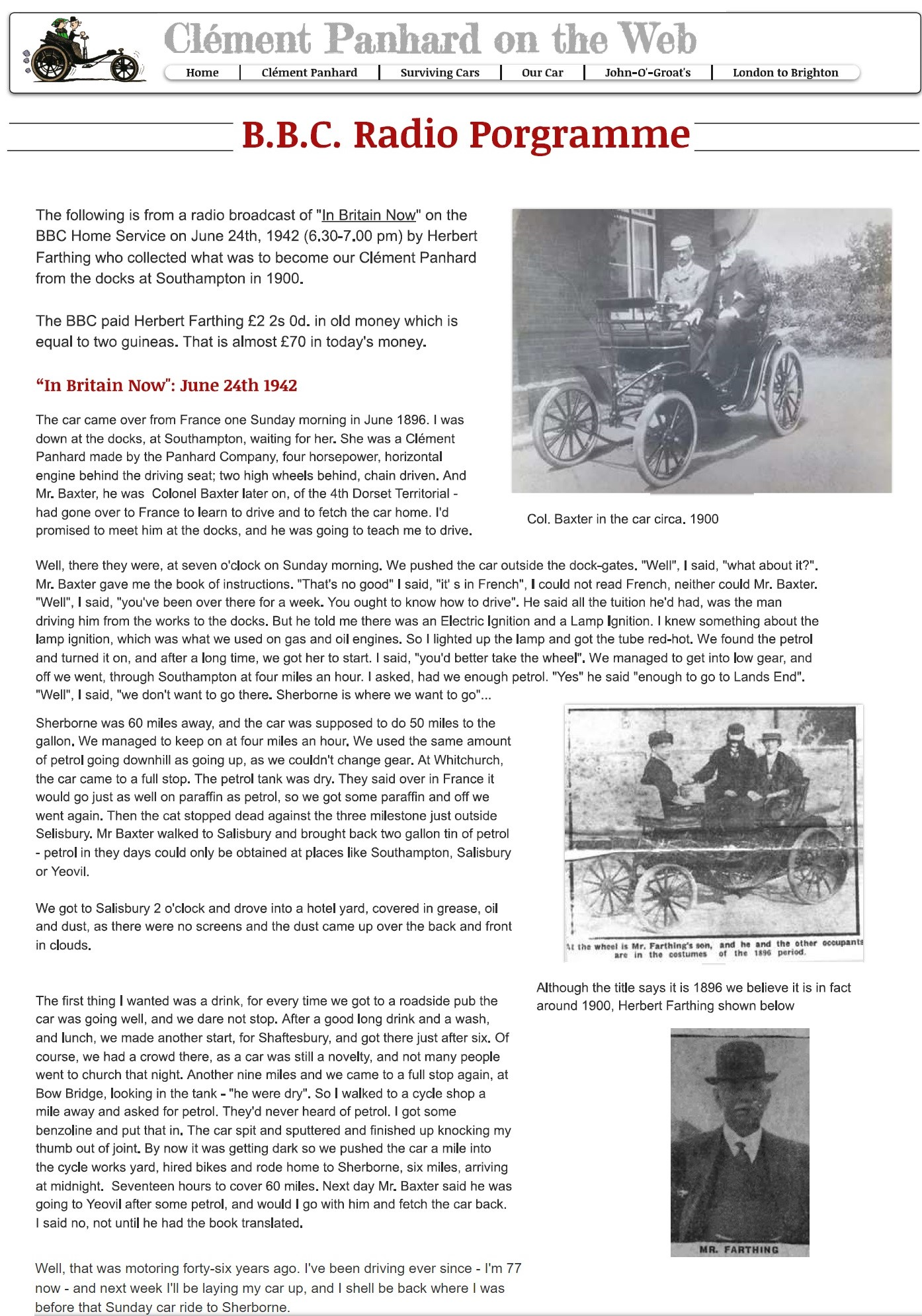
1900 – Mr Herbert Farthing collected his Clément-Panhard (VCP) from the docks at Southampton.

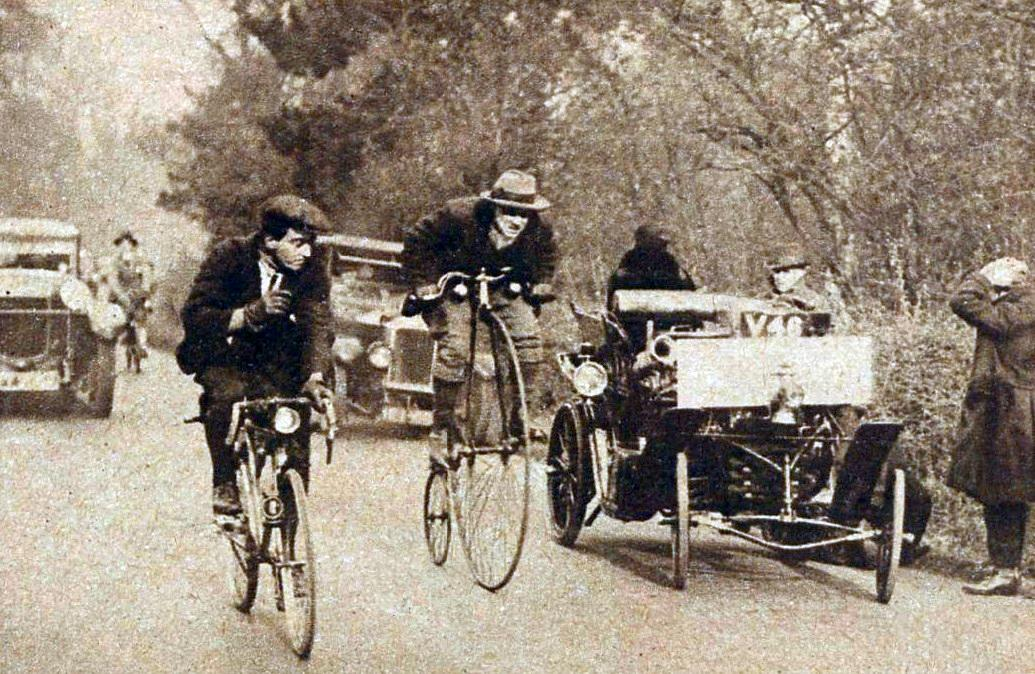
1927 - The VCP at the first London-to-Brighton veteran car run in November 1927.

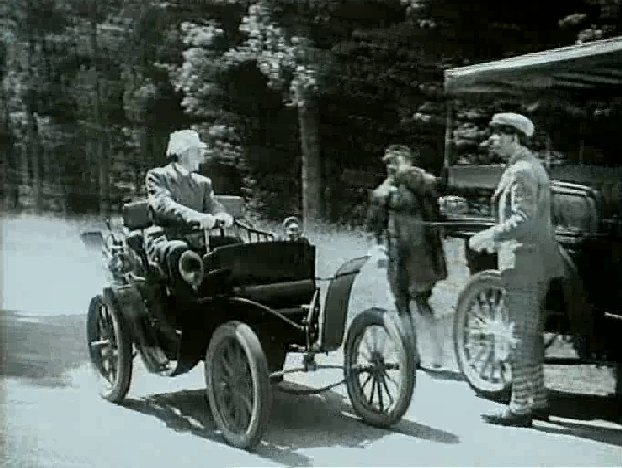
1946 – movie La revanche de Roger la honte: "In 1885. Roger Laroque, a courageous industrialist, is embroiled in a criminal intrigue by the deviousness of his mistress."

1950 – Clément-Panhard driving through Paris.

2004 – 1899 Panhard et Levassor – the Clément-Panhard Car (VCP) from A. C. Krebs: "a mechanical nightmare".

In 1896 A. C. Krebs intended to design a car system simple, reliable, aesthetic and secure for beginners. The 1898 Clément-Panhard car inherited the 1896 Krebs patent features, and got new ones.

Date	VCP patents	Title
1897	FR273374	The Krebs cone clutch: Improvements to clutches
	GB189730790A	Improvements in friction couplings
1897	FR273375	The mechanical constant-mesh Krebs gearbox: Improvements to transmissions with speed change
	GB189730791A	Improvements in speed changing transmission gear
	ES22155A1	A new transmission system, particularly applicable to automatic cars
1898	FR284596	The Voiture Clément-Panhard patent: A petroleum-powered light car system
	GB189902960A	Improvements in light motor road vehicles

- The three point suspension system generalized (engine and chassis)

This principle is identical, although the front axle is simpler. With the central pivot axle the intention of A. C. Krebs is double:

- Make the front axle independent of the chassis so as to keep the chassis in a horizontal position even in the event that one of the steering wheels is lifted by an object in its path:

One may wonder why this arrangement, generally considered defective for high-speed cars, was adopted for this cart. This is due to the fact that the manufacturer had above all in view to establish a car of a moderate price, essentially maneuverable, able to make turns on the spot and never having to exceed the speed of 30 kilometers per hour. Under these conditions the steering by rigid axle was perfectly admissible.

- Apply the caster angle principle (see below).
- The mechanical constant mesh gear box

The electromagnetic gearbox is replaced by a mechanical gearbox on the same principle of gears always in mesh.

- The speed shifting at the steering device

The speed shifting is now located on the right side of the car.

- The damped steering and the rack and pinion steering gear

This steering principle is identical, although the rack and pinion system is simpler.

- The forward (positive) caster angle on the steering axis

This steering principle is identical :

The swivel pin extending up from the front, axle for carrying the front end of the vehicle body, is connected to the axle spring by a bracket pivoted horizontally to the spring, and the swivel pin is slightly inclined backward at its upper end so that a downward extension of its axial line will pass at a slight angle in front of the wheel axle. By this arrangement when the front axle has been turned more or less out of its position parallel with the rear axle for lateral steering or turning, and is then released, it will, automatically move-back into the parallel position.

- The metallic wheel hub system

A. C. Krebs generalizes his metallic wheel hub system to the entire Panhard & Levassor range.

- Aesthetic Mr. de Nève said of his VCP in 1950:

It's a small Duke Clément-Panhard of 3 hp. A low, open, two-seater car, engine in the back, well made to show off, with a lady by its side.

- The Krebs cone clutch

The Levassor cone clutch improved by A. C. Krebs (see patent above).

- Engine regulation on admission

A. C. Krebs introduce the engine regulation on admission, instead of the exhaust (see patent above).

- 1899 – The constant level carburetor (FR295792).
- 1900 – The water circulation pump (FR300040).

=== Engine ===
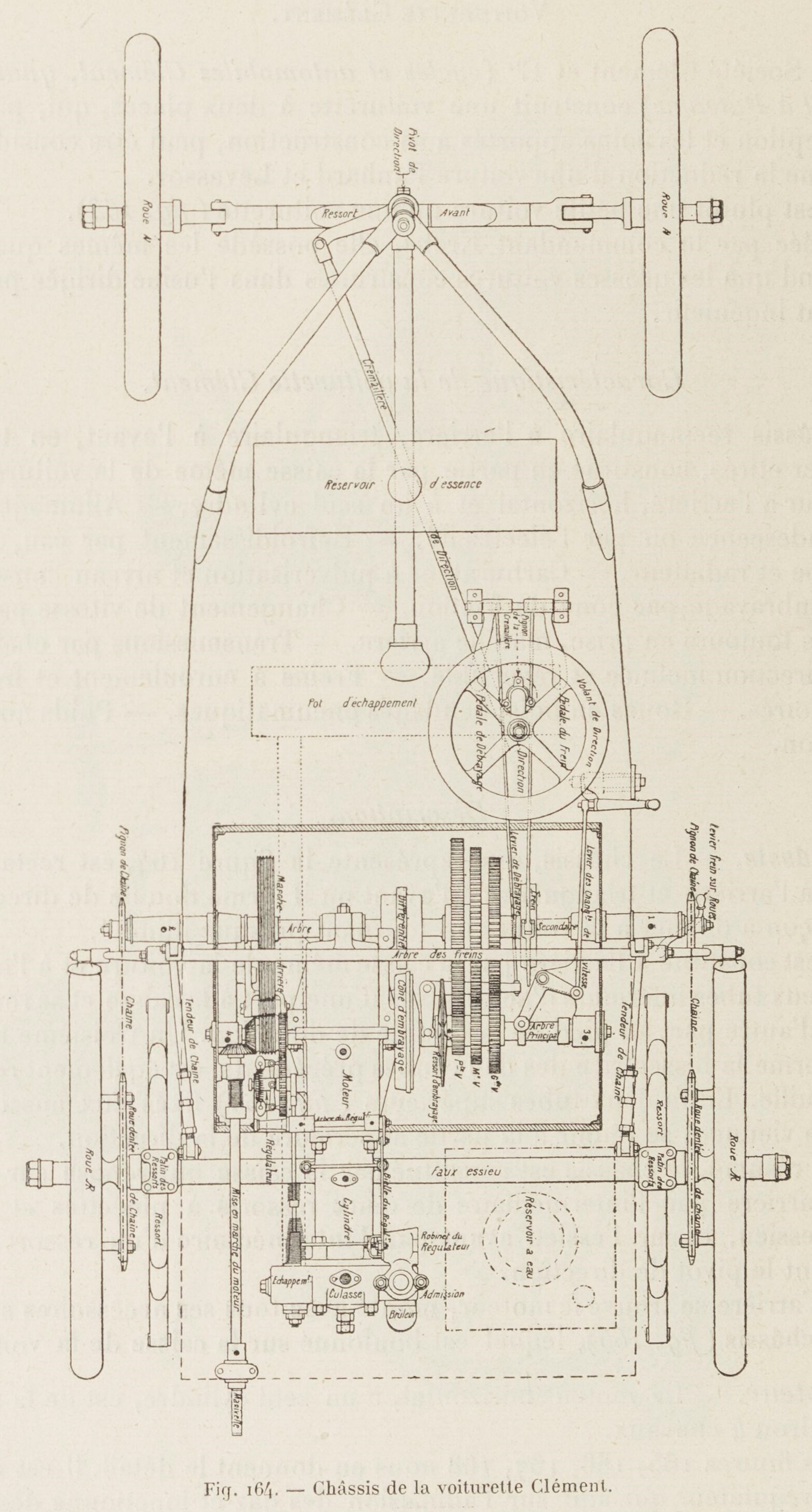
1900 – The VCP chassis: The Voiturette Clément-Panhard created by Commander Krebs has the same basic qualities as the big cars built in the factory run by this learned engineer.

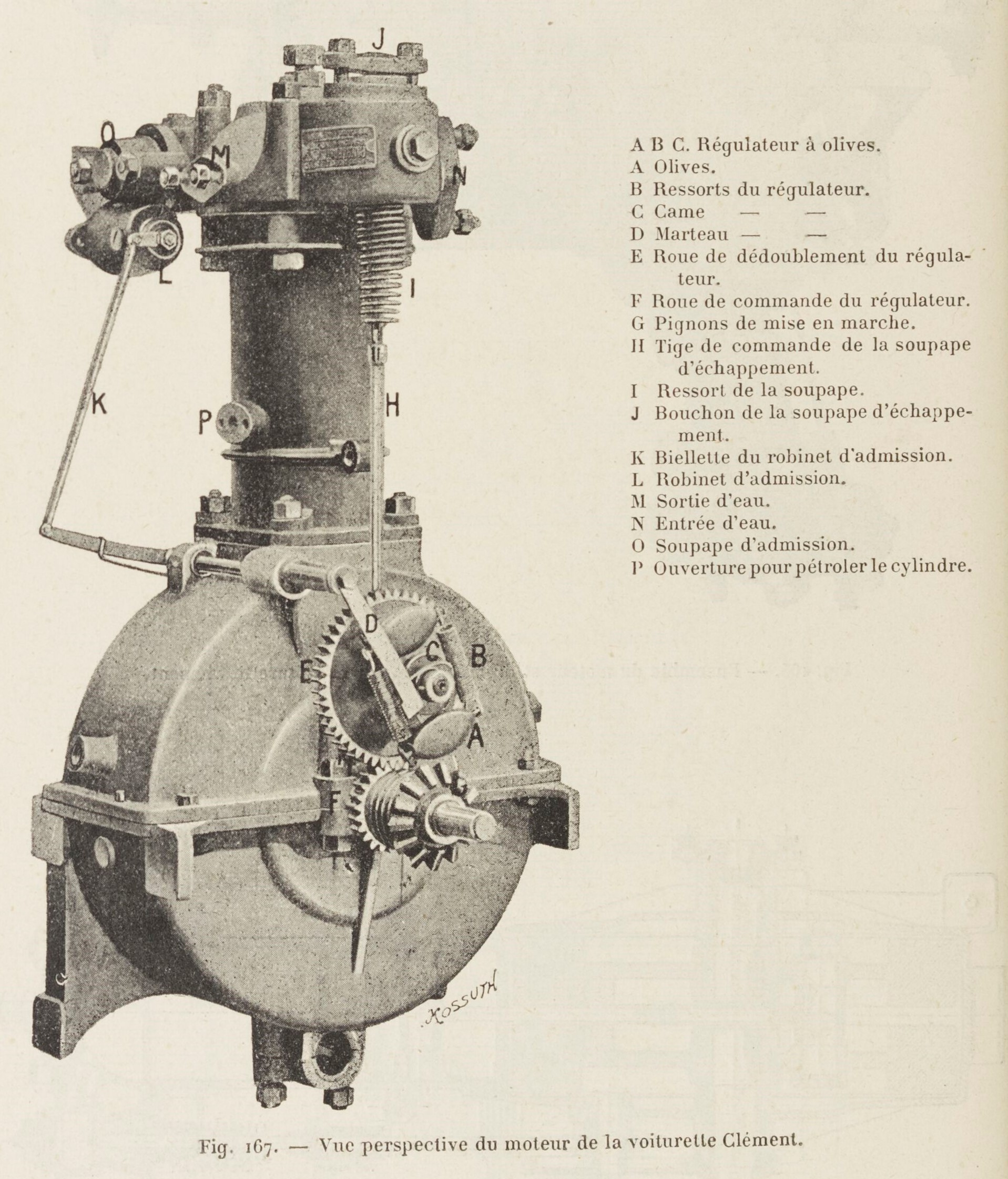
1900 – The VCP engine.

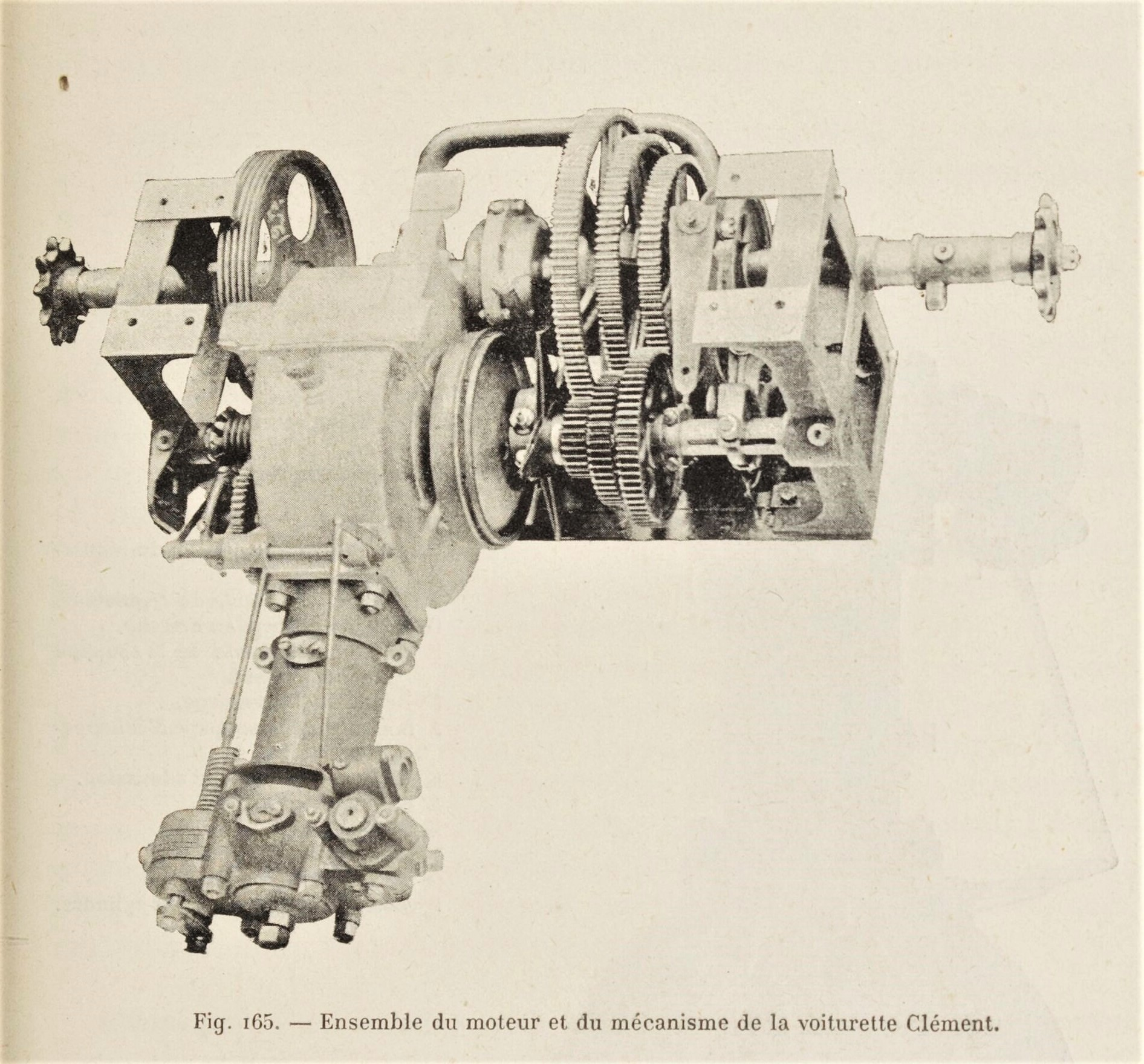
1900 – The VCP engine block.

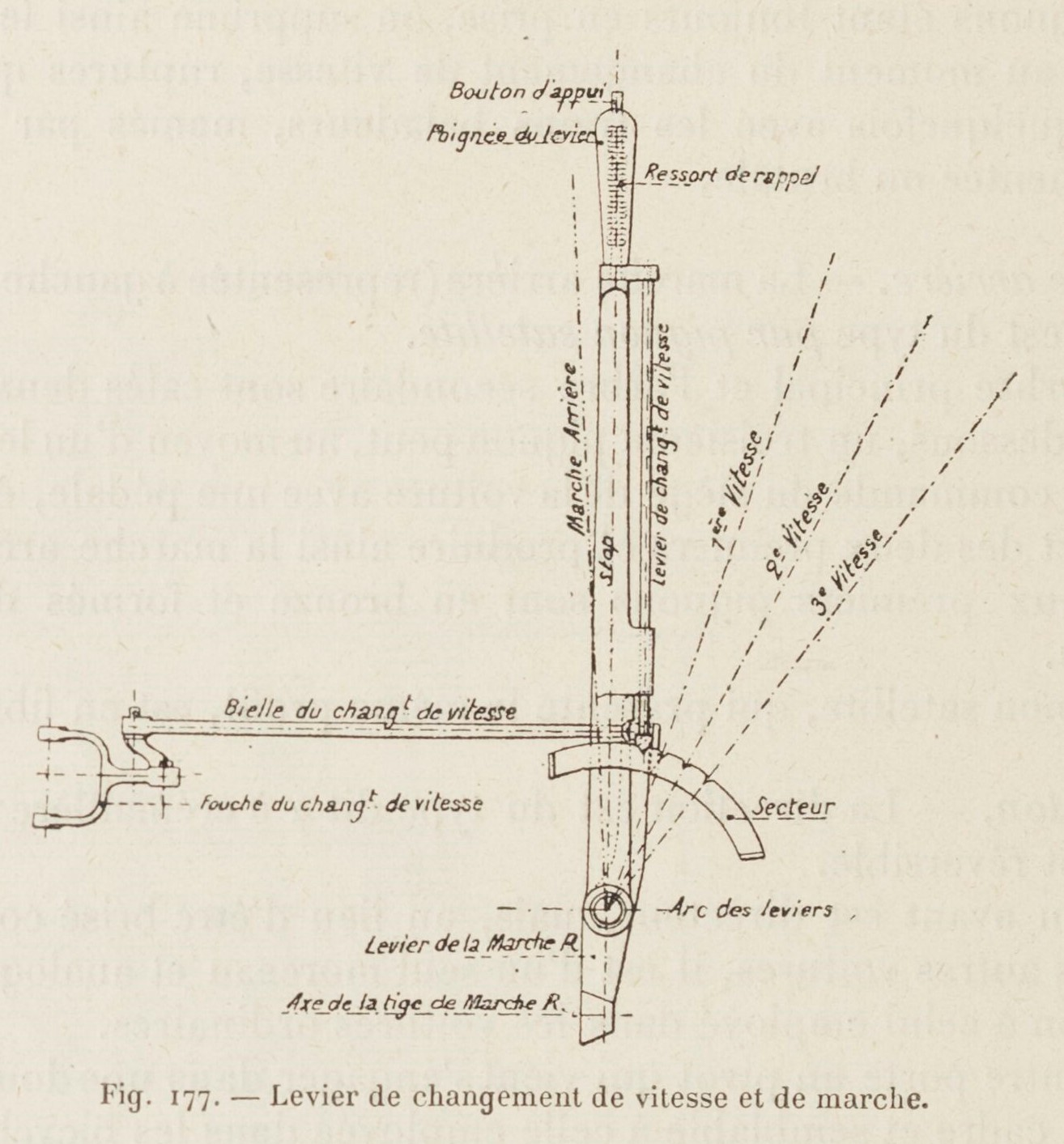
1900 – The VCP gearshift lever.

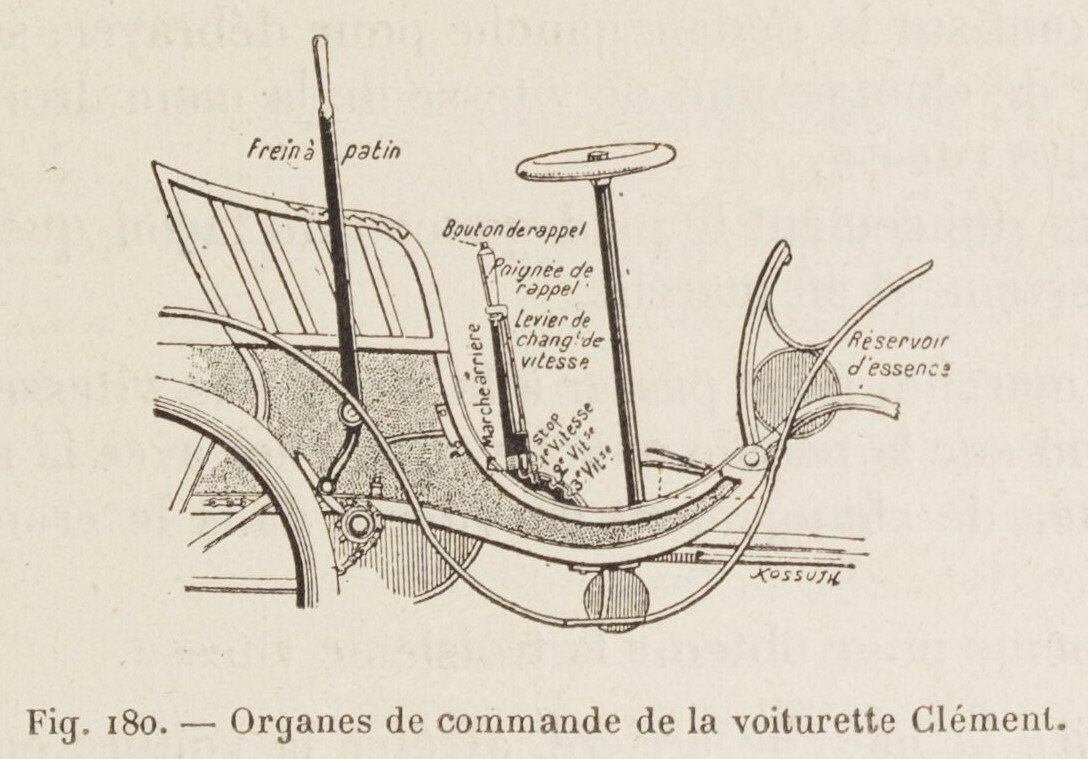
1900 – The VCP control devices.

Krebs developed the engine specifically for this vehicle. It is a single cylinder four-stroke engine with originally a bore of 90 mm, a stroke of 120 mm and a displacement of 763cc.

There is no accelerator pedal. The engine always gives its maximum power. At that time the accelerator pedal disengaged the regulator, which was not desirable for a public of beginners. The electric ignition will add a lot of smoothness to the ride (see below).

The engine body is cooled with air, the cylinder head with water. The ignition system consists originally of a burner and hot tube. With the jet carburetor, the engine runs on both petroleum and gasoline. It has 3.5 hp. In the vehicles from 1901, the engine has an output of 4.5 hp and more.

The engine is housed in the rear, standing with a slight backward tilt. The gearbox is a mechanical version of the constant mesh electromagnetic gearbox from A. C. Krebs' 1896 patent. A reverse gear was available from 1899.

=== Chassis and body ===
Steel tubing was welded for the chassis, allowing it to be kept light yet strong. The suspension consists of a front transverse leaf spring, which accommodates the vertical steering pin and rotates with the complete front axle when steering, and a pair of longitudinally arranged elliptic springs on the rear axle.

At first there was only a two-seater body as Phaeton. In 1900 variants were added that had a narrow rear-facing seat, making it a three-seater in a vis-à-vis arrangement.

The vehicle weighs 350 kg and 30 km/h is the maximum speed. The first bodies were made of the aluminum alloy called "Partinium".

=== Steering ===
The driver sits on the right and steers using a steering wheel. Instead of Ackermann steering A. C. Krebs chose center-pivot steering operated by a gear wheel at the lower end of the steering column and a rack. The device worked satisfactorily on this light and lightly motorized car.

=== Production ===
Estimates are from around 500 to around 600 vehicles produced. The first production car was given the engine number 101. Production may have officially ended in 1902, but it cannot be ruled out that a few more copies were made from existing parts by 1903.

Stirling Motor Carriages of Scotland manufactured about 200 vehicles ans sold them in many countries (see below).

== New VCP 1901 models ==
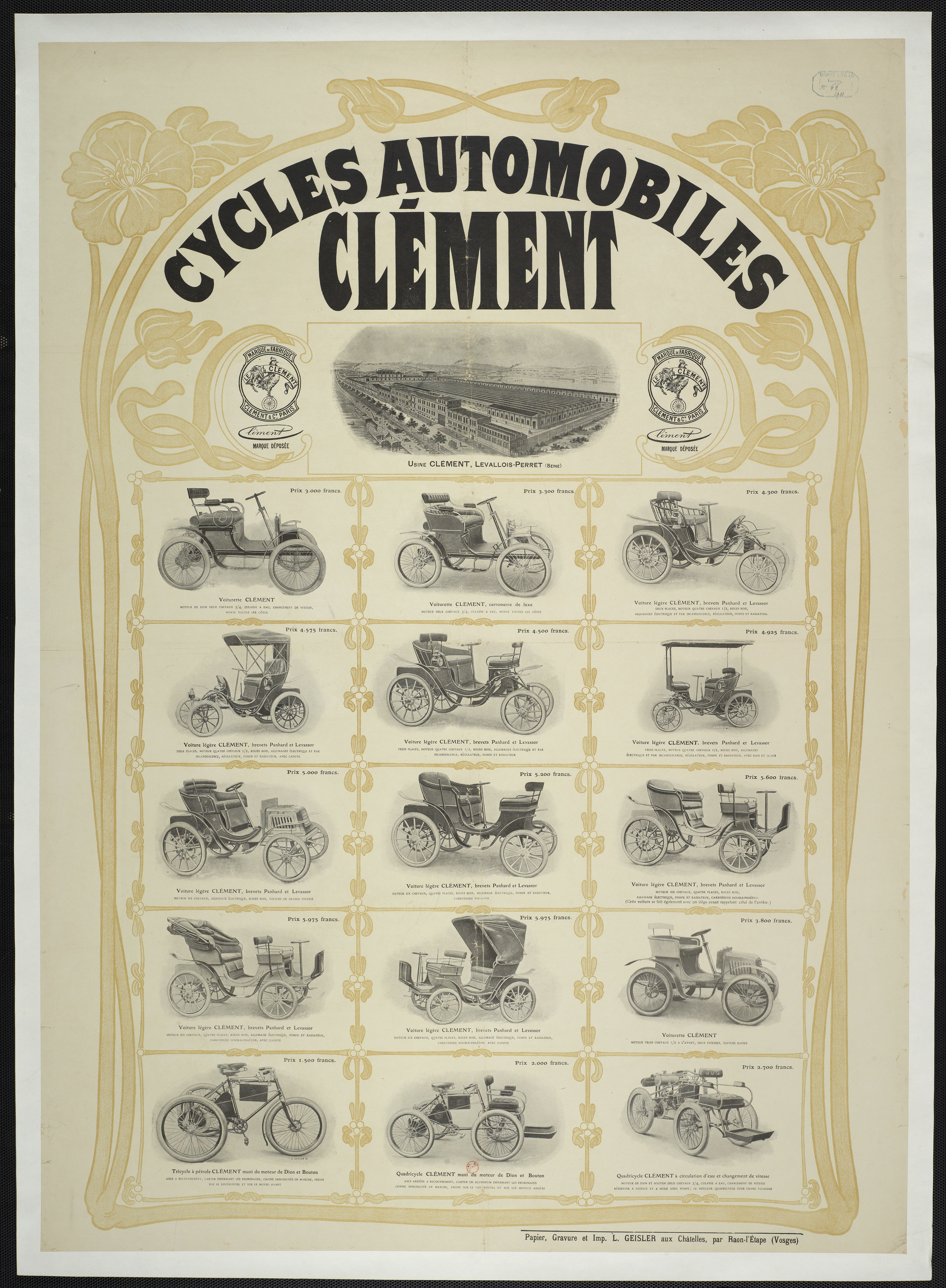
1901 – Cycles Automobiles Clément – advertisement for Clément-Panhard Cars.

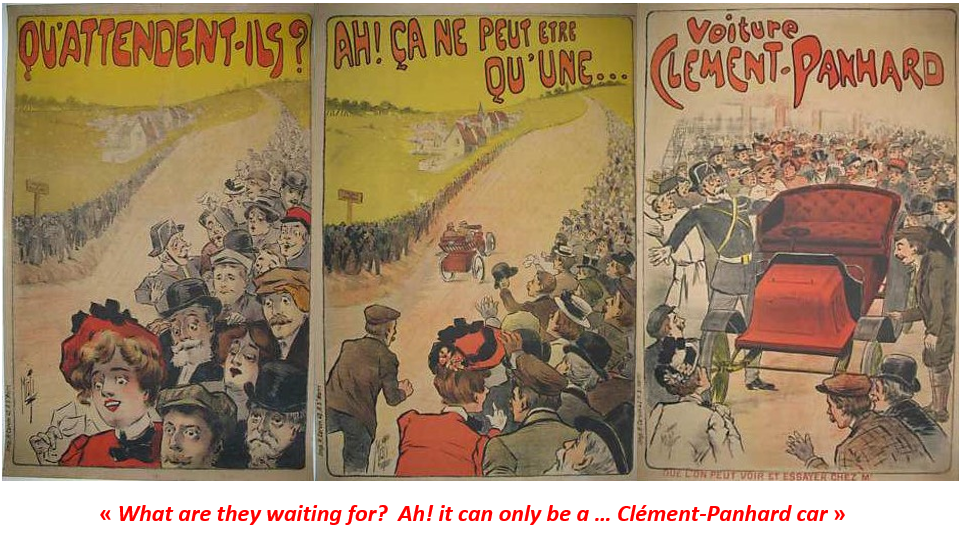
1901 – Advertising postcards for the Voiture Clément-Panhard (VCP): "What are they waiting for? Ah! it can only be a ... Clément-Panhard car".

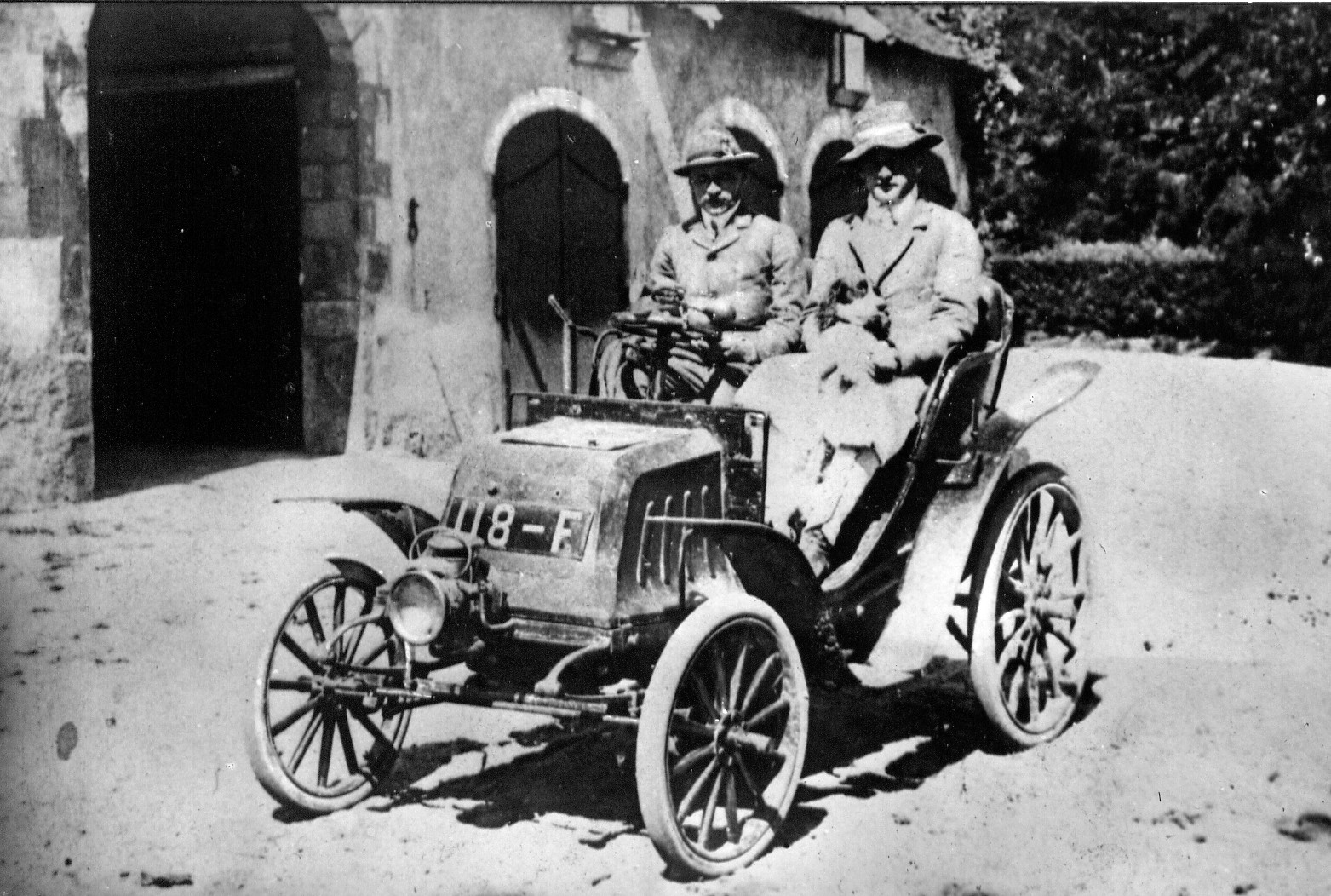
1902 – The Clément-Panhard new model: "6 horsepower engine, electric ignition, wooden wheels, high-speed car."

In 1901, new features were introduced in the VCPs:

- Both hot tube and electric ignition (from 1900):

The ignition advance lever makes it possible to obtain all the speeds between two speeds of the gear change by suitably varying the engine speed.

- A. C. Krebs irreversible worm gear steering and Ackermann system.
- Front suspension with two tweezer springs.
- Detachable gearbox locks

== The Stirlingmotor VCP models ==
From 1901 John Stirling buys Clément-Panhard chassis to sell them in many countries with his own bodies.

To prove the robustness of the Clément-Panhards, in July 1901 John Stirling broke the record for crossing the United Kingdom from John-O'-Groat's to Land's End in 59 hours and 15 minutes.

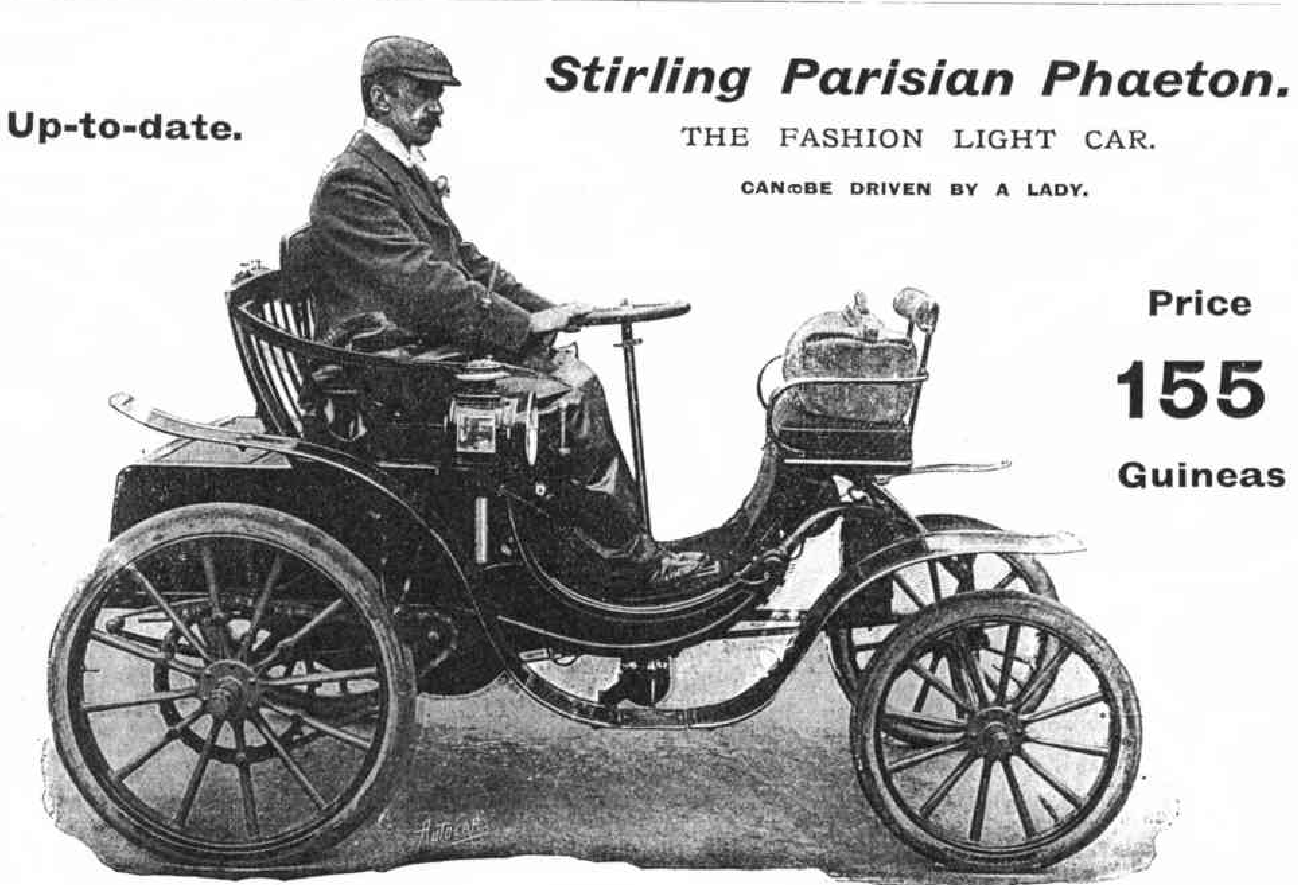
1901 – VCP Stirling: Parisian Phaeton.

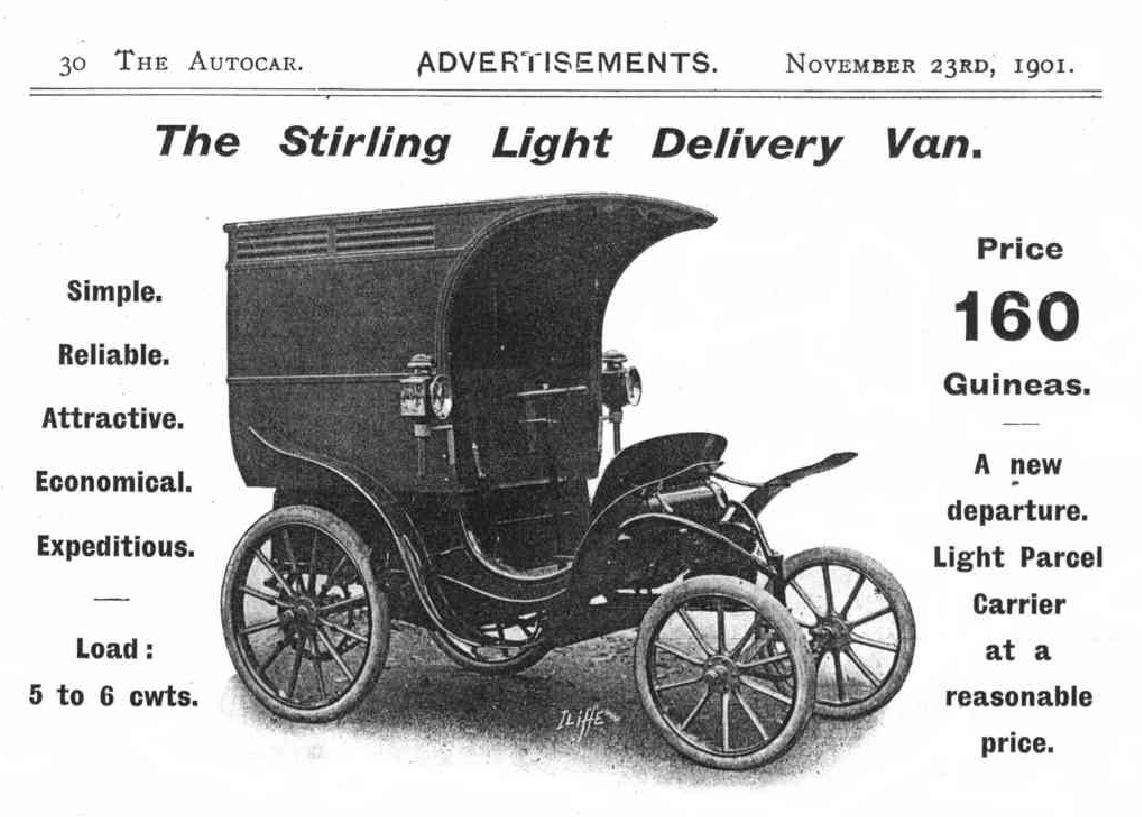
1901 – VCP Stirling: delivery van.

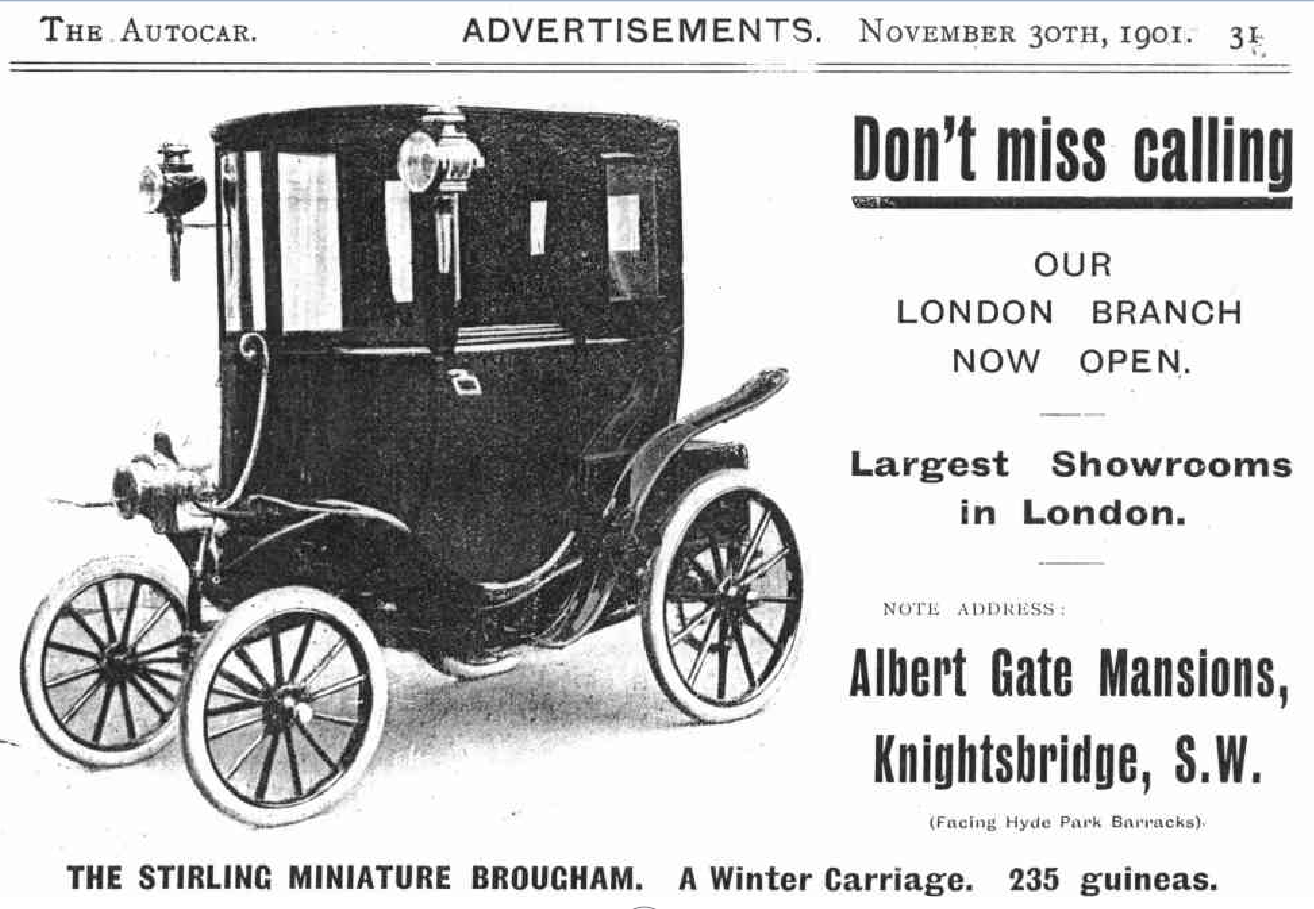
1901 – VCP Stirling: miniature brougham

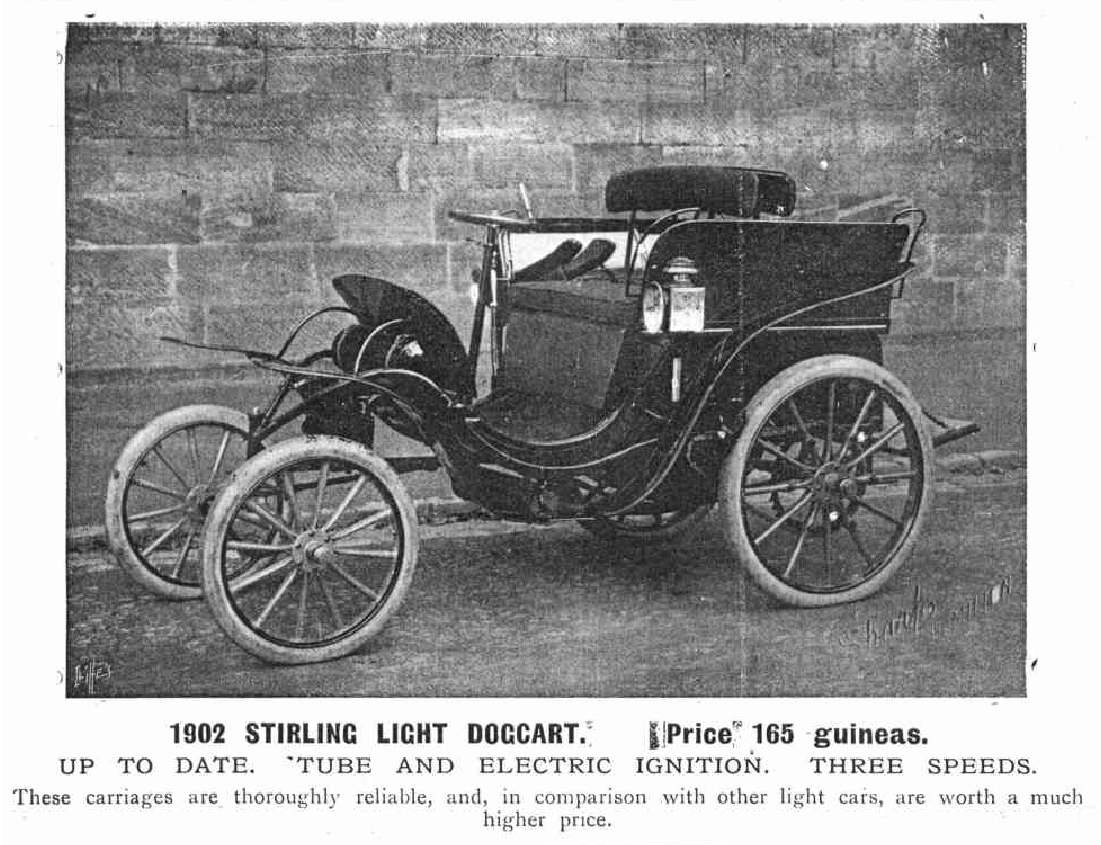
1901 – VCP Stirling: light dogcart.

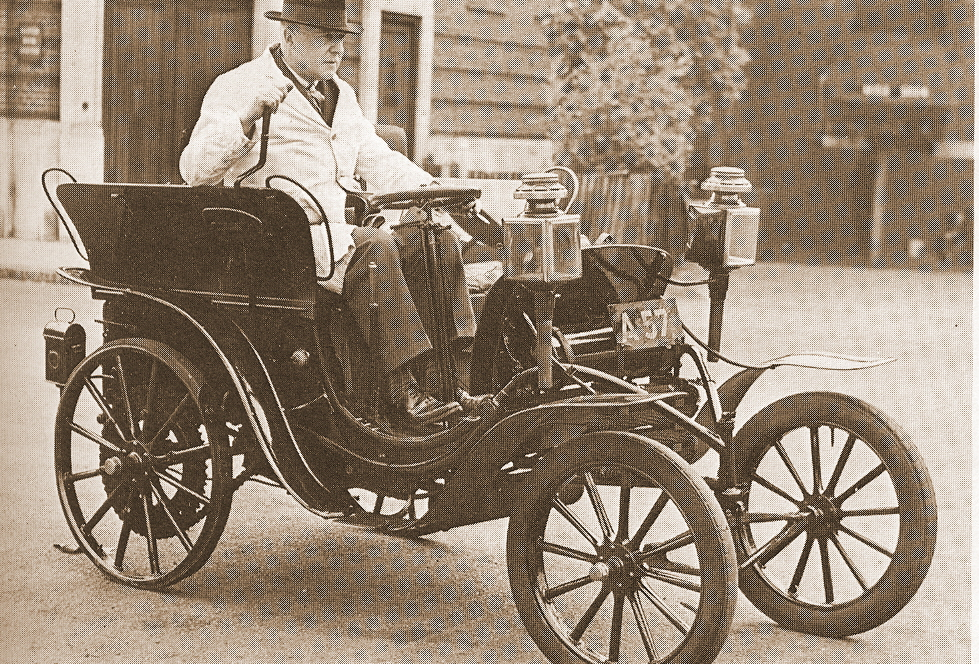
1901 - Stirling light dog-cart.

== The Clément autocycle with removable motor ==
1901 - At the autoshow, Clément presented an engine set that could be fitted to any bicycle. This engine is derived from the Krebs engine for the Clément-Panhard Car and is dependent on the Panhard & Levassor patents.

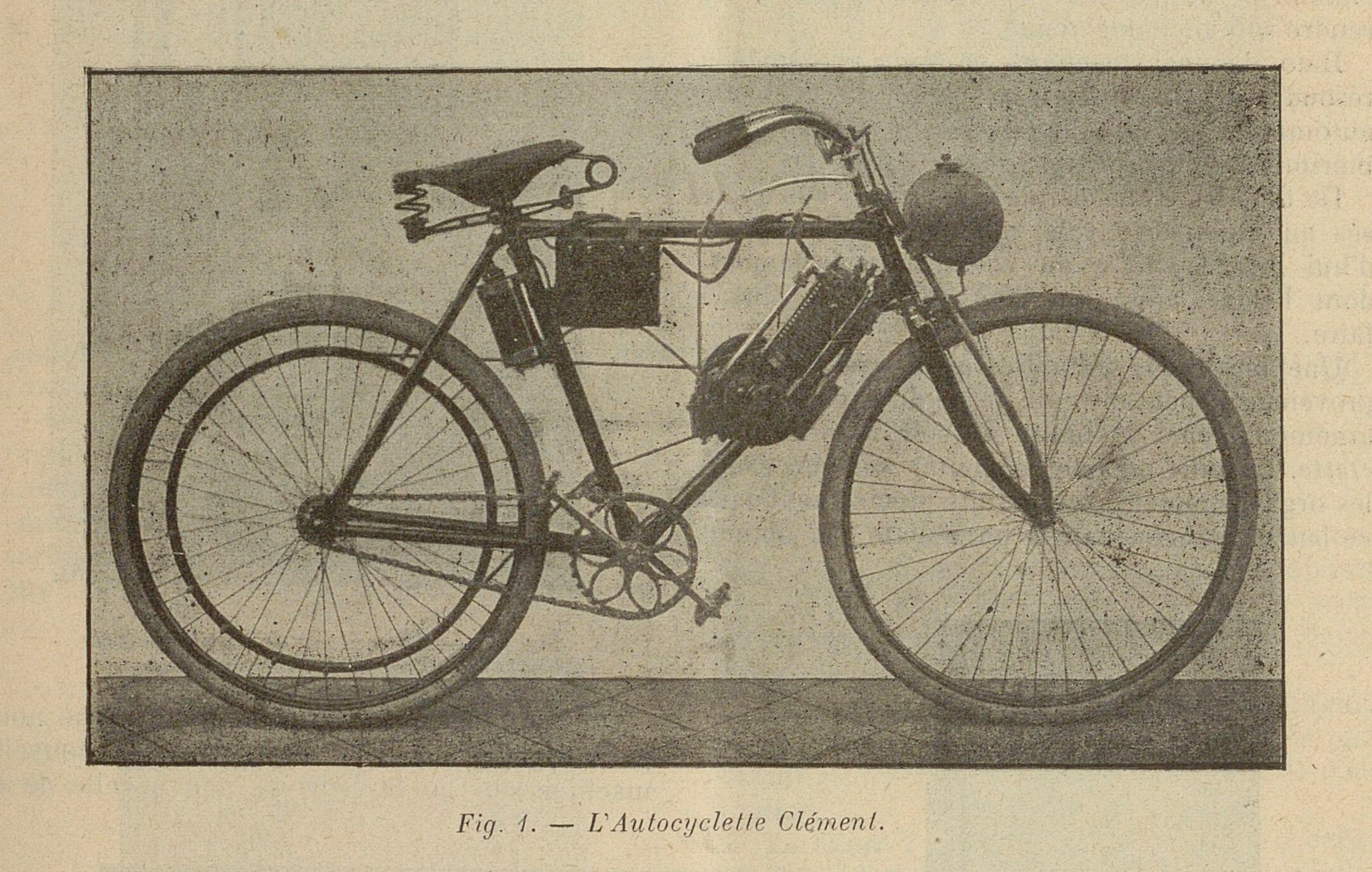
1901 - The Clément autocycle with the removable motor derived from the Krebs engine of the Clément-Panhard Car.

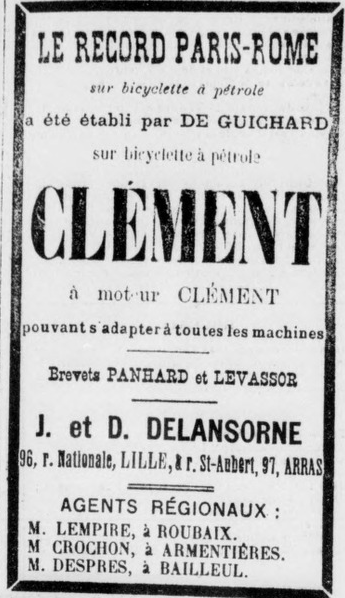
1901 - Advertisement for the Clément autocycle mentioning the dependence on the Panhard & Levassor patents of A. C. KREBS.

== Technological analogies between the VCP (1898) and the FORD N (1906) ==
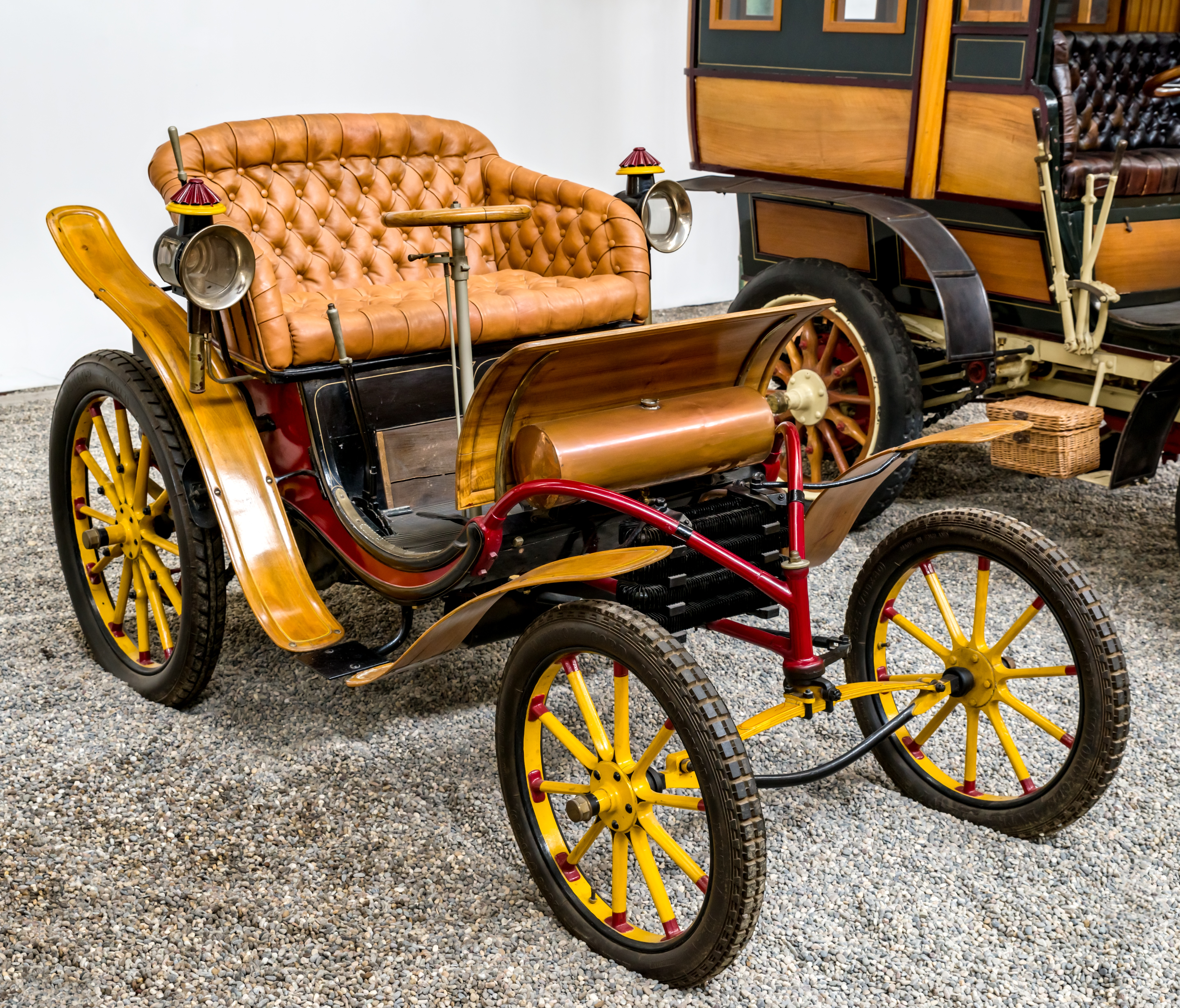
1900 - Clément-Panhard (VCP) Phaeton.

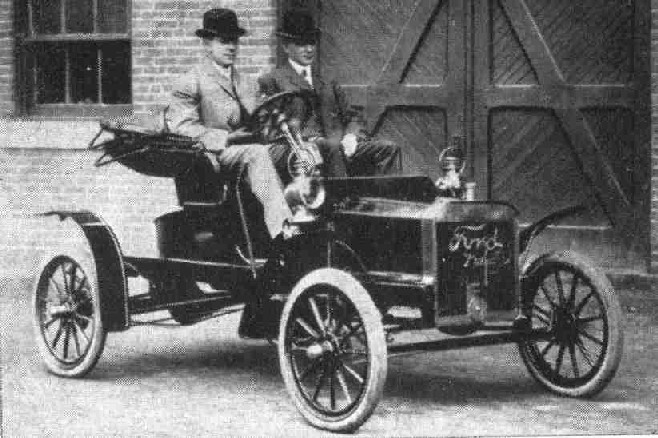
1906 - Ford model N.

It should be noted the many similarities in principle between the Clément-Panhard car of 1898 (see above) and the Ford model N of 1906, forerunner of the Ford model T:

- Intended for the general public;
- Solid and safe;
- Generalization of the suspension by 3 points and triangulations;
- Transverse spring on the front axle, so the VCP waddles as does the Ford T;
- A quasi-automatic gearbox etc.

Also the use of vanadium steel by Ford comes from a Panhard & Levassor racing car that crashed during a race in America.

== The surviving and famous VCP cars ==
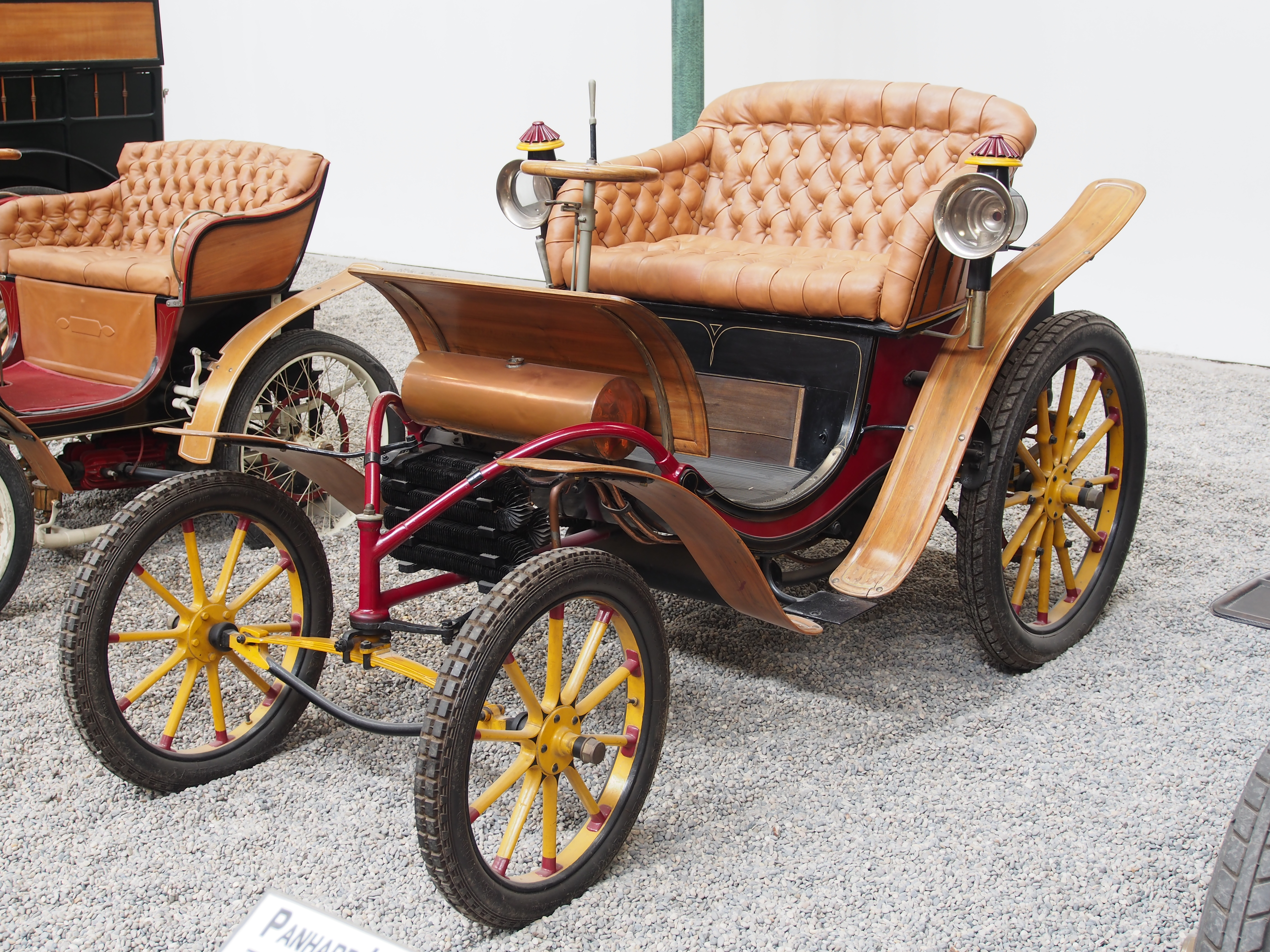
Side view of the 1900 Clément-Panhard Phaeton (VCP), 765cc 3,5cv, achieving a top speed of 35kmh.

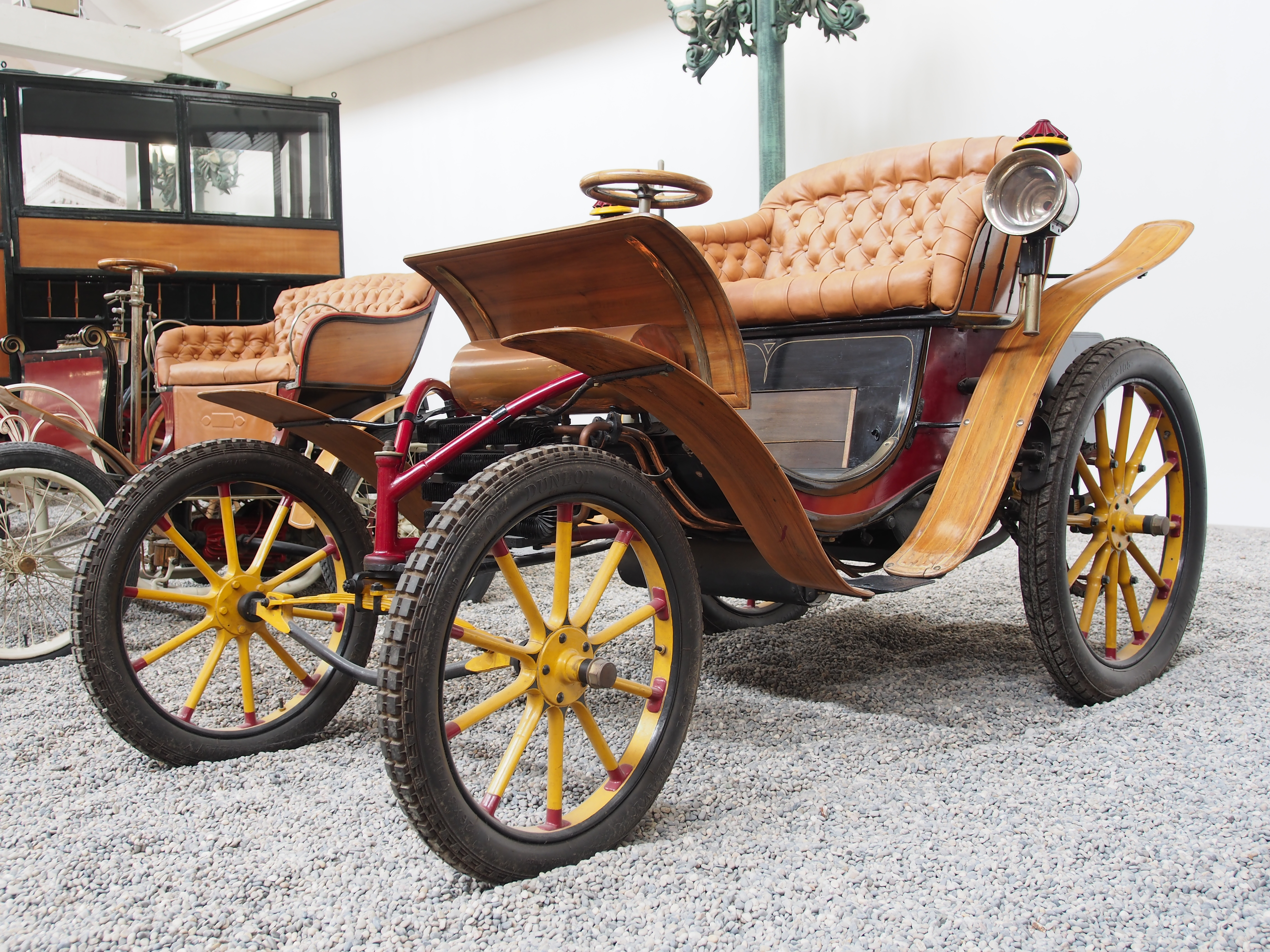
The 1900 Clément-Panhard Phaeton (VCP).

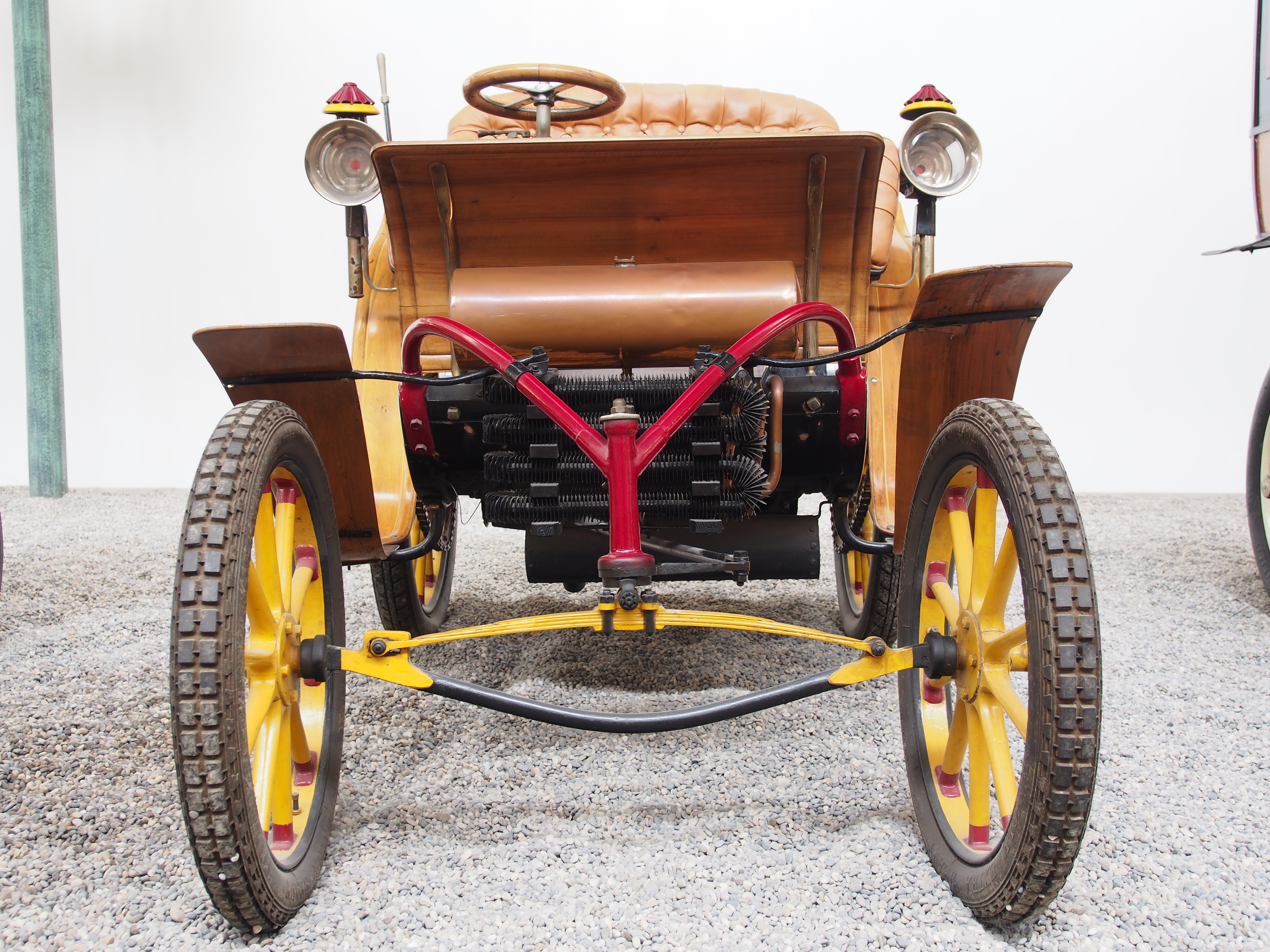
Front view of the 1900 Clément-Panhard Phaeton (VCP).

According to a website specializing in this model, 17 vehicles still exist.

specified year of construction	Exhibition place	Chassis no.	engine no.	Vehicle UK registration number	Picture
1899	Sparreholms Motormuseum; Sparreholm, Sweden	141	195	IY 45	This car was the third car in Ireland.
1899	United Kingdom	210	201	V 46	This car 'won' the 1927 London to Brighton driven by John Bryce.
1899	United Kingdom		171	PX 98	This car was part of the French collection of Henri Malartre displayed at the Chateau de Rochetaillée near Lyon (France).
1899	Museo Nazionale dell'Automobile; Turin, Italy		260		Clement-Panhard 3 HP, 1899
1900	United Kingdom	244	356	AH 48	This car was owned by André de NEVE from the 1930s to 1950s. M. NEVE was a former President of the Teuf Teuf club in France and he was often seen with his car at morning events in Paris including the Course de Côte Automobile in Montmartre.
1900	United Kingdom	366	166	FX 149	Has been in the Norwood family since 1970.
1900	United Kingdom	238	238	BS 8237	Rebuilt by Arthur Livingstone in the UK in the 1980s.
1900	James Hall Transport Museum in La Rochelle, Johannesburg, South Africa	328	328		It took part in the 1928 Emancipation Run and finished with an average speed of 22 kph.
19xx	Riverside Museum; Glasgow, Scotland	539	419	HD 68	"Josephine" was discovered in the early 1930s and took part in the 1938 Brighton Run.
1900	Cité de l'Automobile; Mulhouse, France		469		
1901	France		448	A 57	This Stirling-Panhard was owned by G. James Allday, President of VCC of Great Britain (1946–1954) who loaned it to the Beaulieu Motor Museum, England.
1901	Netherlands				Took part in the 1966 London to Brighton Run (#56), the entrant was Mr. A. Janssen from Holland.
1902	Museums Collections Centre; Birmingham, England			O 65	
1900	United Kingdom	577	462	BS 8010	From 1972 to 2003 the car was in the Lips Autotron an automobile museum in Drunen and later Rosmalen.
1900	Alsace, France		264	11 ZT 67	Mr. Reithoffer restored a Clément-Panhard that he acquired as a wreck in 1989. thumb
1900	Museu da Misericórdia; Salvador, Brazil		475		The oldest car in Brazil and was still taking part is rallies in Salvador until recently.
1900	Tallinn, Estonia				In 1902, Captain Fiodorov bought a Clément-Panhard car in Saint Petersburg, thus becoming the first oil-powered automobile in Estonia. Here racing driver Julius Johanson is driving this car.
1901			313		From the 1940s this car was in the Lindley Bothwell collection in the US.
1900	Palma de Mallorca, Spain			PM1	First car to be registered in Spain in Palma de Mallorca with the registration PM1.
?			581		Engine only: discovered in a barn in Southern England in 2011. A whole car has now been built around this engine.
1901					1901 Model.
1901					1901 Model in blue: Front, Rear.

== Documentation ==
- Bernard Vermeylen: Panhard & Levassor: Entre tradition et modernité. E-T-A-I, Boulogne-Billancourt 2005, ISBN 2-7268-9406-2.
