= L'Œuf électrique =

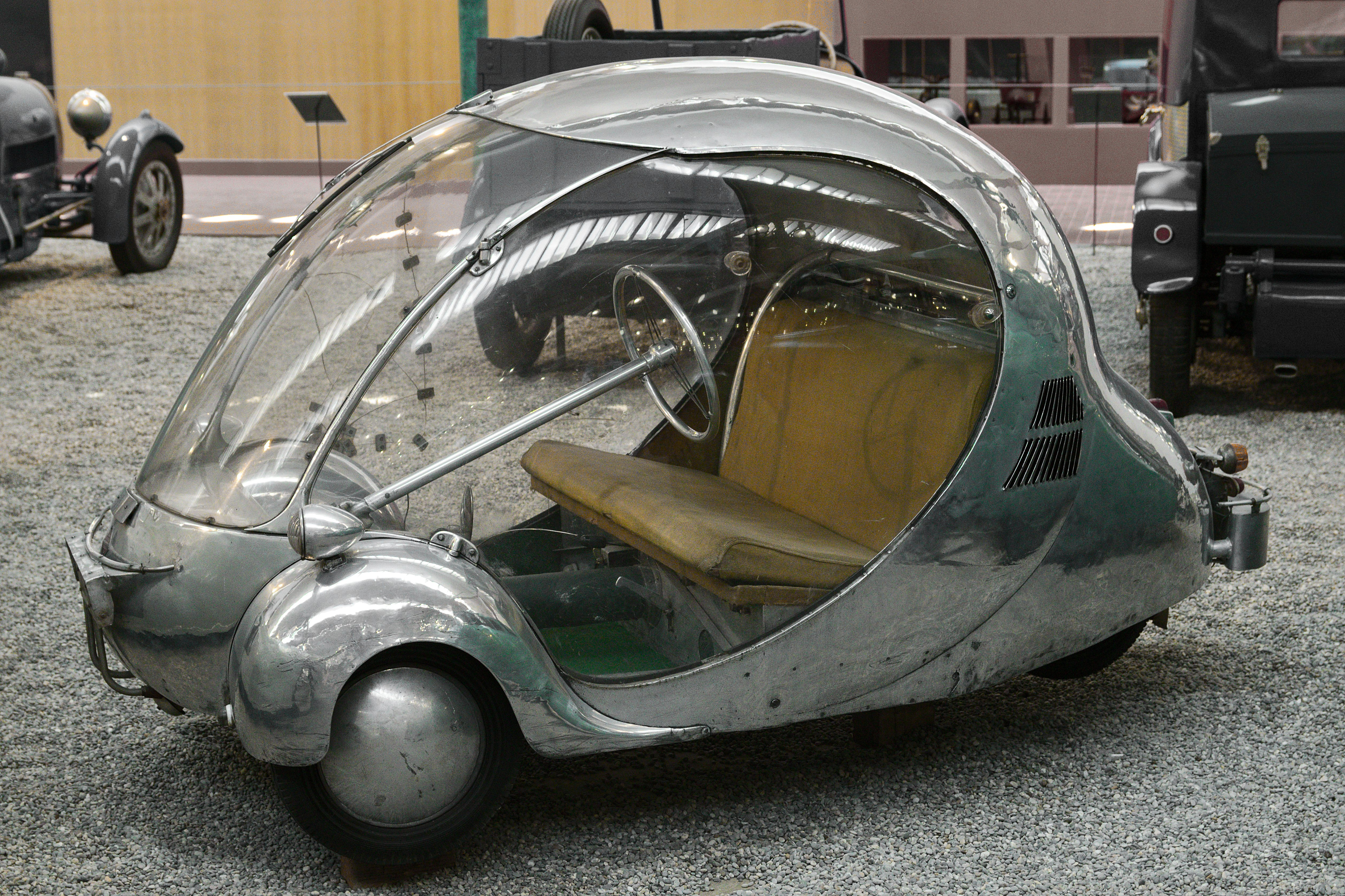

Overview
- Designer: Paul Arzens

Body and chassis
- Class: Concept car

Powertrain
- Propulsion: Electric
- Electric range: 100 km

Dimensions
- Curb weight: 350 kg

L'Œuf électrique (transl. The Electric Egg) was a futuristic prototype concept electric cyclecar designed in 1938, and built in 1942 by industrial designer Paul Arzens (1903-1990). It was acquired by the Musée des Arts et Métiers in Paris in 1993, and is currently at the Cité de l'Automobile in Mulhouse in Alsace.

== History ==
Arzens, a Parisian, and graduate of École nationale supérieure des Beaux-Arts de Paris, designed this futuristic, economical, lightweight electric car prototype in 1938 (along with his concept car La Baleine), then built it in 1942, during World War II.

=== Car ===
The spherical bodywork, with a fastback rear, is inspired by interwar cyclecars, and the organic shapes of an egg, a bubble, or a drop of water. The body is aluminum, over a chassis formed from a Duralinox tube. The windscreen and doors are made of curved acrylic. Batteries account for most of the car's 350-kilogram (770 lb) weight.

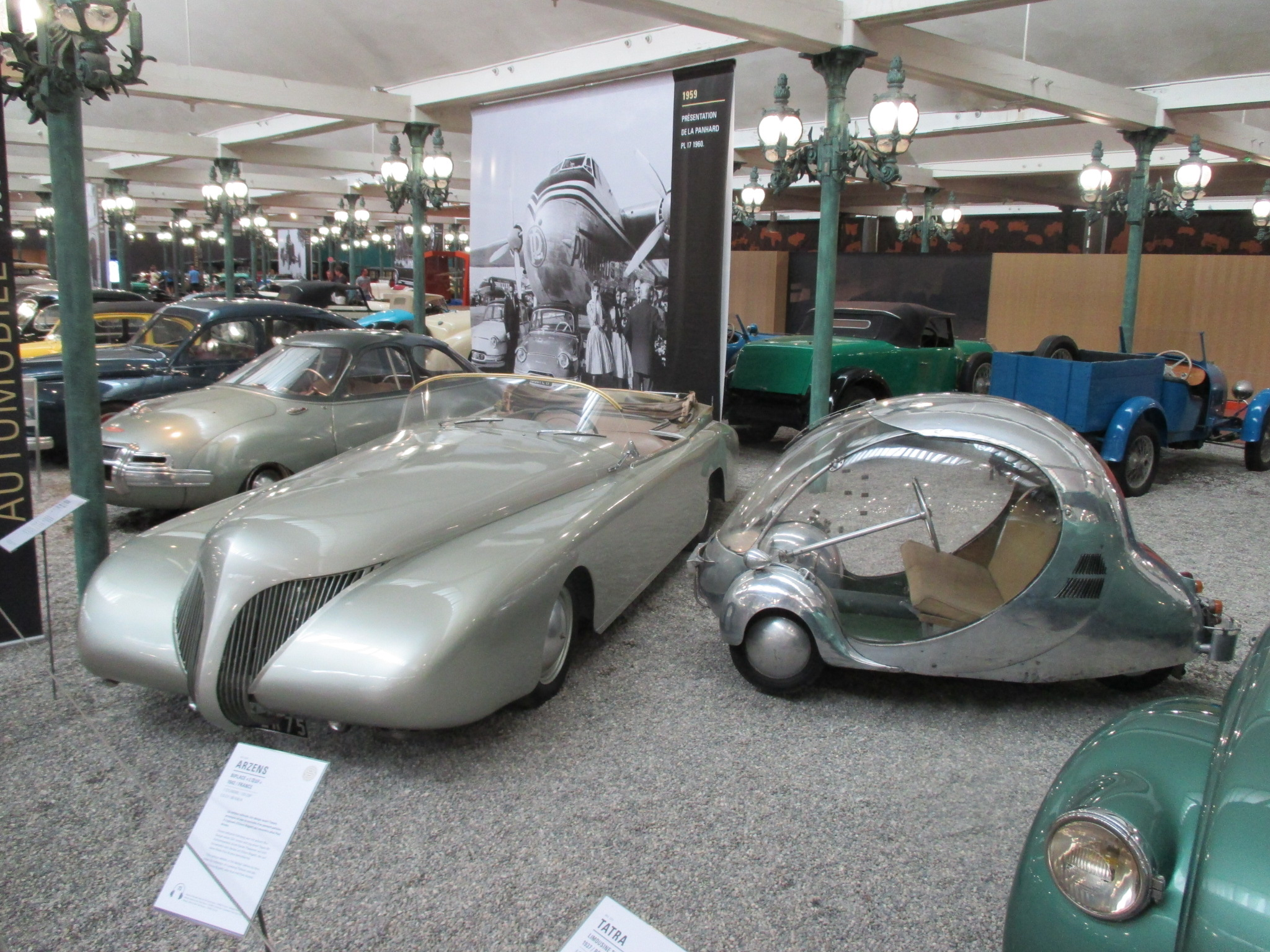
Near La Baleine

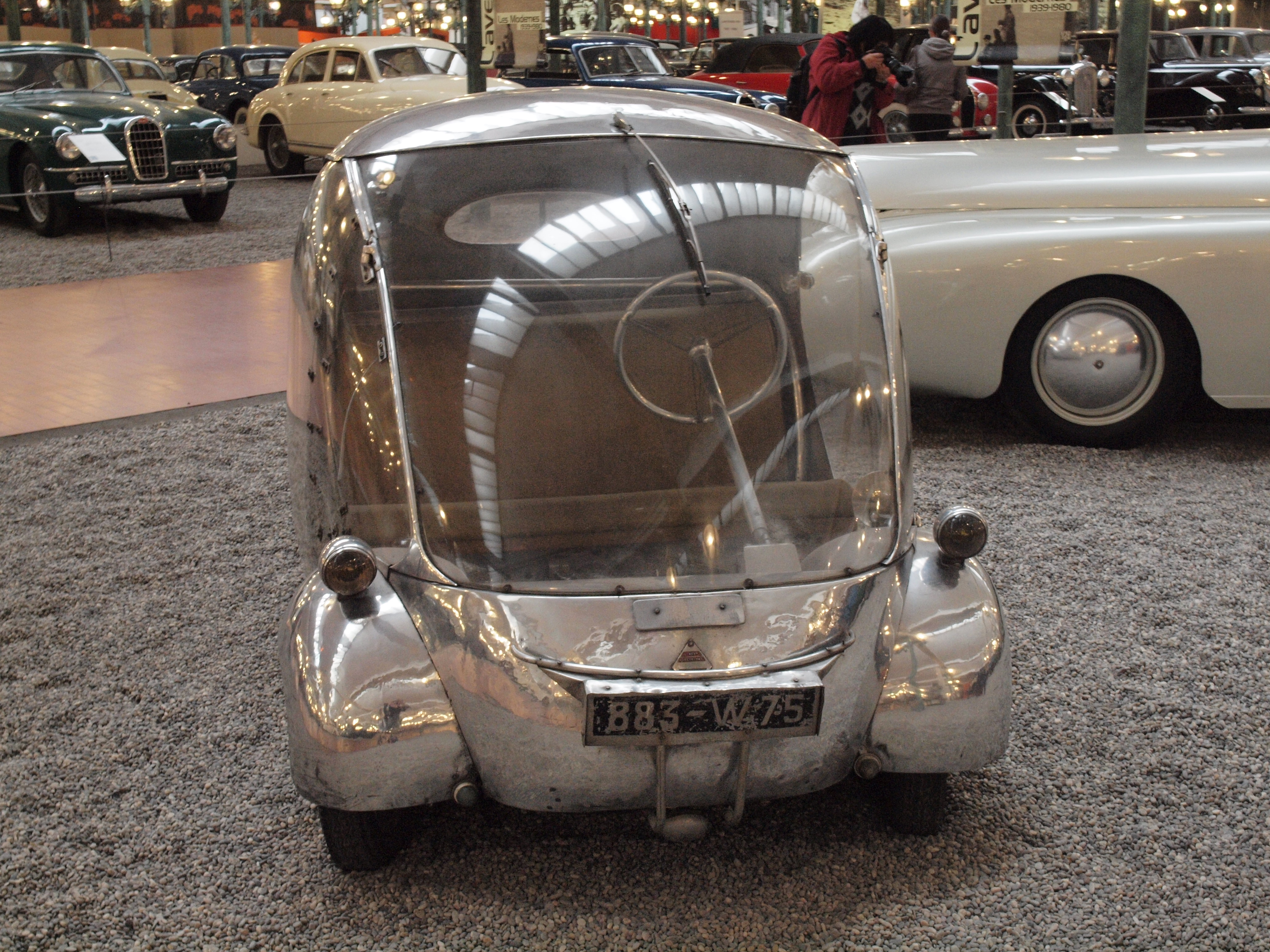
Face view

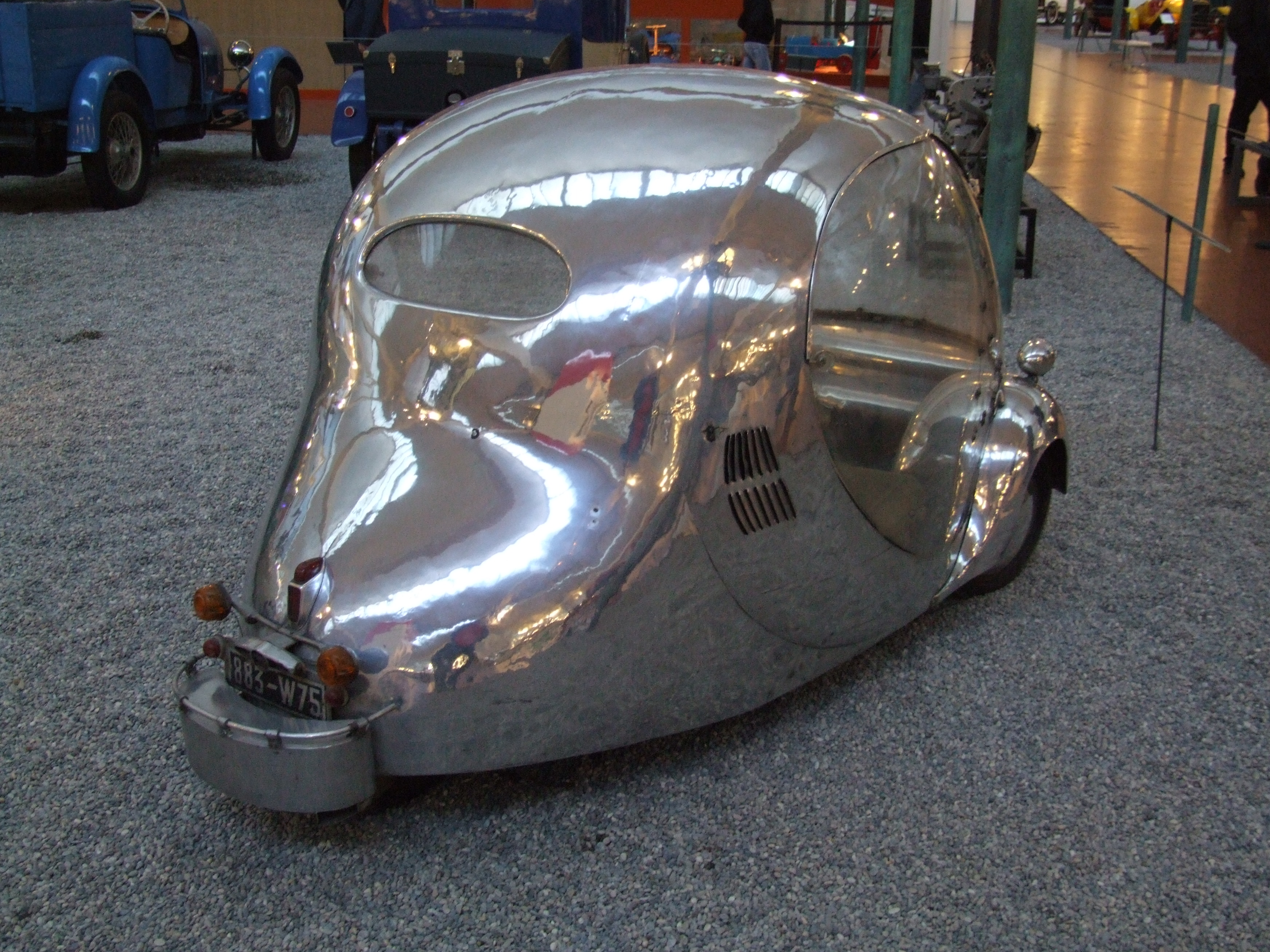
Side view

=== Motorisation ===
To circumvent fuel rationing during the German military administration in occupied France during World War II, Arzens used an electric motor, which was powered by five 12-volt batteries located under the bench seat. Each battery had a capacity of 250 ampere hours, and weighed 60 kilograms (130 lb). The car had a top speed of 70 kilometres per hour (43 mph), and a range of 100 kilometres (62 mi).

After the war, Arzens replaced the electric motor with a 125 cc (7.6 cu in) Peugeot single-cylinder petrol engine, which produced 5.5 horsepower (4.1 kW). This resulted in an increase in the car's top speed, to 80 kilometres per hour (50 mph).

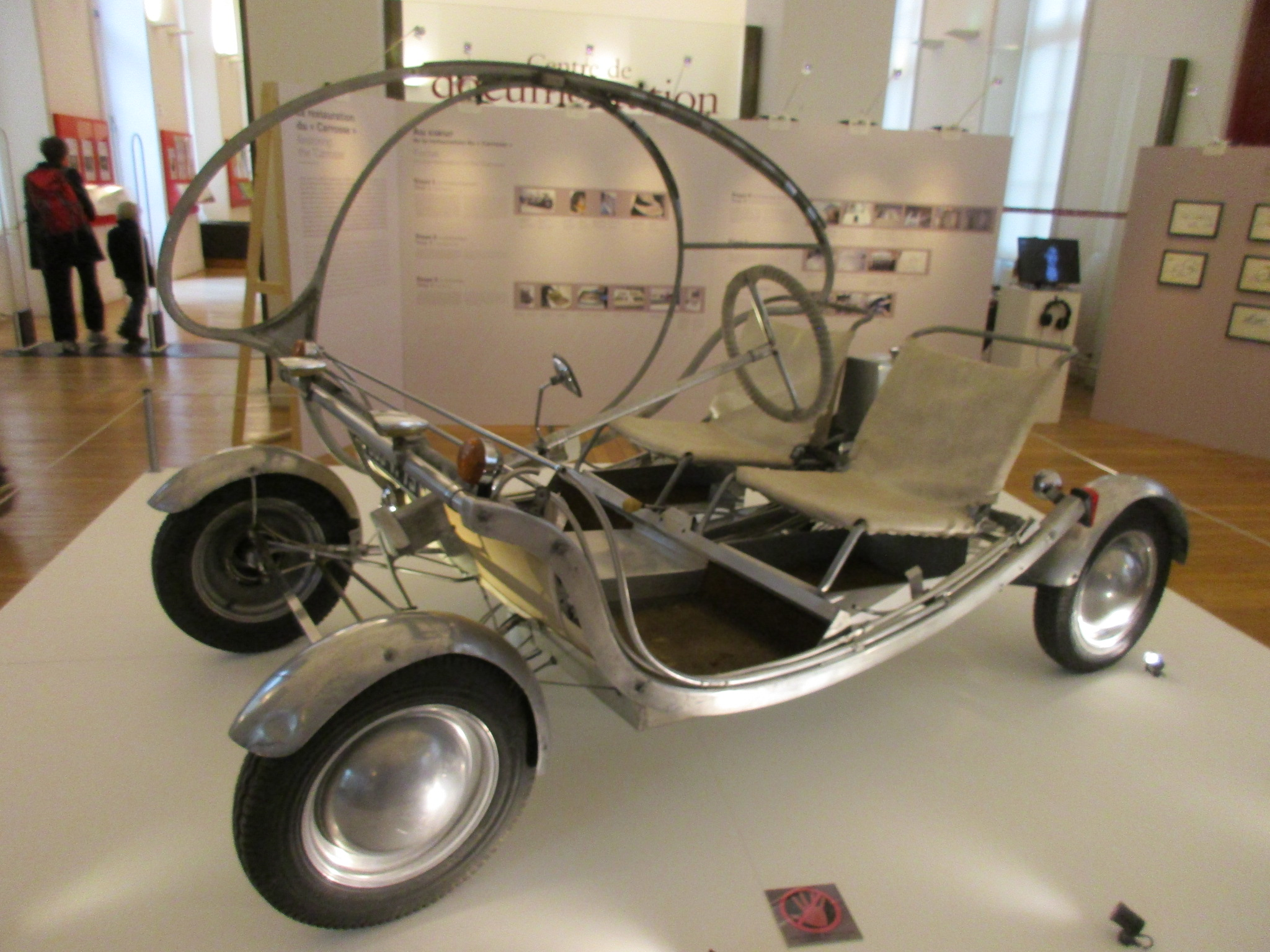
Le Carrosse, variant of 1951, in the musée des Arts et Métiers in Paris

== Museum ==
Arzens used L'Œuf électrique as his personal car until his death in 1990, at which point it was donated to the Musée des Arts et Métiers in Paris, which houses the collection of the Conservatoire national des arts et métiers. As of 2022, the car is at the Cité de l'Automobile in Mulhouse, together with La Baleine.
