= Paul Arzens =

French industrial designer (1903–1990)

- Paul Arzens in his "L'Œuf électrique" in front of the Eiffel tower, 1942
- Born: 28 August 1903
- Died: 2 February 1990 (aged 86)
- Citizenship: France
- Occupation: Industrial designer

Paul Arzens (28 August 1903 – 2 February 1990) was a French industrial designer of railway locomotives and motor cars.

Arzens was born in Paris, at an address along the Boulevard des Batignolles on the northern side of the city. As a young man he studied at the École des Beaux-Arts and soon gained recognition as a talented artist able at this stage, unusually, to live reasonably well on the sales proceeds from his paintings. This gave him enough time to pursue other interests in the realms of engineering and design. As his life progressed he accumulated a large collection of his own paintings and gained a reputation for an acute reluctance to sell any.

== Cars ==
In 1935, Arzens turned his interests to automobile engineering. He designed and constructed a six-speed automatic transmission that he installed in an old Chrysler and which worked. Robert Peugeot tried the car and was impressed, although hopes that the system might be adopted for the Peugeot 402 came to nothing, possibly because Peugeot had recently signed a deal with Cotal involving their pre-selector transmission.

Two years later, Arzens came up with an eye-catching and streamlined two-seater cabriolet prototype body built around the chassis of an old Buick. The car was christened "La Baleine" (the whale). With its integrated headlights, panoramic curved windscreen (of "plexiglas") and proto-ponton format styling, the design anticipated sports cars of the 1950s and 1960s. The car subsequently joined the Bugattis of the Schlumpf Collection at what has become the National Motor Museum in Mulhouse.

Two years later, following the German invasion, and the virtual disappearance of petrol for civilian use, Arzens came up with a second Baleine, closely resembling the first at least from the outside, but based on the chassis of an old Fiat - much lighter than a Buick - and encumbered by 1,100 kg of accumulator batteries. This was an electric vehicle with a claimed 10 hp providing a range of more than 200 km (125 miles) at 65/70 km/h (approx 40 mph).

Arzens' next automotive one-off appeared in 1942 and was instantly christened "L'Œuf électrique" (Electric egg), reflecting its egg-shape. Other eye catching features were the tiny wheels and the high proportion of the bodywork formed of curved transparent plexiglas. The body itself weighed just 60 kg, although adding the electric rear mounted motor raised this to 90 kg. Once batteries were added the vehicle weight was increased to 350 kg, allowing for a range of 100 km (63 miles) at 70 km/h (44 mph) or at 60 km/h 37 mph if two people were on board.

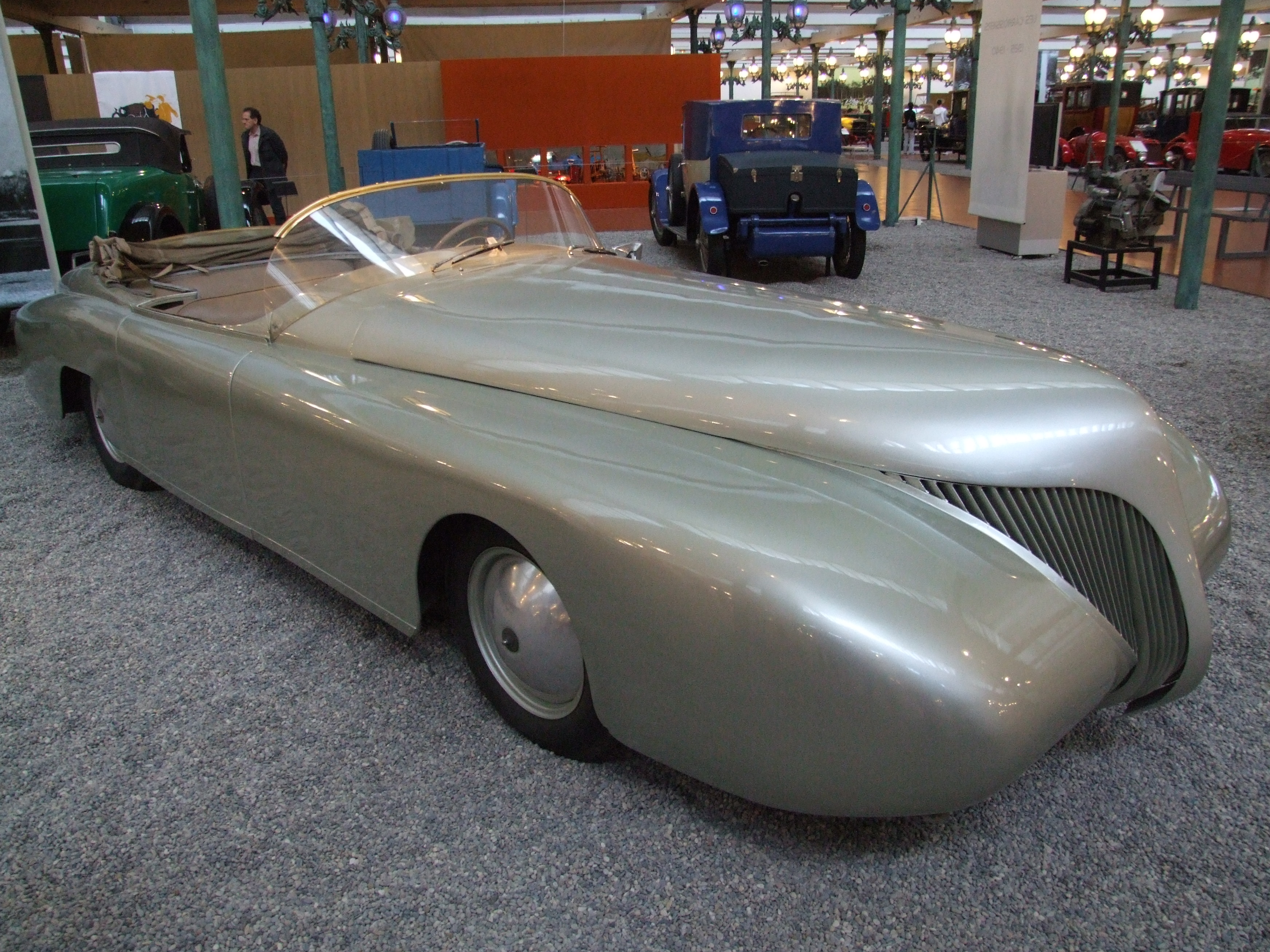
La Baleine, 1938, 3500 ccm, 160 km/h, Cité de l'Automobile, Mulhouse

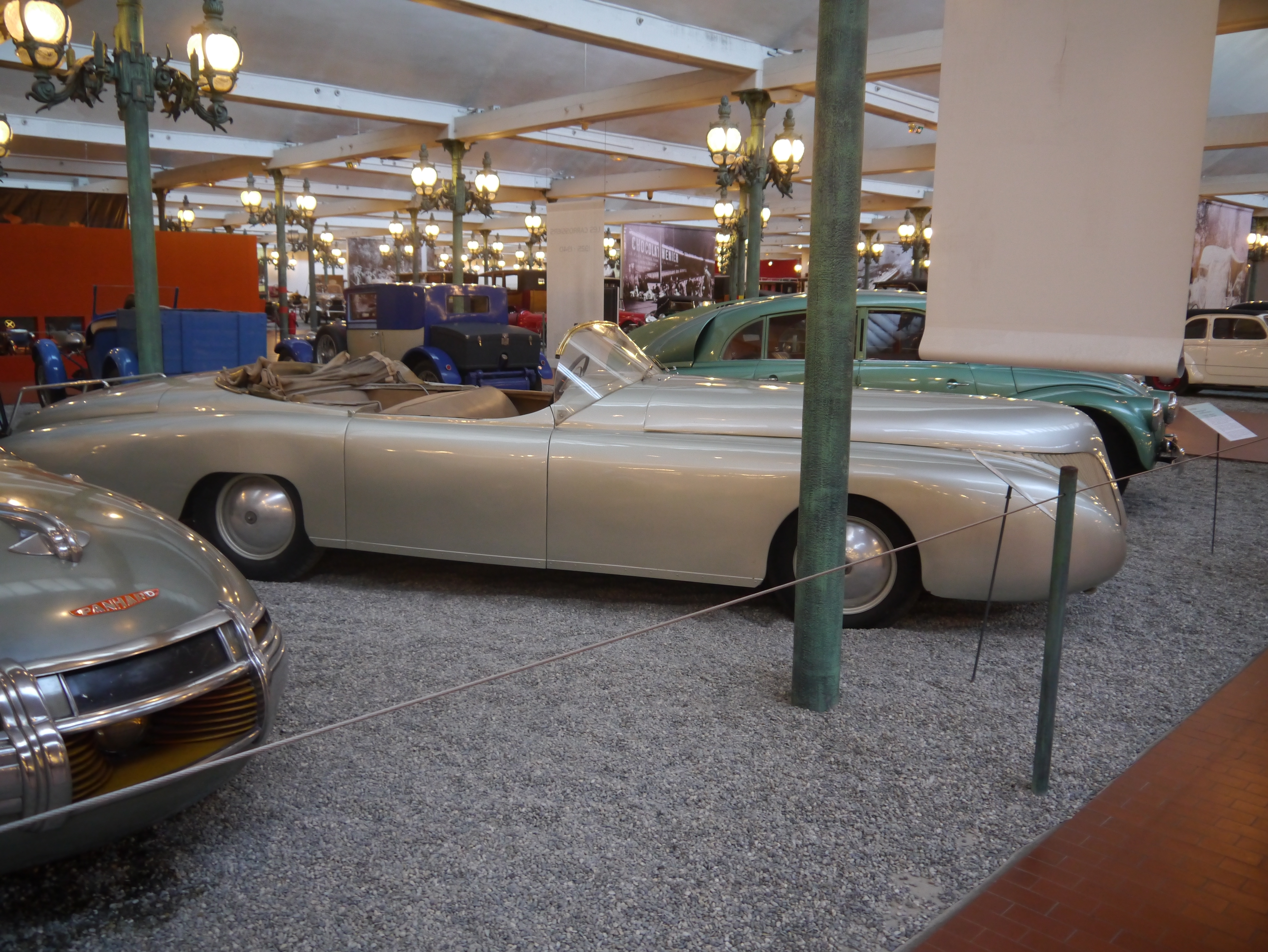
La Baleine

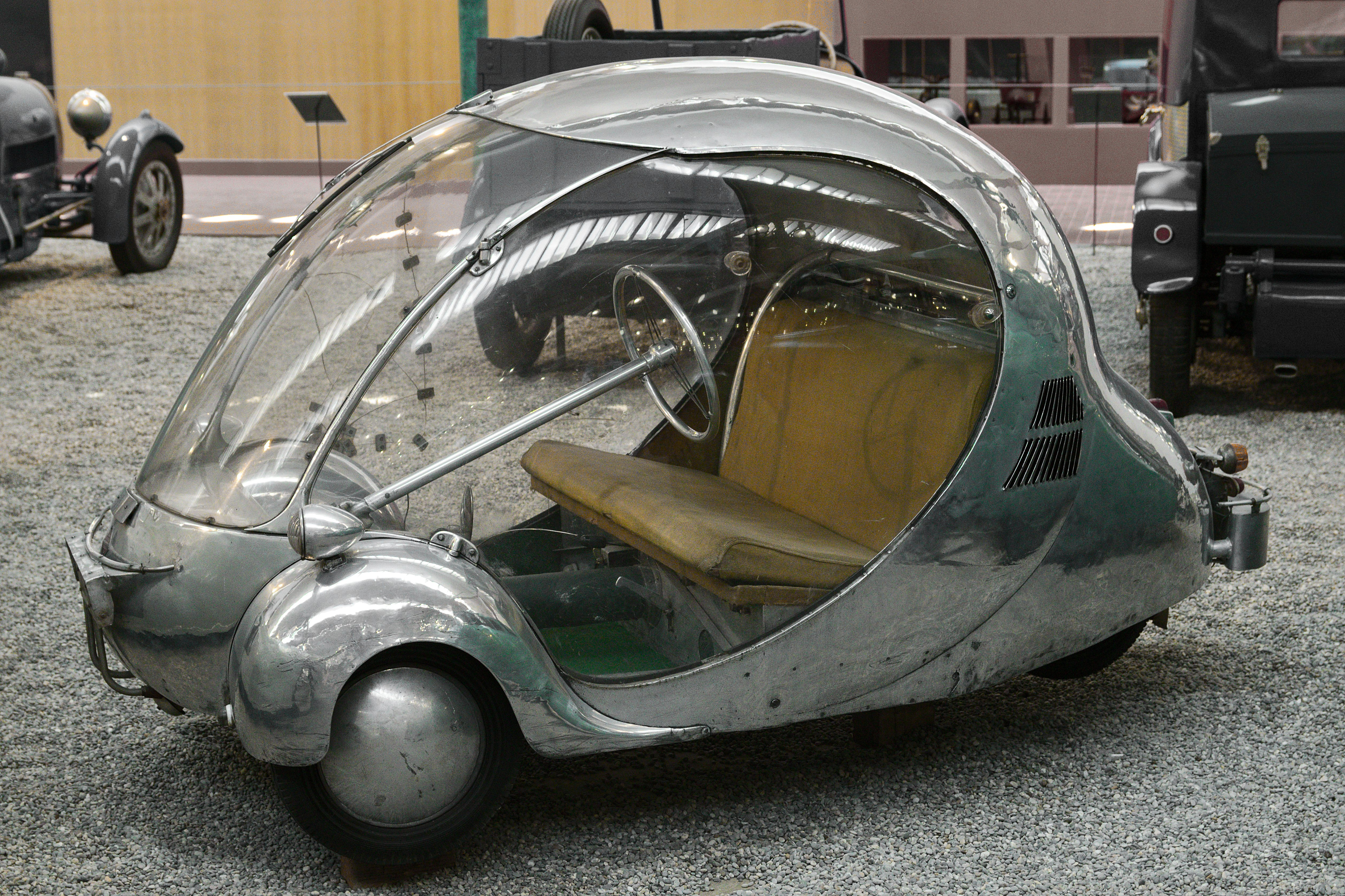
L'Œuf électrique, 1942, a sphere of plexiglas mounted on aluminum

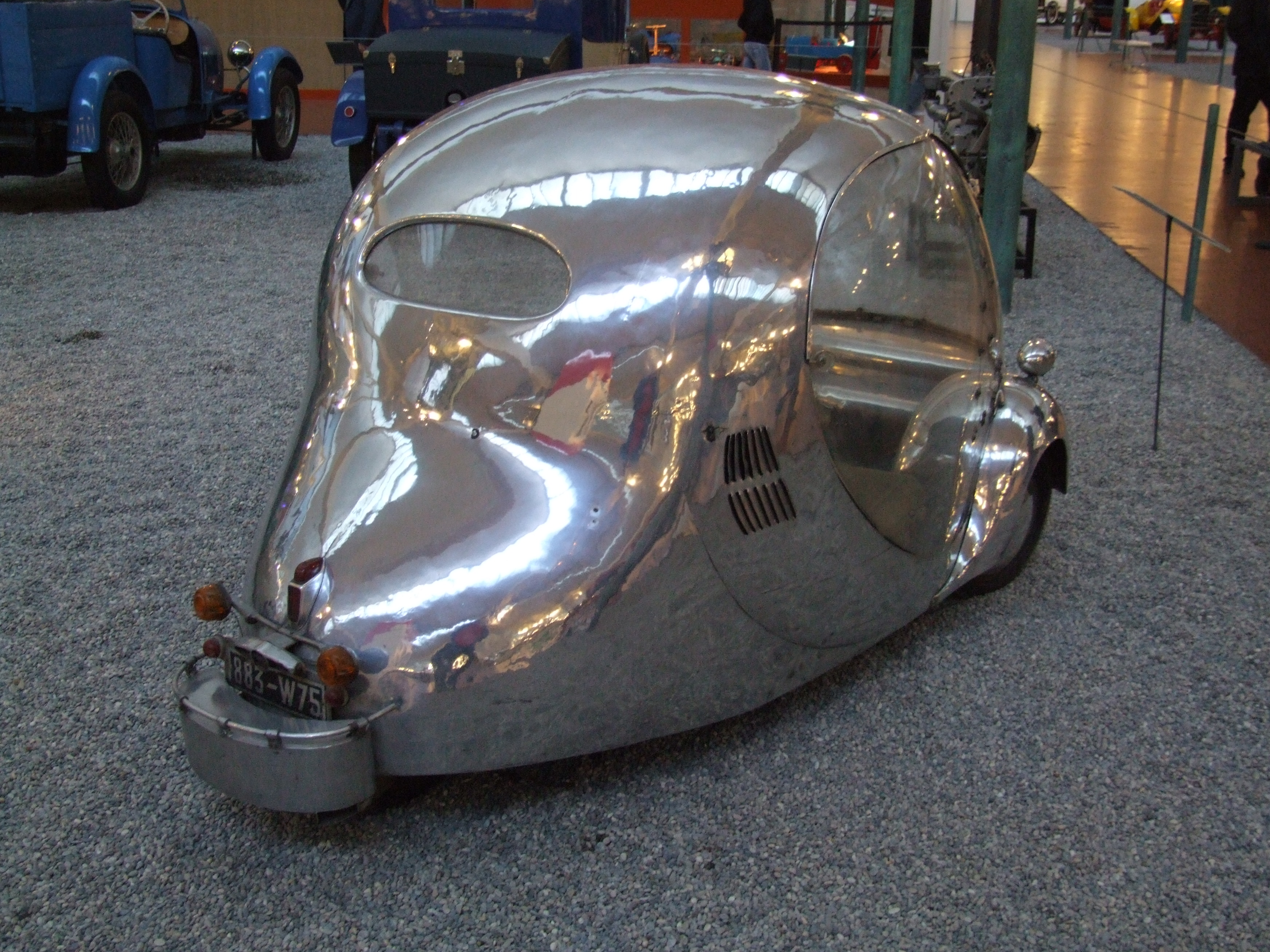
L'Œuf électrique from behind

== Plane ==
In 1944, Paul Arzens converted a Boeing B-17 Flying Fortress bomber into a VIP transport plane. General Eisenhower, Chief of Staff of the Allied forces in Europe, had the aircraft donated to General Koenig, then military governor of Paris. With the help of workers from the aircraft manufacturer Caudron, Arzens started by removing three tons of armament and armor from the aircraft and replacing the nose of the aircraft and the rear turret with more aerodynamic plexiglas profiles. In the fuselage, he installed a bedroom with two sofas, a living-dining room with four folding tables and twelve seats. The divans were made using car seat fabric. A telephone connected the living room to the cockpit. General Koenig made several trips to Morocco and Algeria with the plane, then handed it over to the French ambassador in Germany. Damaged during a landing, the plane was taken into account by the National Geographic Institute, brought back to France and repaired, but it was scrapped a few months later because the IGN already had about fifteen B-17s, more than it needed for its work.

== Rail locomotives ==
In 1947 Paul Arzens was placed on the payroll of the French National Railway Company (SNCF) and his first commission for them dates from that same year. Arzens was behind the designs of the BB and CC locomotives and their numerous derivatives which would together dominate the French railway network during the 1950s, 1960s and 1970s.

One of his earlier designs was for the smooth fronted CC7100 series. It was one of these, the CC7107, which broke the electric train speed record in 1955. The record would stand until broken by a TGV in 1981. Arzens was also behind the reverse sloping front window characteristic of the "Nez Cassé" series of locomotives, which he said had been inspired by the form of a "sprinter on the starting block".

Locomotives

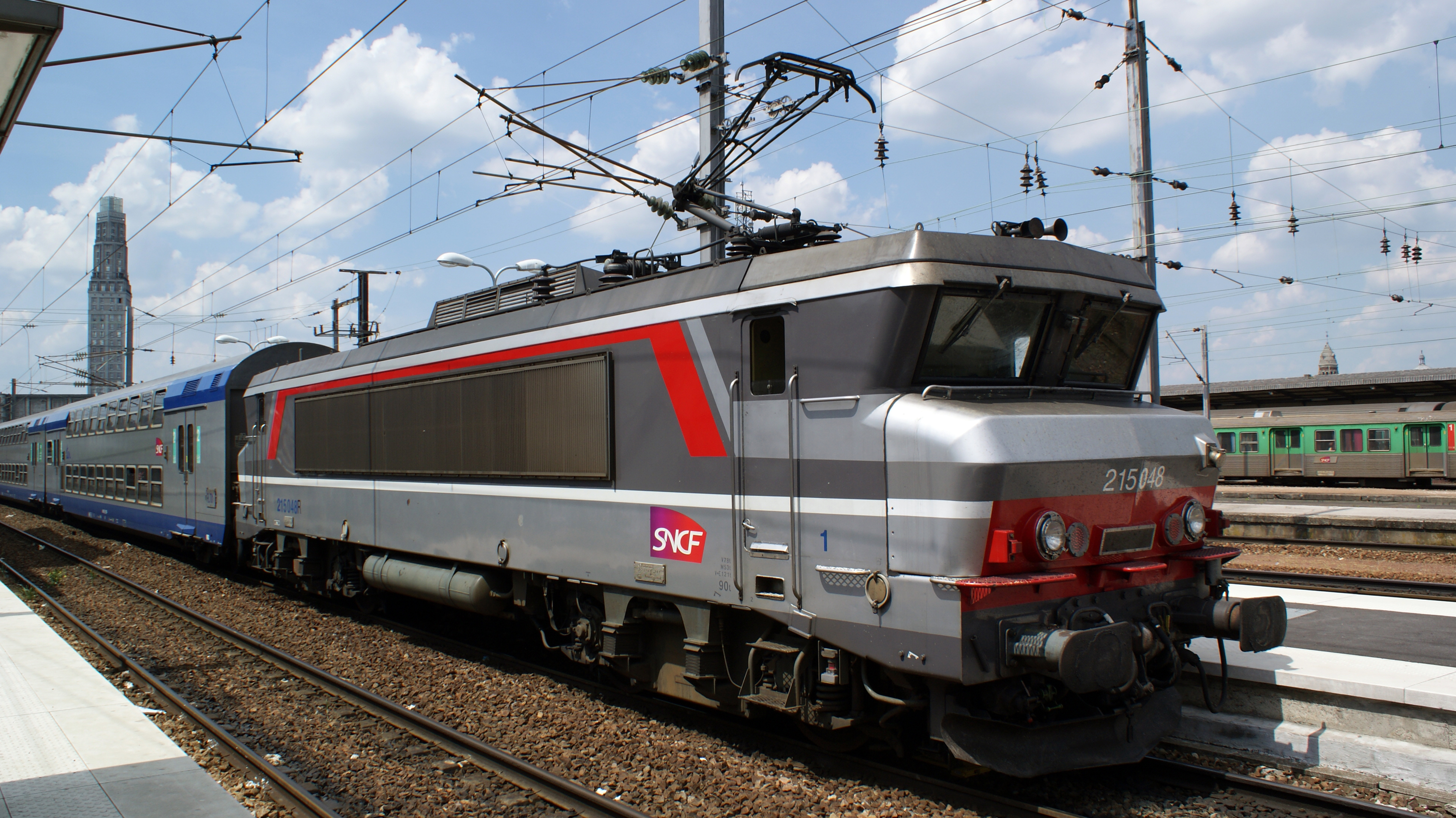
An Arzens-designed "broken nose" style of locomotive for the French Railways (SNCF), from a family of locomotives built from the late 1960s into the 1970s. Arzens was responsible for the design of French rail locomotives from the 1940s up to the 1970s.

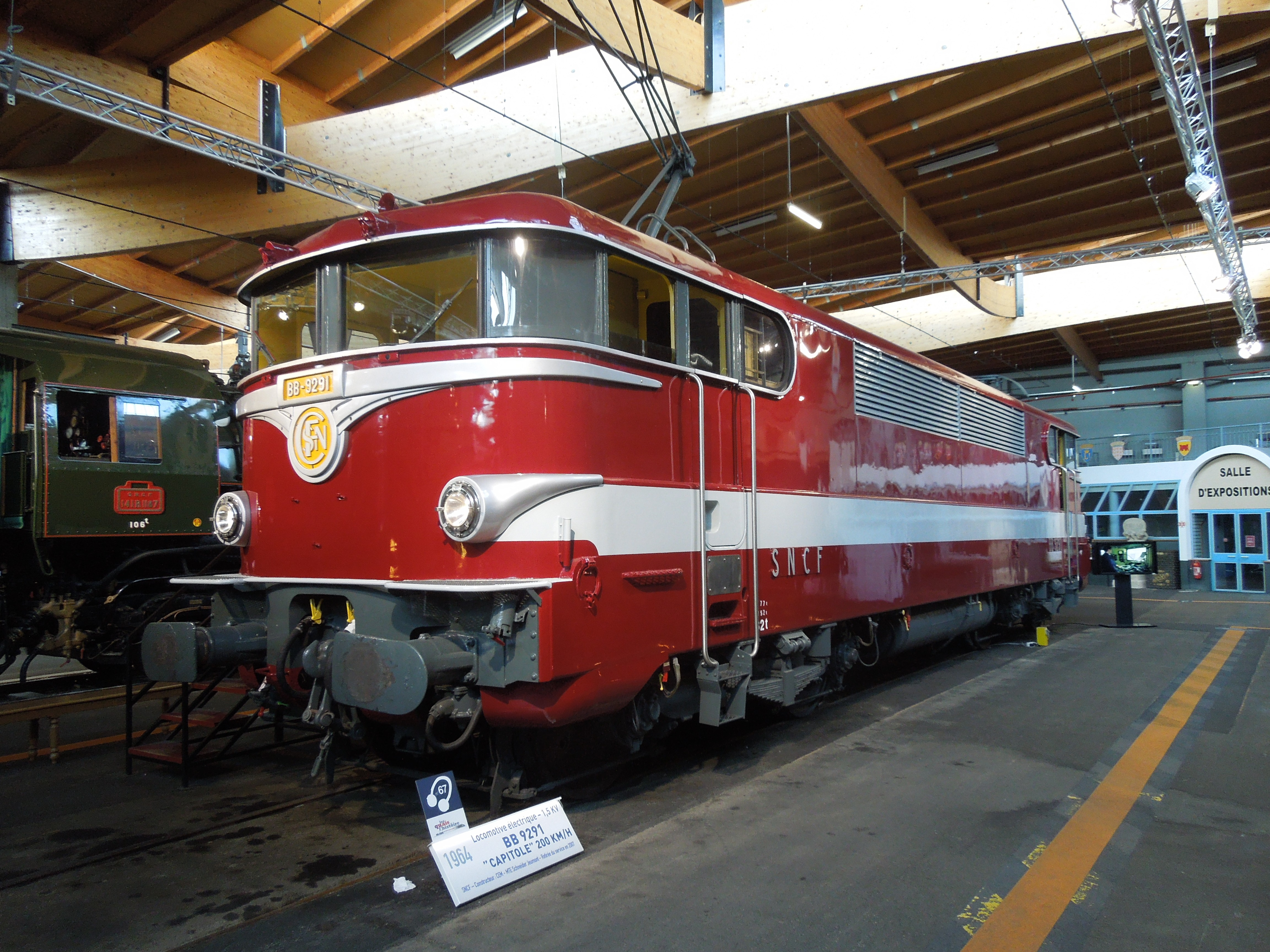
Locomotive BB 9200 in Capitole livree.

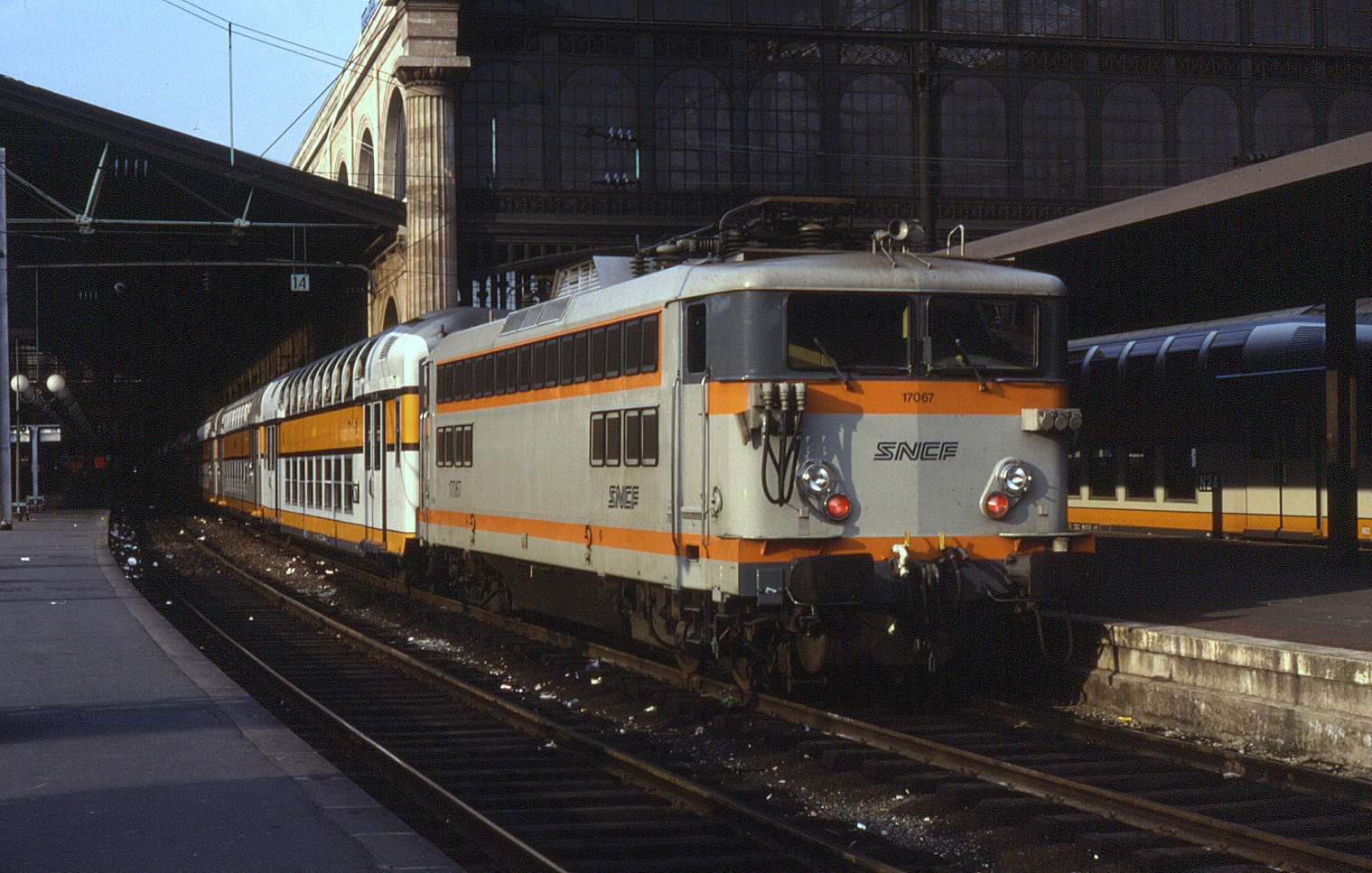
Locomotive BB 17067 béton

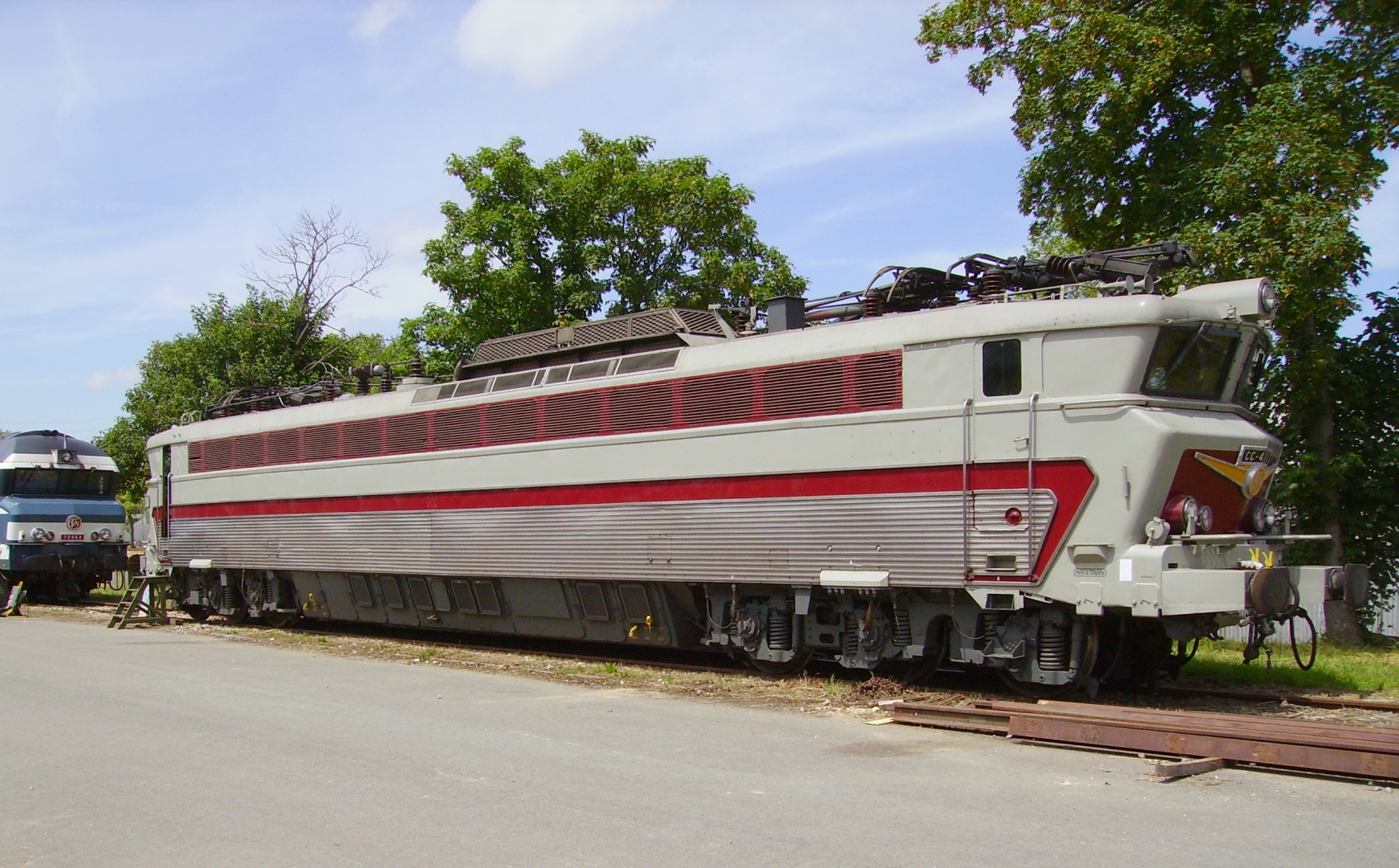
Locomotive CC 40110.

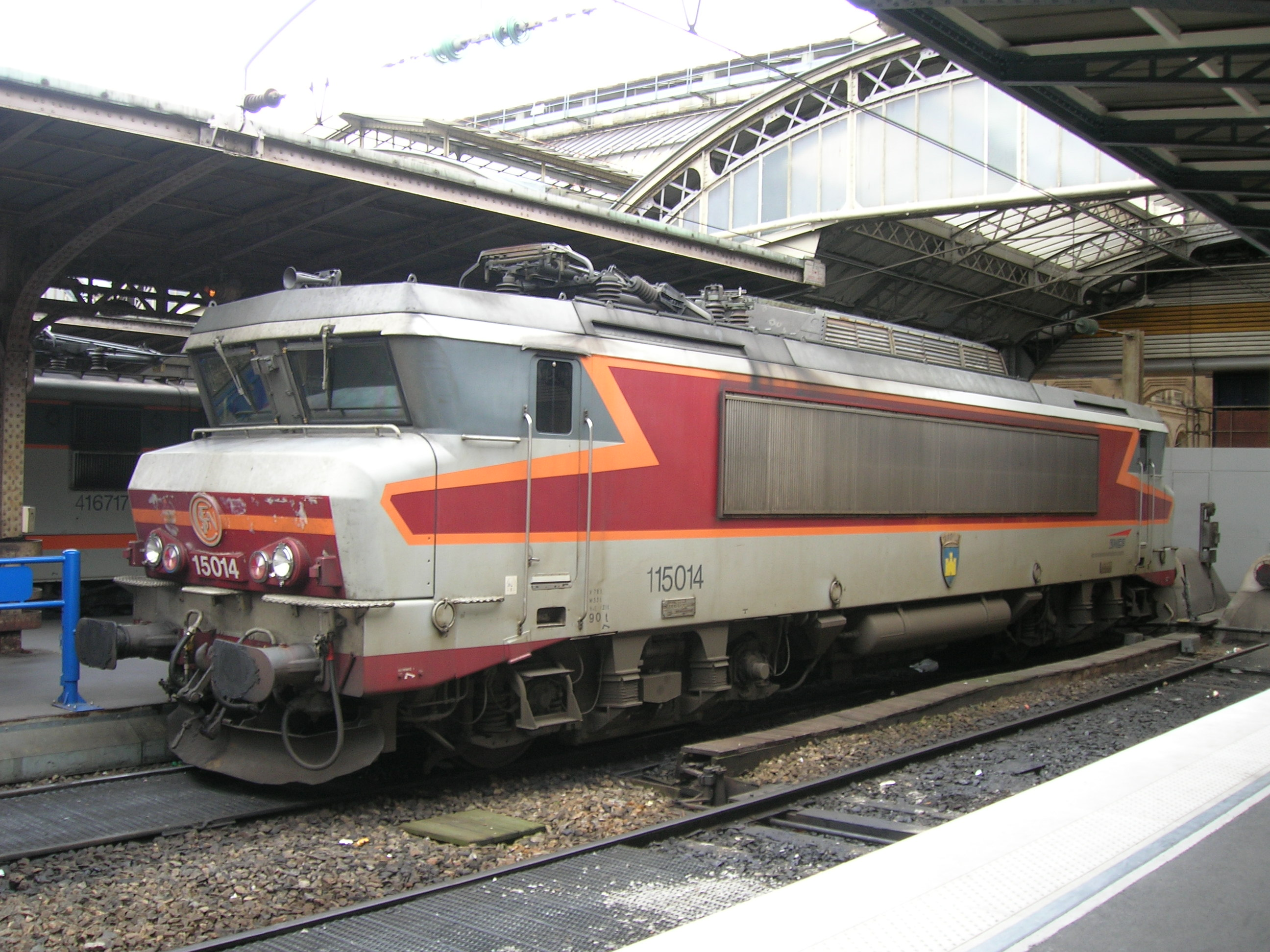
Locomotive BB 15000 in TEE Grand Confort livree

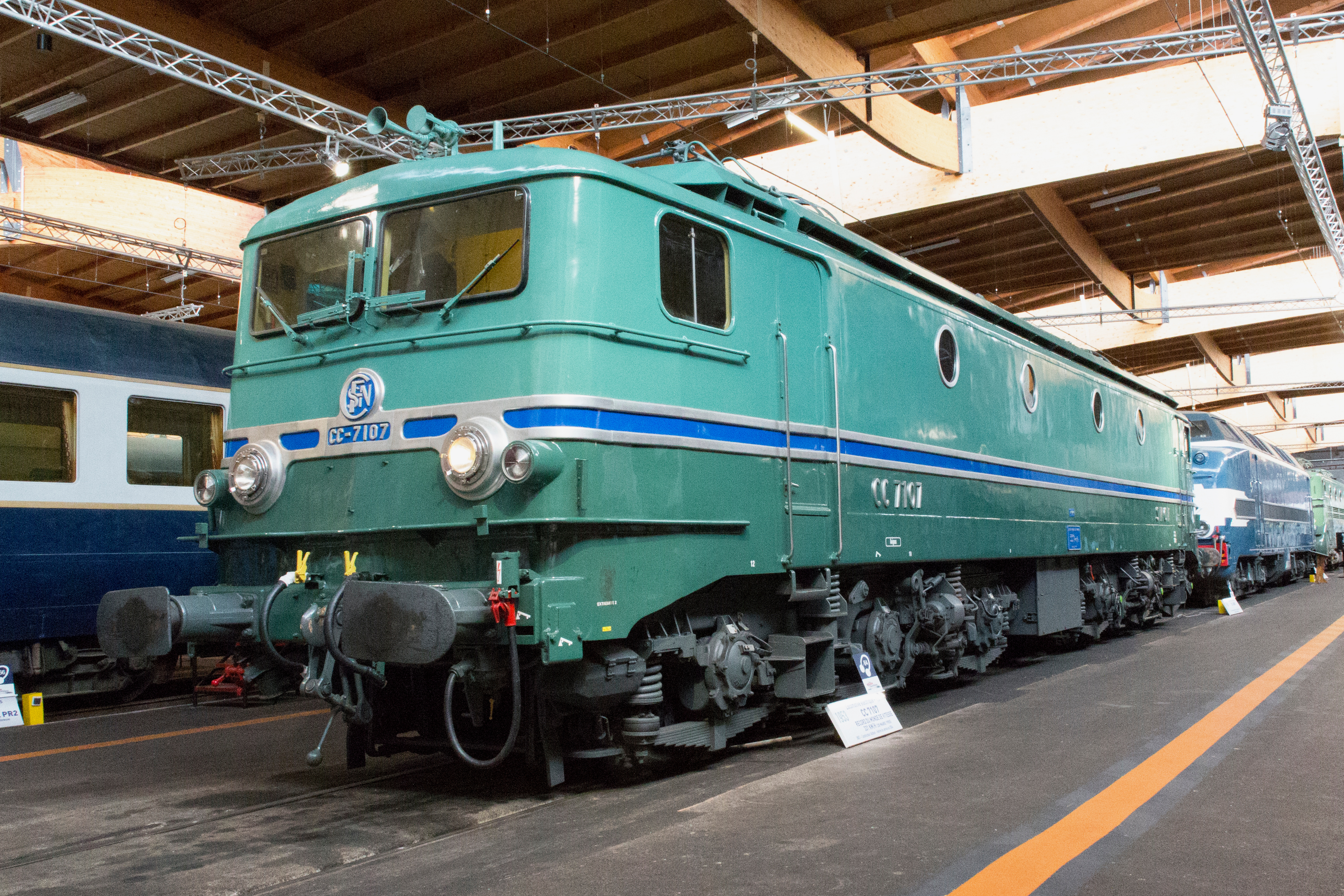
CC7100 series locomotive (CC 7107), with power delivered to all its wheels, achieved various speed records: its 1955 speed records for an electric locomotive stood unbroken for over 25 years.

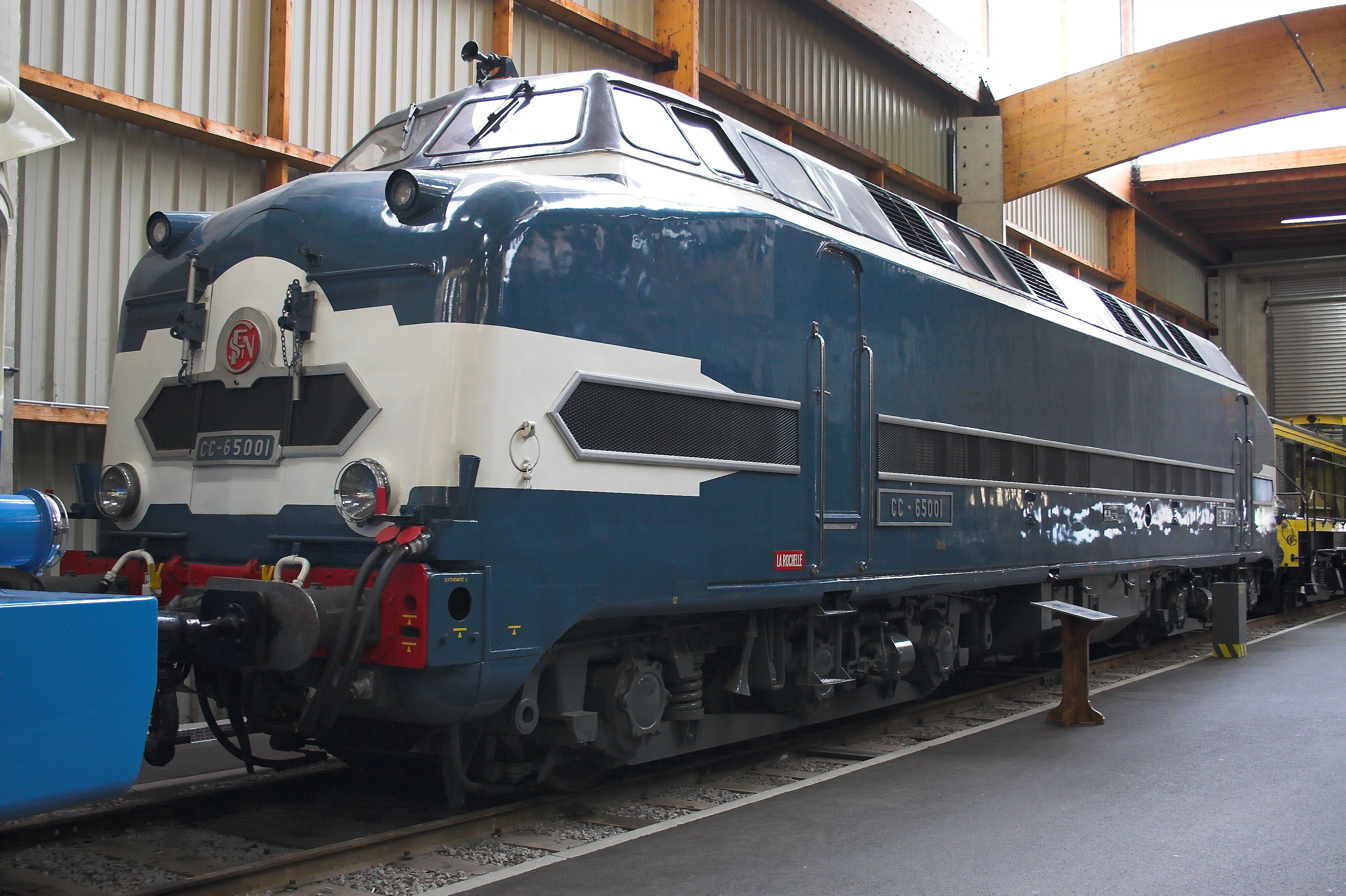
Diesel locomotive CC 65001

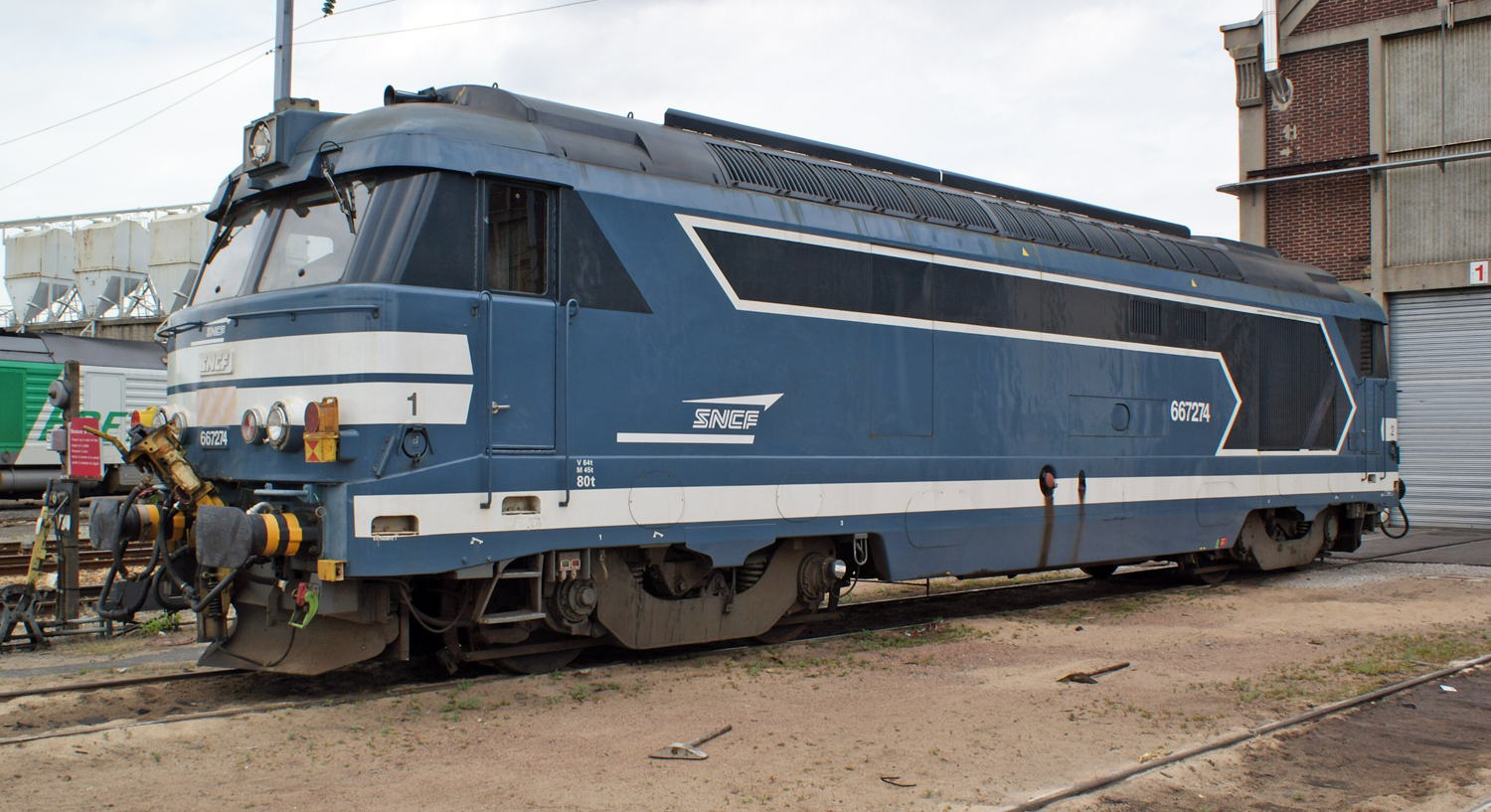
Diesel locomotive BB 67274.

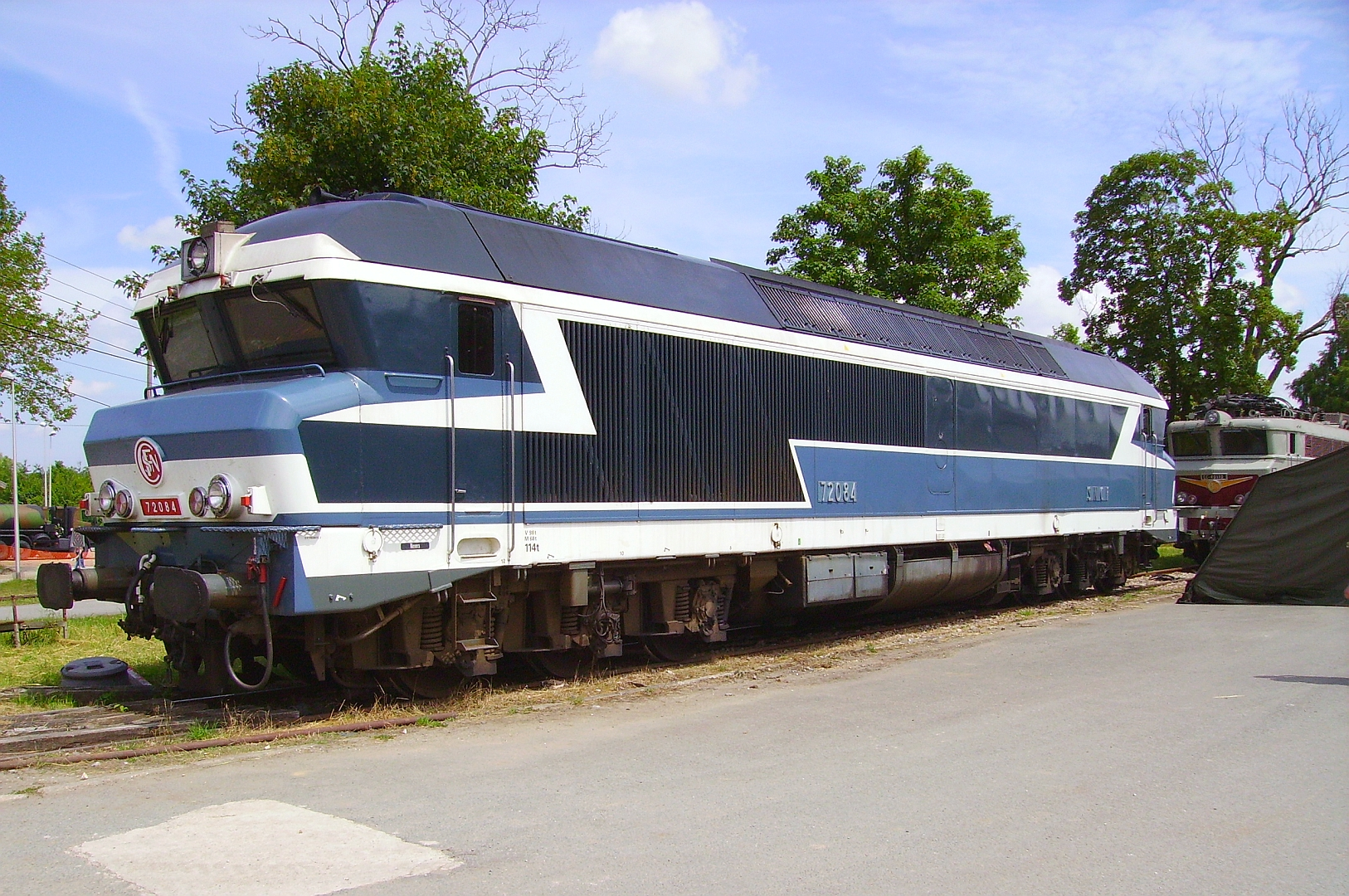
Diesel locomotive CC 72084
