= Molsheim Charterhouse =

Former Carthusian monastery in France

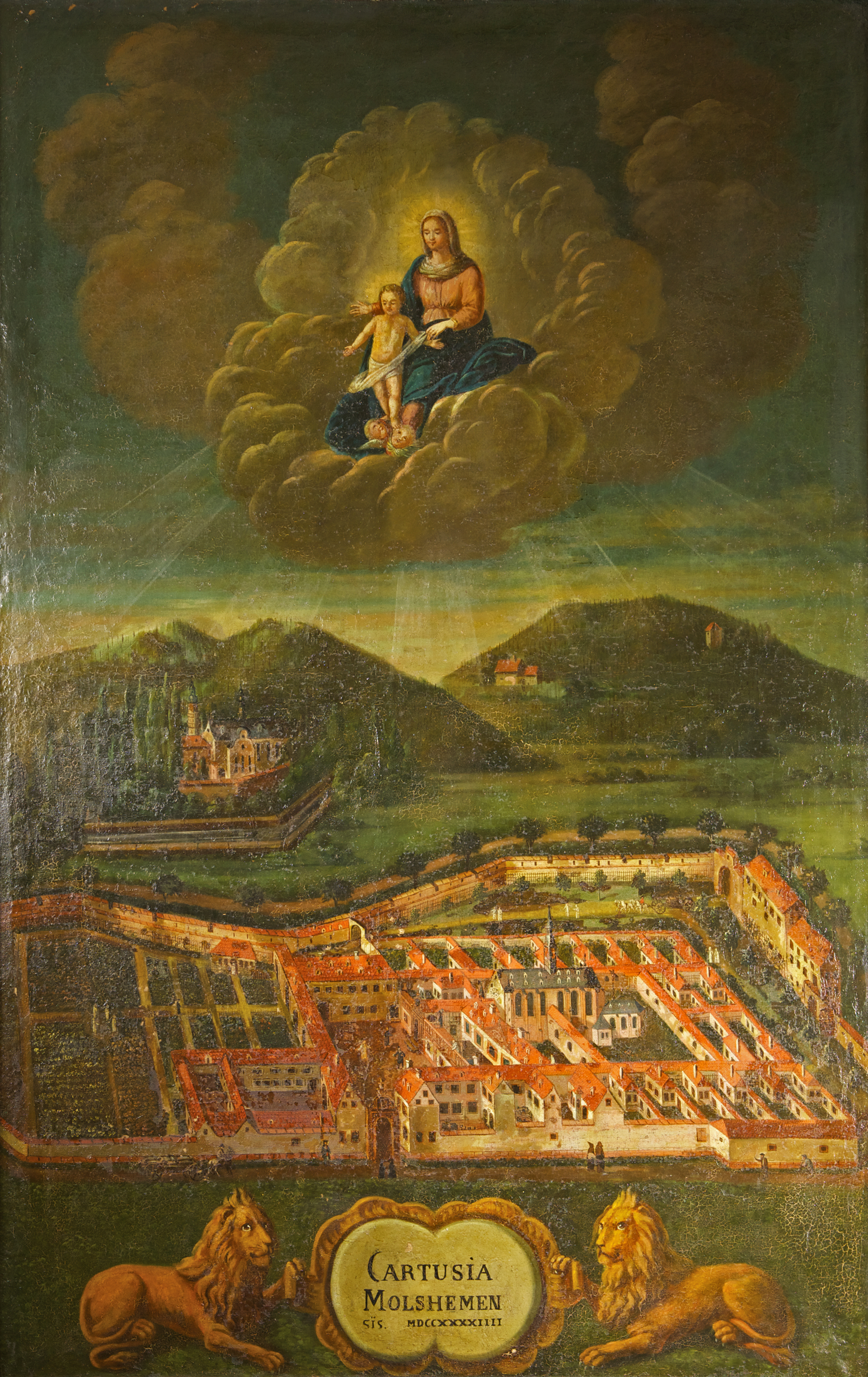
- Molsheim Charterhouse in 1744
- Interactive map of Molsheim Charterhouse

Monastery information
- Order: Carthusian Order
- Diocese: Archdiocese of Strasbourg

People
- Founder: Jean Schustein

Architecture
- Architect: Ulrich Tretsch (church) Giovan Betto (hotel)
- Style: Baroque architecture

Site
- Country: France
- Coordinates: 48.5429°N 7.4903°E
- Website: http://chartreuse-molsheim.info/

Molsheim Charterhouse (French: Chartreuse de Molsheim) is a former monastery of the Carthusian order, or charterhouse, located in the heart of the town of Molsheim, in the Lower Rhine region of Alsace (Grand Est region, France). It now houses the Musée de la Chartreuse.

After the Carthusian monastery of Koenigshoffen was destroyed in 1591, the Carthusian community took refuge with the Jesuits in Molsheim, the Alsatian capital of the Counter-Reformation, where the community decided to re-establish itself and to build a new monastery in 1626. This foundation is a rare, if not unique, case of a Carthusian monastery conceived as being integrated into the urban territory, which implies certain particular arrangements of the space.

This new charterhouse quickly became the city's main religious building in the 17th and 18th centuries. It is particularly renowned for the quality of the stained glass windows that decorated the large cloister of the fathers, as well as for its rich library and especially the famous codex Hortus deliciarum, which was kept there for several decades. The monks were also known for the medicinal "balls" that they made and sold.

The charterhouse was active until the French Revolution, during which time it was closed, sold as national property, divided into several lots, partially destroyed and provided with an urban roadway. For nearly two centuries, the remaining parts of the monastery, divided among several owners, were redeveloped or demolished as need arose. The furniture and stained glass windows were dispersed; some of them were destroyed later, either in 1870 during the siege of Strasbourg or during the Second World War. The local hospital acquired almost all the temporal buildings.

It was not until 1981 that an awareness of the heritage value of the remaining buildings emerged. From that date onwards, the municipality bought parts of the building and volunteers began restoring the buildings and the grounds. In 1985, the historical museum of the city of Molsheim, which had previously been located in the Metzig, moved into the former prior's house, as the Musée de la Chartreuse. In 1986, the Bugatti Foundation also set up an exhibition room in the former monastery kitchens.

The building has been classified as a historical monument since December 23, 1998.

== Location ==
The monastery is located in the north-western part of the historic city centre of Molsheim, between the Rue des Étudiants to the south, the Rue de la Chartreuse to the north, the Place du Marché to the east and the local hospital to the west. The town of Molsheim is itself located in Alsace, on the foothills of the Vosges, at the end of the Bruche Valley and on the left bank of the latter.

== Background ==
=== Establishment ===
==== Koenigshoffen Charterhouse ====
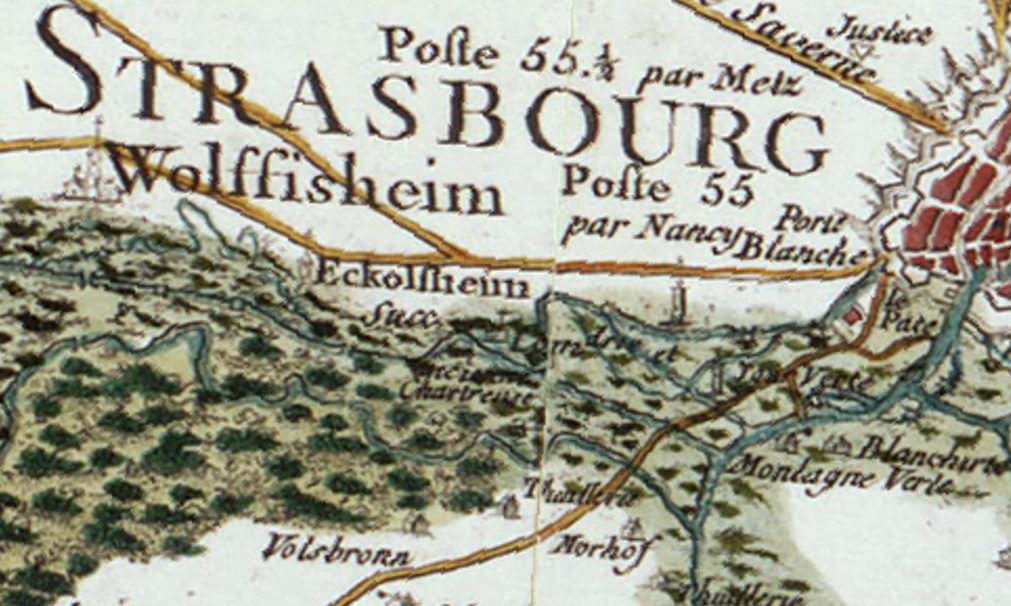
Extract from the Cassini map, on which the "old chartreuse" of Koenigshoffen is visible in the centre of the map, between the Bruche and the Bruche canal.

The Carthusian monastery located in Koenigshoffen - today a suburb of Strasbourg - and known as "Mont-Sainte-Marie" ("Marienbühl") was founded in 1335 on the banks of the Bruche by three monks, on land donated by Berthold II of Bucheck, bishop of Strasbourg. The monastery was spiritually fruitful and had 18 cells, and sent monks to support the charterhouses in Hildesheim and Basel. In 1418, the monastery had 16 fathers and 12 brothers; a century later, in 1521, there were still 15 fathers, nine lay people and four brothers. However, the introduction of the Reformation in Strasbourg three years later led to the departure of half of the 28 members of the community.

When the Peasants' War broke out in 1525, the charterhouse thought it could avoid being pillaged by placing itself under the protection of the town, which had then turned to Protestantism. In return, the Council of the XV first demanded that the Carthusian patrimony be managed by laymen, then forbade the holding of liturgical services, and finally the entry of novices, which condemned the community in the medium term. The head office of the Grande Chartreuse therefore envisaged the transfer of the community, but nothing was done at first.

In the early 1590s, Henry IV, who had borrowed 42,000 florins from the city of Strasbourg, decided to repay the city by offering it the charterhouse in lieu. On August 8, 1591, when only the prior Jean Schustein, three fathers and a donated brother remained in the premises, the Strasbourg Senate sent 300 masons and carpenters to dismantle the entire monastery, In 1592, it was destroyed "to the acclamation and joy" of the population, who salvaged all the materials to the point that nothing remained of it at the end of August. The library and liturgical ornaments were distributed among other religious houses in Strasbourg, and the monks were forcibly detained until May 1592 in their house known as the "Kartäuserhof" (Carthusian courtyard) located near Saint-Thomas, with the exception of the prior, who was authorised to take refuge in Mainz Charterhouse.

==== Transfer to Molsheim ====
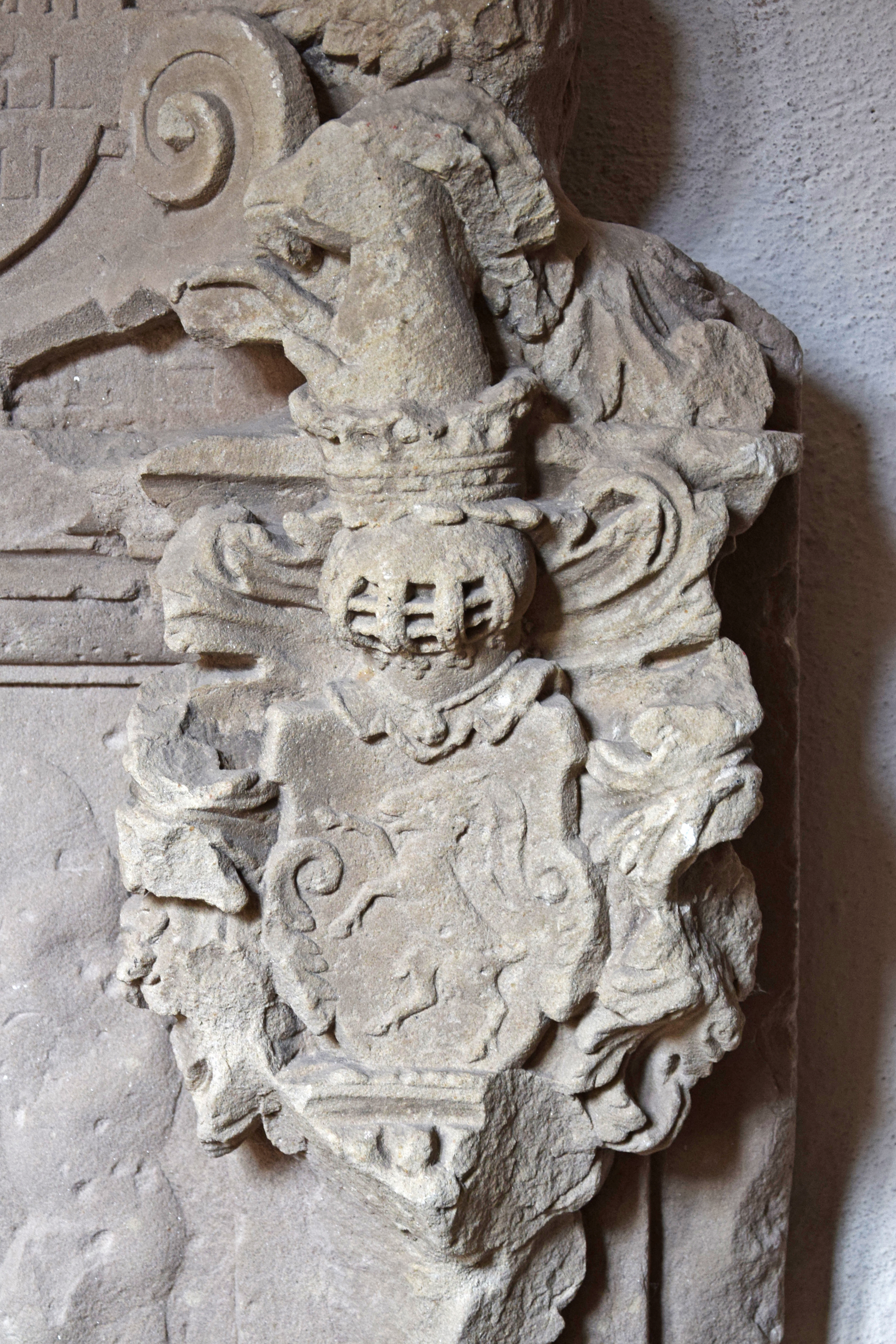
Arms of the Böcklin von Böcklinsau family, owners of the house sold to the Carthusian monks for the establishment of the charterhouse in Molsheim

From this last refuge, the former prior, assisted by his provincial superior, tried in vain to rejoin his community. He appealed to the bishops of Cologne, Mainz and Trier (Ernest of Bavaria, Wolfgang of Dalberg and John of Schönenberg respectively), who submitted a petition to Rudolf II. The latter promulgated the edict of March 5, 1594, enjoining the people of Strasbourg to re-establish the monastery and return their property to the monks. While waiting for this return, Jean Schustein was lodged in Molsheim, with the Jesuits, from October 1594. In 1597, he was joined by three Carthusian fathers and two brothers. In 1598, the provincial superior accepted the foundation of a new charterhouse in Molsheim, while the emperor reiterated his injunction to return it to the people of Strasbourg.

The community bought the house known as "Böcklerhof" from Barbe de Schauenbourg, widow of a Böcklin von Böcklinsau, for 5,000 florins; at the same time, on August 21, 1598, a treaty was signed between Henri IV and the Carthusian monks, the latter obtaining compensation of 7,500 livres tournois per annum for their losses in Strasbourg. At the same time, the city of Strasbourg finally agreed to make compensation; the prior and the magistrate of Molsheim were welcomed to Strasbourg by the Magistrate, who proposed an exchange to the monks: the land and property confiscated by the Protestant municipality were to be kept by the latter, but title deeds in 47 Catholic localities were to be granted in exchange. In addition, the keys to the room where the books and liturgical ornaments seized in Koenigshoffen were kept were to be given to them.

==== Foundation of the new charterhouse ====
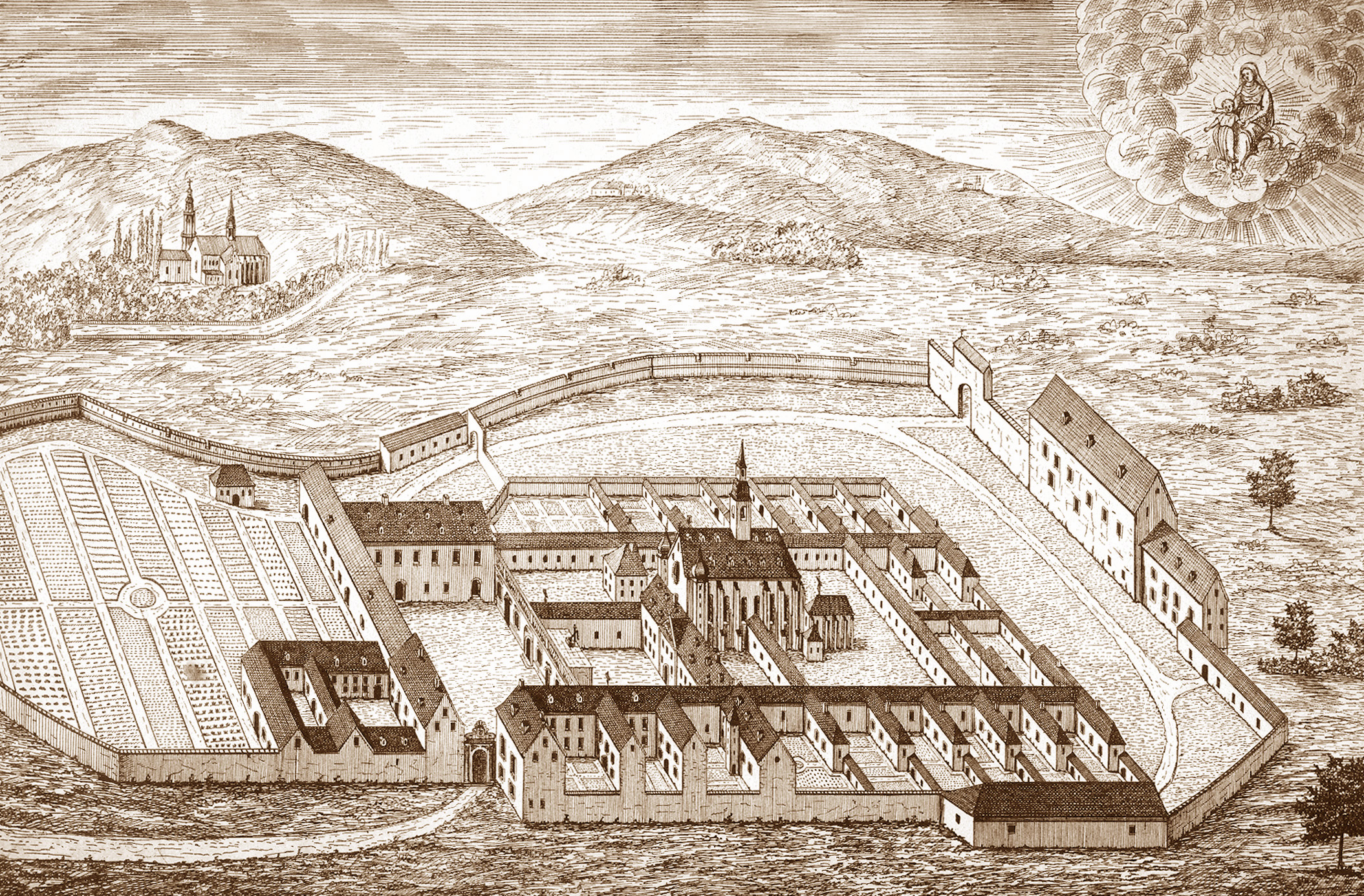
Engraving showing the charterhouse in the 18th century

The Carthusian community in Molsheim was increased by monks from Koblenz, Cologne, Mainz and Rettel near Thionville. The monks, who numbered six in 1600, received their first professed member the following year, Georges Schoen, from Sélestat. In 1602, Charles of Lorraine, Archbishop of Strasbourg, officially granted the Carthusian monks permission to re-found a monastery. Work therefore began on the Böcklerhof, with the installation of cells and a first oratory, consecrated on 16 April 1606, dedicated to the Trinity, Saint Sebastian, Saint Henry the Confessor and Saint Catherine.

Henri Topffer, prior from 1602 to 1612, celebrated the first mass in the conventual church on March 25, 1610; however, the building was not officially dedicated until August 3, 1614, with a dedication to the Trinity, Mary, John the Baptist and all the saints.

Numerous donations enabled the monastery to grow rapidly. The construction of the cloister was started in 1614. In 1619, three more monks arrived from the Carthusian monasteries in Mainz and Trier. In 1620, the first monk of Molsheim made his vows. In the same year, Prior Jean Leuken from Trier was murdered in front of his cell on February 14, 1619, and found by the monks with his skull split by an axe. The murderer then fled the town by climbing the ramparts, but lost some objects. Six days later, the soldiers sent to look for him found a certain Thomas Roettel, a "close relative" (probably a nephew) of the deceased, in Harthouse, near Haguenau. The latter had come two years earlier to study at the Jesuit college, and regularly attended the charterhouse under the pretext of visiting his uncle, but in reality to steal from the community's funds. He had been caught by the prior during his last theft and had hit him before fleeing. The trial was conducted by the municipality, more precisely by the court of mischief "Malefizgericht", which condemned Thomas to death with many tortures beforehand.

The Carthusian monastery was canonically recognised in statu perfecto in 1662.

=== Life of the Carthusian monastery ===
==== Community growth ====
Between 1623 and 1626, several additional monks joined the community, which also grew by five novices, including the first inhabitant of Molsheim, Jean-Jacques Fourmann. The Thirty Years' War showed the relevance of the establishment in a Catholic town. The Carthusian monks were not worried by the devastation caused by the fighting and looting. As a security measure, the archives and various precious goods were nevertheless sheltered in Benfeld and then in the Vosges until 1641.

Number of monks in the charterhouse
Date	Number
1617	17 fathers
1633	14 fathers
1666	17 fathers and 6 given
1721	Total of 20, including 14 French
1792	17 fathers and 6 brothers

On May 9, 1623, the cornerstone of the chapter house was laid by master masons Lucas Vieph and Christophe Wambser; two years later, on October 26, 1625, the building was completed and consecrated.

Louis Pergener was prior from 1651 to 1660 and greatly expanded the monastery, acquiring the "Berggasse" and several adjoining plots of land to integrate them into the premises. His successor, Martin Malburg, led the monastery until 1665; he was the first prior to be elected canonically by the monks and not appointed by the province. The charterhouse of Molsheim remained a relatively small community, which was dictated by the small size of the monastery, squeezed into a constrained urban space. The number of 25 monks seems to never have been exceeded.

The recruitment of monks shows the very broad influence of the monastery. Only 31 of the 152 fathers who lived there during its two centuries of existence were Alsatians; the vast majority of the other monks came from the Rhine valley. As for the brothers, who were less numerous, they were slightly more from the region, with 13 Alsatians, mainly from Molsheim itself and the surrounding area, out of 47 brothers. The cells were generally allocated to the Carthusian fathers for life, and this custom was in any case viewed favourably by the community. However, for reasons of health or various grievances, it is possible that cell transfers took place. In Molsheim, Father Nicolas Scheckler moved several times before dying in cell L in 1695. Conversely, Nicolas Baustert did not leave cell H, which he entered in 1661, until he was very ill, shortly before his death in 1692.

In the spring of 1683, the town of Molsheim, including the Charterhouse, was visited by Louis XIV and his wife Maria Theresa. Accompanied by a few princesses from her retinue, she received exceptional permission to enter the church, the cloister and even some of the monastic cells. Since Carthusian customs forbid women from entering a male monastery, these privileged few remained unique in the history of the Molsheim community.

==== Priors of the Charterhouse ====
List of priors of the charterhouse
Dates	Name	Death	Other details
1594-1602	Johannes Schutein	October 5, 1603	Buried in the Jesuit church
1602-1612	Henricus Topffer	May 6, 1612	Buried in the Carthusian church
1613-1619	Joannes Leucken	February 14, 1619	Murdered in his cell
1619-1622	Joannes Udalricus Repff	August 3, 1645	Died at Gdańsk Charterhouse
1622-1636	Michael Arnoldi	August 25, 1659	Died at Trier Charterhouse
1637-1651	Wilhelmus Hackstein	August 3, 1653	Died at Cologne Charterhouse
1651-1660	Franciscus Ludovicus Pergener	June 25, 1660	Buried in the Carthusian graveyard
1660-1665	Martinus Malburg	December 1st, 1665	Buried in the Carthusian graveyard
1666-1672	Vincentius Gretzinger	March 9, 1672	Buried in the Carthusian graveyard
1672-1679	Petrus Gubel	April 29, 1679	Buried in the Carthusian graveyard
1689-1684	Gerardus Poeyn	February 2nd, 1684	Buried in the Carthusian graveyard
1684-1692	Conrad Odendal	July 8, 1692	Died from a fall in the church
1692-1715	Philippus Zell	1716	
1715-1716	Petrus Horst	February 4, 1716	Author of the Annales cartusiæ molshemensis
1716-1727	Raphaël Schaub	1727	
1727-1766	Bruno Fortin	1766	Born in Molsheim
1766-1771	Gabriel Landonnet	1771	
1771-1782	Lucas Ryss	1782	Born in Sélestat
1782-1792	Jean-Baptiste Beck	June 3, 1794	Born in Ribeauvillé, where he was buried.

During the priorate of Conrad Odendal, the prior's house was built, which was later mistakenly called "Carthusian Priory". On 7 November 1684, the altar in the chapel of this building was consecrated in honour of the Trinity and the Holy Family. Shortly afterwards, in 1698, the original "Böcklerhof" building was demolished to create a large courtyard in front of the new house, known as the "Carthusian Courtyard" or "Cour d'Honneur", surrounded to the west by the temporal buildings and to the east by the church and the prior's house.

==== Legacy of the monastery ====
The first estates of the charterhouse consisted of properties given to it in compensation by the city of Strasbourg in 47 Catholic towns and villages: these properties were spread out from Sélestat to Wissembourg, i.e. over the area of the present-day Lower Rhine. In addition to these initial properties, there were numerous donations from nobles, burghers and clergymen. This property was in constant evolution due to exchanges and rearrangements. Although the state of the properties was never fixed, an estimate in the middle of the 18th century shows that Molsheim Charterhouse owned land in nearly 100 places: in the vineyards of the Vosges foothills (from Dambach-la-Ville to Marlenheim), in the wet lowlands of the Ried, between Benfeld and Erstein, in the cereal-growing lands of the Kochersberg, mainly north of Truchtersheim, around the Haguenau forest, mainly in Soufflenheim, Bischwiller and Betschdorf, and finally in Outre-Forêt, near Niederbronn. A few rare possessions were located in distant Rhine regions, in Trier, Mainz, Baden and Durlach.

These possessions were mainly located (42% at the time) in lands under the sovereignty of the archbishop of Strasbourg, mainly those around Dachstein, Benfeld, Schirmeck and in the Kochersberg. 11% were located in lands under the seigniory of Choiseul-Stainville, mainly near Haguenau; another 11% were attached to the County of Hanau-Lichtenberg, which was then under the control of the Landgraviate of Hesse-Darmstadt; another 11% belonged to various nobles of Lower Alsace. The remaining quarter was under the authority of the free imperial city of Strasbourg, or the cities of the Décapole, or abbeys or chapters in the region. Approximately three quarters were located in Catholic localities, but almost a quarter in Protestant areas; this was obviously not the case at the time of the 1598 exchange. These properties in Protestant lands were mainly those located in the Outre-Forêt, in Barr, Berstett, Wasselonne and Oberbronn.

More precisely, in Molsheim, the monastery owned 250 Ackers (fifty to sixty hectares), which were divided into 63% of fields, 19% of vineyards and 18% of meadows. The latter were located on the least productive land, mainly in the main riverbed of the Bruche. The river diversions carried out by Vauban also meant that the community lost a significant part of the meadow land it had. The meadows, generally divided into long and narrow plots, were located in the plain, towards Dorlisheim in the south, Altrof in the south-east and Avolsheim in the north. The vineyards were divided into three groups of plots on the slopes of the Bruderthal.

The possessions of Molsheim Charterhouse

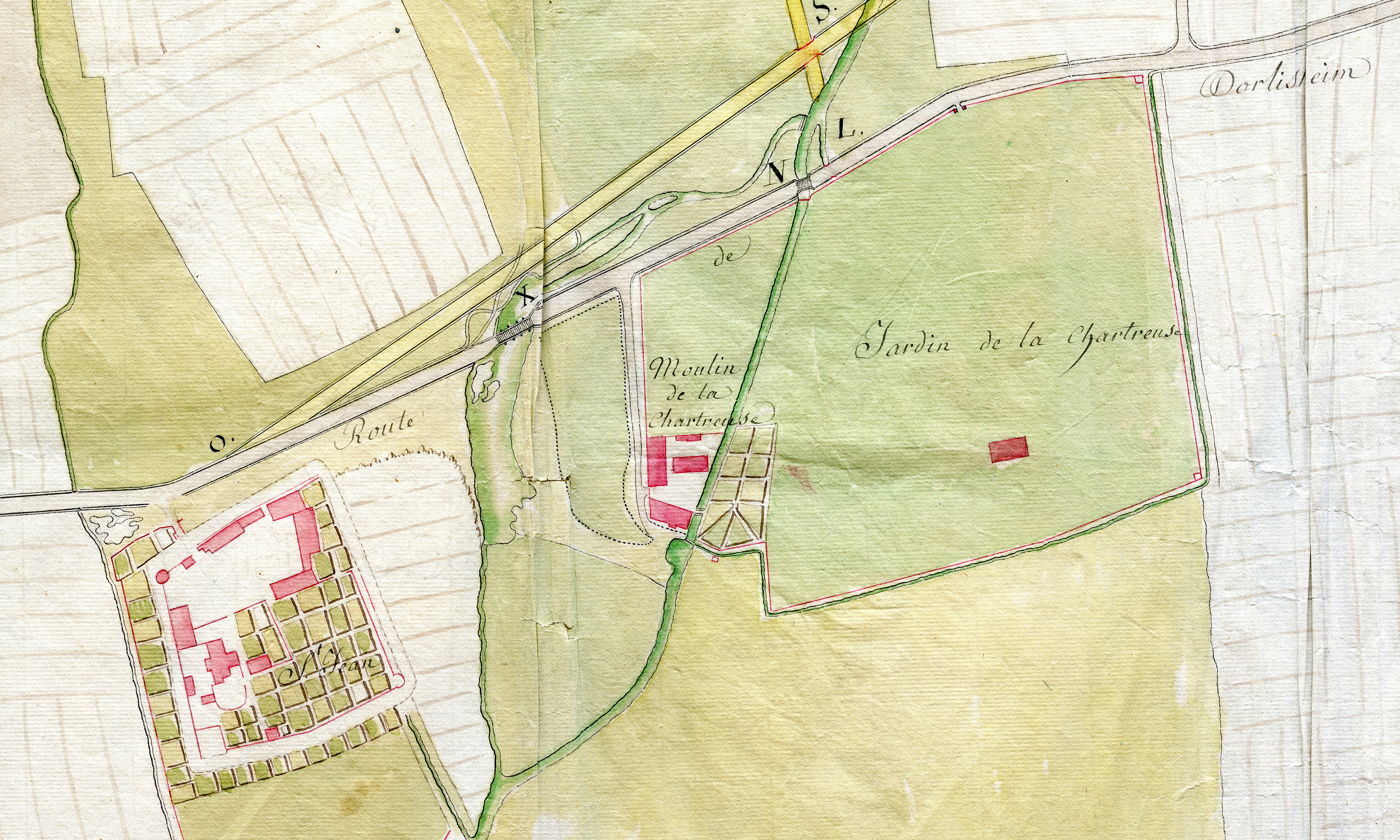
Map of the moulin des chartreux ("mill of the Carthusians") in Dorlisheim at the end of the 18th century, on the site of the future Bugatti factory. Map of the Chartreux mill in Dorlisheim at the end of the 18th century, on the site of the future Bugatti factory.

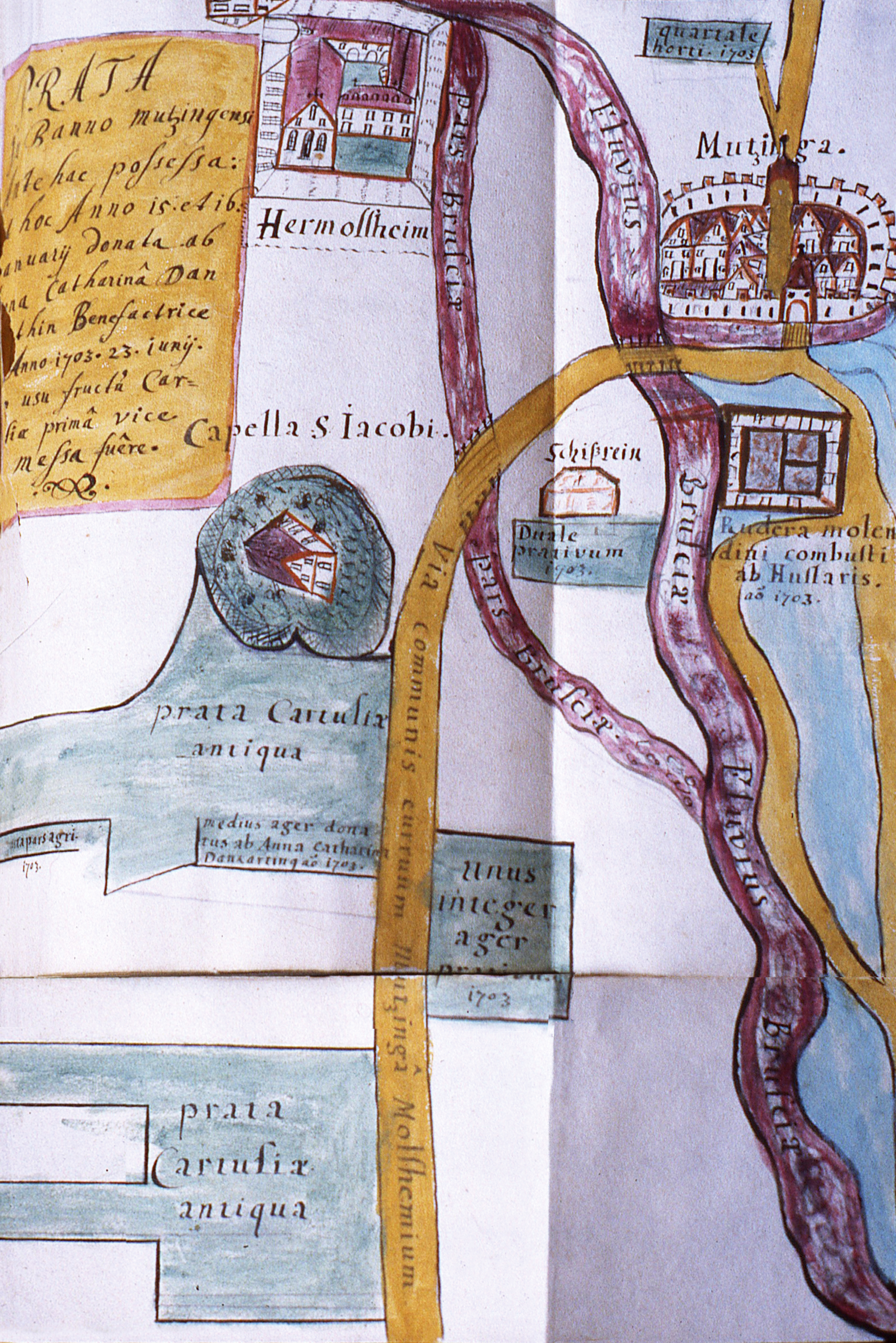
Possessions of Molsheim Charterhouse on the territory of Mutzig in 1702

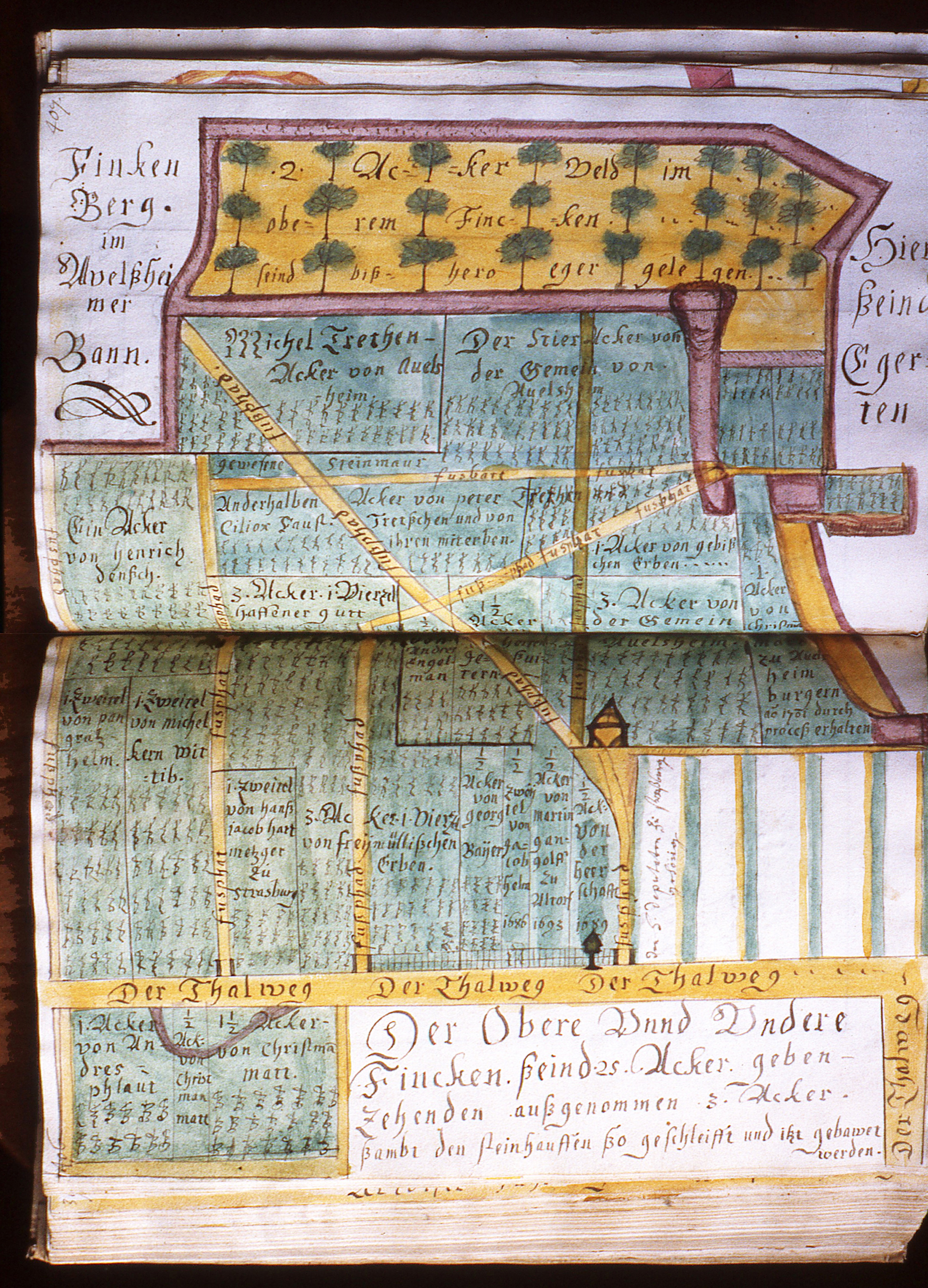
Map of the possessions of Molsheim Charterhouse in the Finkenberg (districts of Avolsheim and Molsheim) in 1702.

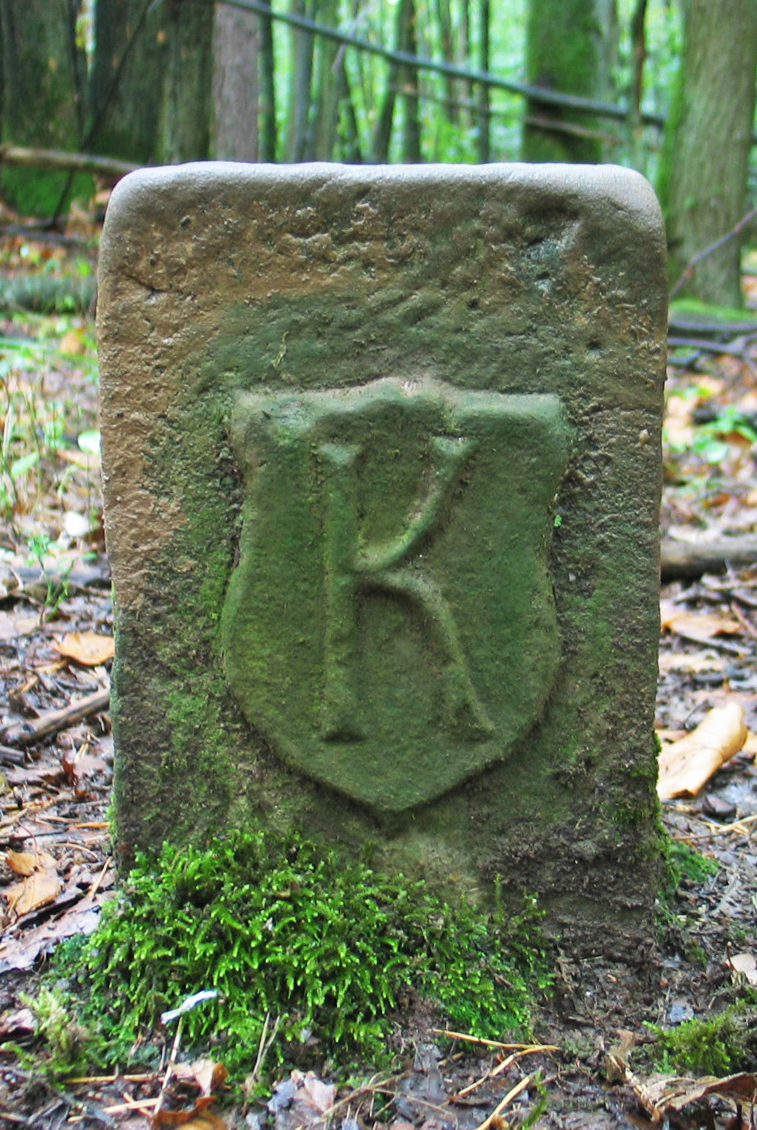
Boundary marker for the property of Molsheim Charterhouse ("Kartause" in German) in the Boersch forest, at a place called Gemsberg.

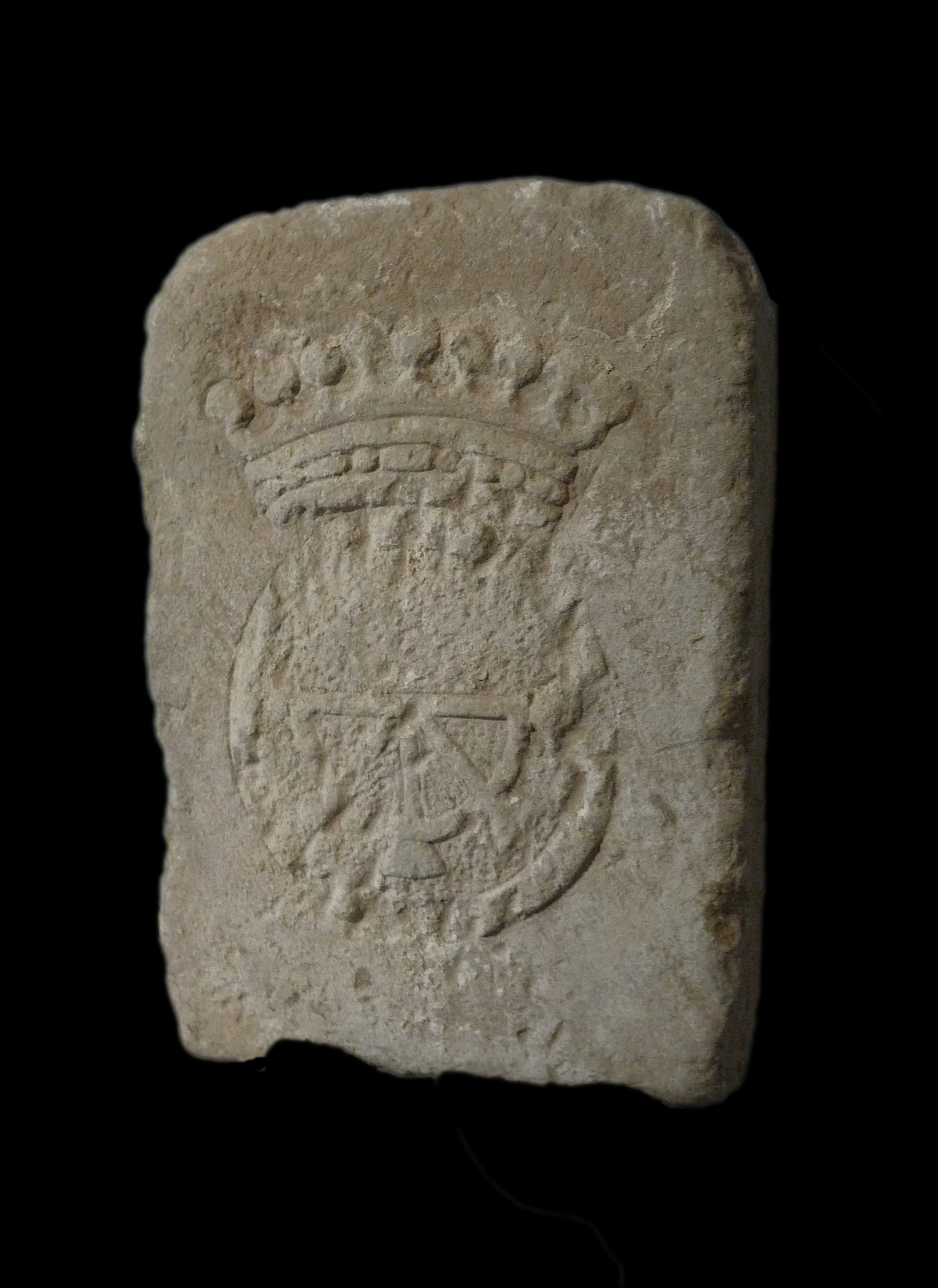
Boundary marker of the Avolsheim ban, where the Finkenhof farm and the Carthusian monks' vineyard were located.

==== Carthusian handicrafts ====
In the 18th century, the Carthusians of Molsheim were known in the region for the production of their medicinal "balls". The exact composition is now lost, but at least some elements are still known. The balls included at least potassium bitartrate, iron, frankincense, myrrh and resin mastic. These substances were crushed in a mortar and mixed to form a paste that had to be pressed into a mould. The resulting balls weighed from "one to one and a half ounces" (i.e. thirty to fifty grams). Finally, they were dried and brushed with a solution of gum and a few drops of walnut dye to make them black and shiny.

The balls were reputed to be effective against chlorosis (hypochromic anaemia), rickets, leucorrhoea (non-bloody vaginal discharge), and more generally against anaemia and asthenia. The medication was extremely simple to use: the ball was to be soaked in water until it became amber in colour, when the solution was to be drunk. After use, the ball was simply put to dry in the air or in the shade. The balls were also used as a compress to treat bruises, wounds and strains.

The medicinal balls of the Carthusian monks

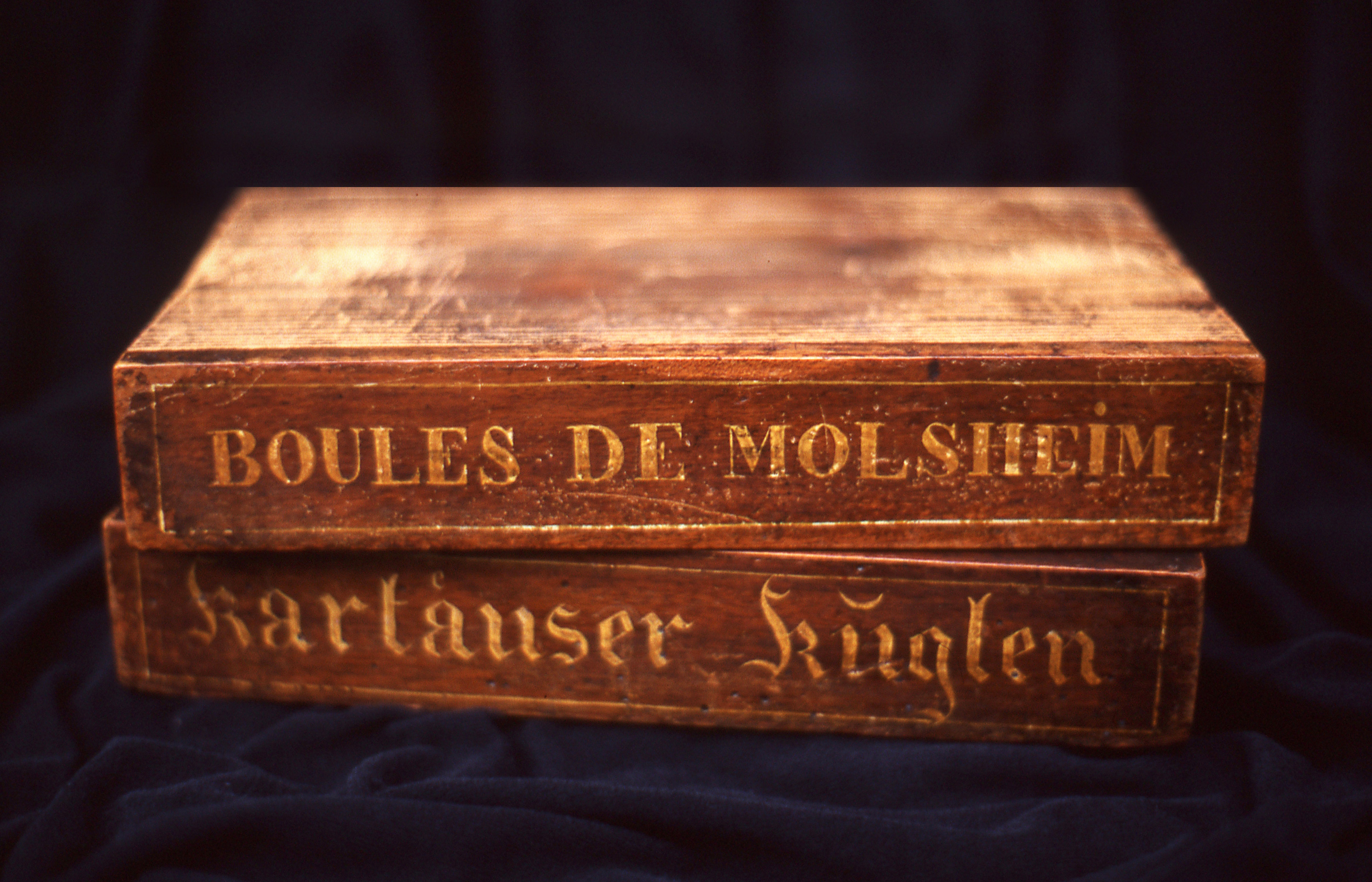
Displays of Molsheim balls.

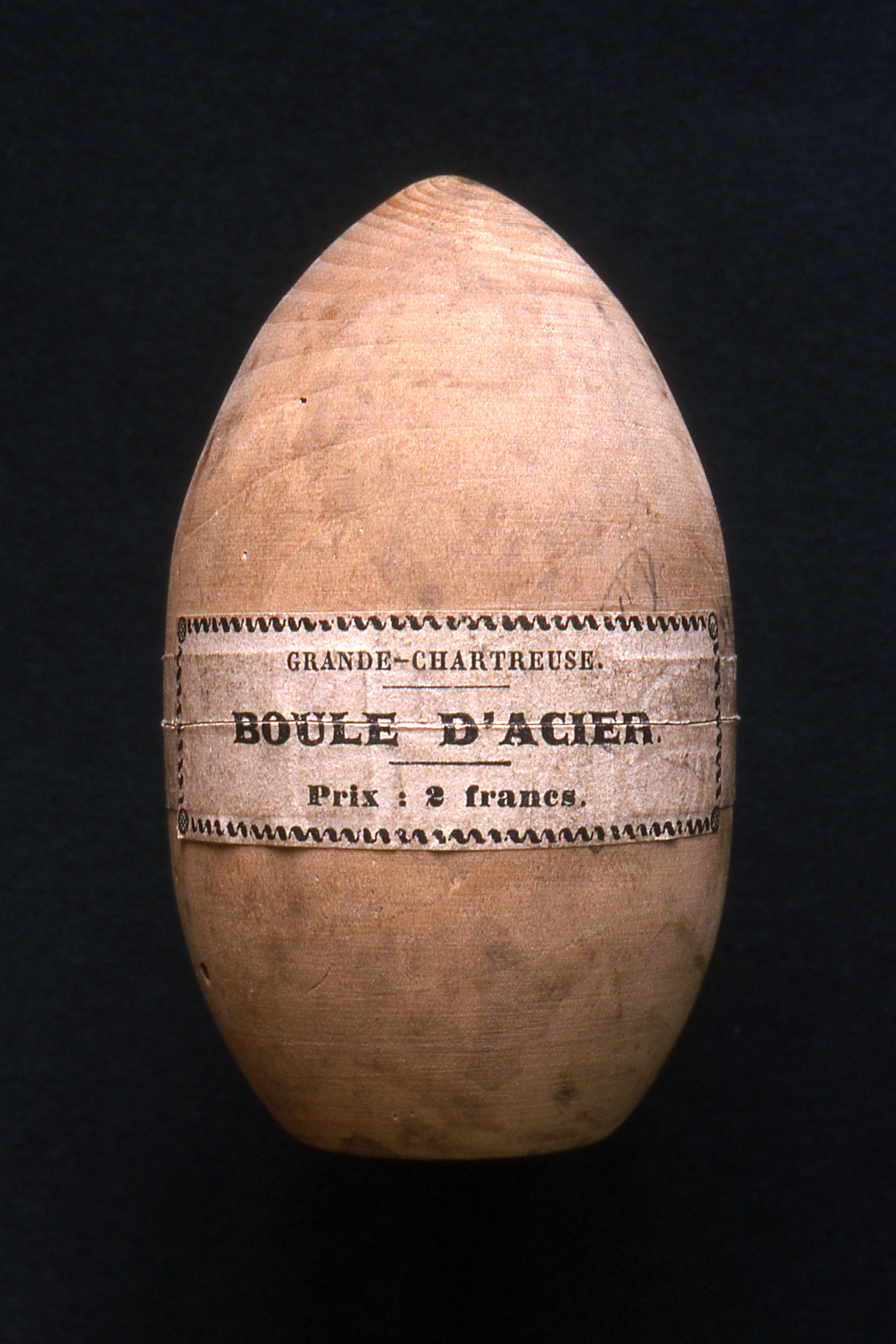
Wooden case of a ball made at the Grande Chartreuse according to the Molsheim model.

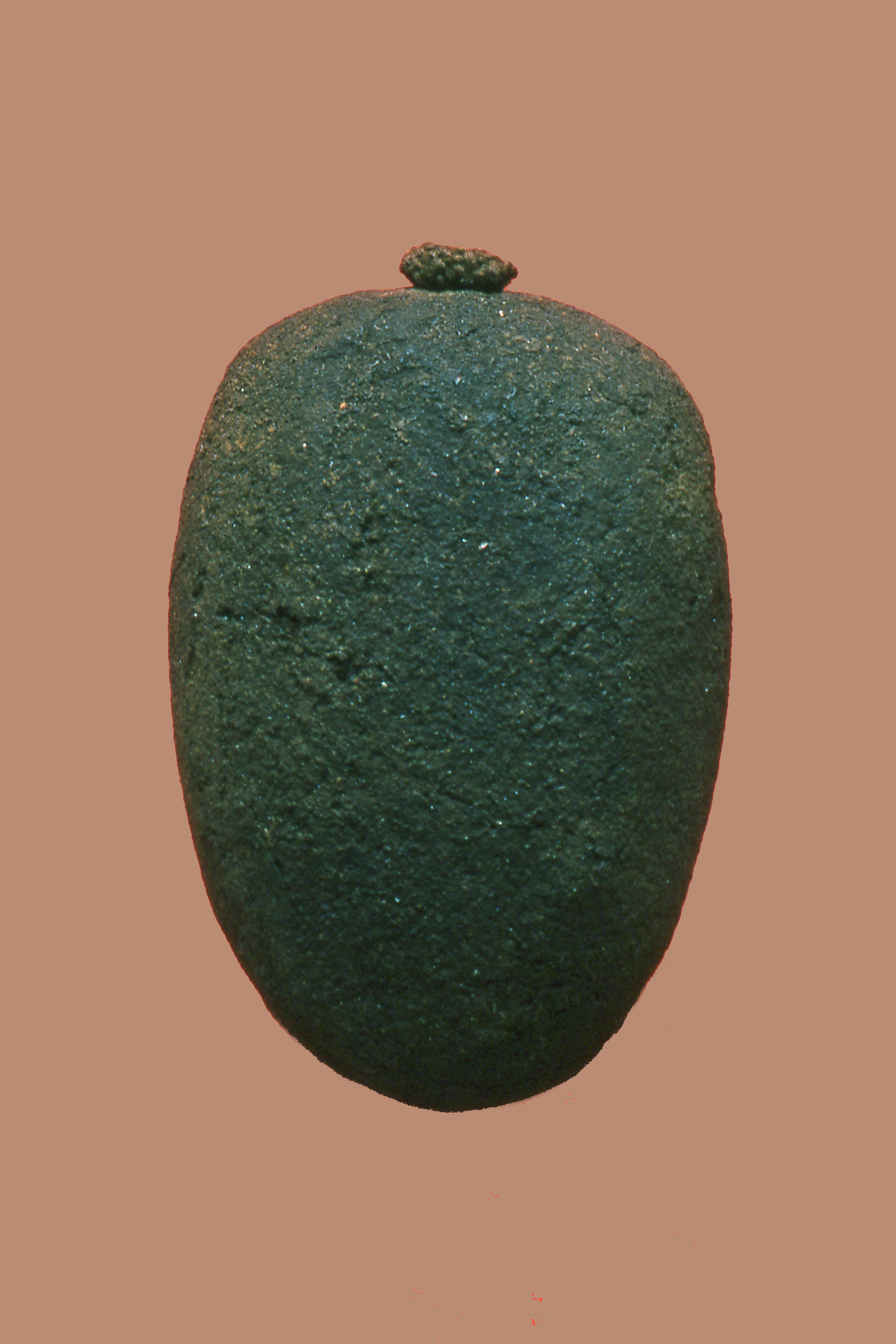
A "Nancy" ball made according to the Molsheim process at Bosserville Charterhouse.

In addition to the balls, the Carthusian fathers also made a "medicinal wine", the alleged effects of which were diuretic and stomachic. A number of substances, mainly of plant origin, but also potassium bitartrate in very small doses, were combined in a sachet which the monks left to infuse for 24 hours in warm white wine. This medicine was developed by one of the monks of Koenigshoffen, Otto Brunfels (1488-1534).

==== The library and the books of the Charterhouse ====
The library of the charterhouse at Koenigshoffen was particularly rich in manuscripts, which the city of Strasbourg acquired in 1591. Jean Pappus made an incomplete list of 265 volumes, 342 manuscripts and 83 printed documents. Of these books, the Carthusian monks tried to reclaim in 1596 the "choir books" (used for the liturgy) as well as copies of works from the library. In 1600, their request was partially granted and the 83 printed books were returned, forming the basis of the future Molsheim Charterhouse library. The library was initially located in the "Böcklerhof" in the main courtyard. As the latter building was demolished, the library was transferred at an unknown date, but after 1744, to the former T cell, which was raised by one floor to accommodate the entire collection. The top floor of this building was then connected to a "gallery", probably a mezzanine, which facilitated access to the works. As cell T was located on the right of the passage joining the church to the southern cloister, the library extended over the latter passage.

During the French Revolution, the inventory carried out on July 13, 1790, shows that the monastic library contained 4,133 works, 486 manuscripts and 184 sets of archives, the library having suffered neither from the Thirty Years' War nor from other depredations; the records of the monastery do not, however, allow for a detailed analysis of the acquisition policy. On the other hand, until 1688, the monastery had its books bound externally. From the latter date onwards, the monks themselves carried out the binding, which explains the purchase of hides and skins. The works in the library bear a mark of ownership: either a handwritten inscription on the title page or a marking on the binding, with a call number. The call number indicated a capital letter which specified the theme, then a column number and a row number.

The Hortus deliciarum ("garden of delights") is by far the most famous item in the library. It is a codex, created by Herrad of Landsberg for the religious instruction of her nuns at Mont Sainte-Odile Abbey, and dating from the 11th century; it was considered the most valuable manuscript preserved in Alsace. It consisted of 342 folios with 336 thumbnails of almost 7,000 persons, presenting a wide range of subjects, such as theology, philosophy, history, astronomy, physics, geography and mythology. The text, for its part, was a Christian anthology divided into four sections: Old and New Testaments, religious life and salvation.

Miraculously, it was spared from the fire that struck Mont Sainte-Odile in 1546; Erasmus of Strasbourg then had it transferred to Saverne in 1609. At an unknown date, it was transferred to the charterhouse in Molsheim, but the reasons, circumstances and conditions of this transfer are not known. The Carthusian monks made a copy of it between 1693 and 1695, but kept it secret from scholars, visiting monks and still more from visitors.

In 1790, it was the last prior who handed it over personally to the District Commissioner, Citizen Widenloecher. In 1792, all of the monastery's volumes were transported to Strasbourg and integrated into the municipal library, as were all of the books confiscated from the religious institutions of the Lower Rhine. This sealed the fate of most of these works, since the fire caused by the Prussian bombardment during the siege of Strasbourg in 1870 destroyed almost all the works stored in the building. The surviving works are those returned to the Church by the library in 1827 and entrusted to the Grand séminaire de Strasbourg, the latter building not being affected by the fire of 1870. There are 169 works preserved from the Carthusian library of Molsheim, consisting of two incunabula, 41 works from the 16th century, 123 from the 17th century and three from the 18th century. In addition to this collection, a few very rare works have been preserved elsewhere, at Mont-Sainte-Odile (seven works), at the Bischenberg convent (one work), in the present-day Musée de la Chartreuse in Molsheim (three works), at the Bibliothèque Nationale et Universitaire (one work) and at the convent of the Sisters of Divine Providence in Ribeauvillé (one work).

The library's works

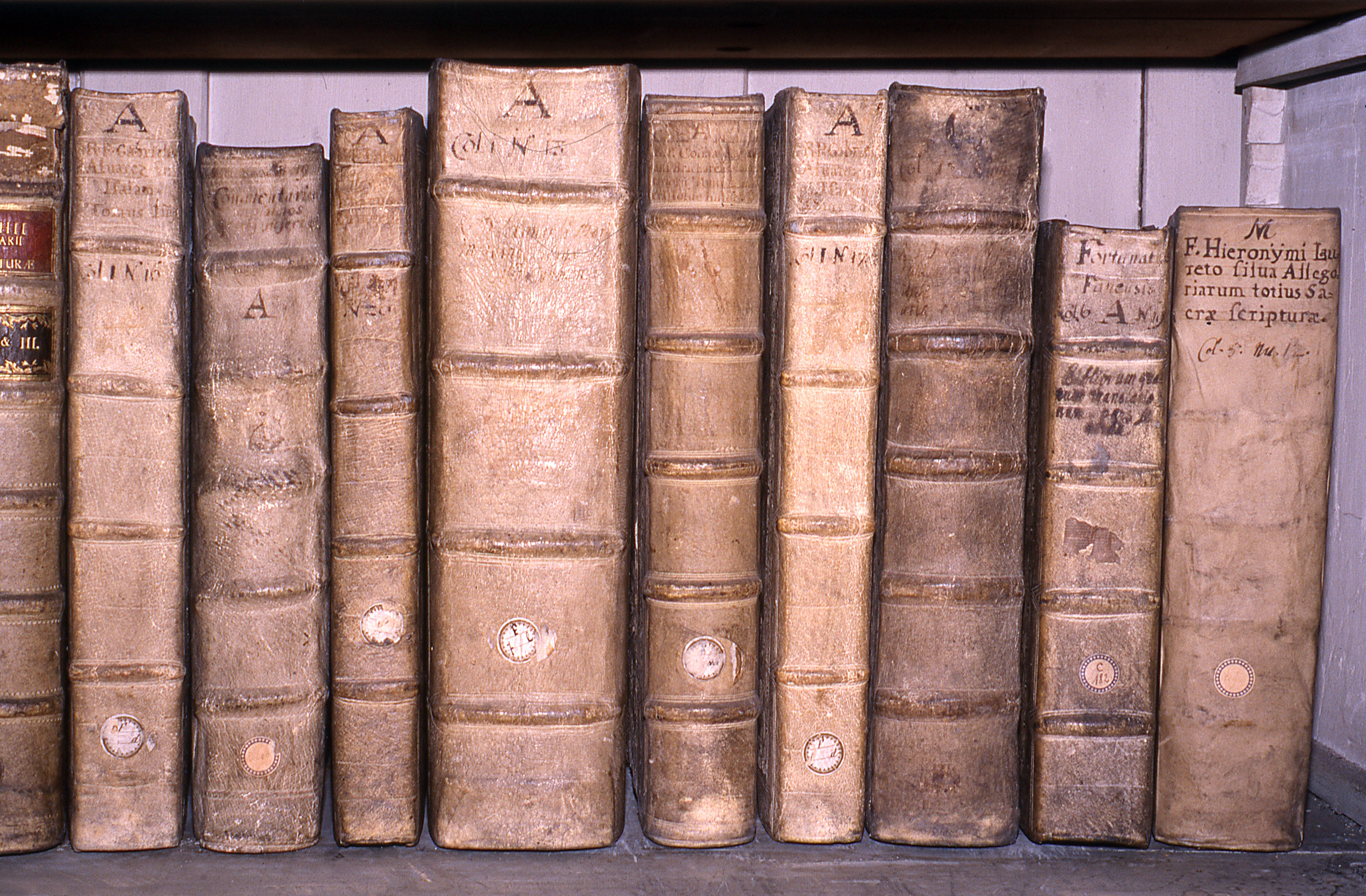
Works from the library of the Grand Séminaire de Strasbourg, bound in Molsheim Charterhouse in the 17th century.

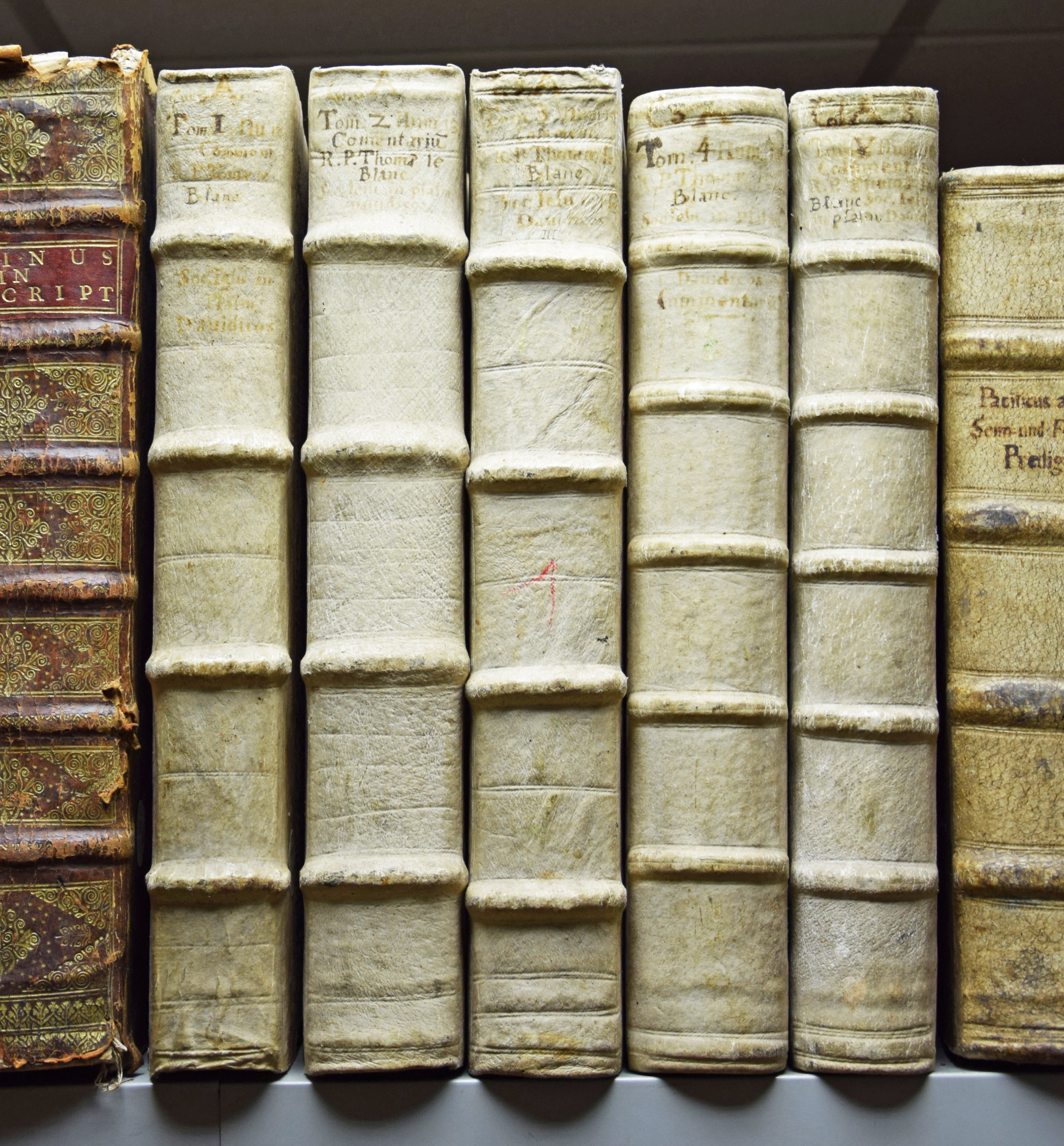
Works from the library of the Redemptorist convent in Bischenberg, acquired by the Musée de la Chartreuse (commentary on the Psalms of David by Thomas Le Blanc (1599-1669)).

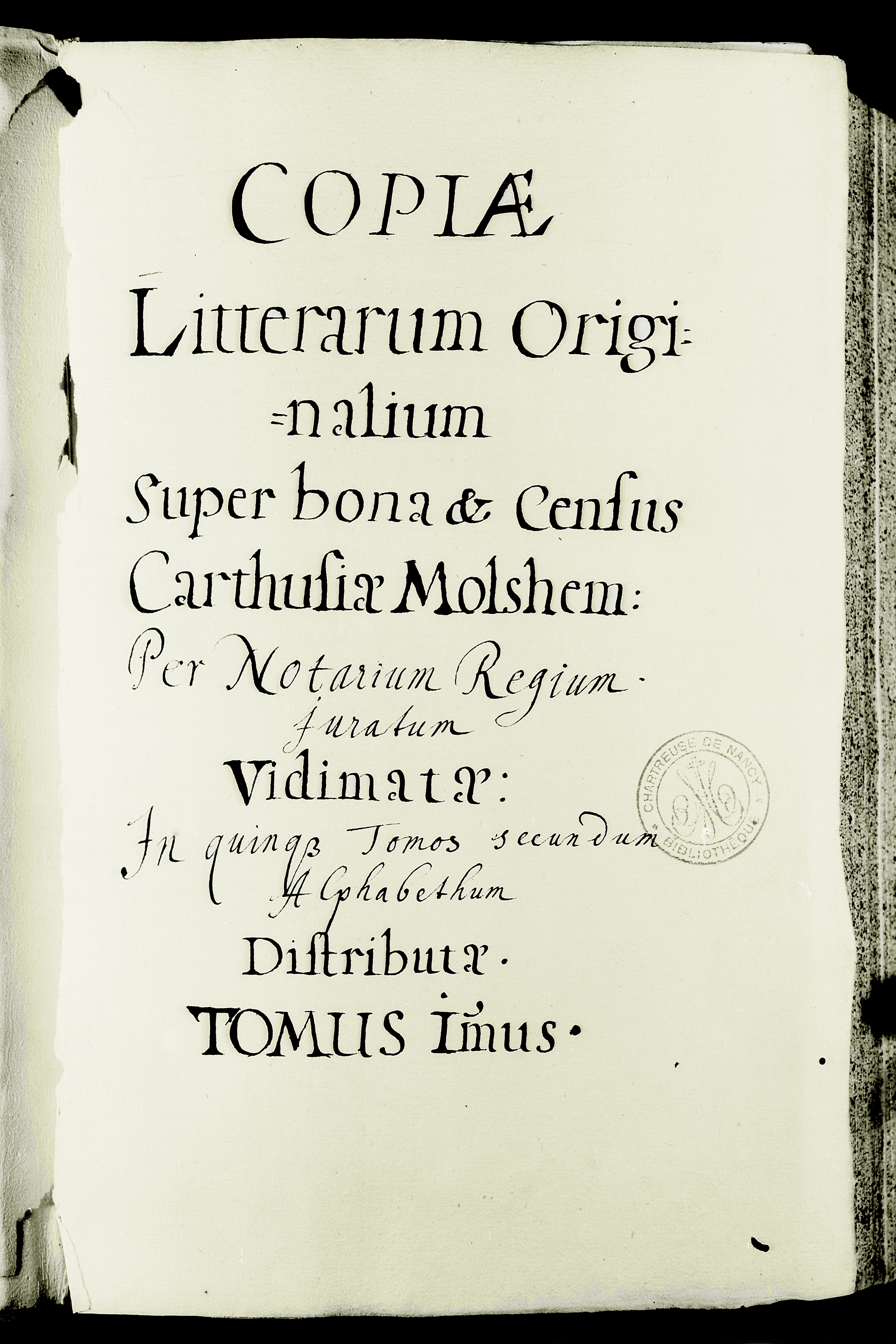
Work from Molsheim Charterhouse, now kept in Pleterje in Slovenia.

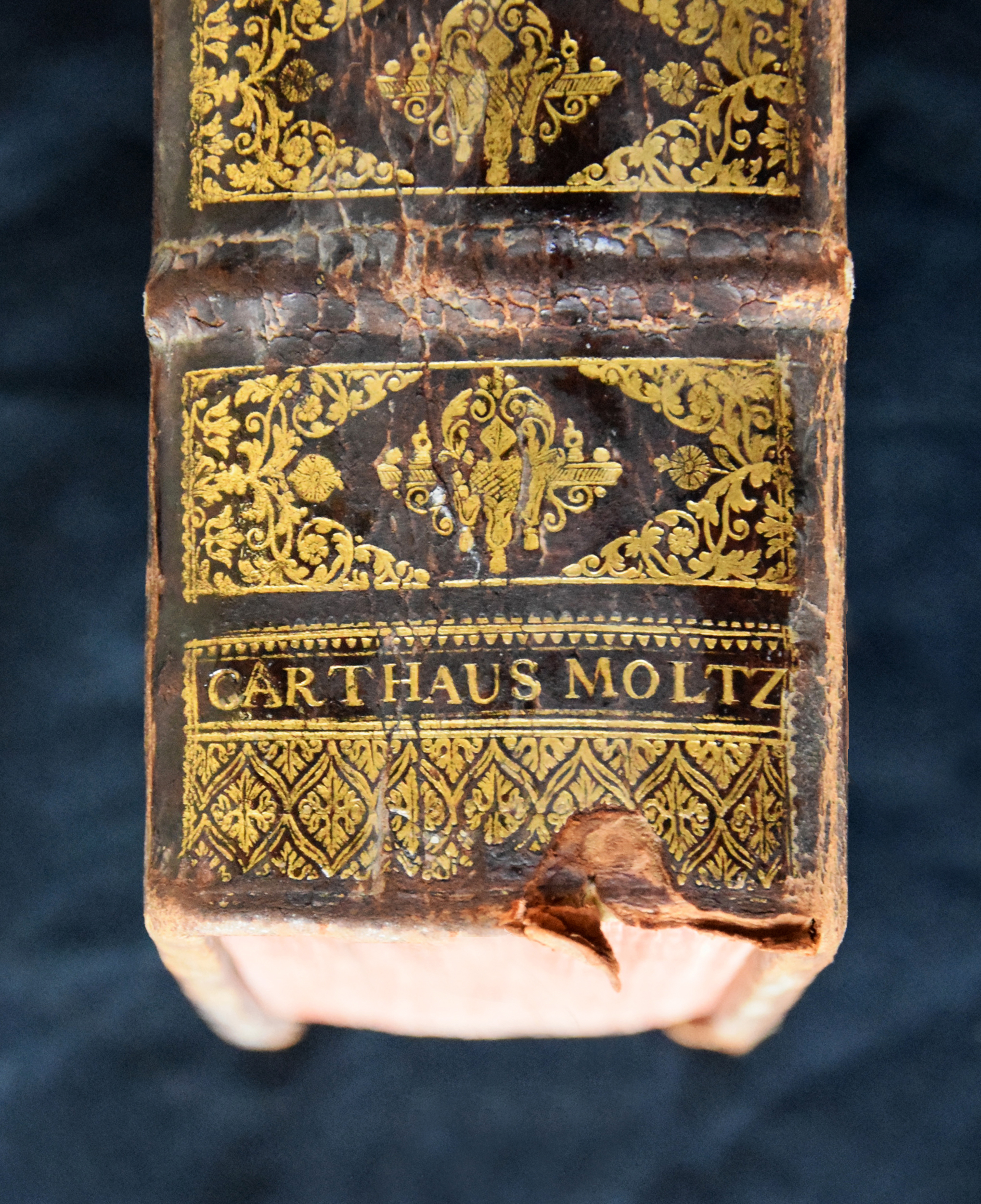
Spine of a book by Jacques Tirin (1723) with the inscription "Carthaus Moltz" ("Molsheim Charterhouse"), now in the museum.

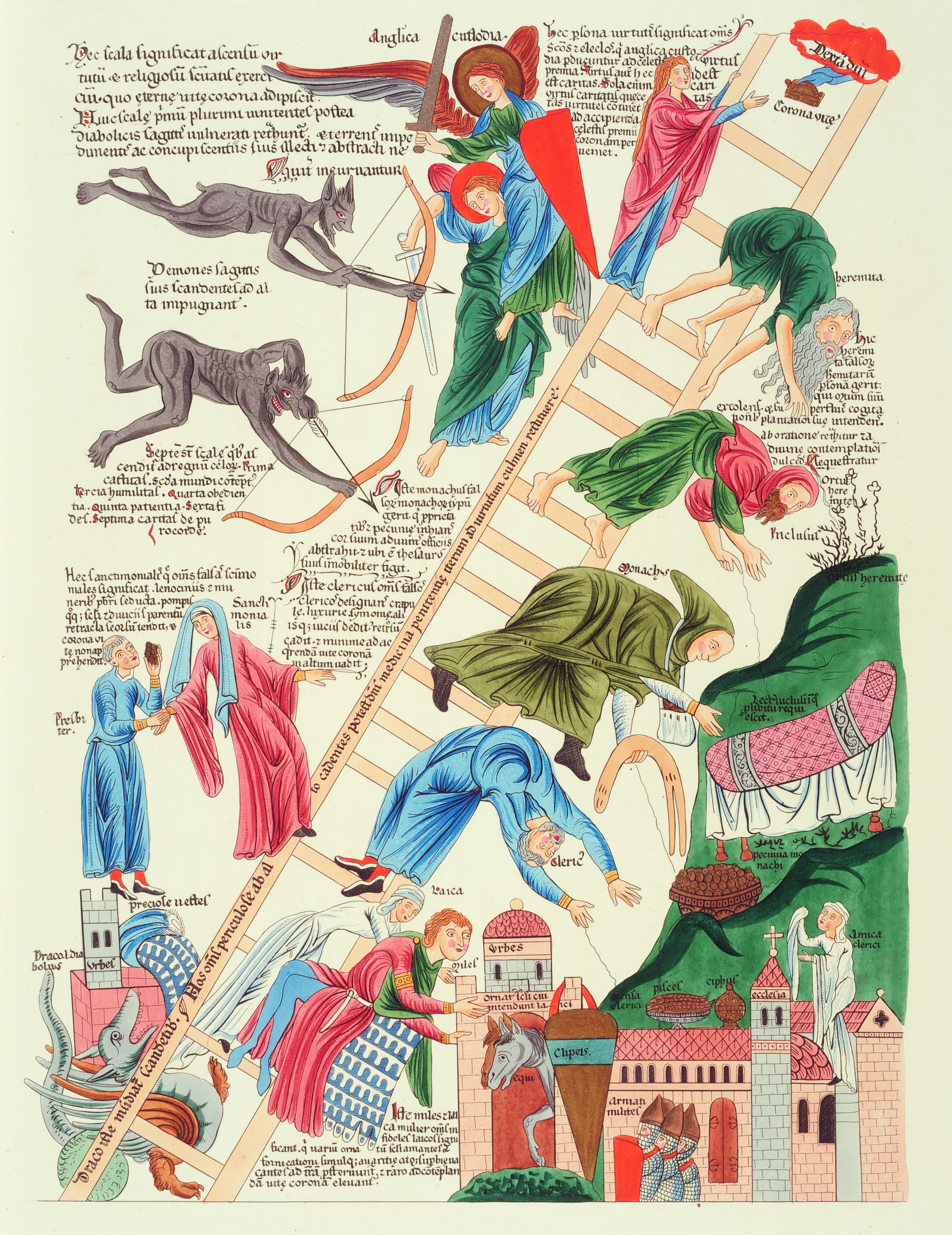
Plate No. IX of the Hortus deliciarum, a copy by Christian Moritz Engelhardt made in 1818, now in the museum.

==== The end of the monastery ====
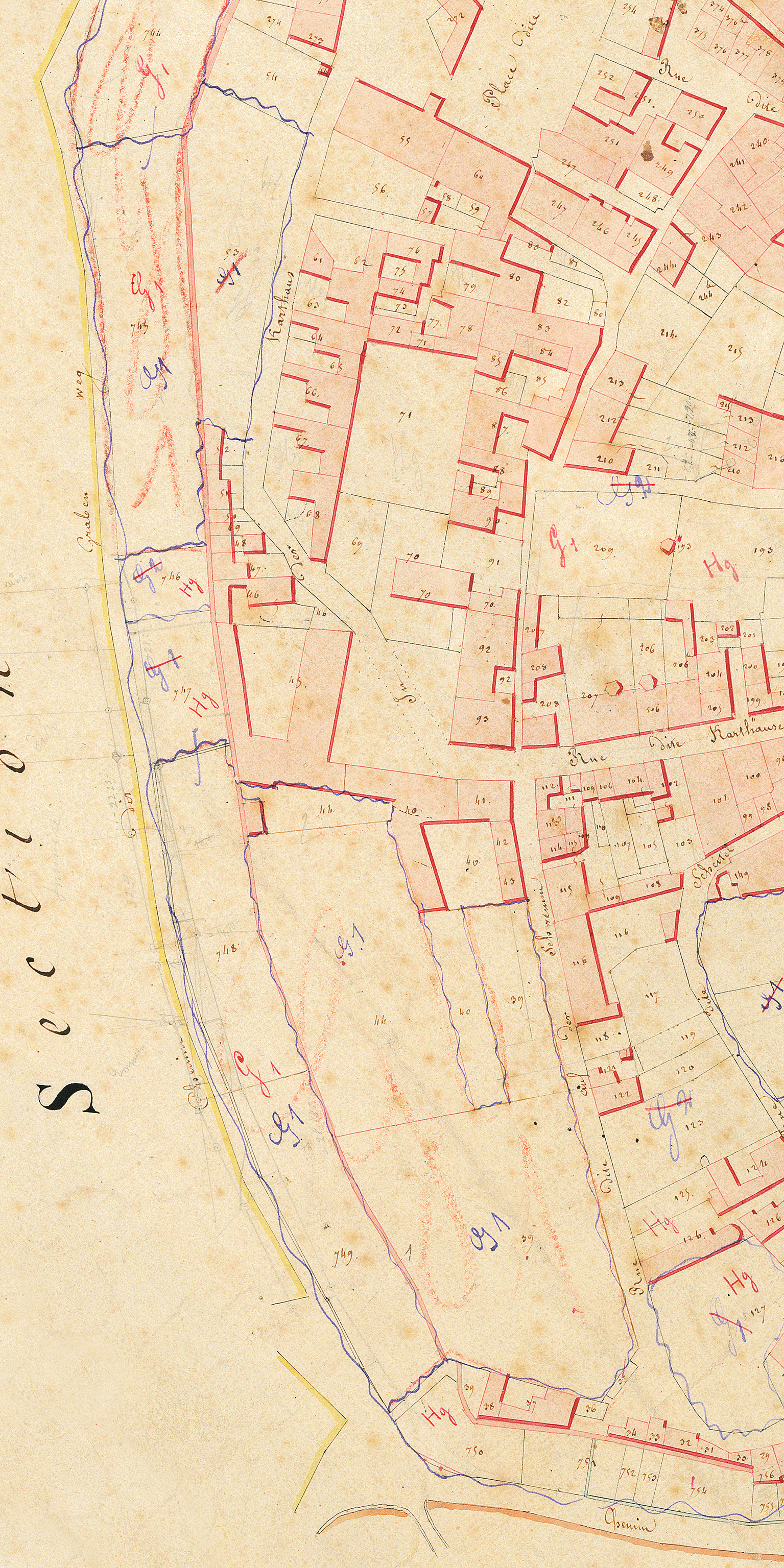
Extract from section F of the Napoleonic cadastral map of Molsheim: the church has already completely disappeared, and the new Rue de la Chartreuse has torn open the northern part of the cells (left).

On July 13, 1790, the public prosecutor of the commune of Molsheim ordered the mayor, Jean-Jacques Belling, rather in favour of the monks, to go and make an inventory of the monastery. The latter complied, accompanied by two municipal agents. This visit was not immediately followed up; on December 23 of the same year, the municipal commission questioned the Carthusian monks about their desire to continue religious life in their monastery. The monks were unanimous in their desire to stay and refused to mix with other monastic orders, which was also proposed to them. On the following March 11, the municipality of Dorlisheim was authorised to take possession of the Moulin de la Chartreuse (120 years later, this mill was bought by Ettore Bugatti, who built his factory there). 11 days after this seizure, Ambroise Müller was the last brother to be buried in the charterhouse graveyard. The first departures took place in the wake of this, with five fathers and one brother leaving the monastery. On July 12, 1791, the order to force the monks to leave was given to the municipality. On August 17, all the gold and silver of the monastery were confiscated to be melted into money. On September 12, a "friend of the Constitution", Joseph Klein, violently denounced the mayor who was too close to the monks for his taste and suggested, not only the expulsion of the Carthusian monks, the renting of the cells and the sale of the stained glass windows, but the transformation of the cloister into a shopping arcade.

On the night of November 23, 1791, an obviously deliberate fire affected the roofs of the church, the library and eight cells. The monastery's critics accused the monks of having caused the fire and had an initial shipment of eight boxes of books and stained glass taken to Strasbourg. On March 21 of the following year, the monks threw in the towel and renounced common life. On May 1, 1792, the charterhouse was suppressed, the monks dispersed and returned for the most part to their home towns. The buildings were declared national property and used as a prison for political prisoners in 1794. On June 15, 1793 (27 Prairial, Year I), "five altars, two iron fences, 96 pieces of mirror glass in the choir, the prie Dieu stalls and other woodwork" were sold and dispersed, along with the exotic trees in the orangery.

The high altar dating from 1672 was sold on 21 May 1793 (2 Prairial Year I) to the municipality of Obernai, which installed it in its parish church. The latter was razed in 1867 to make way for the present-day church of Saints-Pierre-et-Paul; the high altar of the charterhouse was destroyed on this occasion. Similarly, the four large statues of Saints Bruno, John the Baptist, Peter and Paul were acquired by Obernai to embellish the entrance hall of its town hall. Two of the rococo altars from 1769 met the same fate, while the other two were moved to the church of Saint-Antoine in Bernardvillé. The reliquaries were completely stripped of their precious metal covers. The two altars in the sacristy were moved to the church of Saint-Maurice in Bitschhoffen, where they disappeared during the Second World War.

On July 14, 1796 (26 Messidor year IV), the buildings were estimated at 50,400 livres, but already in a state of "considerable disrepair", to the point of having lost a third of their value. The Molsheim miller Jean Geoffroy Augst, the collector Alexis Foccart, the Strasbourg merchant Louis Quinon and the notary André Bremsinger signed the deed of sale of the charterhouse on the 18th of the same month. On 5 Fructidor (22 August), the notary transferred his quarter to Augst. At the end of this exchange, Quinon owned the western part: the recipe, stables, and most of the garden. Foccart owned the centre: guest house, greenhouse and the rest of the garden. Finally, Augst acquired the eastern part, including the church, the cells, the prior's house and the kitchen wing. The church was very quickly used as a stone quarry, and the cells were sold as individual houses to private individuals from year VI to year VIII (1798-1800).

=== The future of the former monastery ===
At the beginning of the 19th century, the two cells I and S were ruined. On December 21, 1807, Augst sold the old kitchens to Léonard Rubé, a café owner, for 5,472 francs. In the three months that followed, the entrance gallery to the church, known as the atrium, the brothers' cloister and the fathers' refectory were demolished. In 1809, the prior's house, the probable residence of Jean Geoffroy Augst, was cleared and the Rue de la Chartreuse was opened in place of the old conventual buildings. On January 8, 1830, Alexis Foccart acquired Louis Quinon's share, which he sold eight years later to the Muckensturm couple. On October 1, 1842, the property was acquired by the town of Molsheim, which turned it into a hospice (which became a local hospital). Alexis Foccart's brother, Louis Éloi (1772-1855), housed his large family (six children) in the former guesthouse. Claudine Foccart, a descendant of Louis Éloi, used "a large bundle of scrolls dating from the 14th to the 18th century, left over from the Carthusian archives [as] an apron or to cover jam jars". The Foccarts sold their property at auction in 1853. The building opposite was bought by the widow Jenner on August 21, 1867, to house the beneficiaries of her foundation, i.e. destitute widows.

La chartreuse avant les campagnes de restauration

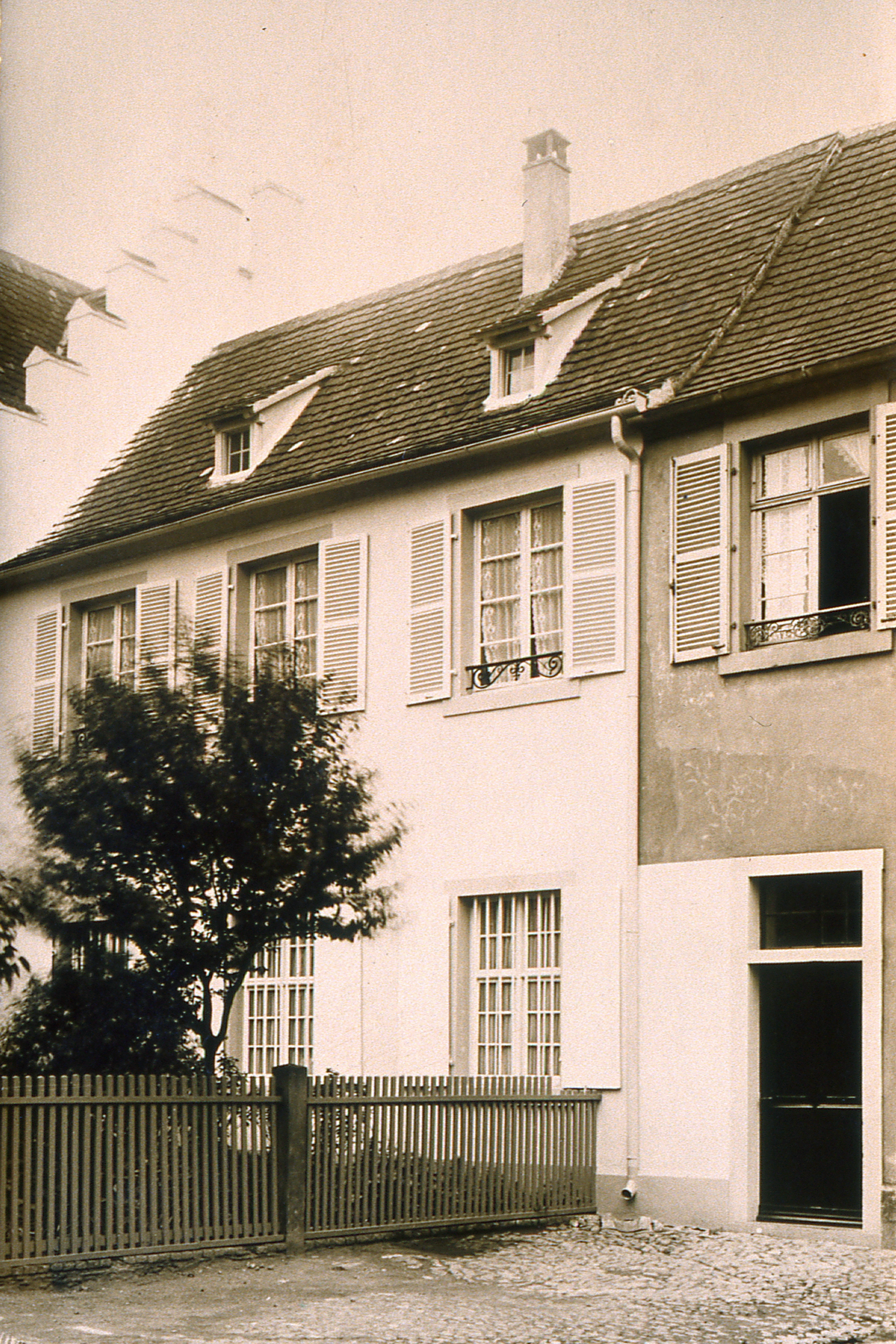
The kitchen wing at the beginning of the 20th century.

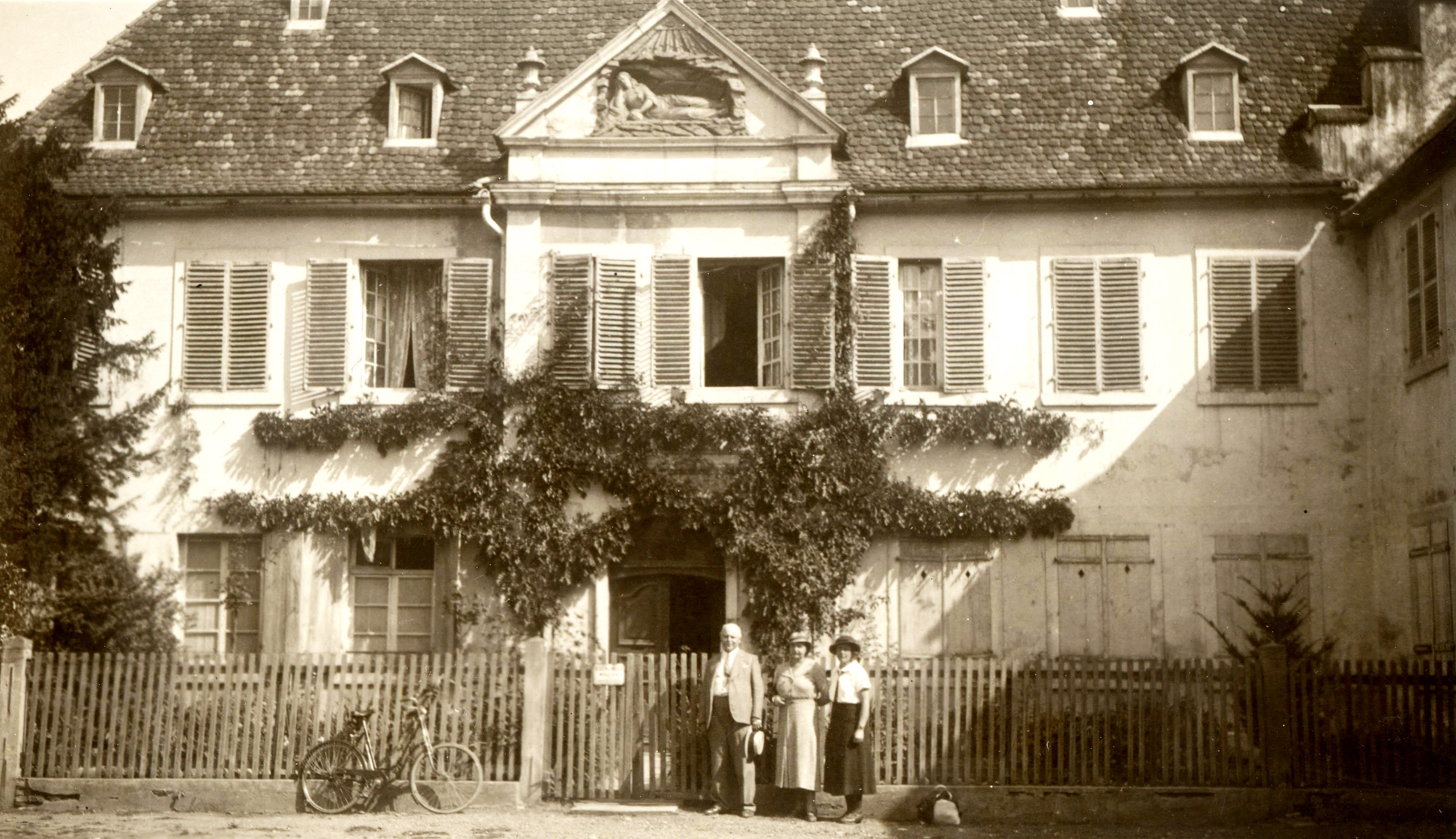
The prior's house, then owned by the Gerlinger family, in 1934.

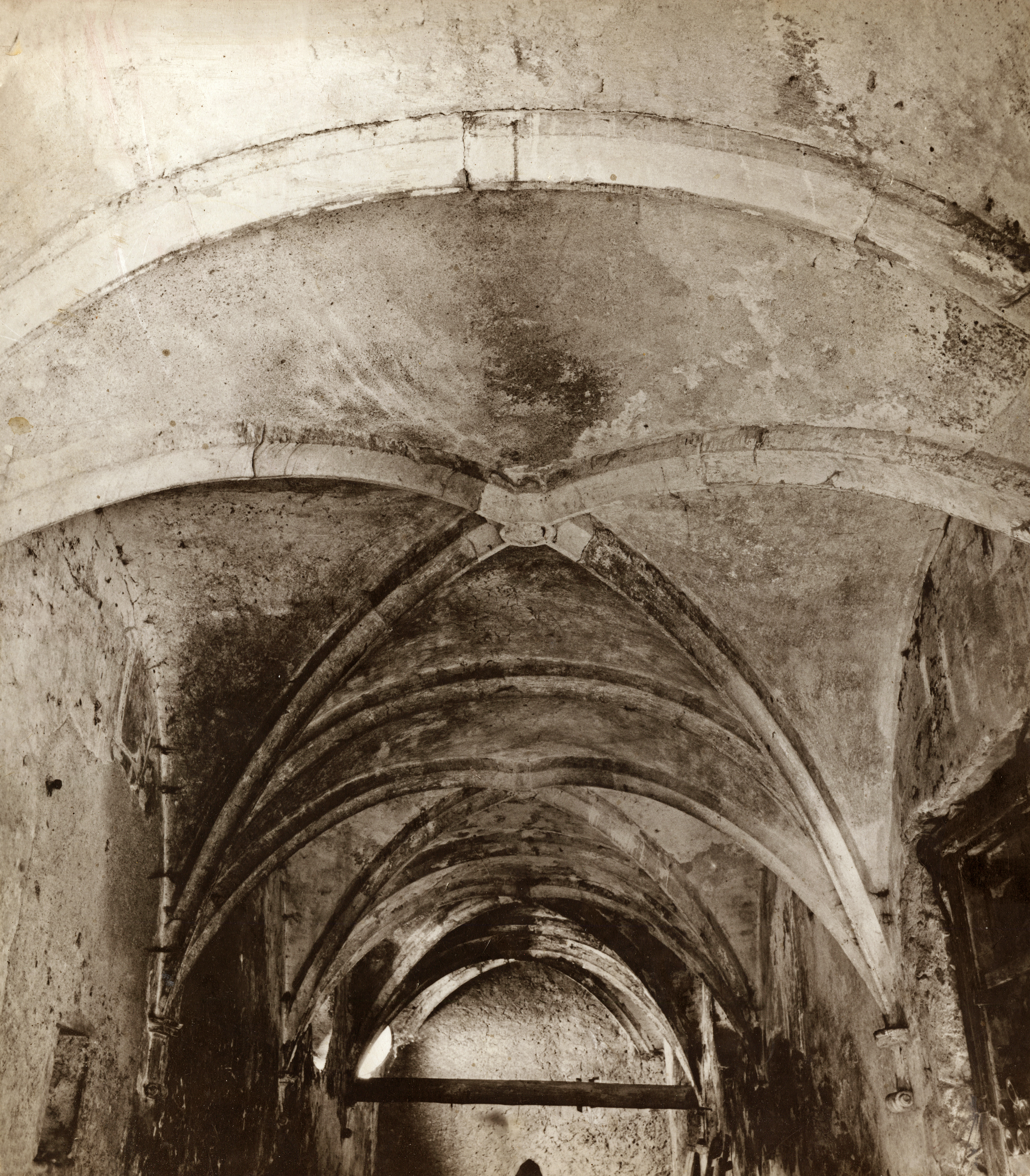
The cloister vaults, north side, in 1972.

=== Rehabilitation and ranking ===
In 1980, the town of Molsheim began to take an interest in the heritage represented by the charterhouse. By a vote of the town council on December 12 of that year, a first purchase was decided upon, with the acquisition of the Gerlinger house, i.e. the former prior's house, which, with its outbuildings, makes up a total of 2,779 square metres of land. This was followed by 15 more purchases between 1981 and 2009, with the total of 16 purchases bringing together 7,097 square metres.

From 1987, the Molsheim sculptor Raymond Keller launched a rehabilitation programme carried out by volunteers. 48 people worked on the site, devoting an estimated total of 75,000 hours of work. The result of this work was the rehabilitation of six cells, three gardens, and the north and south wings of the cloister.

The monastery, after a first registration in the supplementary inventory on June 9, 1989, was classified as a historic monument on March 23, 1998. The classified parts are partly communal property, the rest belonging to the local hospital; the protected elements are all the remains and the floors. In 2005, the international congress of the Analecta Cartusiana took place here.

== Architecture ==
=== From the time of the monks ===
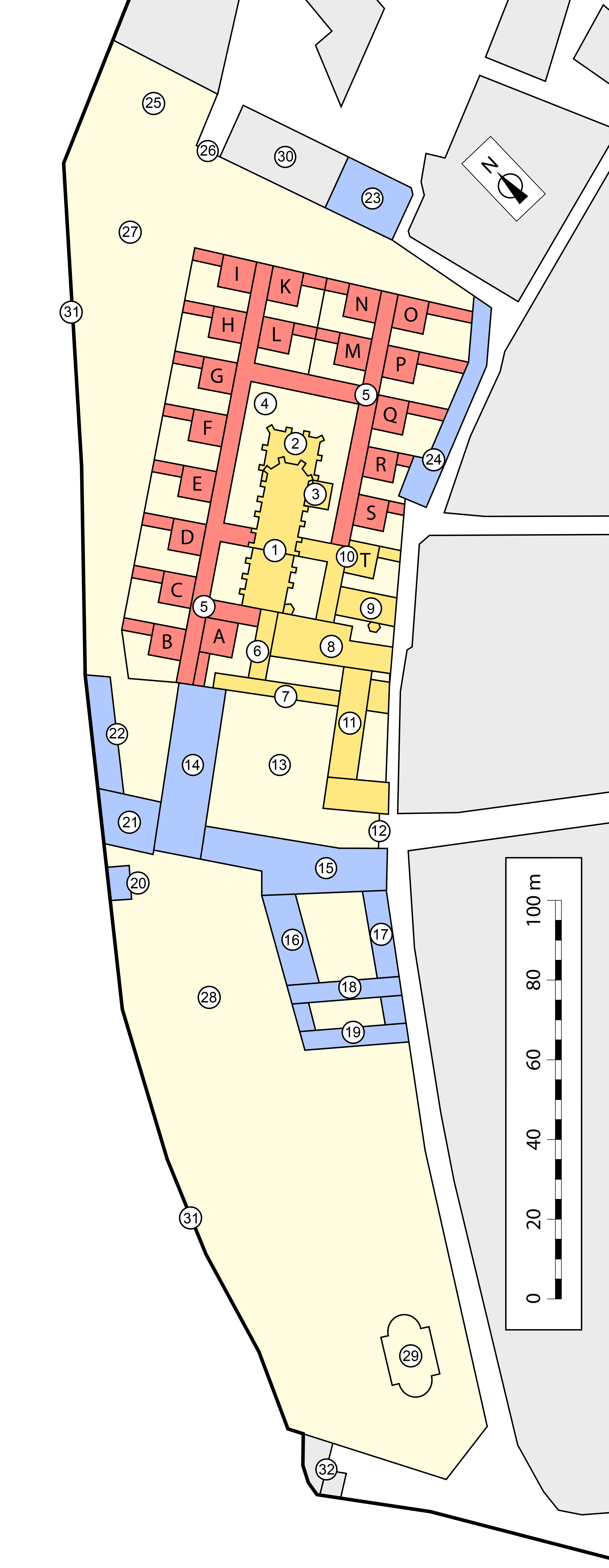
General plan of the charterhouse. eremitic buildings (cells and cloister) community buildings (church, priory, refectory, kitchen, etc.) temporal buildings (revenue, hotel, farm, etc.): 1. Convent church (1608-1609). 2. Sacristy. 3. Chapter house (1623-1626). 4. Cemetery and large cross. 5. Fathers' cloister (1614-1626). 6. Atrium (1700-1701). 7. Cloister of the brothers (1700-1701). 8. Prior's house, known as the "priory of the Charterhouse" (early 18th century). 9. Fathers' refectory (1614.) 10. Rasure and library, former cell T. 11. Kitchen wing and brothers' rooms (early 18th century). 12. Main entrance. 13. Courtyard of honour, known as "the Carthusian monks". 14. Cellar and guesthouse (1699-1701). 15. Reception wing (1701). 16. Carpentry, smithy, locksmith's shop and servants' wing. 17. Stables. 18. Stables. 19. Sheds. 20. Greenhouse (17th century). 21. Press (early 18th century). 22. Distillery and vinegar factory. 23. Back cellar (early 18th century). 24. Shed and outbuildings. 25. Mount of Olives. 26. Porte cochere. 27. Orchard. 28. Gardens and kitchen garden. 29. Fishpond. [Outside the convent] 30. Sunday house of the Grand Chapter. 31. City wall. 32. Powder Tower (or Pulverturm)

Between 1598 and 1792, the charterhouse occupied an area of eleven arpents and 742 square feet, i.e., with a foot of 29.3 centimetres and an arpent of 24,000 square feet, an area of approximately 22,700 square metres in modern measurements. It thus occupied about 8% of the urban space of Molsheim. The monastery was divided into two parts. The part to the south-west, where the modern local hospital is located, contained the temporal buildings and spaces: farm, reception building and guesthouse. To the north-east was the church, surrounded by the two cloisters of the fathers and brothers, themselves surrounded by the monks' cells. Around the present "Cour des Chartreux", on the east and south sides, were grouped the places of collective life: church, library, refectory, kitchen. The community aspect remained relative, however, as the fathers and brothers had different access to it.

==== The church ====
The layout of the church in the heart of the courtyard is quite unusual and contrasts with the general Carthusian practice of "large cloister" (fathers) and "small cloister" (brothers).

A Carthusian church is generally a relatively sober building of limited dimensions. The church in Molsheim was an exception to this rule. About thirty-five metres long and eight metres wide, it was also richly decorated, the initial ornamentation being constantly completed and enriched until the Revolution. On September 2, 1606, Adam Peetz, auxiliary bishop of Strasbourg during the lay administration of Leopold V of Austria-Tyrol, laid the foundation stone on the site of the main altar. The construction of a church in this location required a great deal of consolidation of the soil, as a wooden foundation was necessary. The abbot of Altorf donated the trees needed for this consolidation, "as many as necessary".

==== Outdoors ====
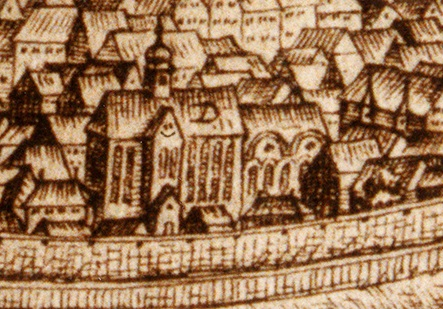
The monastic church in 1644 (extract from a drawing by Jean-Jacques Arhardt)

After its completion, the church, with a single nave, had a very unusual plan. The nave, which is relatively short and was intended for the brothers, has only four bays, twelve metres in length with a surface area of about 95 square metres, while the choir, with five bays and the apse, with a length of twenty-one metres and a surface area of about one hundred and sixty square metres, represents two thirds of the space. Between the nave and the choir a high rood screen divided the church in two. The main door, with two leaves, pierced in the western façade, was that of the brothers. The fathers, on the other hand, had two small doors on either side of the choir, allowing them to go directly to their cells after services, using the north and south galleries of the cloister.

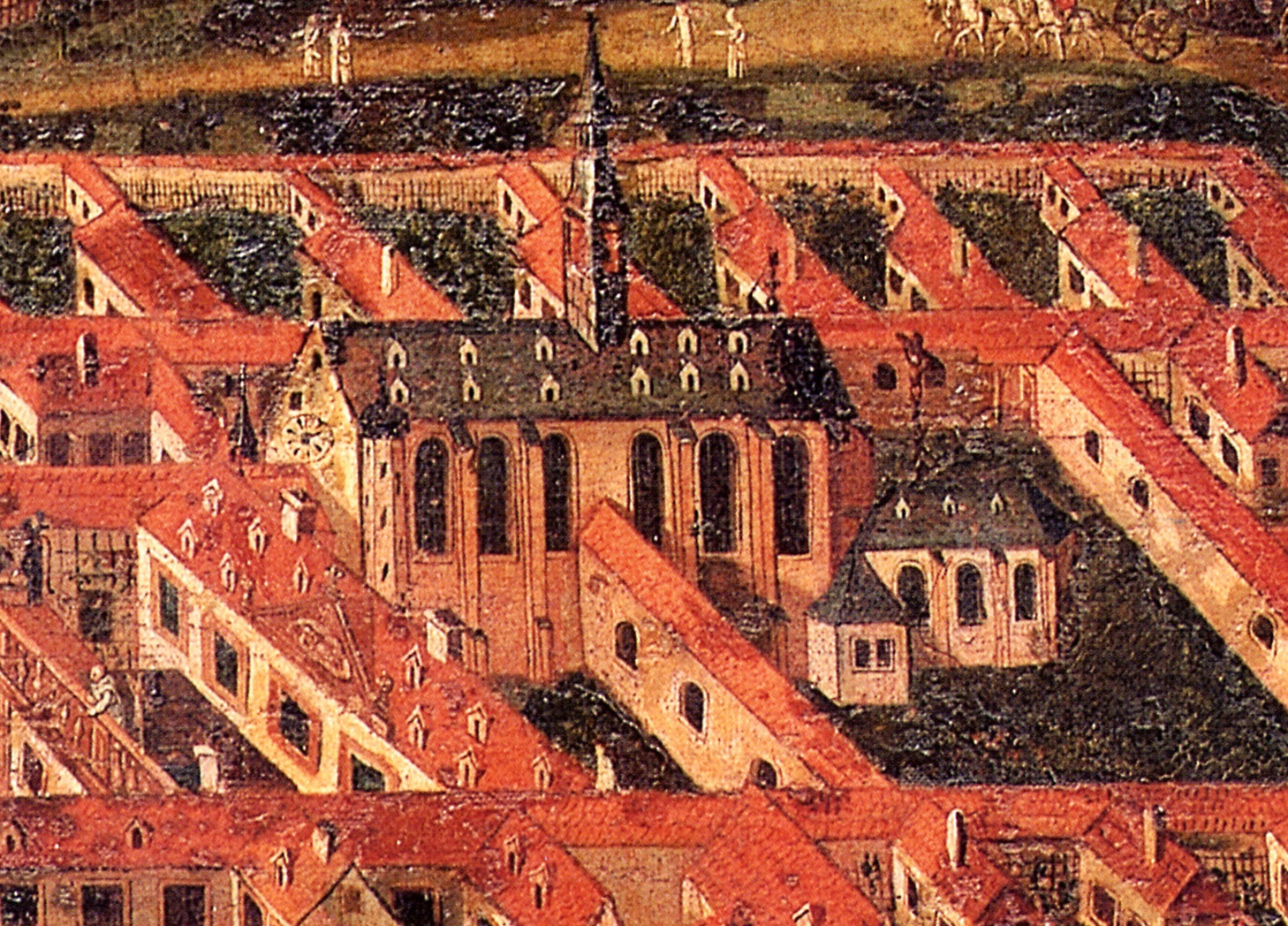
The monastic church, (detail of the anonymous painting of 1744)

In terms of elevation, although much more compact, the Carthusian church was not unlike the general appearance of the Jesuit church. It was quite tall in silhouette and was illuminated by large glass windows and, perhaps, by a rose window on the south-west façade. Unlike the tiled roofs of the rest of the monastery, the church's roof was covered with grey slate. In 1644, a high gable topped each access gallery to the choir on either side of the choir. These two gables disappeared at the end of the 17th century or the beginning of the 18th century.

Between the southern front of the church and the eastern front of the prior's house, a pentagonal turret covered by a bulbous bell tower gave access to the gallery and the attic. Above the choir was a hexagonal bell tower, also with a bulbous tower, according to the engraving of 1644. In contrast, the works of 1744 show the bell tower with a slightly domed dome topped by a slimmer bell tower and finished with a spire. On the main façade, a statue of the Virgin was placed; in 1659, it was replaced by a wooden statue of Saint Michael which after suffering deterioration from the weather, was replaced in 1701.

==== Interior design ====
In 1609, the church was adorned with five altars that the monks had managed to bring back from their first monastery at Koenigshoffen. A Gothic altarpiece, dating from 1460-1475 and enriched with a polychrome representation of the Passion of Christ, was also recovered and installed in the church at Molsheim.

Two additional altars were placed in the brothers' choir and consecrated on August 10, 1614, one to Saint John in the north and the other to Saint Stephen in the south; they also came from Koenigshoffen, and were installed under the rood screen, framing the door that allows access to the fathers' choir. Between the altars is a silver statue of the Virgin and Child. Above the two altars, on the rood screen itself, are two altars of the Virgins, to the north, and of Saint Anne, to the south. In the fathers' choir, two rows of carved stalls were placed in 1619, each interrupted by a lectern. In 1624, a lectern was acquired and placed in the choir. The windows in the apse were installed in 1635, decorated with figurative stained glass by Brother Martin, a monk at Freiburg Charterhouse.

The Treaties of Westphalia in 1648 put an end to the Thirty Years' War; the end of the hostilities marked a resumption of the church's decoration programmes. In 1652, the Protestant sculptor Samuel Klock created the brothers' choir stalls, which were decorated with paintings depicting the Passion of Christ. The last stalls, intended for visitors, were made by the same craftsman in 1653 and painted by Father Werner Hammacher or Hammenmacher, who was a monk at Molsheim from 1640 to 1686. An iron grate was also added in 1652, made by the master locksmith of the city of Strasbourg to separate the nave between the "brothers' choir" and the "secular benches", the latter being open to the rest of the monastery's inhabitants. In 1664, a sixth altar, dedicated to the three kings, was consecrated on the rood screen, between the altars installed in 1614.

The bequest of Father Matthieu Reis, who died on March 9, 1672, allowed the commissioning of a new high altar from Jean-Christophe Feinlein, a cabinetmaker in Waldshut on the Rhine above Basel. This work cost the monks 2,500 florins and required sixteen months of work from July 1672 to November of the following year. It was transported by boat and then by cart before being installed and consecrated on December 11, 1673. A large canvas was donated to the monastery by Franz-Egon of Fürstenberg, bishop of Strasbourg, to decorate this high altar. It depicts the Virgin and Child and was painted in Cologne. The painting is framed by four Corinthian columns, which support a baldachin similar to the one in the abbey church of Ebersmunster. Also in 1672, four large statues representing Saints Bruno, John the Baptist, Peter and Paul were installed around this altar. The baldachin was modified by Prior Philip Zell between 1692 and 1715; he added two columns, moved the statues of Peter and Paul and completed six pyramidal reliquaries.

Between 1686 and 1692, Prior Conrad Odendal had a wainscot installed to cover the upper part of the wall above the choir stalls, which required the work of two sculptors and four carpenters. This use of panelling was very popular in Alsatian churches at that time. After this last decoration campaign, the Carthusian church had twenty-four paintings, twenty-three wooden statues and twenty-six groups of two columns. The consoles supporting these pairs of columns are carved in imitation of cherub heads; above the paintings were angels with outstretched wings. It was also Conrad Odendal who replaced the original lectern with a new one, depicting an angel carrying the lectern.

The paintings in the nave, the brothers' choir, depicted the mysteries of the Incarnation and the Infancy of Jesus, and the beginnings of the Carthusian Order. The paintings beyond the rood screen depicted the Passion of Christ, and the statues were of the Evangelists and Apostles. In 1696, the Benedictine monk Thierry Ruinart judged the church to be "decorated with great taste, with very valuable paintings and other ornaments". Later, some final modifications were made in the 18th century, with the installation of four new rococo altars in 1769; a wrought iron grille, the work of Jean-Baptiste Pertois, was installed at the entrance to the choir.

Elements from the former Carthusian church

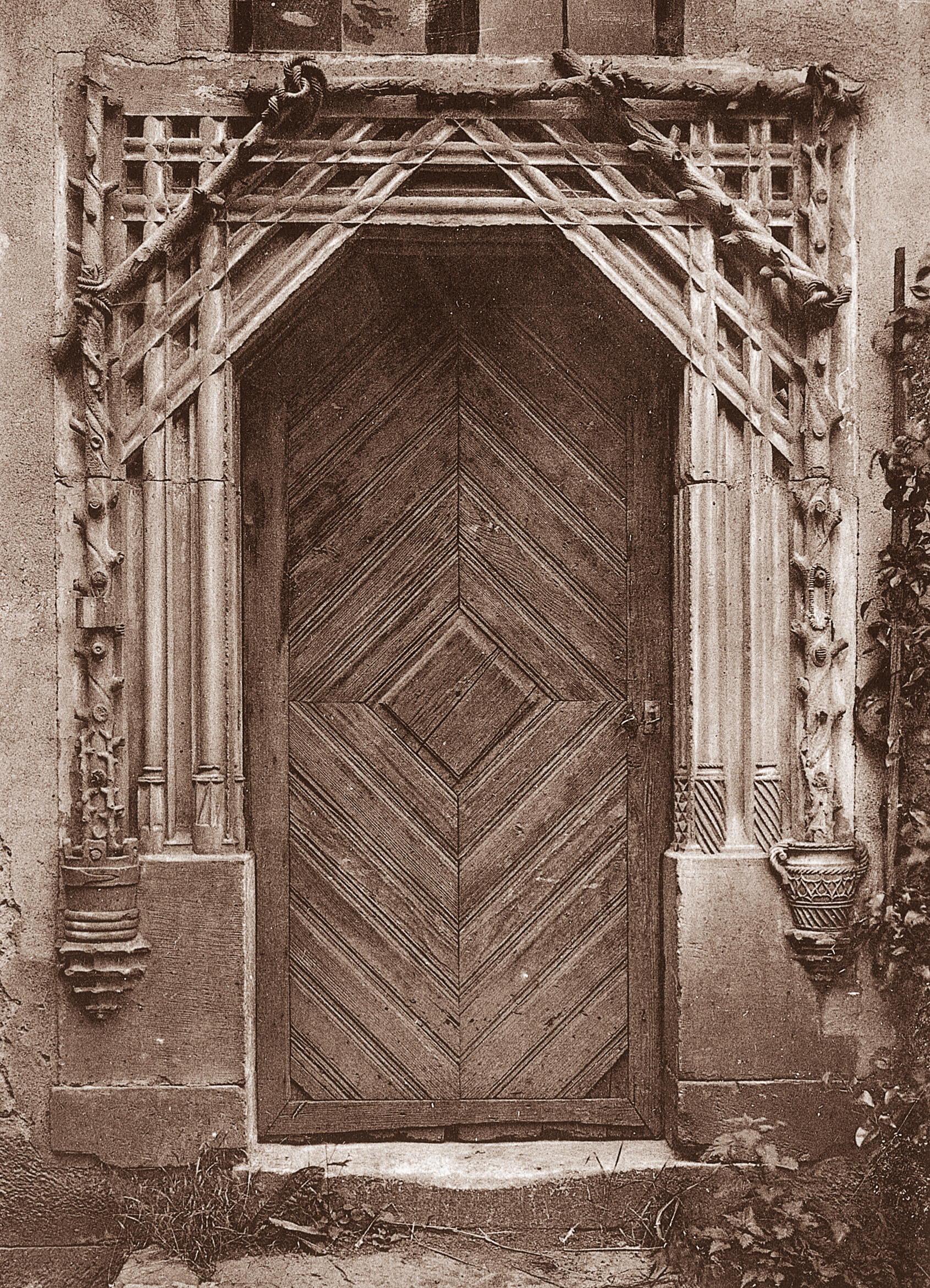
One of the former Gothic portals of the charterhouse of Koenigshoffen, then of Molsheim, in branchwork style.

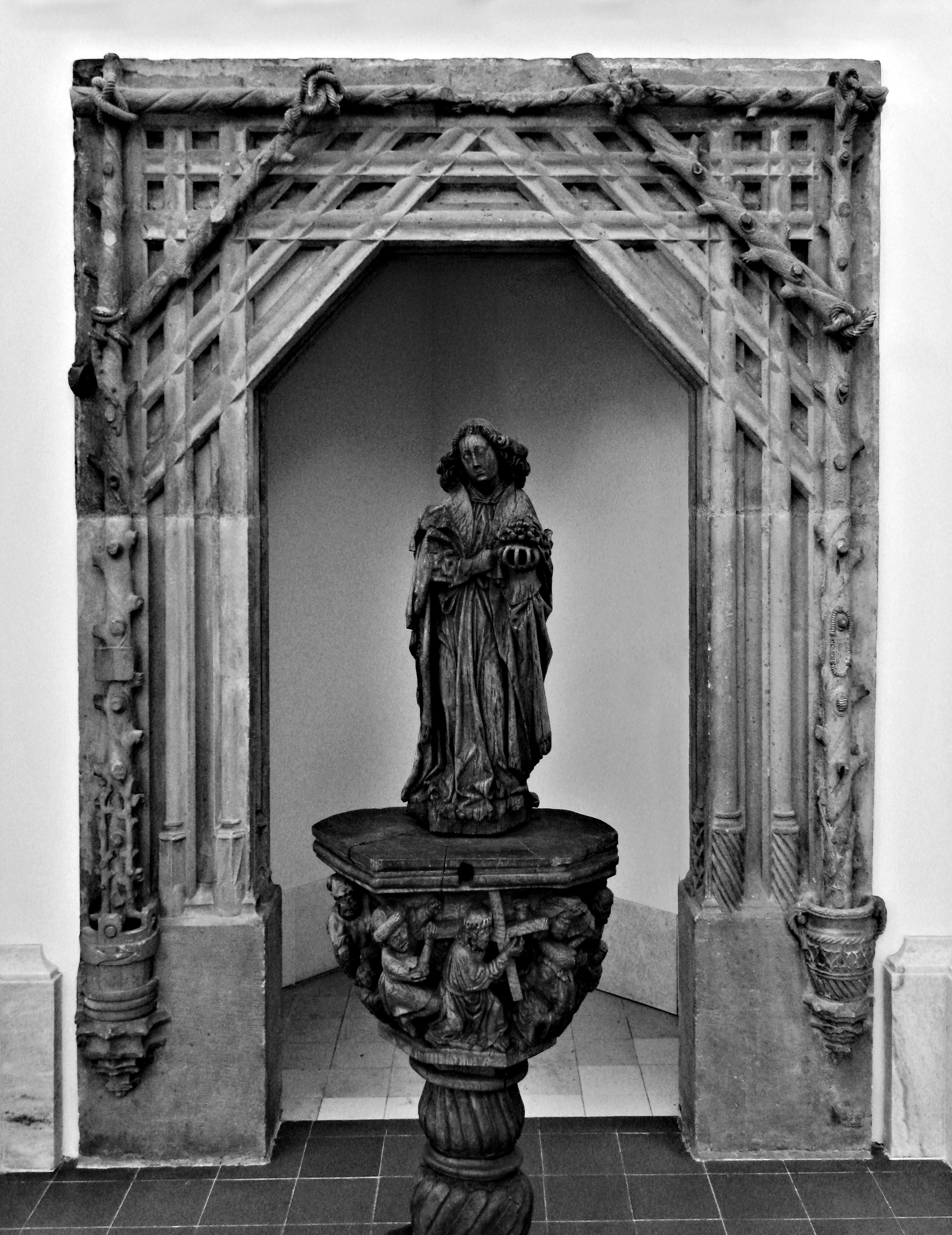
The same portal is now in the Bode-Museum in Berlin.

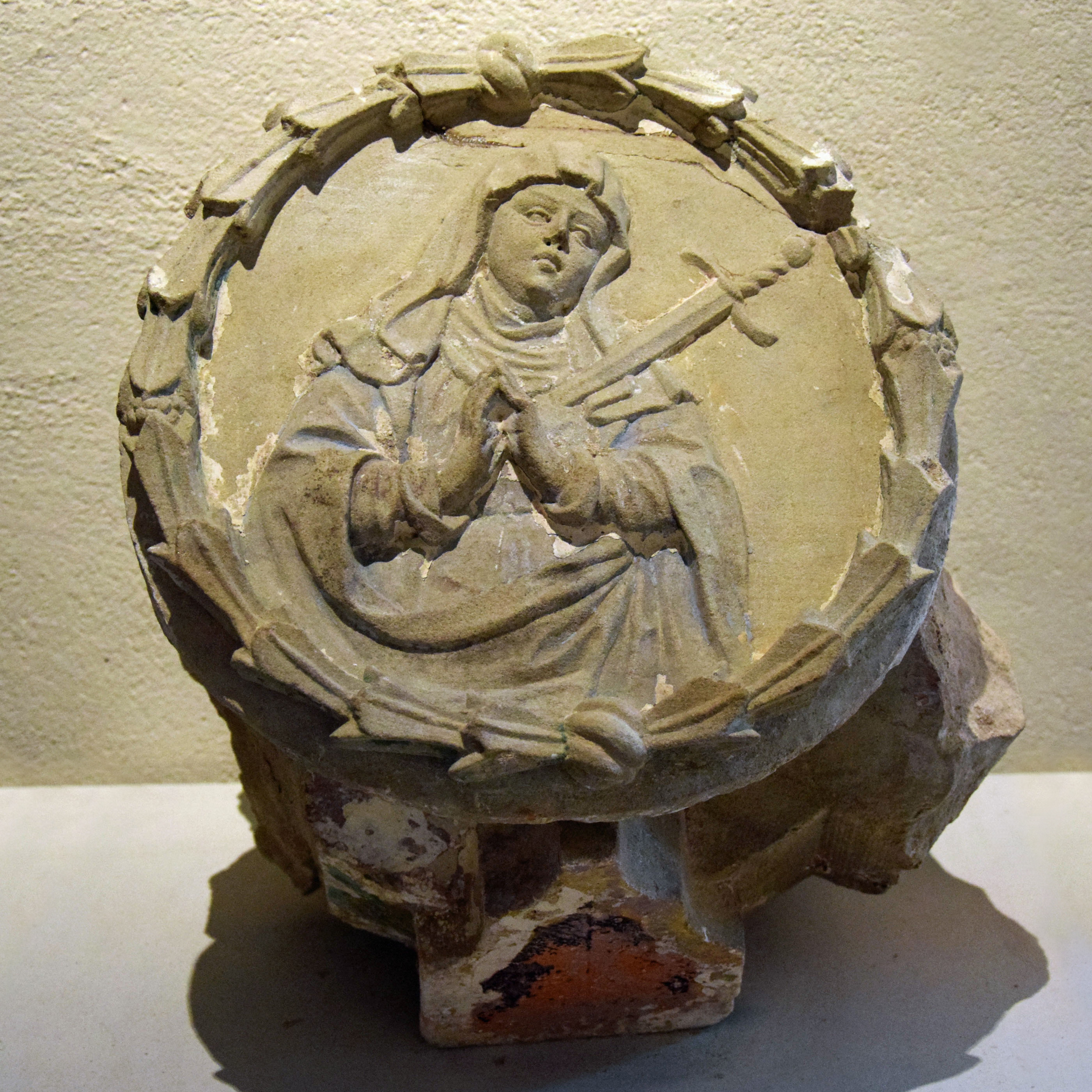
A keystone of the church decorated with a Virgin of Sorrows.

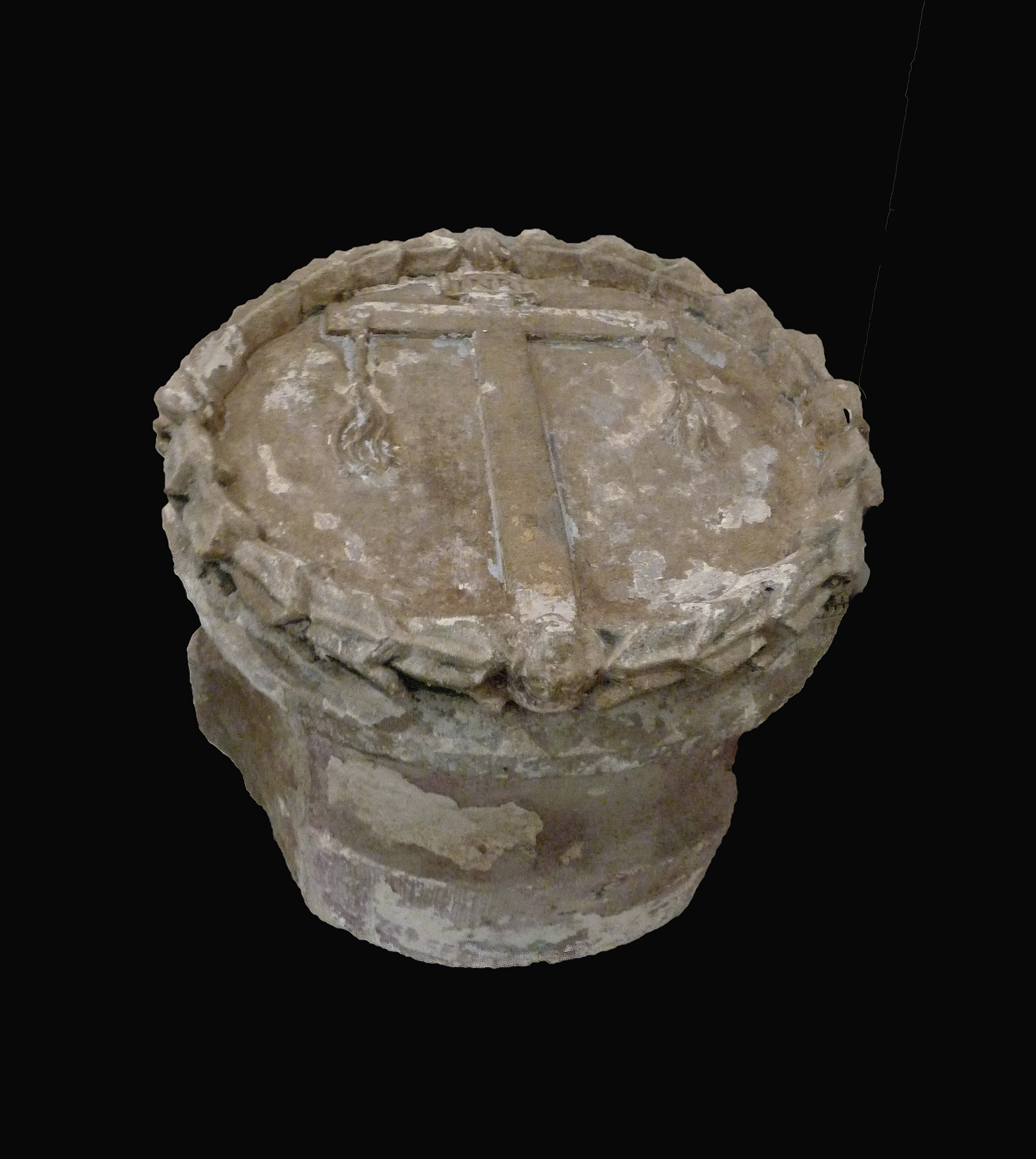
Another keystone in the church, stamped with a cross.

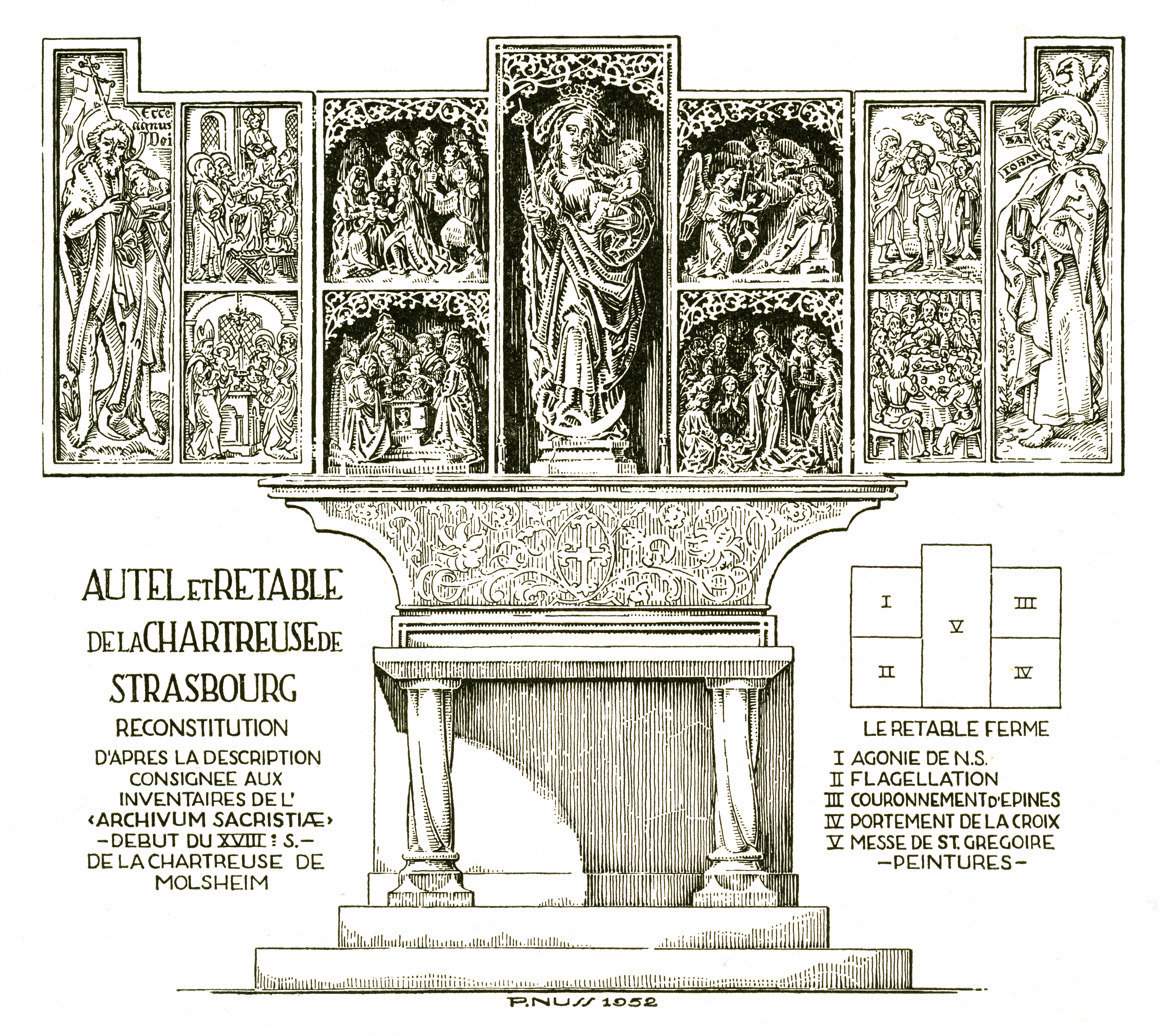
The Koenigshoffen altarpiece, in late Gothic style, depicting the Virgin Mary surrounded by the Adoration of the Magi, the Circumcision, the Annunciation and the Nativity.

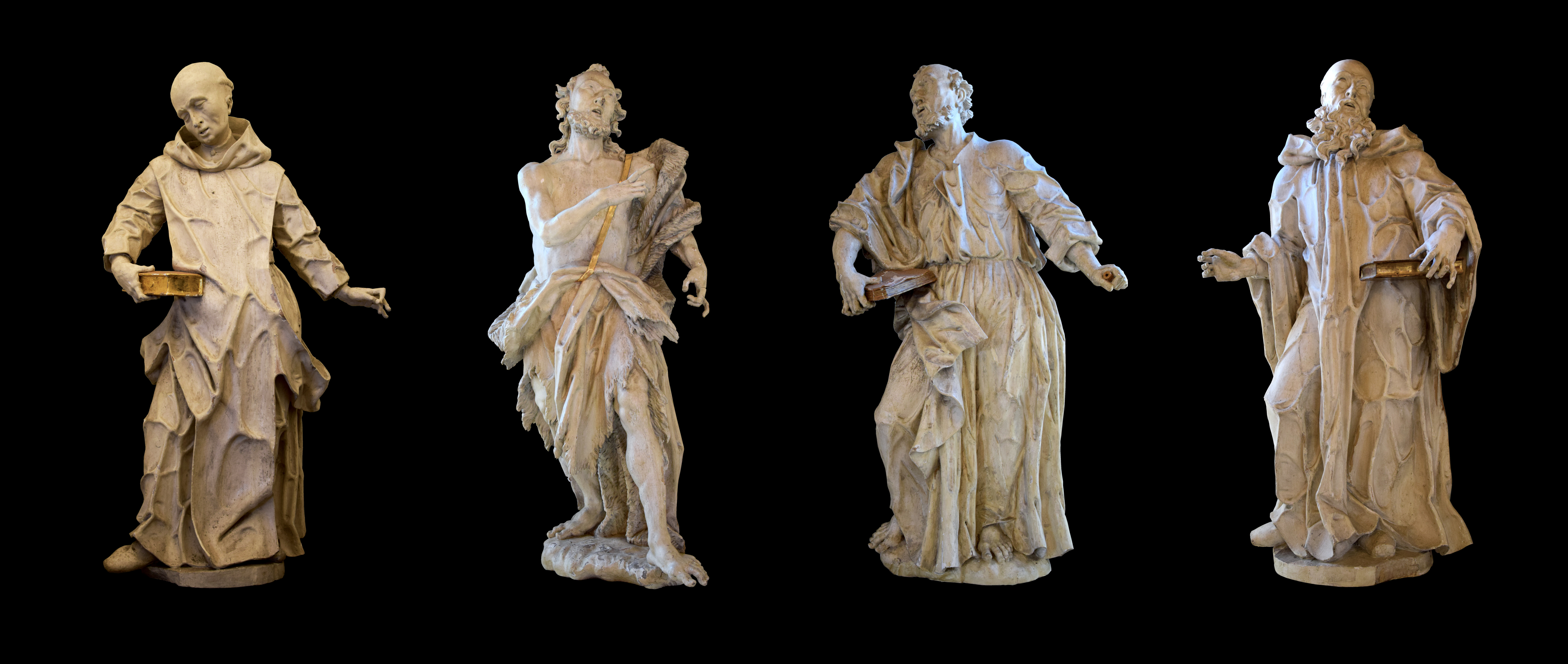
The four monumental statues of Saint Bruno, Saint John the Baptist, Saint Peter and Saint Paul.

==== The courtyard and its buildings ====
On three sides, the monastic church was surrounded by the courtyard delimited by the cloister of the fathers; on the west side only, it came up against the prior's house. This courtyard was also the site of the monks' graveyard, the sacristy and the chapter house. The sacristy, a fairly low, square-shaped building, was built around the apse of the church. It was built at the same time as the sanctuary and incorporated the buttresses of the choir. Two secondary altars were installed in this sacristy, the first dedicated to Saint Bruno, Saint Anthelm of Belley and Saint Hugh of Lincoln, the second to Saint Hugh of Grenoble, the three archangels Michael, Gabriel and Raphael, as well as to Saints Anthelm and Hugh of Lincoln.

The chapter house was also adjacent to the church, adjoining the apse and sacristy on the southern side of the fathers' choir. In keeping with the relatively small number of fathers, the chapter house is a very small room, smaller than a monk's cell (about 6 × 4 metres). The thin walls show that there is no vault. Despite its small size, the room still contains an altar dedicated to the Holy Cross. In addition, Brother Martin of Freiburg painted the altar, which was enriched with a crucifix donated by the Abbot of Altorf in 1648. In 1688, Prior Conrad Odendal, who did not think the previous decoration was up to scratch, had the walls of the hall covered with painted panelling and a fresco depicting the Last Judgement, which was itself framed with paintings. Near the altar, two other paintings were placed, one depicting the Grande Chartreuse, the other the first site of the latter.

The Carthusian monastery courtyard and the cemetery

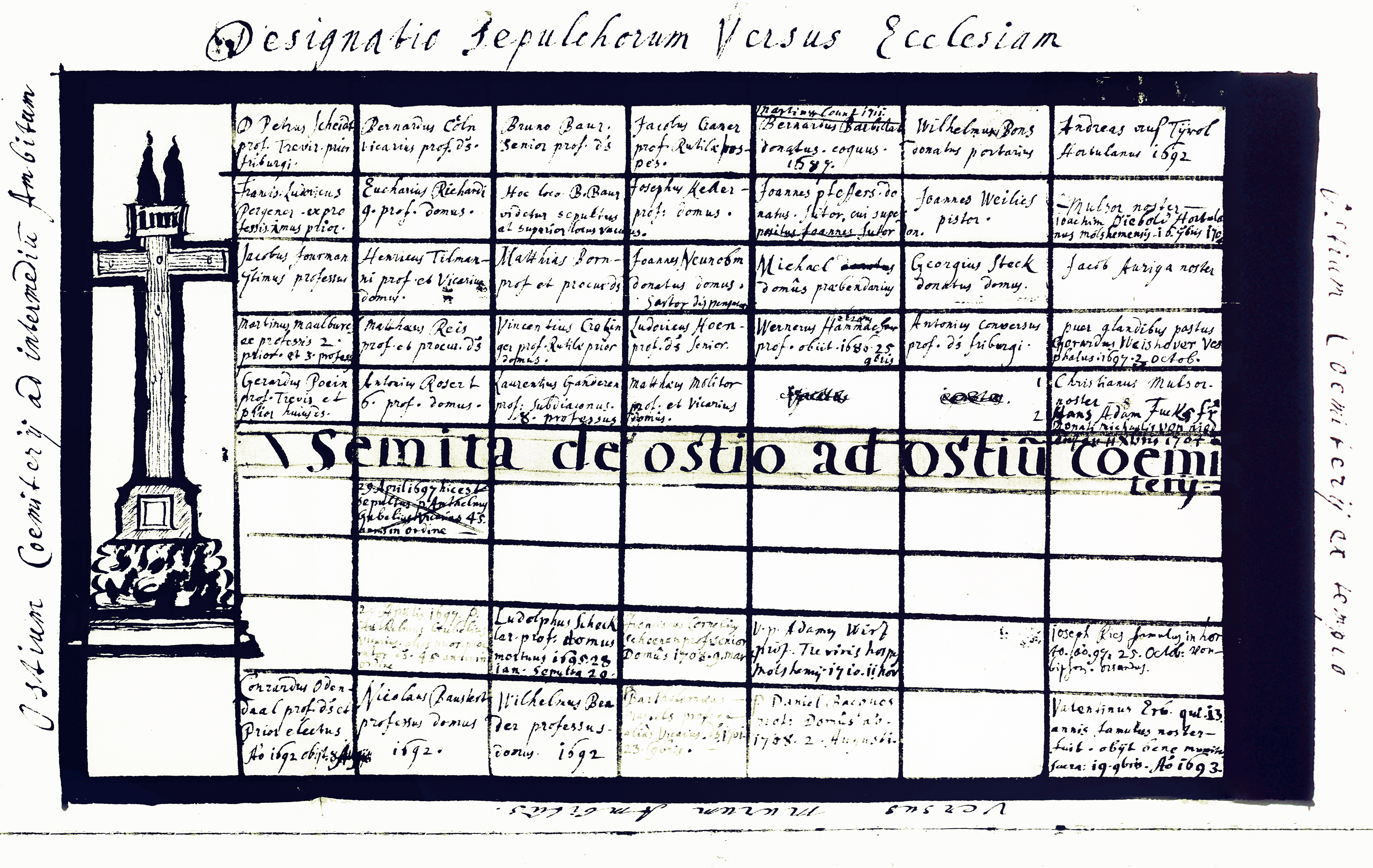
Plan of the Carthusian cemetery in Molsheim, showing the occupied graves and the places still available.

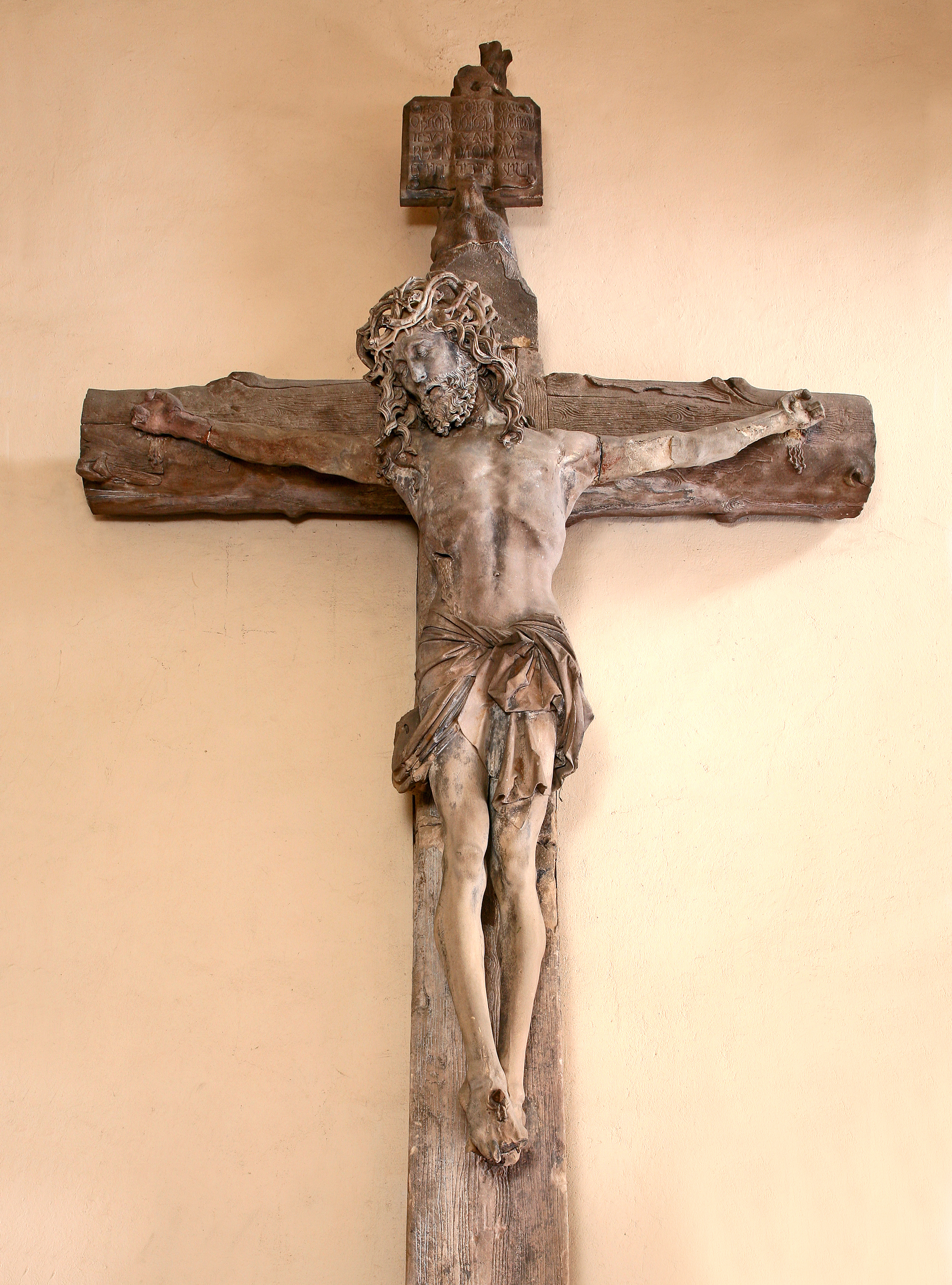
General view of the large cross in the Carthusian cemetery, from the monastery in Koenigshoffen

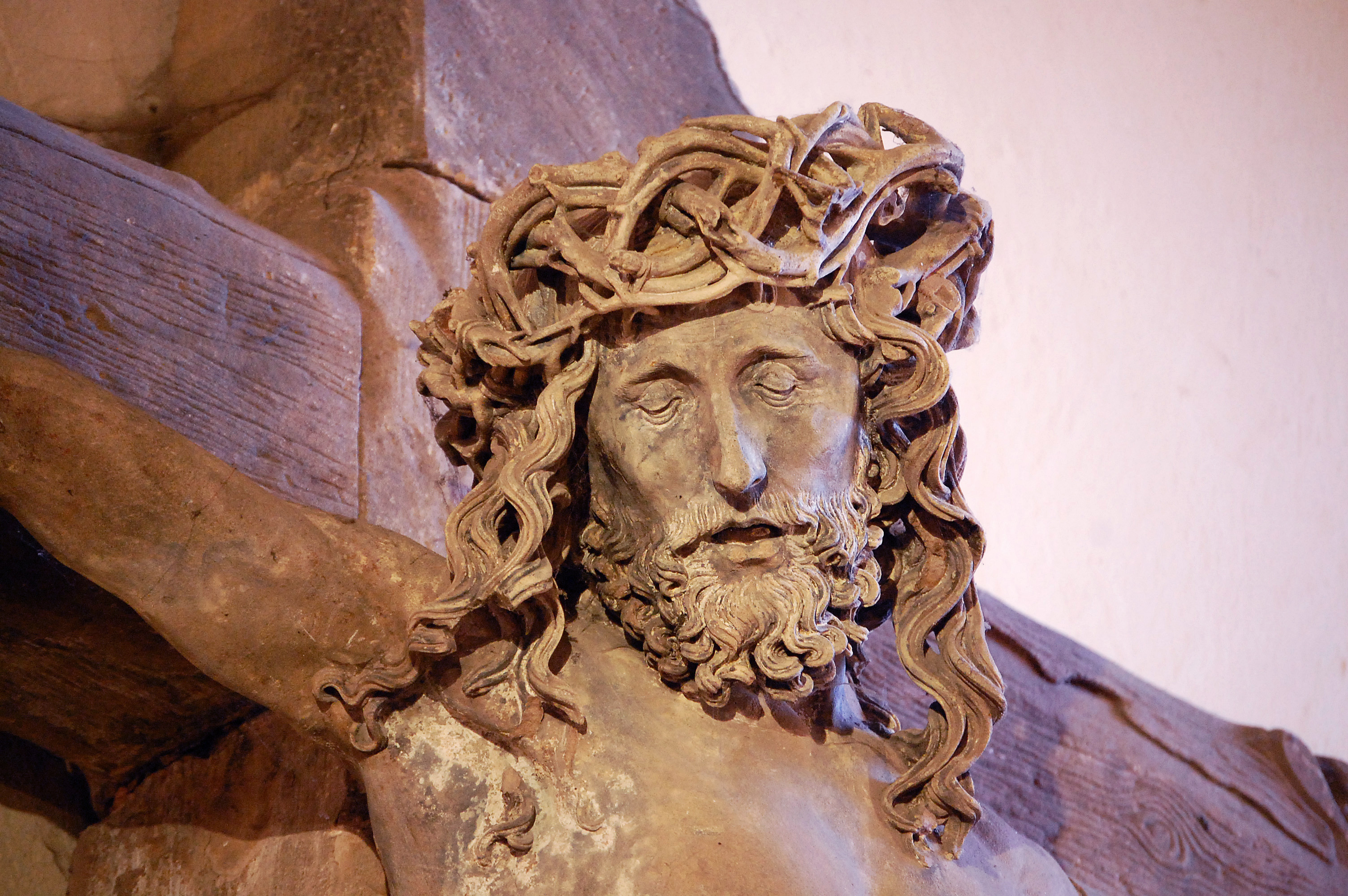
Detail of the large cemetery cross, now placed in the Jesuit church.

The courtyard also housed the monks' graveyard, which extended from the northern corner. Carthusian tombs are reduced to their simplest expression, i.e. a simple wooden cross bearing no name whatsoever; the deceased monk has no coffin, but is simply wrapped in his habit, with his hands crossed over his chest. The tombs are placed in no particular order on either side of the central aisle. The priors of the second half of the 17th century are all grouped together in the first three rows from the large cross; the next rows contain the tombs of fathers and donors; the last rows, on the western side, were those of brothers and servants. The cross that adorned the graveyard on the eastern side was erected on September 26, 1626; it came from Koenigshoffen. For a long time it was thought to be the work of a lay brother, but the hypothesis now generally accepted is that of a talented Strasbourg sculptor. The cross, carved from a block of pink Vosges sandstone weighing almost twenty tonnes, four and a half metres high and two and a half metres wide, is dated to around 1480, according to Walter Hotz, who likens it to the Baden-Baden crucifix carved by Nicolas Gerhaert of Leiden. The upper arm of the cross bears the inscription INRI in Latin, Greek and Hebrew in a classical manner.

==== The fathers' cloister ====
The cloister itself was built from 1614, and completed before 1626; the northern wing is the oldest. Unlike an abbey cloister, although it also forms an elongated rectangle, the north and south wings extend beyond the east and west galleries to serve all the fathers' cells. This arrangement is not common to Carthusian monasteries, but is specific to Molsheim. Thus, the north wing of the cloister was thirty-four bays long, i.e. one hundred and nine metres; the south wing, which was shorter on the western side and was limited by the prior's dwelling, was only twenty-nine bays long, i.e. a little over 90 metres. The shorter east and west wings were only ten bays long, or about thirty-two metres. Finally, the two galleries leading to the fathers' choir were three bays long. The shape of the consoles supporting the ribs, as well as the more complex ornamentation of the keystones, which are more accomplished in the southern gallery, show that the latter is later than the northern gallery. In the southern gallery, especially near the cemetery cross, the motifs on the brackets show scenes from the Passion. Further west, the motifs are vegetal, leaves or fruit; throughout the southern gallery, the keystones, as opposed to the flat rings of the northern gallery, feature floral or star motifs, or rosettes.

The floor of the galleries is covered with quadrangular Vosges sandstone slabs. On the courtyard side, the cloister walls are pierced with twinned bays and access doors to the cemetery, all of which are enclosed in low arches. On the other hand, along the extensions of the gallery beyond the courtyard, lighting is only provided by oculi in the upper part of the walls. The twinned bays contained 115 or 116 very famous stained glass windows. The stained glass windows are the work of Lorentz and Barthélemy Linck; without further clarification, it is not possible to define whether the latter is the first of the name, father of Laurent, or the second, brother of the latter, although modern historiography tends to favour this second hypothesis. Moreover, the cloister was a very colourful space, with yellow ochre plaster covering the walls, highlighting the window frames with a lighter yellow, the window arches in grey, the brackets in red, their pattern in yellow, and the vault ribs in blue.

The cloister of the monastery

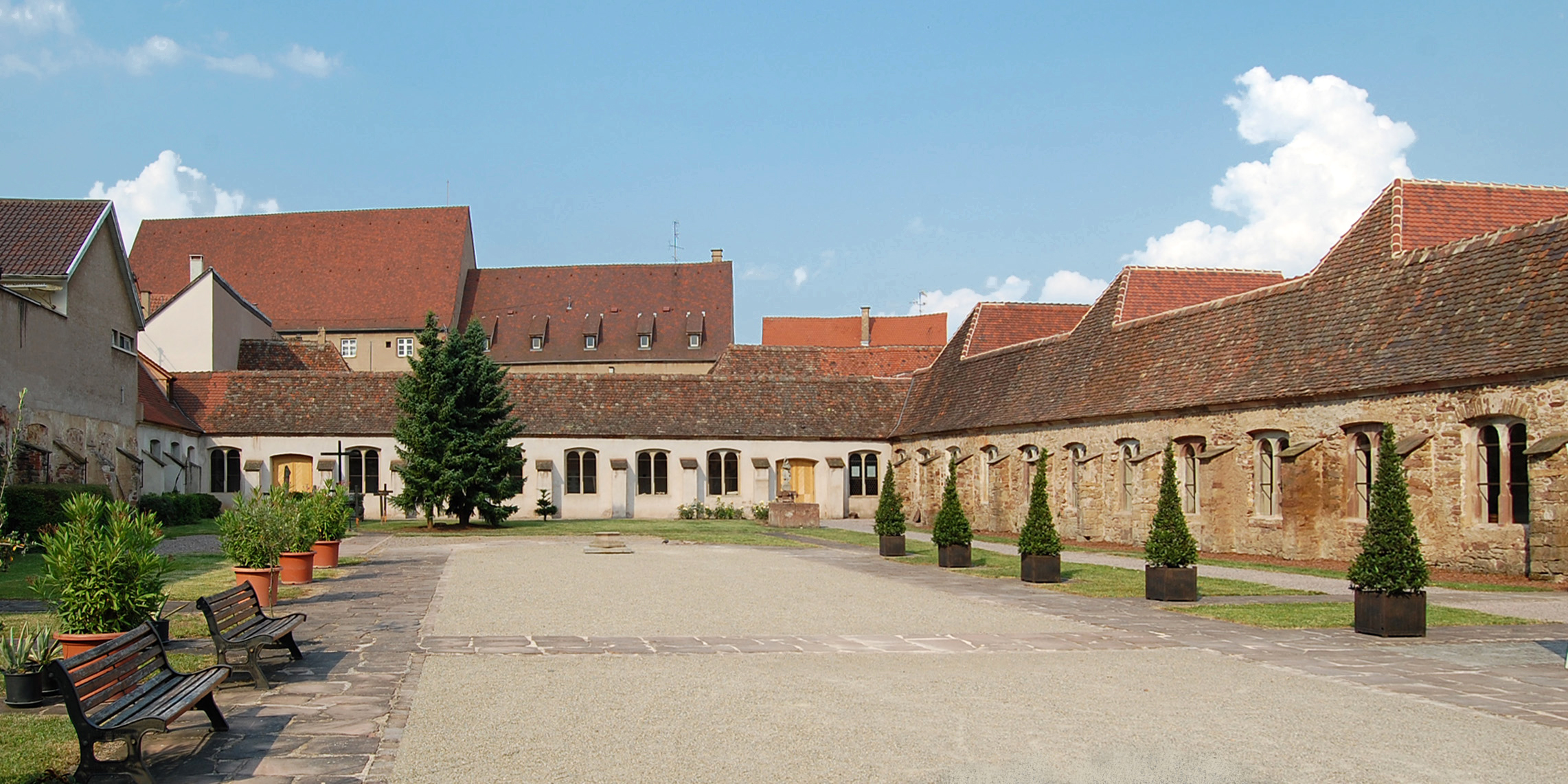
The cloister of the charterhouse in 2010.

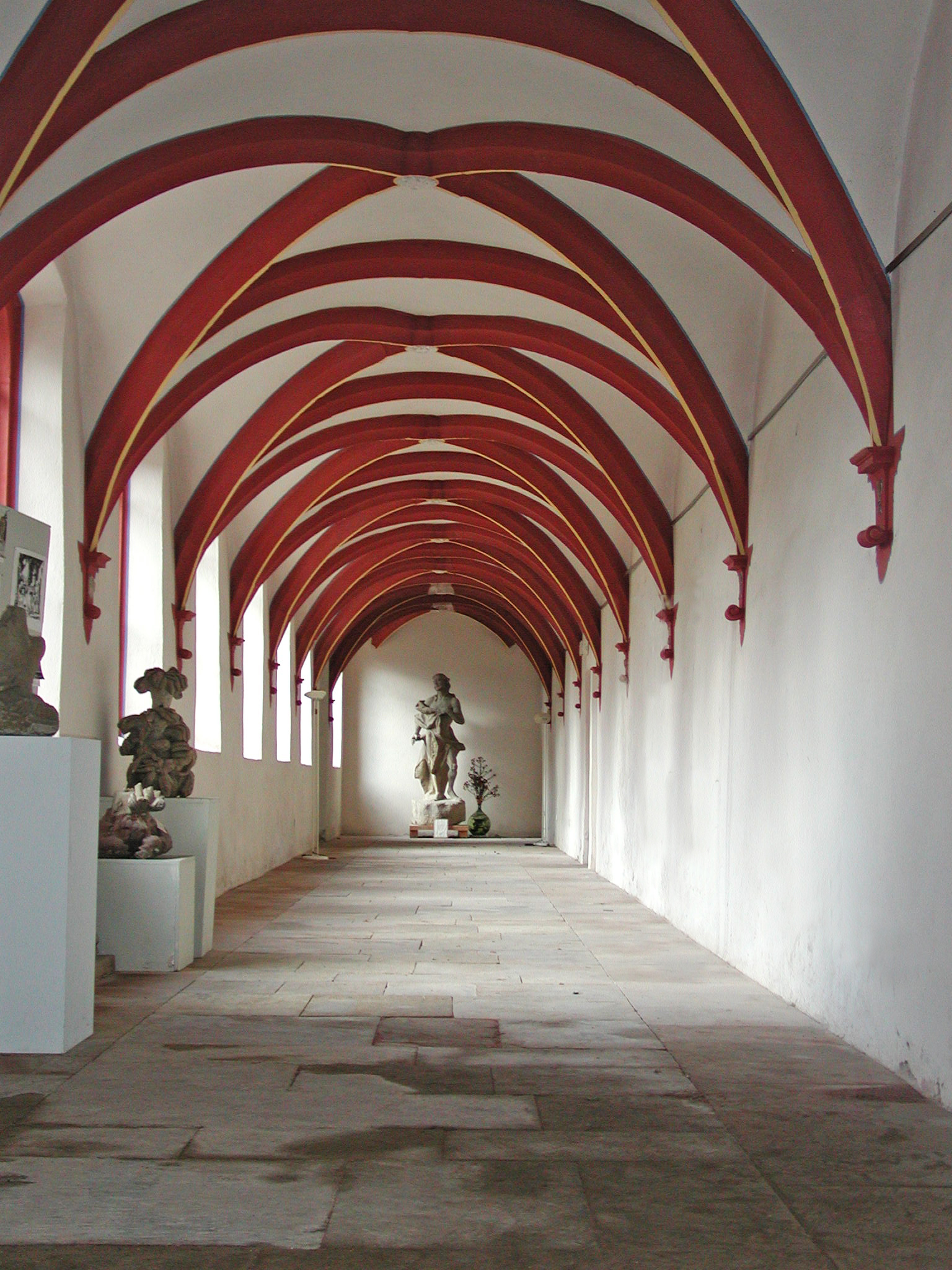
The eastern gallery of the cloister.

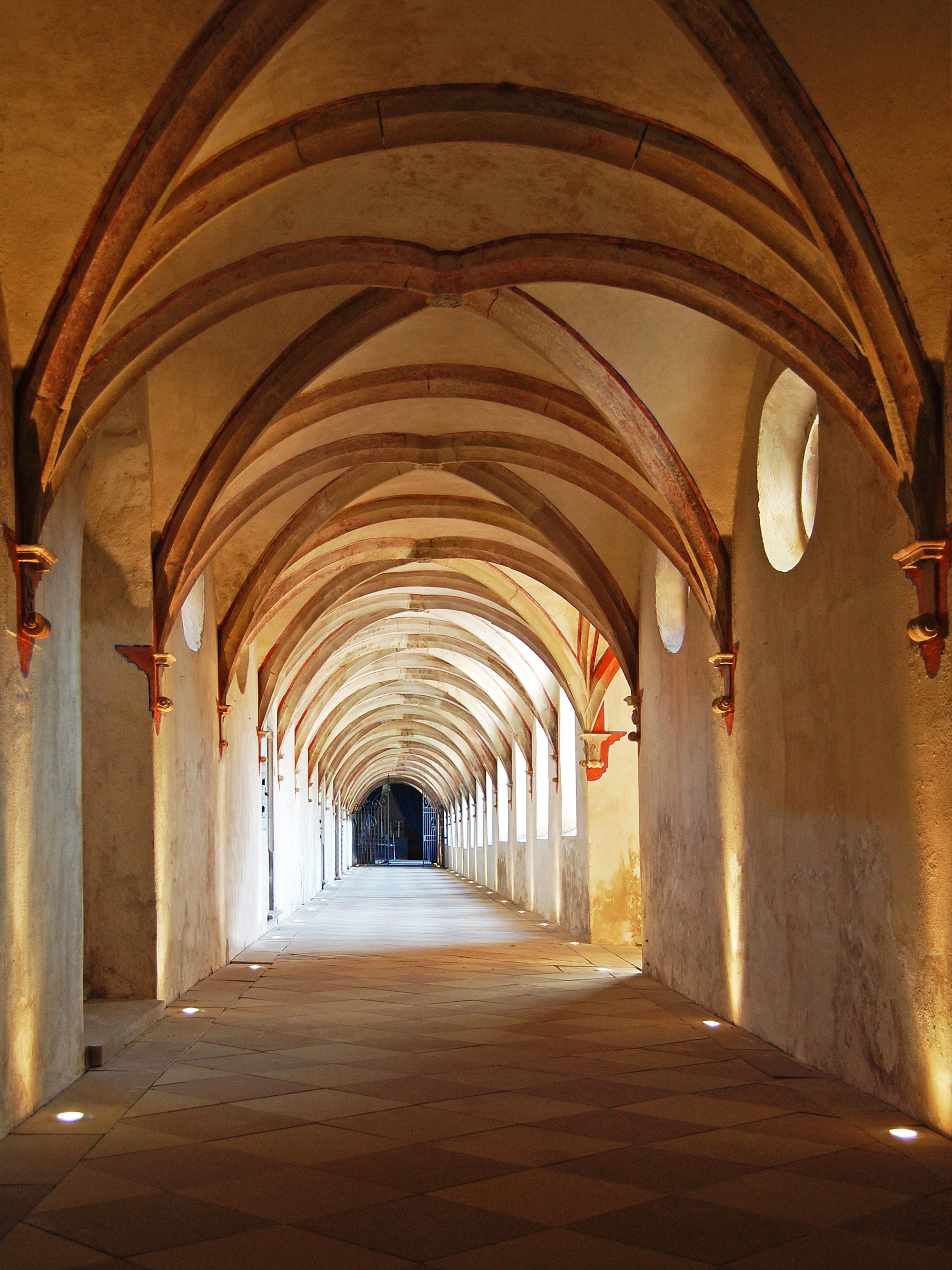
The southern gallery of the cloister seen from the east, with its two styles of openings.

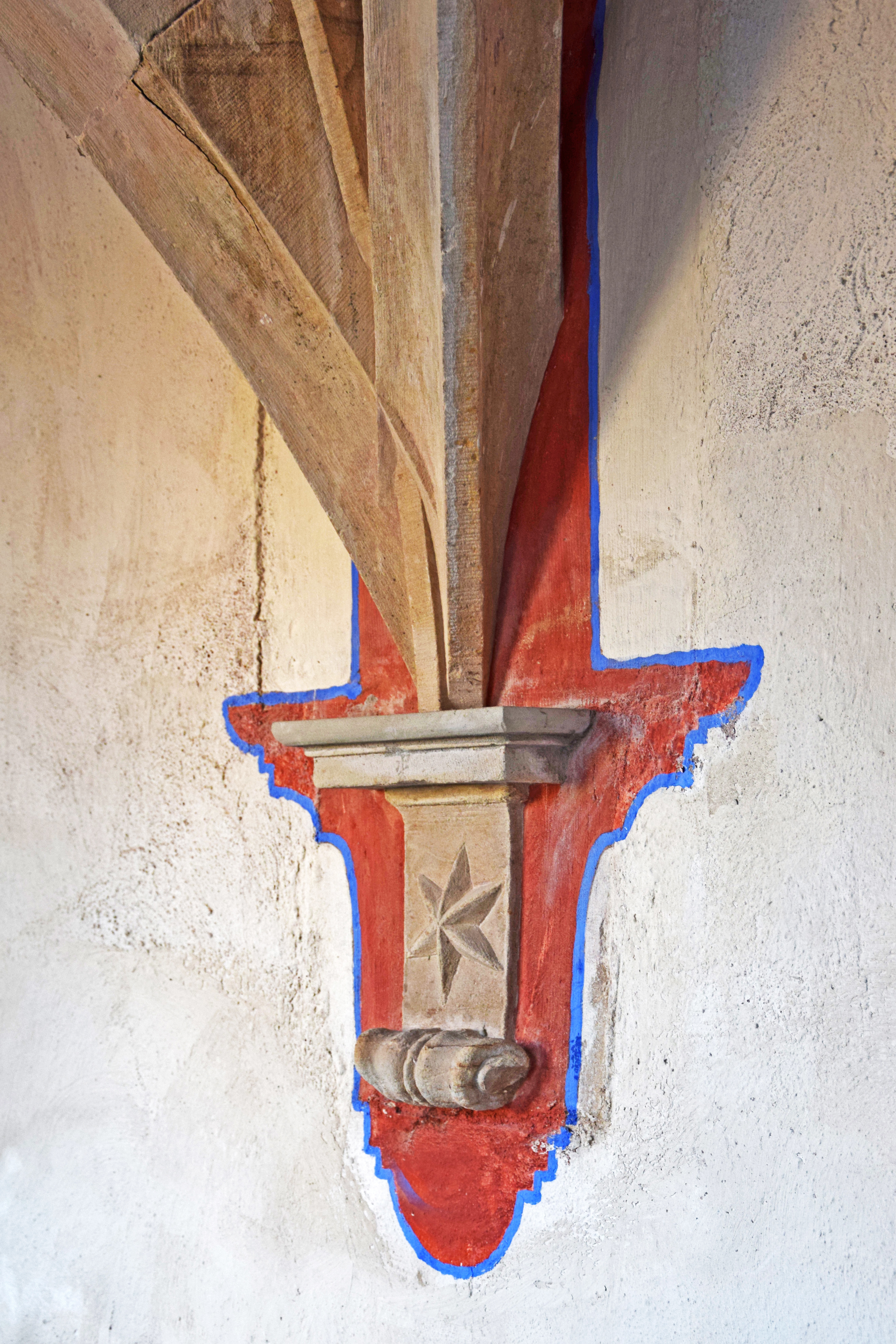
Example of a console visible in the southern cloister.

==== The stained glass windows of the cloister ====
The stained glass windows were by far the most important decorative element of the cloister, which is corroborated by several accounts. Jean-Gaspard Bernegger mentions them as early as 1675, fearing the damage that the Dutch war and its spillover into Alsace could do to these works. In 1696, Antoine Ruinart raved about the stained glass windows "painted with such delicacy and finish that nothing more perfect in this genre could be imagined". Jean André Silbermann, a young organ builder, visiting Molsheim while his father André was installing the organ in the Altorf Abbey church, "could not get enough of admiring the beautiful windows painted in the Carthusian monastery". The Benedictine monk Philippe-André Grandidier admired "the beautiful and fresh glass paintings with which the cloister is decorated all around the cells". Finally, in 1771, Johann Wolfgang von Goethe, who only mentioned this one monument on his trip to Alsace, briefly recalled that "in the cloister of the abbey [sic] of Molsheim, we admired the stained glass windows painted in colour".

The revolutionaries, despite their desire to destroy it, were not indifferent to the quality of the stained glass. Joseph Klein suggested placing an advertisement in The London Gazette, stating that "English connoisseurs" had estimated the entire collection at one hundred thousand pounds. In 1790, when the looting had already begun, 95 of the 114 stained glass windows counted by Silbermann were still in the cloister; the windows were then dismantled and transported to Strasbourg. On February 15, 1796, the curator of art monuments for the Bas-Rhin, Léopold Keil, counted 89 panels. A new transfer to the city's library, then located in the former Dominican church (now the Temple Neuf), took place in 1800, but only 83 stained glass windows were recorded. In 1842, the historian Charles Schmidt mentions these windows in his Notice sur la ville de Strasbourg, and attributes them to Lorentz Linck, as well as to "Léonard" (and not Barthélémy). For him, the main pictorial inspiration for the glass masters was to be found in Maarten de Vos. During the 1859 archaeological congress, the 77 surviving stained glass windows were exhibited in fourteen displays by Pierre Rielle de Schauenbourg. Ferdinand Charles Léon de Lasteyrie reproduced two panels in 1853, in his work Note sur les vitraux d'Alsace. In retrospect, he states that "the most admirable collection of stained glass windows of this kind that I have ever seen was that of the former abbey of Molsheim [...] It was an incomparable collection [...] The stained glass windows of Molsheim bore the characteristics of Swiss art to the highest degree".

On the night of August 24-25, 1870, during the siege of Strasbourg, the municipal library of Strasbourg burned down. All the stained glass windows in the library were destroyed; only seven were saved in their original state, one other, the Crucifixion, having been restored, and two others being known from watercolour engravings by Lasteyrie.

==== The monastic cells ====
Molsheim Charterhouse was of an intermediate size, with nineteen cells, which is more than a "simple" Carthusian monastery (twelve cells) but less than the Grande Chartreuse (thirty-five cells) or Aula Dei, near Saragossa (thirty-six). The cells were numbered by the first nineteen letters of the alphabet, from A to T, in a clockwise rotation, starting from the west. The first eight cells, numbered A to H, were built by the master builder Ulrich Tretsch; the first seven were financed by donations from Leopold V of Austria-Tyrol, the eighth by Tretsch himself. The construction dates of the other cells are unknown, with the exception of the O and P cells, which were built in 1670.

As in all the Carthusian monasteries, cells A and B are traditionally reserved for the prior and the vicar; in addition, in Molsheim, cell E was that of the sub-sacristan. The cells are marked on the map and are indicated in black capital letters above each cell door. In 2017, the letters D, E, F, M, P and T visible above the doors are the original ones. Some cells, such as E, have just a lettering. Others, M and P for example, show two successive states of lettering. The doorposts to the cells are sometimes decorated with plant motifs, as in the case of doors D and E. The two doors of cells E and G have also retained their old cold-hammered fittings. Each door is also juxtaposed with a pass-through, known as a "guichet", which allows the Carthusian father to receive his food without human contact. The doorposts to the cells are sometimes decorated with plant patterns, as in the case of doors D and E. The two doors of cells E and G have also retained their old cold-hammered fittings. Each door is also juxtaposed with a pass-through, known as a " counter ", which allows the Carthusian father to receive his food without human contact.

Each cell consisted of a single-storey house. This small house, leaning against the wall separating it from the neighbouring cell, was covered with a hipped roof perpendicular to the church, with the exception of cell A which was on the east-west axis. The houses at the eastern end of the cloister were grouped in pairs under the same roof: H with L, I with K, M with P and N with O. Each little house had a small garden which the monk cultivated; along it was built a promenoir, a gallery running alongside the garden, which allowed the Carthusian father to walk around, particularly during the Alsatian winter, and also to access the latrines, simple pits whose emptying was the responsibility of the executioner of Molsheim. A cell, excluding the walkway, measured about eight by nine metres, which, given the thickness of the walls, gave a usable interior surface area of about 56 square metres.

Two cell plans coexisted at Molsheim: the first can be found in cell E (see below), but also D, F or G. The main feature of this plan is the presence of a corridor about one metre wide separating the living areas from the cloister. This corridor ends at one end with the door to the small garden and at the other with the staircase to the cell's attic. The other, simplified plan is, for example, reproduced in cells K, L, M, P or Q (below, cell L): the long corridor serving as an airlock is absent, and the cell's entrance door leads directly into the large room, as does the staircase to the attic. In most Carthusian monasteries, the monk's life is divided into two parts: manual work downstairs in the garden and prayer, study and living upstairs. In Molsheim, this arrangement was not implemented and manual work was located in the workshop.

Whatever the plan, once past the possible airlock, the cell is divided into three rooms. The largest, on the wall, is lit by a single window. Known as the "workshop" or "laboratory", it was used by the father for his manual work: painting, woodturning, for some of the activities identified in Molsheim. The other two rooms are located on the garden side. The one closest to the cloister is the father's bedroom or cubiculum, which also served as his oratory for the recitation of services. It consists of a bed, a wardrobe and a stall with a prie-Dieu. The last small room, on the opposite side of the garden from the cloister, is the studium. Heated by a stove (initially an earthenware stove, then a cast-iron stove at the end of the 18th century), it was the study room, where manuscripts were copied and bound. For this purpose, it contained a table and some library shelves. A shelf in the window embrasure allowed the monk to take his meals.

Finally, the small garden, of about the same size as the cottage, was mainly cultivated with medicinal plants and flowers. Trees and espaliers, visible in the 1744 representation, softened the mineral aspect of the place.

The cells of the Carthusian monks of Molsheim

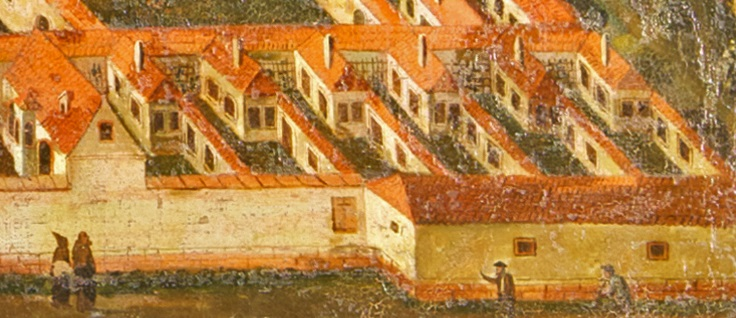
Extract from the painting of 1744: the cells of the southern part (from T to O, going from the left to the right).

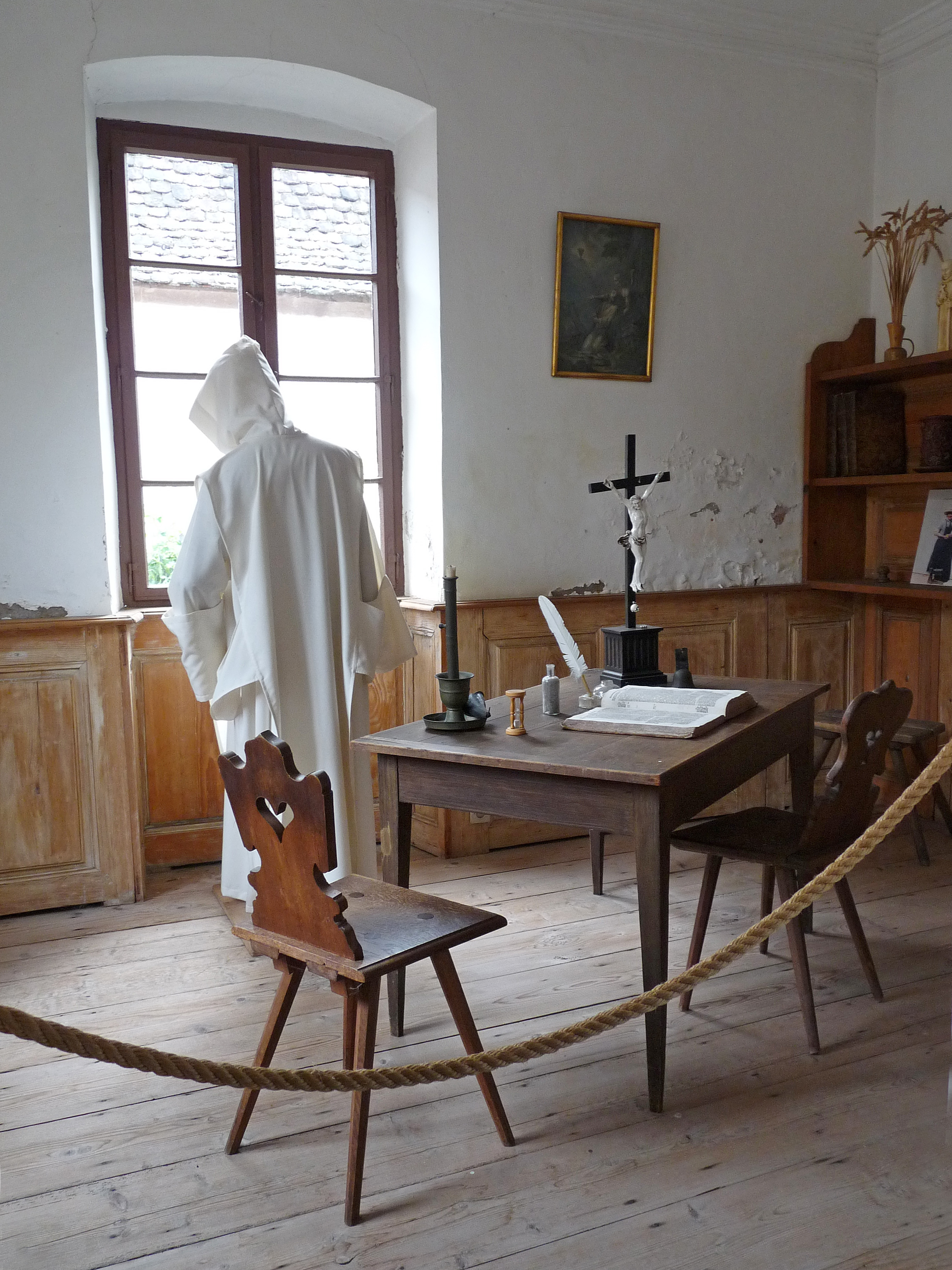
Interior of cell L of Molsheim Charterhouse.

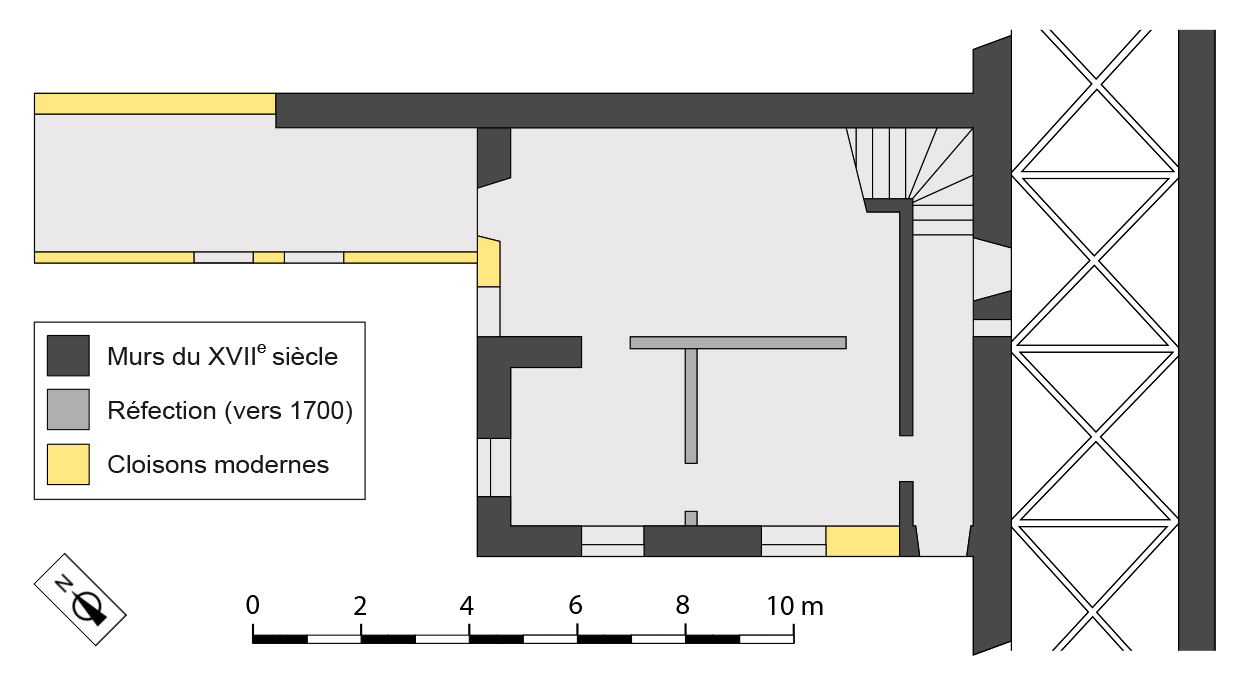
One of the two standard cell plans at Molsheim Charterhouse (cell E).

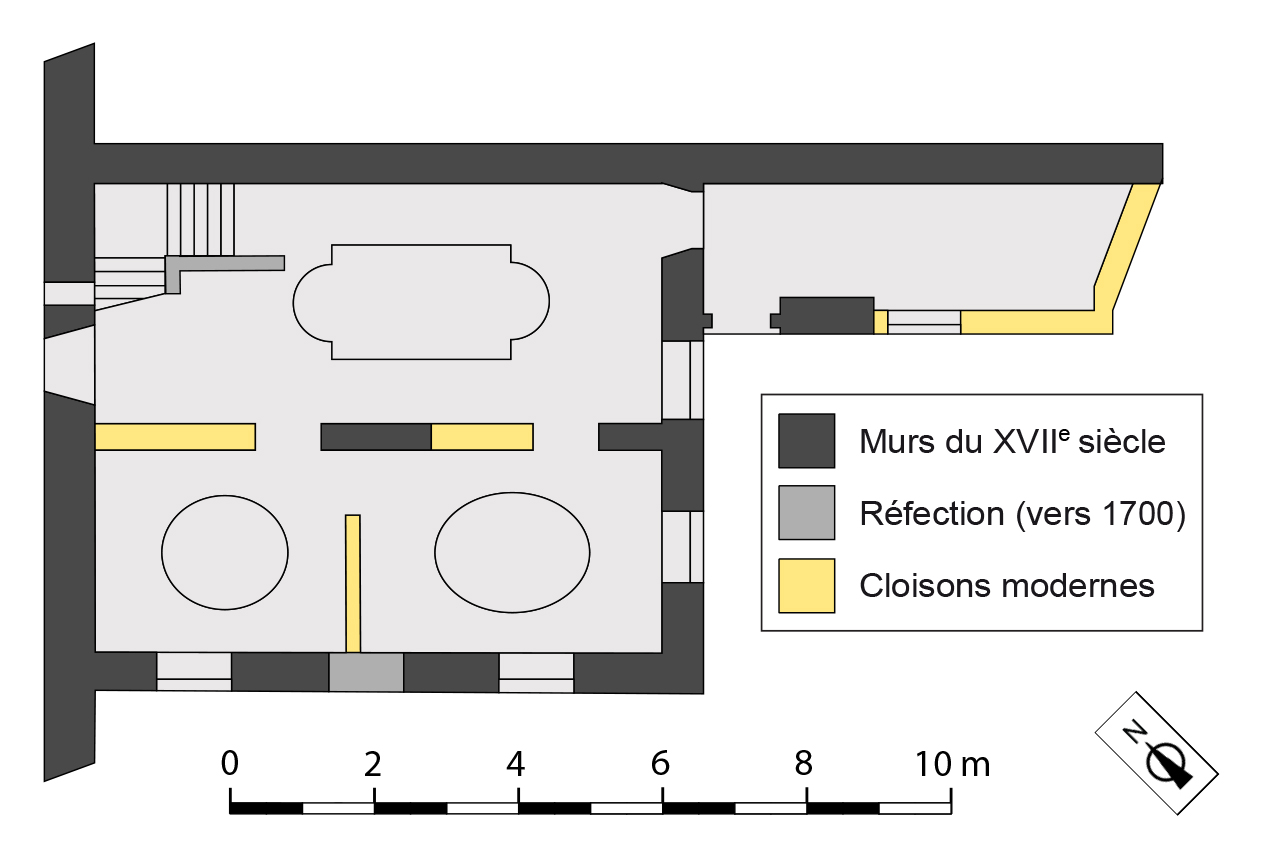
One of the two standard cell plans at Molsheim Charterhouse (cell L).

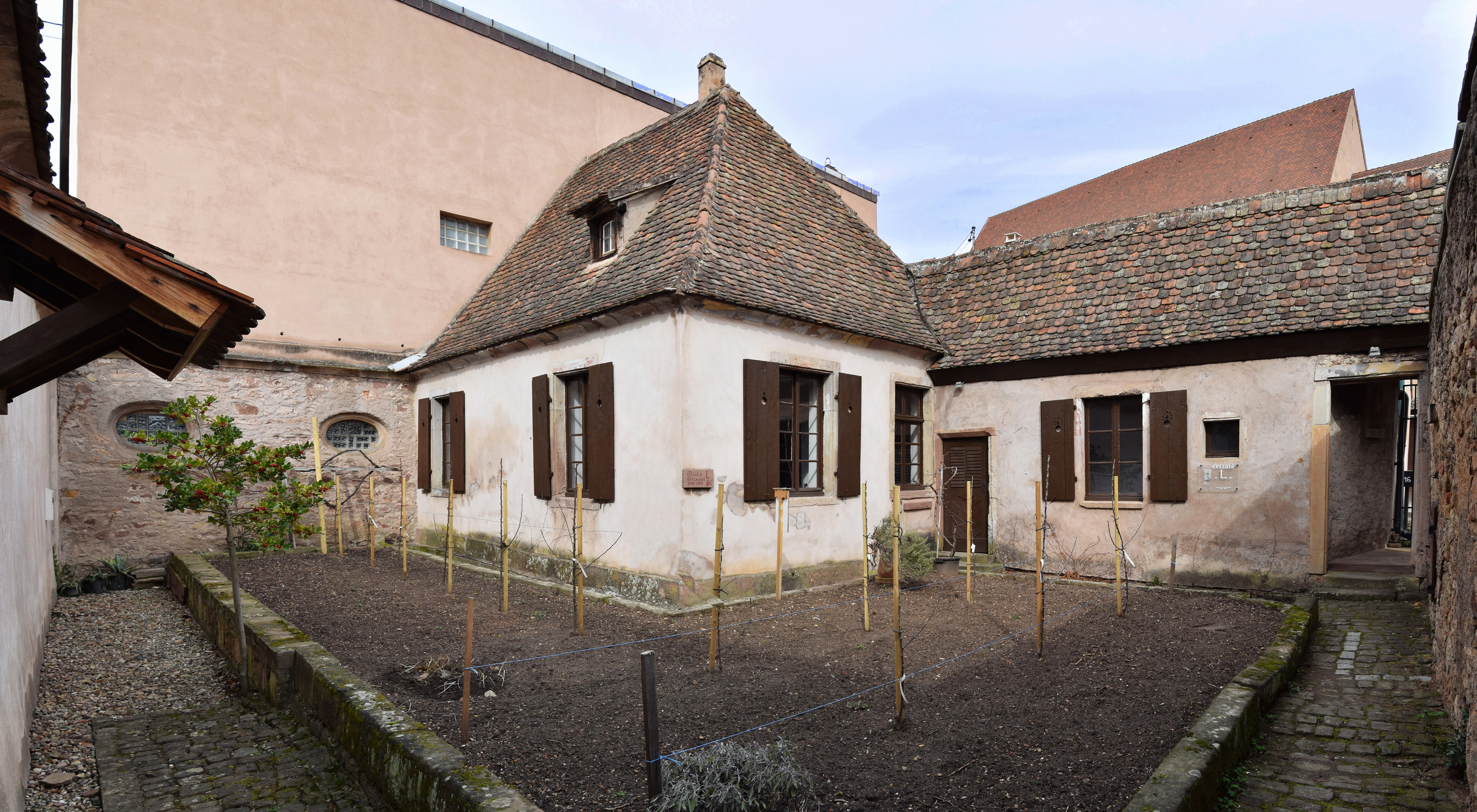
Cell L in 2017, after rehabilitation.

==== The prior's house ====
The prior's house, later known as the "Carthusian Priory", is a long building which was the southern end of the western front of the church. The main part, which was wider, overlooked the courtyard of honour, which later became the "Carthusian courtyard". To the south, the building was extended by a narrower and probably more recent part, probably after 1744. The more qualitative treatment of the first part of the building was particularly evident in the façade, decorated with a pediment representing Mary of Magdala, at the entrance to a cave and with her hand resting on a skull. She is in fact considered by Christian historiography, and in particular by Carthusian historiography, as the first of the hermits, and as such enjoys great consideration in the order.

The priory was vaulted by Odendal, who feared the risk of fire. The ground floor is arranged around a vestibule, on both sides of which the chapel and the "stove" were located. This vestibule leads to the cloister to the east, which is integrated into the building. In monastic times, the first floor of the prior's house was accessed by a spiral staircase between the church and the house. On the first floor, the prior's flat consists of four large rooms in a row overlooking the main courtyard and two rooms overlooking the courtyard. The second part of the building consists of a large vaulted cellar on the ground floor, topped on the first floor by three large rooms in a row with panelling and inlay. The largest of these has a stuccoed ceiling in the Rococo style. The furnishings in this part date from the mid-18th century.

The kitchen wing actually comprised the kitchens on the ground floor and the brothers' rooms on the upper floor. A Renaissance spiral staircase provides access to the upper floor. This earlier construction is also revealed by two fireplaces, which are attested to in 1673. In 1690, Prior Conrad Odendal had the water supply system in this building improved so that the friar cook had running water to preserve the fish.

==== Hospitality ====
The construction of the guesthouse was planned to replace the "Böcklerhof", the destruction of which began on October 21, 1698. The provincial visitors and the General of the Order approved the project. The meeting between Prior Philippe Zell and the Italian architect Giovan Betto, who was working on Bosserville Charterhouse, was decisive, but the monks initially preferred a project that allowed the reuse of the old foundations, whereas Betto proposed a building further away, whose setback would enhance the façade of the church. The extra cost of this project was compensated for by the lower height.

The vaults of the cellar of the reception building were built in 1700; the atrium and the cloister of the brothers, as well as each of the rooms of the new guesthouse, were blessed on August 31, 1701. On the same day, a Te Deum was sung in the church in thanksgiving, and the first stone of the monumental staircase of the reception building, the work of Jean Rockuz, was laid. The façade of the new guesthouse was also decorated with a large sundial, which is still in place in the 21st century.

The L-shaped building comprises a nine-bay first-floor guesthouse on the north side, crossed on the ground floor by a carriageway, closed at both ends by double doors. Two side doors lead into this passage and provide access to the vaulted cellars on either side. The eastern cellar had two naves of six bays each, the western cellar four bays. Inside, on the eastern side, a three-flight staircase dated 1699, with a wrought iron handrail decorated with foliage, connected the cellars to the upper floor. Upstairs, a long central corridor served the twelve rooms on either side. The rooms are decorated in the 18th-century style, in particular with ceilings decorated with mouldings.

The wing on the west side of the main courtyard, although part of the same complex as the northern guesthouse, had a very different function and was known as the reception building (recette): it included the house of the procureur (the monastery's steward or man of business). Contrary to what the regular façade with its fifteen bays of windows suggests, the interior layout was rather irregular, which most probably reflects the re-use of older walls or foundations. As in the guesthouse, a wide passageway divides the wing in two. On one side of this passageway were located a bakery, two kitchens, a bedroom and two heated rooms; on the other a cooperage, a bedroom, an antechamber and a cellar. The first floor, accessed by Jean Rockuz' monumental staircase, was divided into eleven rooms, served by a narrow central corridor. The attic was divided by two fireproof sandstone walls, the gables of which rose in tiers.

==== The monastery gardens ====
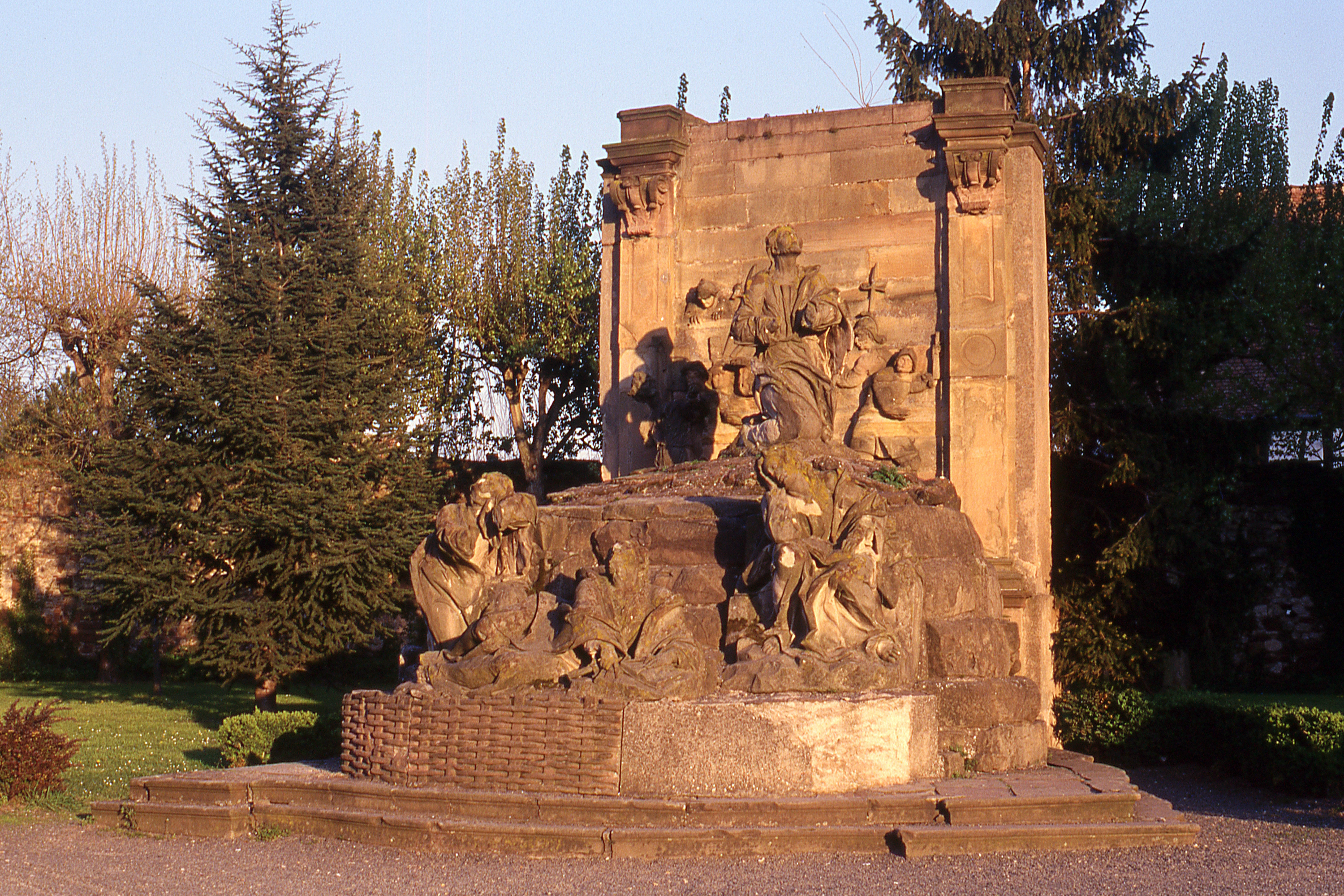
The Mount of Olives in Molsheim, formerly located in the eastern gardens of the charterhouse and now near the Jesuit church.

The monastery has two green areas at either end. The first is located to the west. It was acquired piecemeal from 1599 onwards, mainly through the purchase of properties in the "Berggasse", an alley running parallel to the western city walls. In 1653, when the monks had bought all the properties in the street, the municipality sold the street itself to the monks. During the 17th century, the garden was a place of pleasure. But before 1714, it was gradually transformed and acquired a mainly food-producing function. It included a vegetable garden, a fishpond, and a stone greenhouse with exotic trees set against the rampart.

The second garden, situated to the north of the fathers' cells, i.e. to the east of the monastery, was more particularly devoted to prayer and was decorated with a large Mount of Olives. This monument, similar to a Calvary but representing another episode of the Passion of Christ, was much used for moments of silent prayer. The proximity of the urban area, and in particular the eastern gate of the charterhouse, just north of the tithe barn (Dîme de Molsheim), meant that the monks were often disturbed in their devotions by the cries of children. The Mount of Olives itself was dismantled and moved to the Jesuit church in the early 19th century.

=== After the monks ===
The main change in the spatial layout concerns the destruction of the buildings. In particular, the monastic church was levelled down to its foundations. The latter, uncovered by the 1983 excavations, were restored to the space of the former courtyard. Since 1985, the Molsheim Historical Museum, previously located in the Metzig, has moved to the charterhouse, more precisely to the "priory", i.e. the residence of the prior between 1684 and 1792. In 1986, the Bugatti Foundation set up a memorial hall in the former kitchen wing, dedicated to the Bugatti family and the Bugatti automobile brand. Since 1991, the same wing has housed the city's media library, even further west.

The Society for the History and Archaeology of Molsheim and Surroundings, founded in 1952, has its headquarters in the charterhouse where it regularly organises conferences and exhibitions.

The use of the site during the 20th and 21st centuries

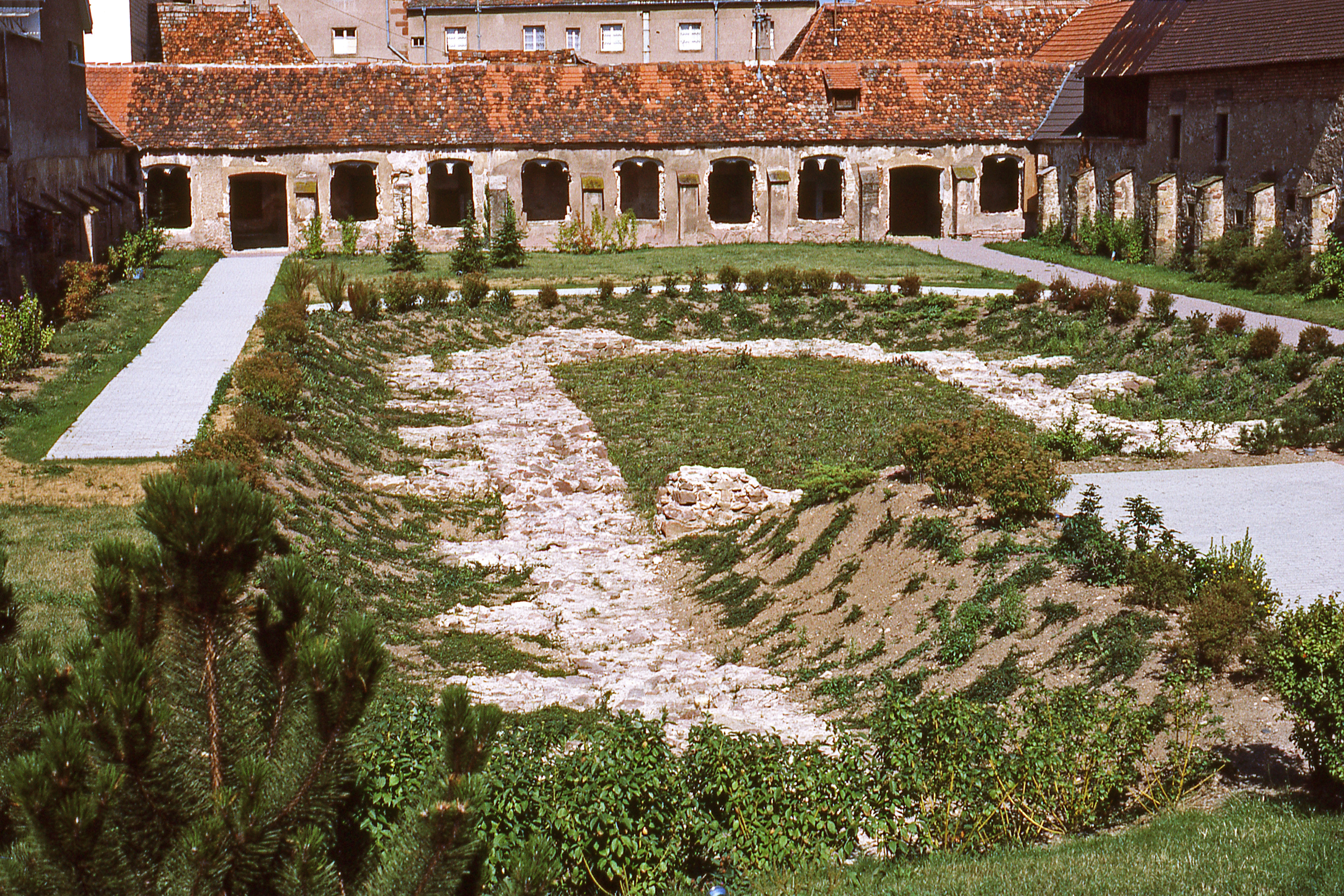
The cloister in 1985, showing the foundations of the conventual church.

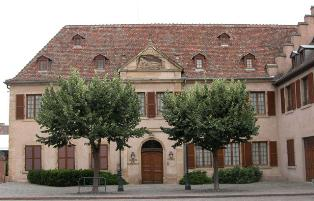
The prior's house, now the Musée de la Chartreuse.

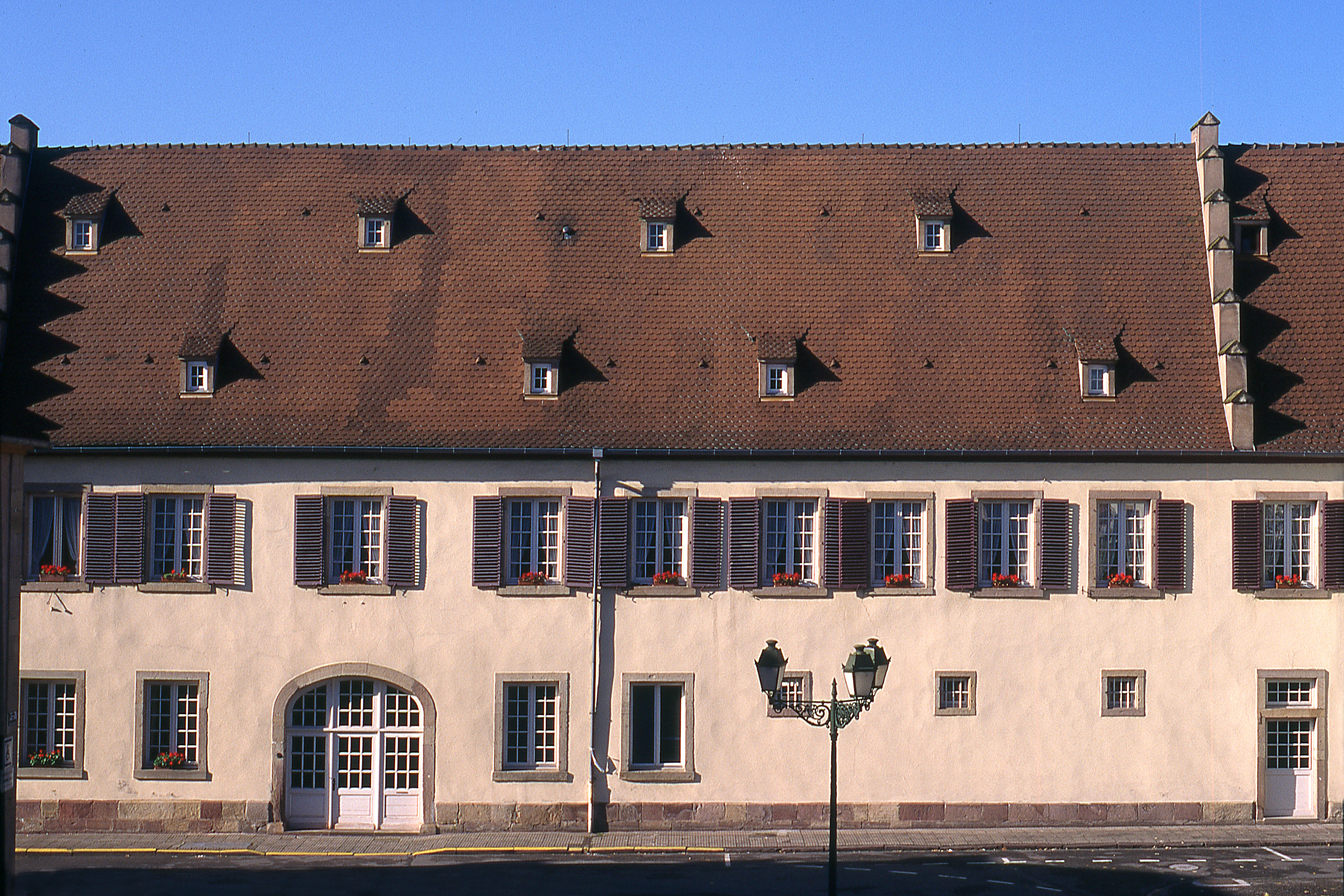
The former reception wing, converted into a hospital.

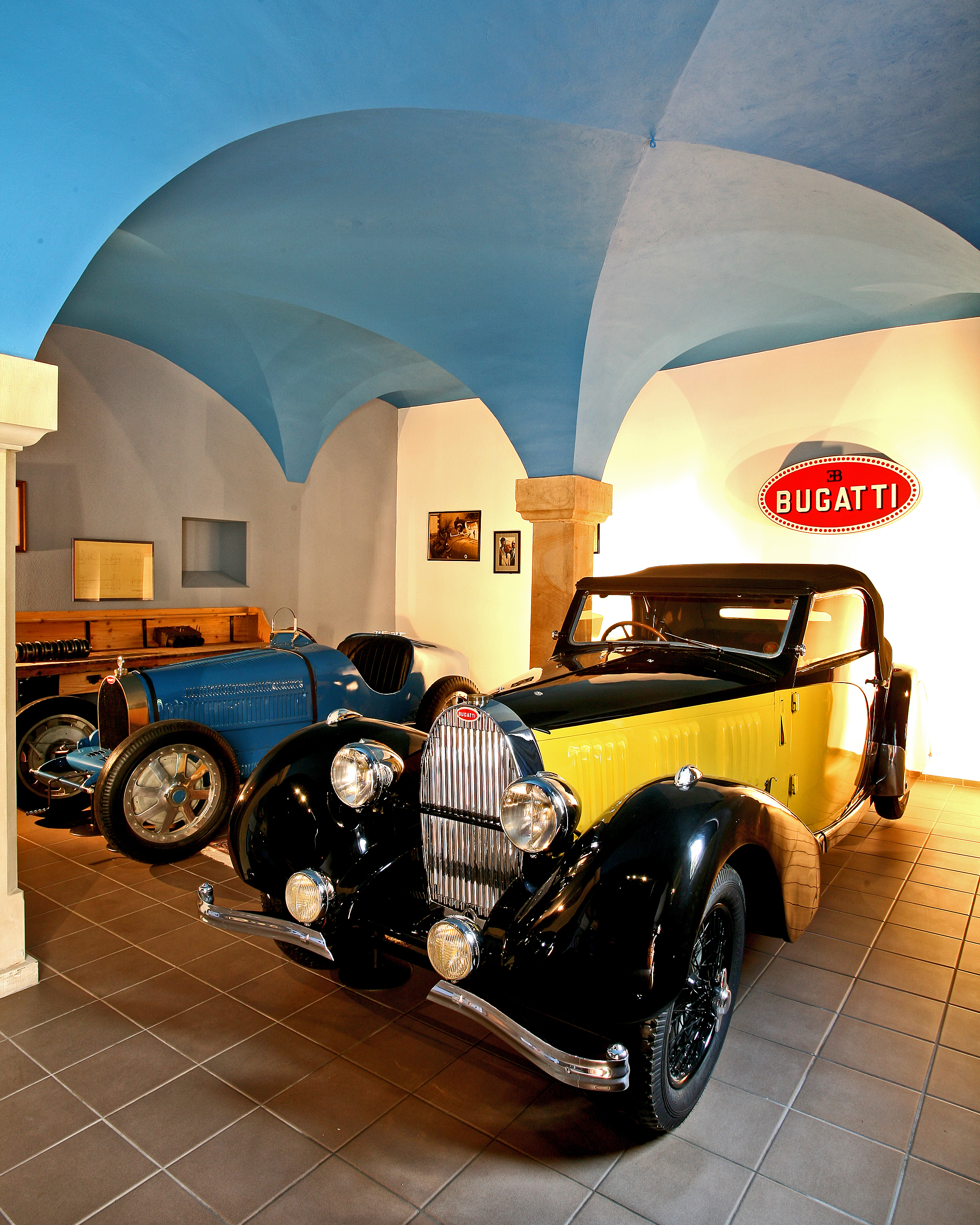
The Bugatti Foundation in the former kitchen wing.

Similarly, since 2006, the Arts et Cloître association has been offering workshops and lectures. Finally, since 1987, the association Les Vendredis de la Chartreuse has offered concerts and shows.

All the "secular" buildings of the monastery are owned by the local hospital, which has converted them for its own needs. The general plan and the external aspect have been respected. On the other hand, heavy work undertaken in 1987 concreted the staircase of the guest wing up to the roofs, notwithstanding the protection of the Historic Monuments, which eliminated the wrought iron banister. The eastern cellar was converted into a chapel. The original partitioning of the rooms disappeared at that time, as did most of the decoration. The reception building was extended to the north by a small building, dating from the 18th century, which abutted the city walls.

To the west of the reception building was still the farm. The monastery records of 1702 list eight horses, seventeen cows, four oxen, six pigs and 90 poultry. The representation of 1744 confirms the agricultural purpose of the western part. At the other end of the monastery, completely to the east, the Carthusian monastery had a "back cellar" located in the extension of the Dîme, and comprising three levels, plus the two attic levels, above vaulted cellars of three aisles of three bays.

== See also ==
- List of Carthusian monasteries

=== Bibliography ===
- Lefebvre, F.A. (1883). Saint Bruno et l'Ordre des chartreux (PDF) (in French). Paris: Librairie catholique internationale. p. 359. Lefebvre.
- Joseph Gass (1921). La chartreuse de Molsheim : ses trésors artistiques et littéraires (in French). Strasbourg: F.-X. Le Roux. p. 38. Joseph Gass 1921.
- Pierre Bachoffner (July 2, 1982). "Le vin médicinal des Chartreux de Molsheim (1702) : Vincent Klee et Christian De Backer, Le vinum medicatum (1702) du chartreux Antoine Basel, sa formule conservée dans les Annales de la Chartreuse alsacienne de Molsheim récemment retrouvées à la chartreuse de Pleterje (Yougoslavie)". Revue d'Histoire de la Pharmacie (in French). 70 (252). Société d'Histoire de la Pharmacie: 63–65. Pierre Bachoffner 1982.
- Louis Schlaefli (1984). "La chartreuse de Molsheim, quelques dates". Annuaire de la Société d'histoire et d'archéologie de Molsheim et environs (in French). Molsheim: Société d'histoire et d'archéologie de Molsheim et environs. pp. 57–64. Louis Schlaefli 1984.
- James Hogg (1987). "The lost chronicles of the Charterhouse of Molsheim". Analecta Cartusiana (76). Institut für Anglistik und Amerikanistik: 196–200. OCLC 18061988. James Hogg 1987.
- Jean-Philippe, Meyer; Auguste, Schmitt (1988). "Les bâtiments de la chartreuse de Molsheim : XVIIè et XVIIIè siècles". Bulletin Monumental (in French). 148 (1). Molsheim: Société d'histoire et d'archéologie de Molsheim et environs: 101. Meyer & Schmitt 1988.
- Jean, Martin (1995). "Les formules des boules d'acier vulnéraires" (PDF). Revue d'Histoire de la Pharmacie. 83 (305). Société d'Histoire de la Pharmacie: 196–200. doi:10.3406/pharm.1995.4244. Jean Martin 1995.
- Raymond, Keller (2011). "Nouvelles du "chantier des bénévoles" de la Chartreuse de Molsheim". Annuaire de la Société d'histoire et d'archéologie de Molsheim et environs (in French). Molsheim: Société d'histoire et d'archéologie de Molsheim et environs. p. 122. Raymond Keller 2011.
- Louis, Schlaefli (2011). "Trésors disparus de la bibliothèque de la chartreuse de Molsheim". Annuaire de la Société d'histoire et d'archéologie de Molsheim et environs (in French). Molsheim: Société d'histoire et d'archéologie de Molsheim et environs. pp. 13–18. Louis Schlaefli 2011-1.
- Louis, Schlaefli (2011). "Du neuf relatif au cycle des vitraux de la Chartreuse de Molsheim". Annuaire de la Société d'histoire et d'archéologie de Molsheim et environs (in French). Molsheim: Société d'histoire et d'archéologie de Molsheim et environs. pp. 33–34. Louis Schlaefli 2011-1.
- Raymond, Keller; Robert, Blosser (2015). La chartreuse de Molsheim : une résurrection après plus de 28 années de restauration (in French). Molsheim: Association des bénévoles du chantier de la Chartreuse de Molsheim. p. 176. ISBN 978-2-915954-34-0. OCLC 930362095. Keller & Blosser 2015.
- Grégory, Oswald; Robert, Blosser (2017). La chartreuse de Molsheim : 1598-1792 (in French). Molsheim: Société d’histoire et d’archéologie de Molsheim et environs. p. 136. ISBN 9782915954333. OCLC 1010268162. Grégory Oswald 2017.
- Louis, Schlaefli (2018). "L'économie de la chartreuse de Molsheim d'après les comptes de 1755-1788". Annuaire (in French) (305). Société d'Histoire et d'Archéologie de la Région de Molsheim et Environs: 47–64. doi:10.3406/pharm.1995.4244. ISSN 0986-1610. Louis Schlaefli 2018.
