= Roland Bugatti =

French engineer and automotive industrialist

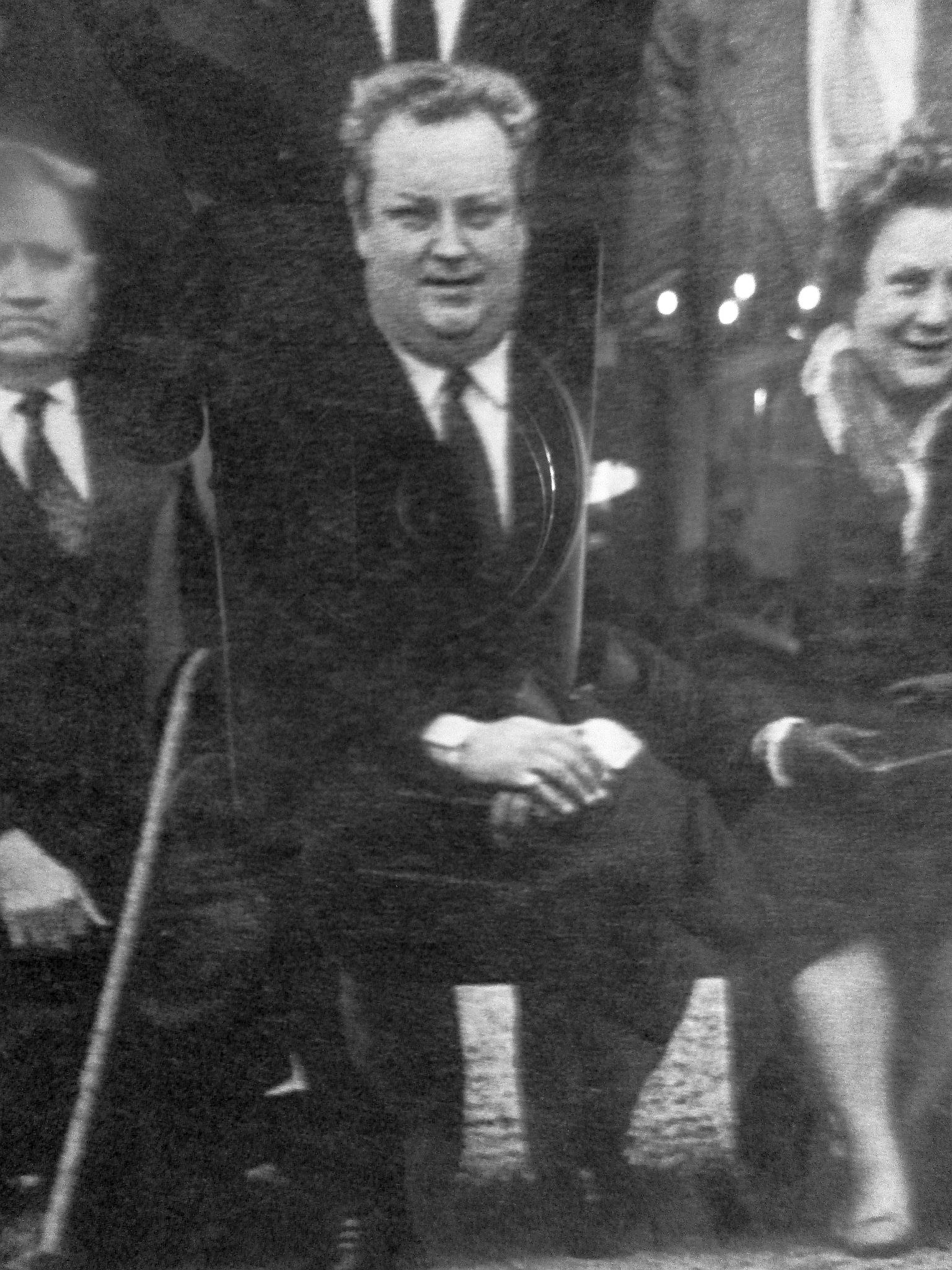
- Born: 23 August 1922; Dorlisheim, France
- Died: 29 March 1977 (aged 54); Aix-en-Provence, France
- Occupation: engineer

Roland Bugatti (23 August 1922 – 29 March 1977) was a French engineer and automotive industrialist. He was one of the three sons of Ettore Bugatti, founder and builder of the car brand Bugatti, and younger brother of Jean Bugatti.

== Biography ==
In 1951, after the death of his brother Jean Bugatti in 1939, and his father Ettore Bugatti in 1947, Roland Bugatti (age 25) and Marco Pierre (former pilot and loyal partner of the plant) tried to pursue the Adventure Bugatti unsuccessfully.

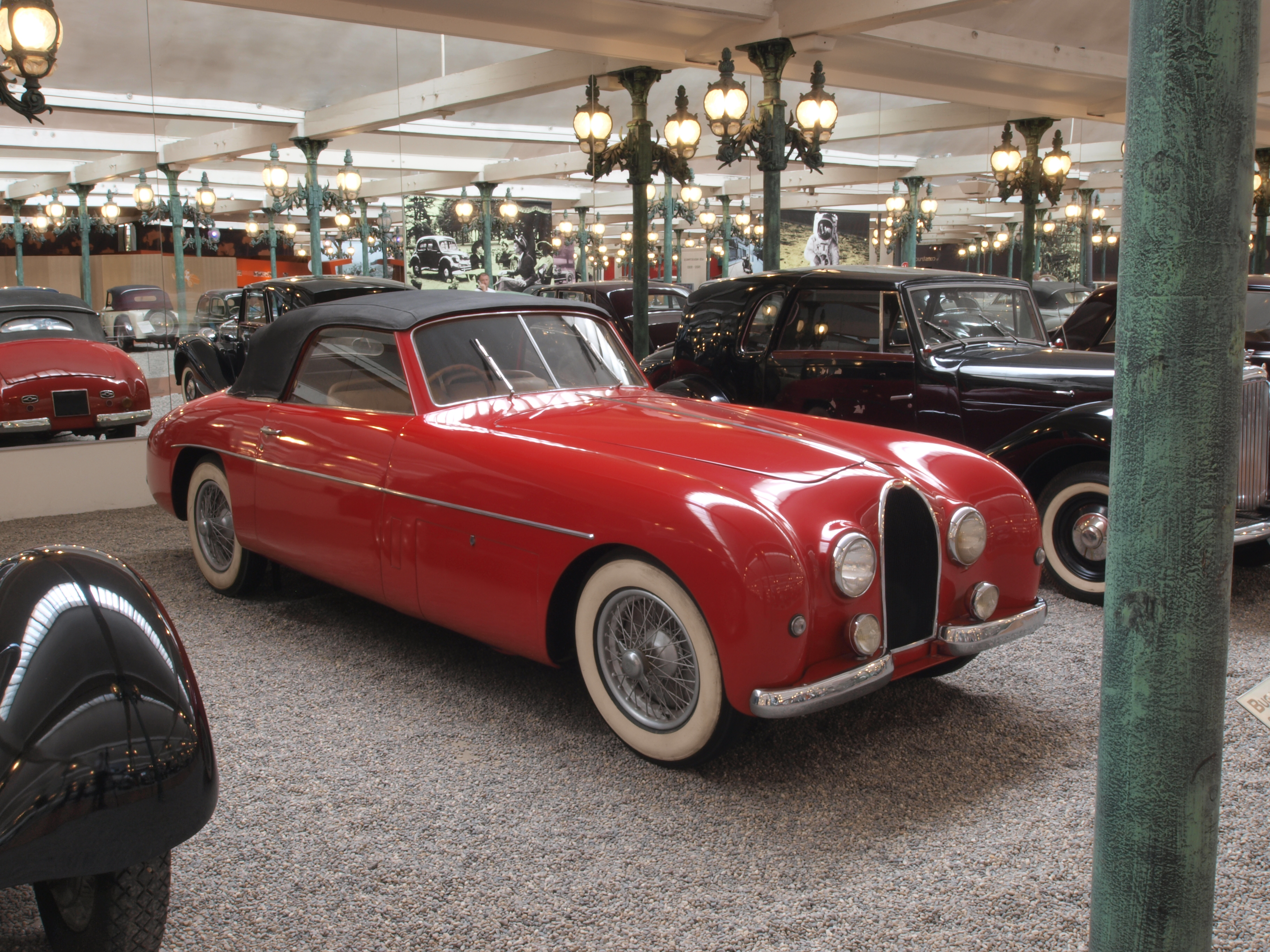
1951 Bugatti Type 101

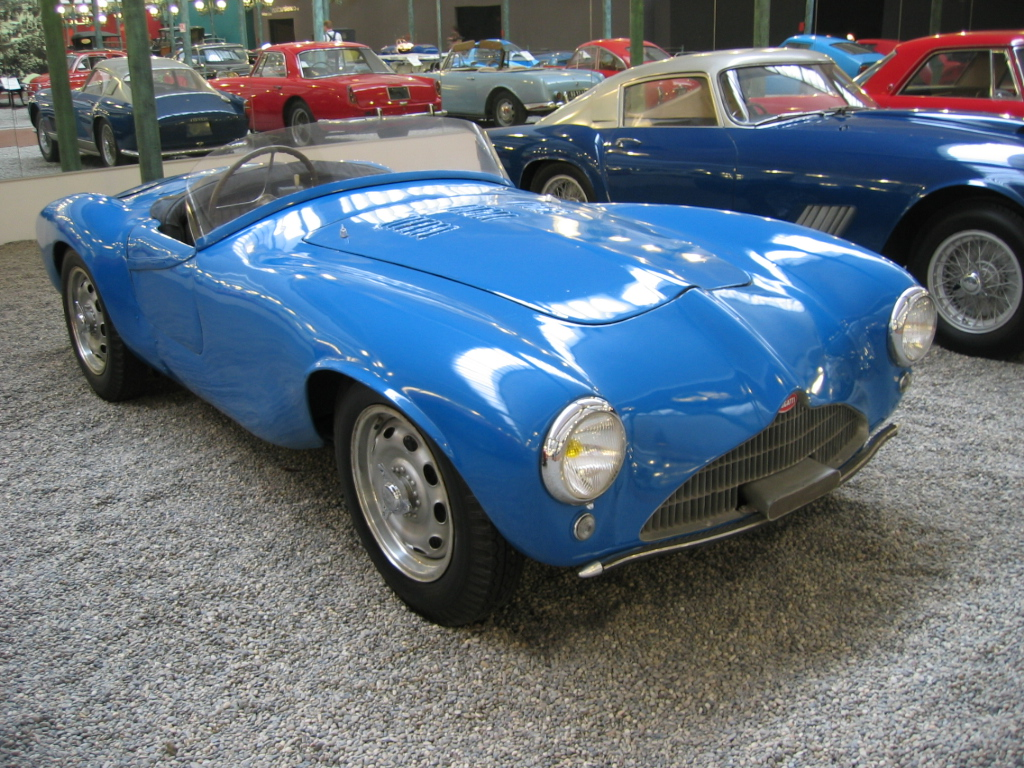
1956 Bugatti Type 252

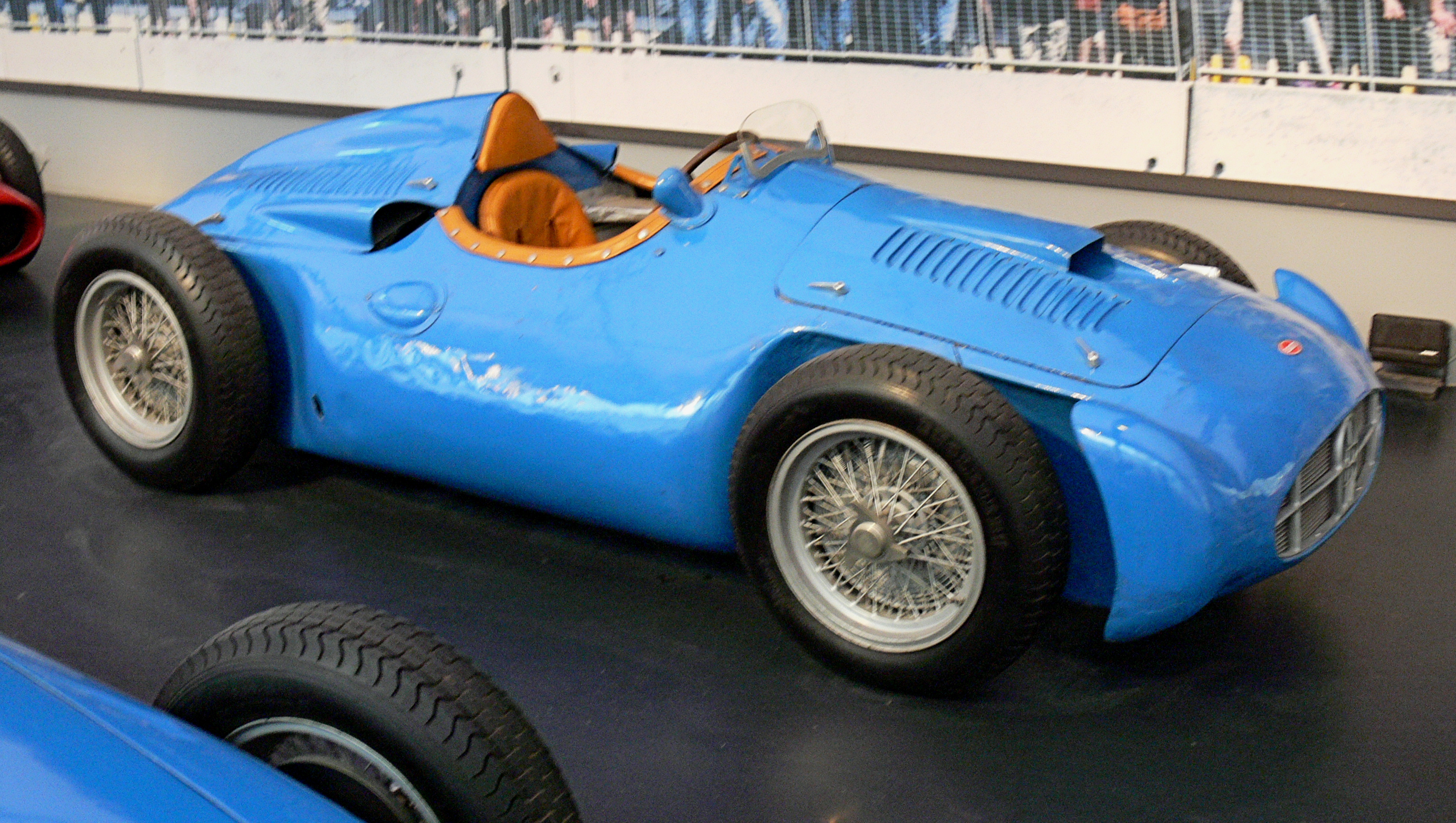
1956 Bugatti Type 251

They produced the Bugatti Type 101, successor of the Bugatti Type 57; It is considered by many to be the last true Bugatti car. Eight models were produced in 1951 and 1952 (and one in 1965) and six of them were sold.

In 1956 the company attempted a comeback in Formula One competition with the Bugatti Type 251.

In 1963 Bugatti was sold to the aerospace company Hispano-Suiza.

Bugatti died in Aix-en-Provence on 29 March 1977.
