= Ettore Bugatti =

Italian-born French automobile designer and manufacturer (1881–1947)

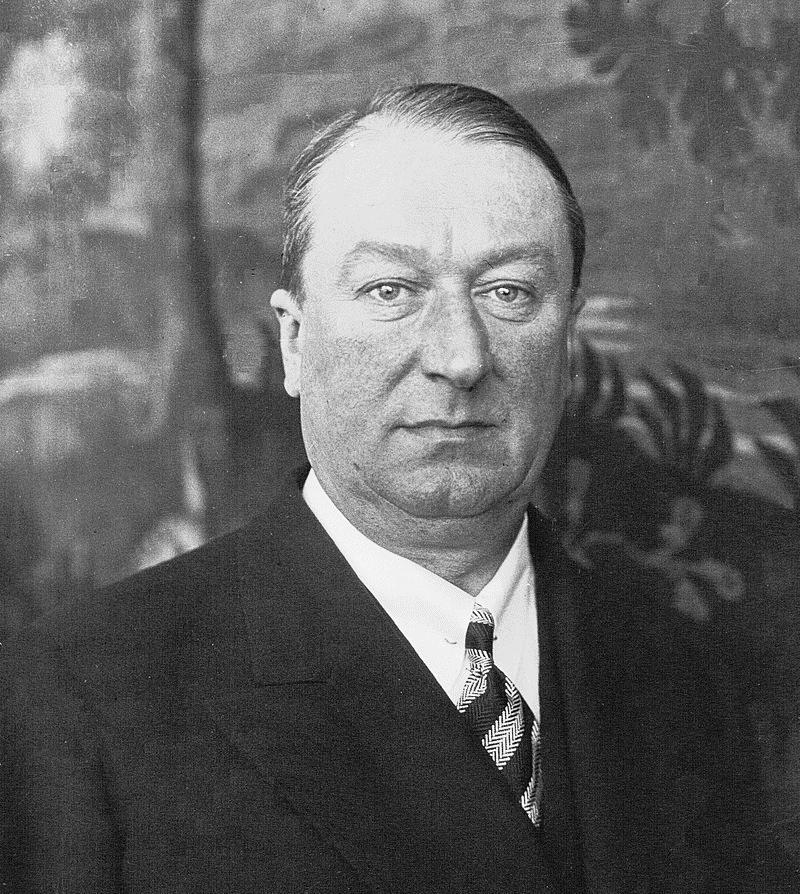
- Bugatti in 1932
- Born: Ettore Arco Isidoro Bugatti; 15 September 1881; Milan, Kingdom of Italy
- Died: 21 August 1947 (aged 65); Paris, France
- Resting place: Dorlisheim, Francex
- Citizenship: Italian, French
- Occupation: Automotive engineer
- Years active: 1898–1947
- Employer: Automobiles E. Bugatti (founder)
- Father: Carlo Bugatti
- Relatives: Rembrandt Bugatti (brother); Jean Bugatti (eldest son); Giovanni Luigi Bugatti (paternal grandfather); Giovanni Segantini (uncle)

Ettore Arco Isidoro Bugatti (Italian: [buˈɡatti]; French: [bygati]; 15 September 1881 – 21 August 1947) was an Italian-French automobile designer and manufacturer. He received French citizenship in 1946 and is remembered as the founder and proprietor of the automobile manufacturing company Automobiles E. Bugatti, which he founded in 1909 in the then German town of Molsheim in the Alsace region of what is now France. Bugatti died in Paris and is buried in Dorlisheim, France.

== Family origin and early life ==
Bugatti was born into an artistic family in Milan, Italy. He was the elder son of Carlo Bugatti (1856–1940), an important Italian Art Nouveau furniture and jewellery designer, and his wife, Teresa Lorioli (1862–1935). His younger brother, Rembrandt (1884–1916), was a renowned animal sculptor. His aunt, Luigia Bugatti, was the wife of the painter Giovanni Segantini. His paternal grandfather, Giovanni Luigi Bugatti, was an architect and sculptor.

Bugatti's father intended that he follow a conventional technical apprenticeship with one of the Milanese tri-/quadricycle manufacturers, but the boy quickly demonstrated a deep instinctive understanding of the wide range of aspects of motor-vehicle construction, and with Prinetti & Stucchi constructed his "Bugatti Type 1" in 1898.

== Early career ==
With financial support from Count Gulinelli, Bugatti developed a second prototype, the Type 2, which was a prize-winning exhibit at the Milan Trade Fair in the Spring of 1901. His design also caught the eye of Baron Adrien de Turckheim, who offered Bugatti the opportunity to come and design automobiles at his Lorraine-Dietrich car factory in Niederbronn. Frontier changes following the Franco-Prussian War had left De Dietrich with two car factories in two different countries: the Niederbronn plant, to which Bugatti now relocated was in Alsace, which had been part of Germany since 1871, reverting to French control only in 1919. In 1902 Ettore became the head of technology at De Dietrich.

From 1902 through 1904, De Dietrich built his Type 3/4 and Type 5/6/7, identified at the time with the name "De Dietrich, Licence Bugatti". While working for De Dietrich Bugatti met Émile Mathis. The two became first friends and then business partners, leaving De Dietrich in 1904 in order to produce automobiles of their own, which were identified with the name "Mathis-Hermes (Licence Bugatti)". This arrangement lasted till 1906 after which the partners went their separate ways, and Bugatti set up a "Research centre" at Illkirch-Graffenstaden, now a suburb on the south-side of Strasbourg. He produced several prototypes, collaborating closely with the Cologne based Deutz company.

In 1907, Bugatti was appointed Production Director ("Directeur des fabrications") with Deutz. Here he designed the Type 8/9. While employed at Deutz, Bugatti built the Type 10 in the basement of his home. In 1913, Bugatti designed a small car for Peugeot, the Type 19 Bébé.

== Automobiles E. Bugatti ==
Despite being born in Italy, Bugatti established his automobile company, Automobiles E. Bugatti, in 1909 in the then German town of Molsheim in the Alsace region of what is now France. The maker was known for some of the fastest, most luxurious, and technologically advanced road cars of its day. Exceptional engineering led to success in early Grand Prix motor racing, with a Bugatti being driven to victory in the first Monaco Grand Prix.

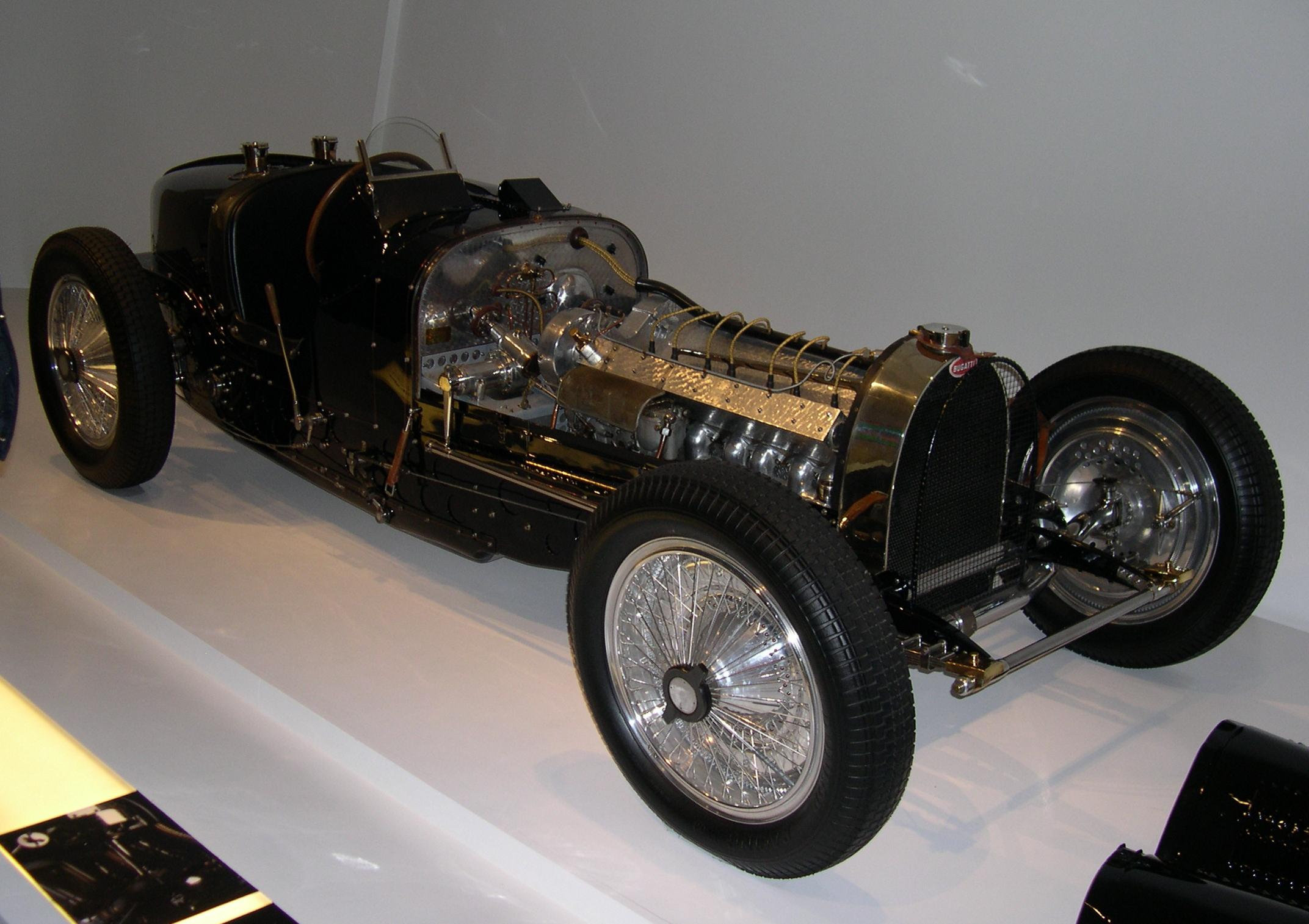
Bugatti Type 59 Grand Prix

While displaced from his home in Alsace by World War I, Bugatti designed aeroplane engines, notably the somewhat baroque 16-cylinder U-16, which was never built in any large number and was installed in only a very few aircraft. Between the wars Bugatti designed a successful motorized railcar dubbed the Autorail Bugatti, and won a government contract to construct an airplane, the Model 100. It was designed by Louis de Monge using two type 50B Bugatti engines but never flew due to the outbreak of World War II. Surgical instruments, designed by Bugatti for a friend who was a professor at a nearby hospital, are still in use to this day.

Bugatti's son, Jean, was killed on 11 August 1939 at the age of 30 while testing a Bugatti Type 57 tank-bodied race car near the Molsheim factory. After that, the company's fortunes began to decline. World War II ruined the factory in Molsheim, and the company lost control of the property. During the war, Bugatti planned a new factory at Levallois in Paris and designed a series of new cars.

Bugatti's concept of customer relations was somewhat eccentric. To a Bugatti owner who complained that his car was difficult to start on cold mornings, he is said to have retorted, "Sir! If you can afford a Type 35, you can surely afford a heated garage!" Another famous line he told to a customer complaining about the brakes in one model was, "I make my cars to go, not stop!" He was inducted into the Automotive Hall of Fame in 2000.

== Personal life ==
In 1907 Bugatti married Barbara Maria Giuseppina Mascherpa. They had two daughters, L'Ébé in 1903 and Lidia in 1907, and two sons, Jean in 1909, and Roland in 1922. His wife Barbara died in 1944, and Bugatti remarried in 1946, to Geneviève Marguerite Delcuze. They had a daughter, Thérèse in 1942 and a son, Michel in 1945.

Bugatti died at the American hospital in the inner-Paris suburb of Neuilly, in the late summer of 1947. Afflicted by the after-effects of a stroke, he had for several months been confined to the Paris apartment in the rue Boissière, which he had owned since 1916. He was almost certainly unaware of the court decision whereby his property in Alsace, which had been seized by the state in the feverish post-liberation frenzy of anger and retribution which his Italian origins had invited, was restored to him on 20 June 1947; Bugatti died just over two months later, on 21 August without having recovered consciousness. Bugatti was buried in the Bugatti family plot at the municipal cemetery in Dorlisheim, near Molsheim, in the Bas-Rhin department of France. Molsheim's Musée de la Chartreuse houses a section dedicated to his life, work, and legacy.
