= Rembrandt Bugatti =

Italian sculptor

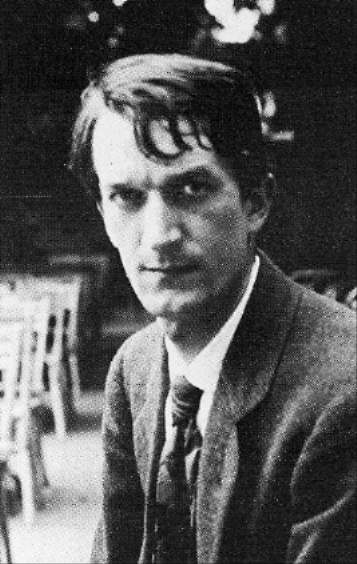
- Born: 16 October 1884; Milan, Italy
- Died: 8 January 1916 (aged 31); Paris, France
- Cause of death: Suicide
- Occupation: Sculptor
- Parents: Carlo Bugatti; Teresa Lorioli
- Relatives: Ettore Bugatti (brother); Giovanni Luigi Bugatti (paternal grandfather); Giovanni Segantini (uncle)

Rembrandt Bugatti (Italian: [buˈɡatti]; French: [bygati]; 16 October 1884 – 8 January 1916) was an Italian sculptor, known primarily for his bronze sculptures of wildlife subjects. During World War I, he volunteered for paramedical work at a military hospital in Antwerp, an experience that triggered in Bugatti the onset of depression, aggravated by financial problems, which eventually caused him to commit suicide on 8 January 1916 in Paris, France when he was 31 years old.

== Early life ==
Born in Milan into an artistic family, Rembrandt Bugatti was the second son of Carlo Bugatti and his wife, Teresa Lorioli. His older brother Ettore Bugatti became a famous automobile manufacturer.

He was given his first name by his uncle, painter Giovanni Segantini. His father was an Art Nouveau furniture and jewelry designer who also worked in textiles, ceramics, and silver metalware. As such, Rembrandt Bugatti grew up in an environment where a great many of his parents' friends were from the artistic world. In 1902, the family moved to Paris, where they lived in a community of artisans.

As a child, he hung around his father's workshop and was encouraged to try sculpting in plasticine by a family friend, Russian sculptor Prince Paolo Troubetzkoy (1866–1938).

== Work ==
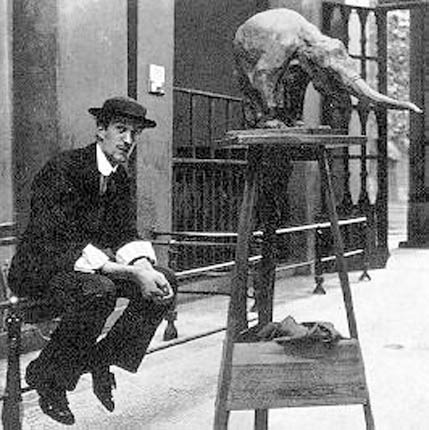
Rembrandt Bugatti at the zoo in Antwerp (1910)

Rembrandt Bugatti was a young man when he began to work with the art foundry and gallery owner, Adrian Hébrard. He produced a number of bronzes, which were exhibited and promoted by Hébrard. Bugatti's love of nature led to him spending a great deal of time in the wildlife sanctuary near the Jardin des Plantes in Paris or at the Antwerp Zoo, where he studied the features and movement of exotic animals. His sculptures of animals such as elephants, panthers, and lions became his most well-known works.

The elephant mascot that sits on top of the radiator of the Bugatti Royale was cast from one of Rembrandt's original sculptures.

His art works are now highly priced. A cast of his 1909–1910 bronze, Babouin Sacré Hamadryas (Sacred hamadryas baboon), was auctioned at Sotheby's in 2006 for $2.56 million. In May 2010, the Babouin reappeared at auction at Sotheby's (est. $2/3 million), along with a male and female Lion and Lionne de Nubie (est. $1.5/2 million and $1.2/1.8 million, respectively), a Grande girafe tête basse (est. $1/1.5 million) and seven other pieces from the S. Joel Schur Collection, perhaps the finest collection of masterpieces by Bugatti in private hands according to one report. One of the Bugatti pieces was reported sold apparently as part of a group of sculptures (with three Rodin and a Noguchi) for an aggregate of $20 million.

== Later life and death ==
His work was part of the sculpture event in the art competition at the 1912 Summer Olympics. During World War I, he volunteered for paramedical work at a military hospital in Antwerp, an experience that triggered in Bugatti the onset of depression, aggravated by financial problems arising because now he was no longer able to give so much time to his artistic work. At the same time, Antwerp Zoo was forced, by feedstuff shortages, to start killing its animals, which deeply affected Bugatti because he had used many of them as subjects for his sculptures. In 1916, at the age of 31, he committed suicide. He is interred in the Bugatti family plot at the municipal cemetery in Dorlisheim in the Bas-Rhin département of the Alsace region of France.

== Gallery ==
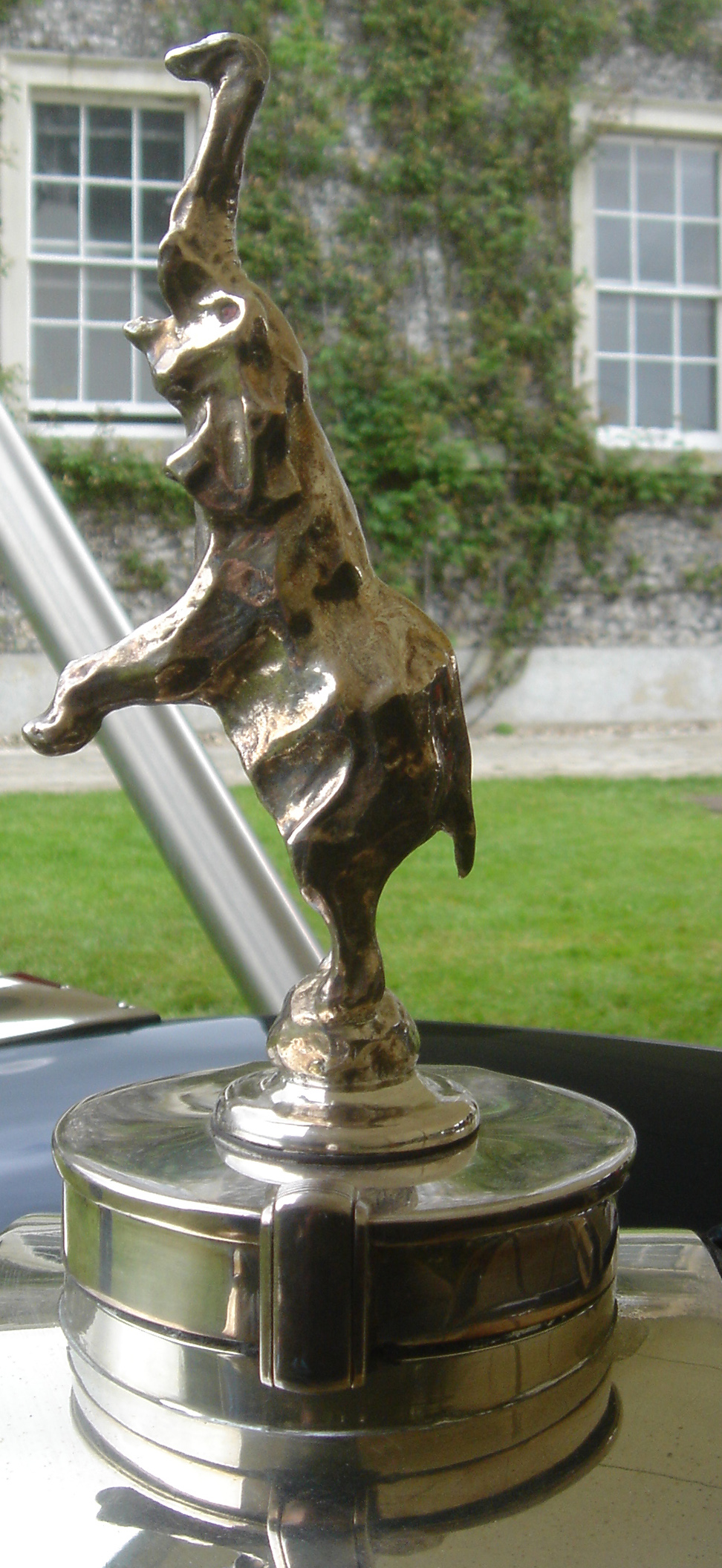
Type 41 (Royale) radiator cap

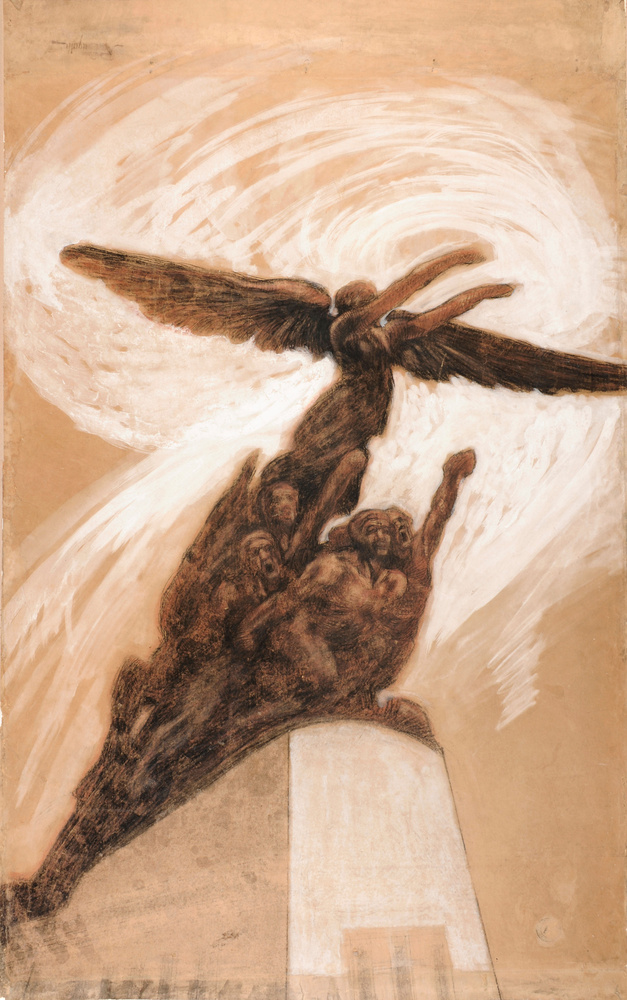
Project for a Monument − Allegory of Victory, drawing (circa 1910), Musée d'art moderne et contemporain of Strasbourg

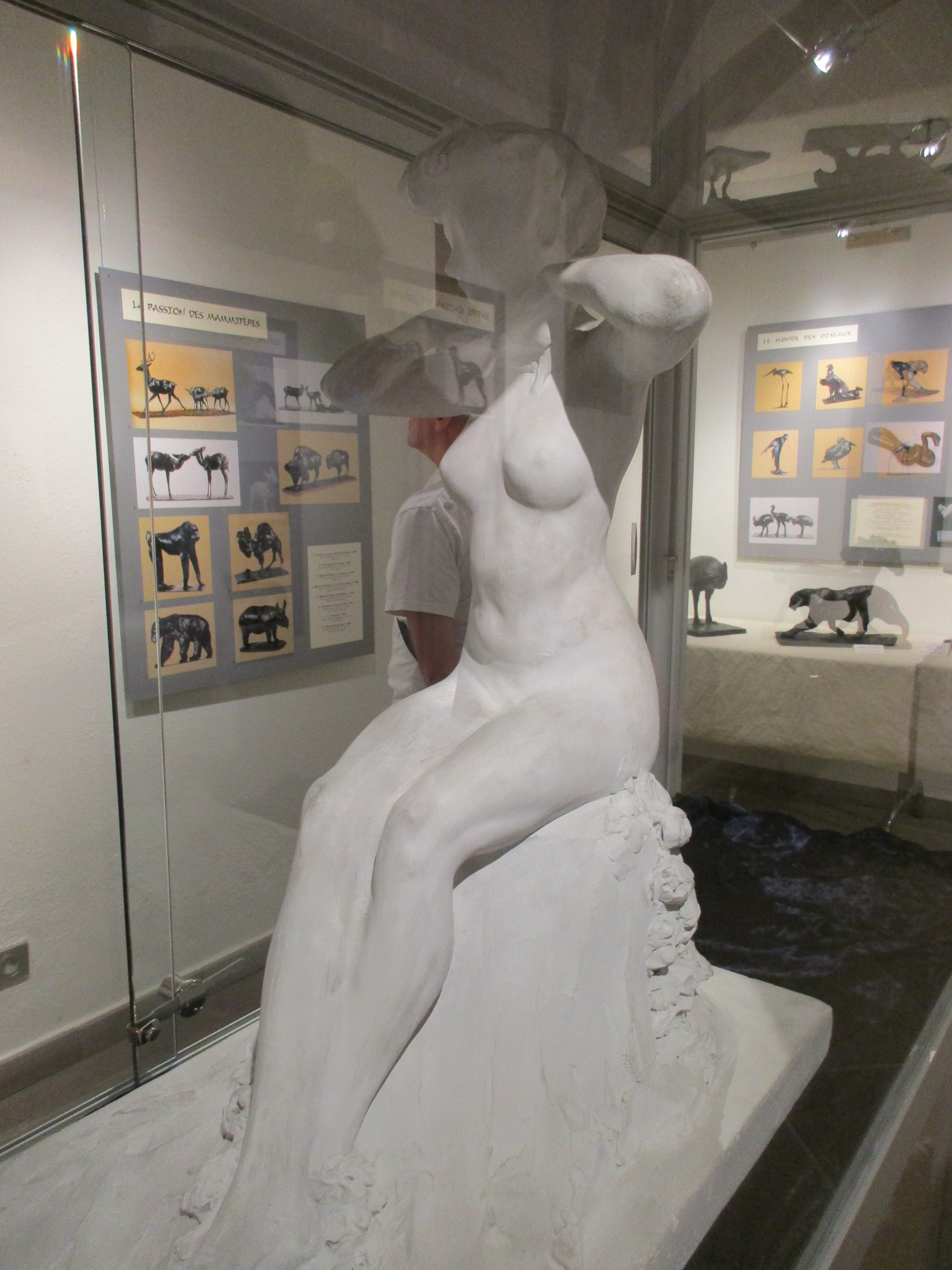
"Young female nude", 1907 (Musée de la Chartreuse, Molsheim)

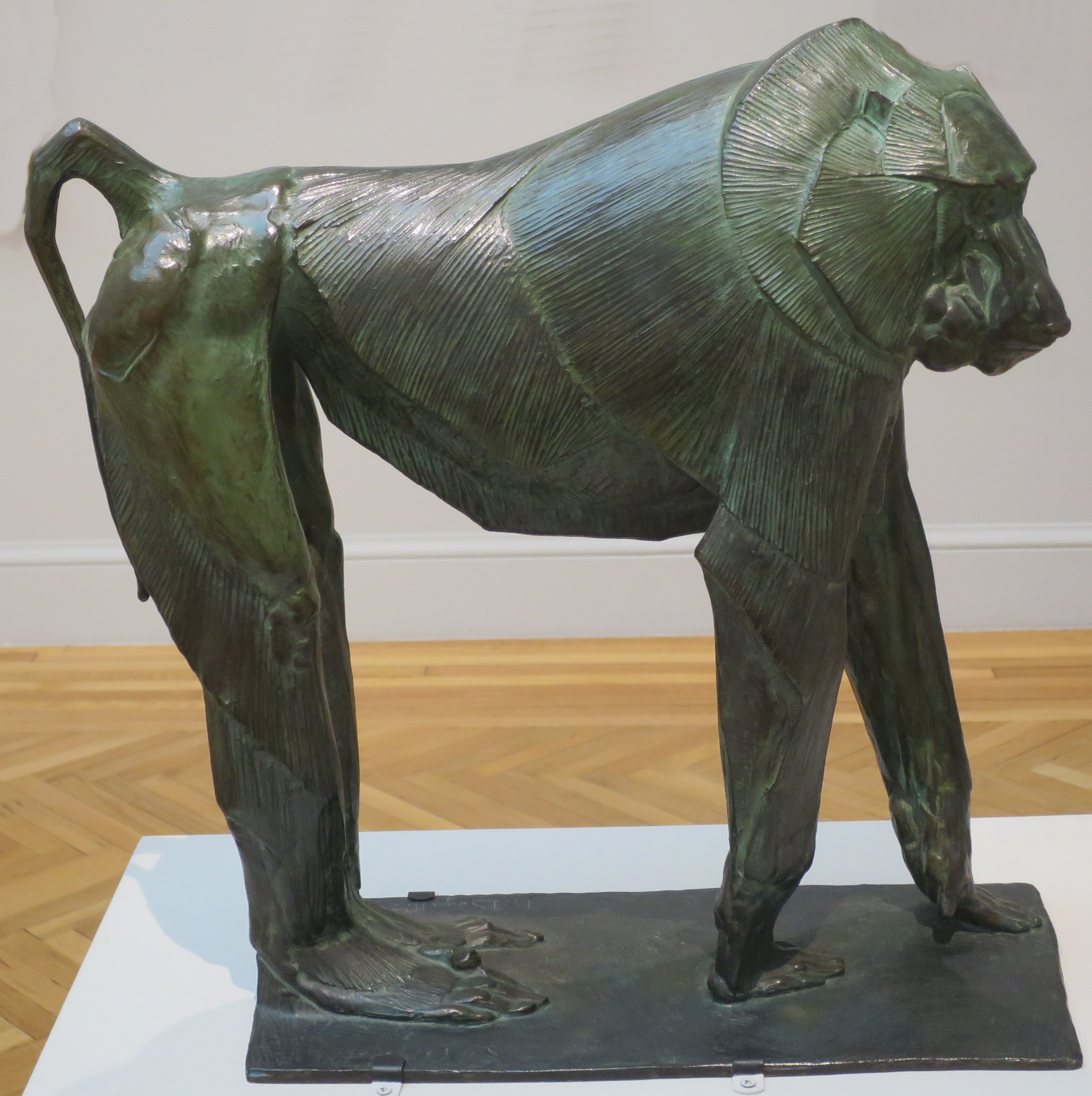
"Hamadryas baboon", circa 1910 (California Palace of the Legion of Honor)

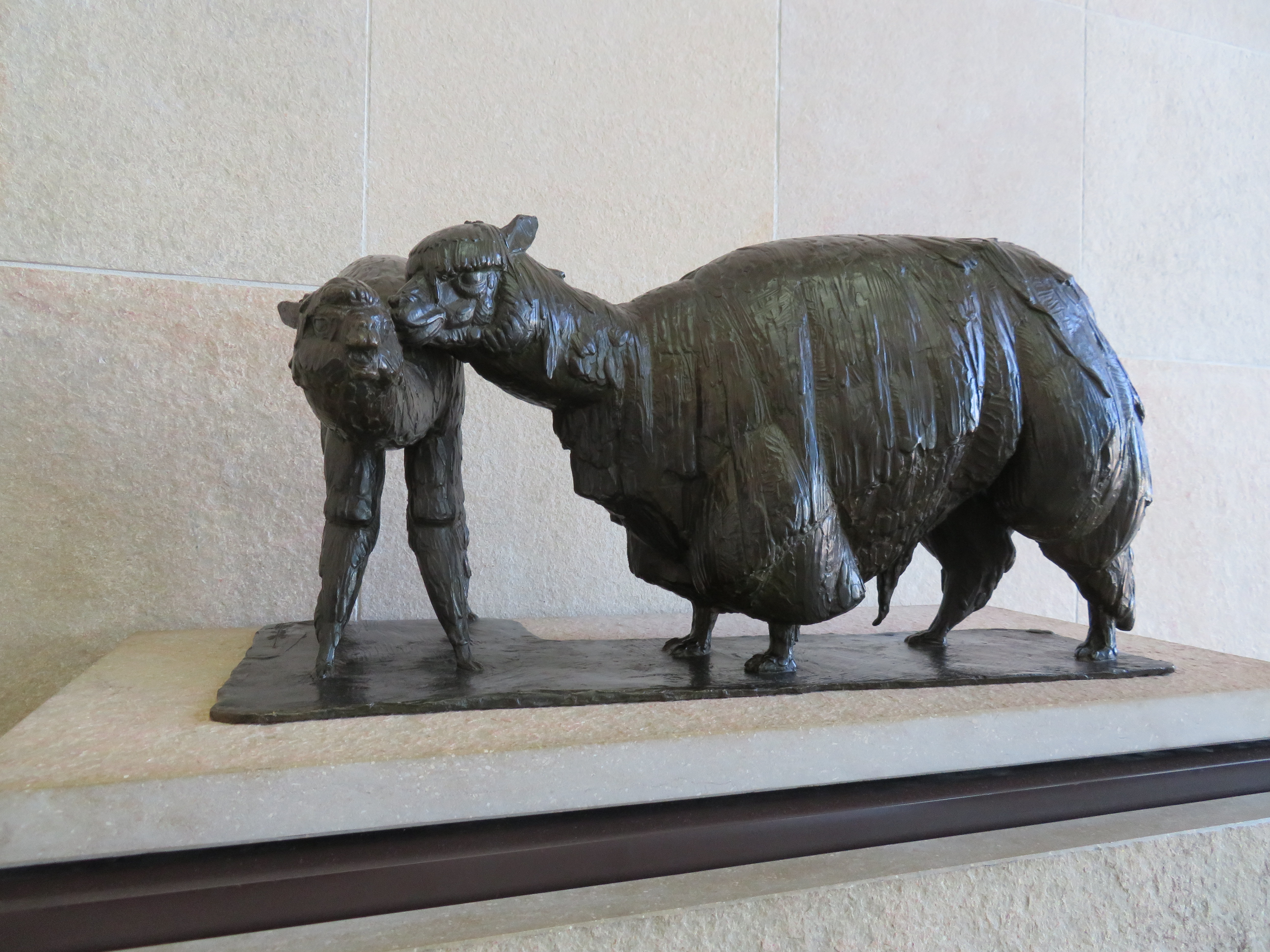
"Two llamas", 1911 (Musée d'Orsay)

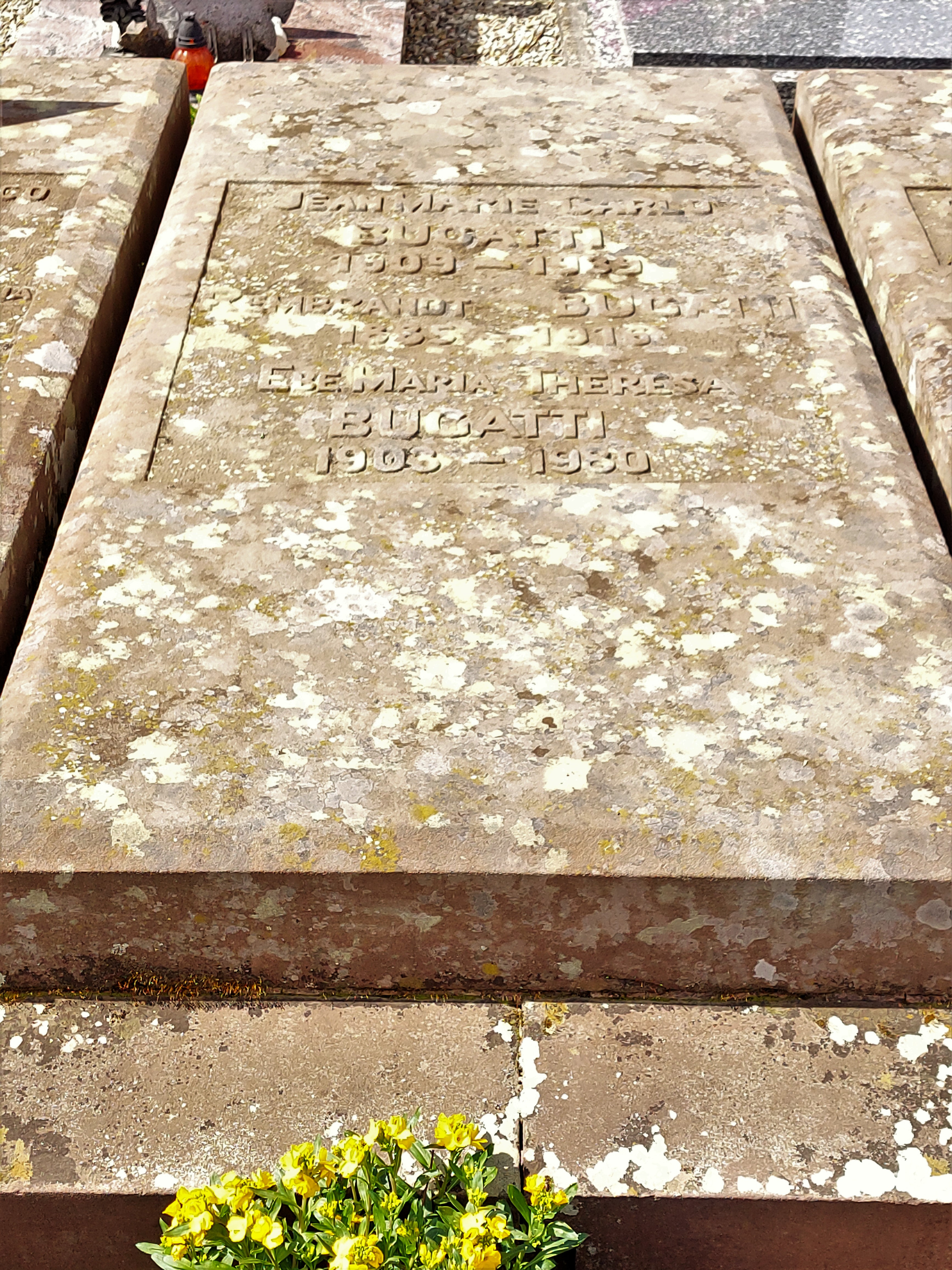
Grave of Rembrandt Bugatti in Dorlisheim
