= Jean Bugatti =

Automotive designer and test engineer (1909–1939)

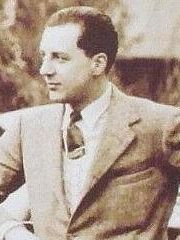
- Bugatti in 1932
- Born: Gianoberto Maria Carlo Bugatti; 15 January 1909; Cologne, Germany
- Died: 11 August 1939 (aged 30); Duppigheim, France
- Cause of death: Car accident
- Resting place: Dorlisheim, France
- Occupations: Engineer, car designer and test driver
- Years active: 1926–1939
- Father: Ettore Bugatti

Jean Bugatti (né Gianoberto Maria Carlo Bugatti; 15 January 1909 – 11 August 1939) was a French automotive designer and test engineer for Bugatti. He was the son of Bugatti's founder Ettore Bugatti.

== Biography ==
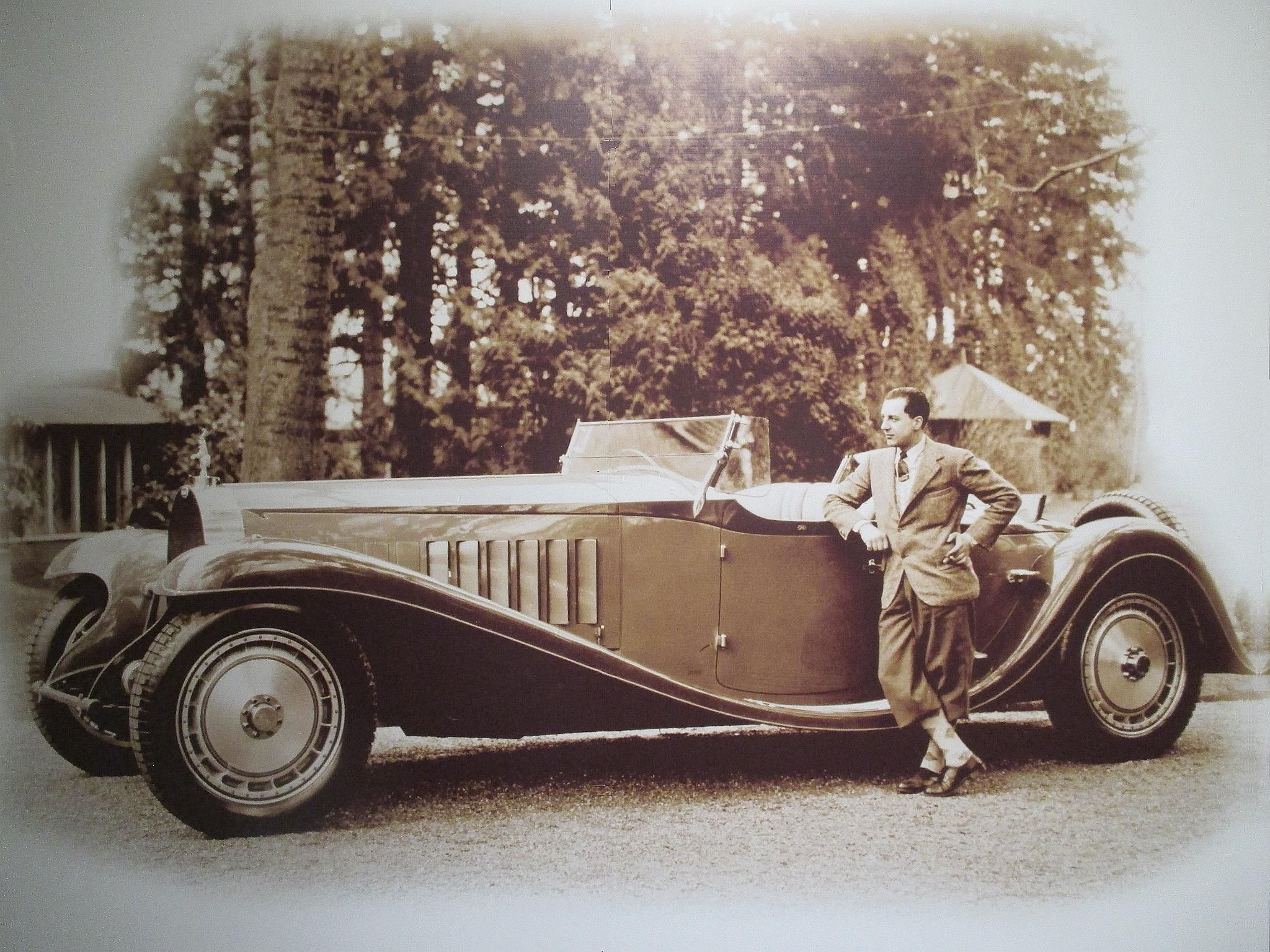
Bugatti standing next to the Royale Esders Roadster prototype in 1932

Born in Cologne, Jean Bugatti was the eldest son of Ettore Bugatti. Soon after his birth the family moved to the village of Dorlisheim near Molsheim in Alsace, Germany, where his father built the new Bugatti automobile manufacturing plant. Born into a family of creative people, from boyhood he was interested in his father's business. His grandfather Carlo Bugatti had lived in France for several years when he relocated from his native Milan to live in Paris. The Bugatti family were multilingual and in France, Gianoberto became known as Jean.

During World War I, the family lived in Milan, Italy. After the ceding of Alsace by Germany to France after the end of the war in 1919, the company became subject to French jurisdiction. By the late 1920s, young Jean Bugatti was an integral part of the company and had already demonstrated his vehicle design abilities. In 1932, at the age of twenty-three years, he did most of the design for the company's Type 41 Royale. His body designs complemented his father's engineering skill, making Bugatti one of the greatest names in automobile manufacturing. Additionally, Jean Bugatti designed four bodies for the Type 57, the Ventoux, Stelvio, Atalante and Atlantic models. Regarded as the finest of all the Bugatti touring models, the supercharged Bugatti 57 was debuted at the 1936 Paris Salon. Jean Bugatti also showed his engineering skills by working on new independent suspension systems to replace solid front axles and on twin-cam engine applications.

He frequently tested the company's prototypes. On 11 August 1939, while testing the Type 57 tank-bodied racer which had just won the 24 Hours of Le Mans race that year, not far from the factory on the road near the village of Duppigheim, 30-year-old Jean Bugatti was killed when he lost control of his vehicle and crashed into a tree after avoiding a cyclist. He is interred in the Bugatti family plot at the municipal cemetery in Dorlisheim. There is a monument to him at the site of his accident.
