= Bugatti Type 8 =

Bugatti Type 8 Bugatti Type 9

Overview
- Manufacturer: Automobiles Ettore Bugatti for Deutz
- Model code: Type 8 Type 9
- Also called: Deutz 65 PS; Deutz 50 PS; Deutz 45 PS; Deutz 35 PS; Deutz Prinz Henri; Bugatti Prinz Henri; Bugatti-Deutz
- Production: 1906–1909
- Model years: 1907–1910
- Assembly: Germany: Cologne
- Designer: Ettore Bugatti

Body and chassis
- Body style: Roadster
- Layout: Front Engine, RWD
- Chassis: Ladder frame

Powertrain
- Engine: see table
- Transmission: 4-speed manual

Dimensions
- Wheelbase: 3,098–3,280 millimetres (122.0–129.1 in)
- Length: 5,500–6,150 millimetres (217–242 in)
- Width: 1,500–1,677 millimetres (59.1–66.0 in)
- Height: 1,340–1,500 millimetres (53–59 in)

Chronology
- Predecessor: Bugatti Type 6
- Successor: Bugatti Type 10

The Type 8 and Type 9 were cars designed by Ettore Bugatti for Deutz from 1907 to 1910. These used extremely Undersquare Inline 4's. The only version of the car that raced was under the name "Prinz Henri", which was the official model name of the code 8A-S and 9A. The car proved to be innefective at racing, because the chassis of the Type 8, without an engine or body, would weigh as much as 935.0 kilograms (2,061.3 pounds), with the later Type 9's only reducing the weight to 880.0 kilograms (1,940.1 pounds).

Type Name	Bore	Stroke	Displacement	Engine Type	Valves	Horsepower	Torque	Weight	Wheelbase	Years
Type 8	150 millimetres (5.9 in)	150 millimetres (5.9 in)	10,602 cc (647.0 cu in; 10.602 L)	Inline four	8 valve OHC	78 bhp (79 PS; 58 kW)	430 N⋅m (320 lb⋅ft)	1,800 kg (4,000 lb)	3,098 millimetres (122.0 in)	1907–1909
Type 8A	145 millimetres (5.7 in)	150 millimetres (5.9 in)	9,908 cc (604.6 cu in; 9.908 L)	Inline four	8 valve OHC	65 bhp (66 PS; 48 kW)	375 N⋅m (277 lb⋅ft)	1,715 kg (3,781 lb)	3,100 millimetres (120 in)	1907–1909
Type 8B	124 millimetres (4.9 in)	130 millimetres (5.1 in)	6,279 cc (383.2 cu in; 6.279 L)	Inline four	8 valve OHC	45 bhp (46 PS; 34 kW)	300 N⋅m (220 lb⋅ft)	1,681 kg (3,706 lb)	3,100 millimetres (120 in)	1907–1909
Type 8C	110 millimetres (4.3 in)	130 millimetres (5.1 in)	4,942 cc (301.6 cu in; 4.942 L)	Inline four	8 valve OHC	35 bhp (35 PS; 26 kW)	275 N⋅m (203 lb⋅ft)	1,500 kg (3,300 lb)	3,100 millimetres (120 in)	1907–1909
Type 8A-S Type 9A Prinz Henri	145 millimetres (5.7 in)	160 millimetres (6.3 in)	10,569 cc (645.0 cu in; 10.569 L)	Inline four	8 valve OHC	75 bhp (76 PS; 56 kW)	400 N⋅m (300 lb⋅ft)	1,766 kg (3,893 lb)	3,100 millimetres (120 in)	1907–1910
Type 9B	124 millimetres (4.9 in)	130 millimetres (5.1 in)	6,279 cc (383.2 cu in; 6.279 L)	Inline four	8 valve OHC	45 bhp (46 PS; 34 kW)	300 N⋅m (220 lb⋅ft)	1,681 kg (3,706 lb)	3,180 millimetres (125 in)	1909–1910
Type 9B-A	124 millimetres (4.9 in)	130 millimetres (5.1 in)	6,279 cc (383.2 cu in; 6.279 L)	Inline four	8 valve OHC	45 bhp (46 PS; 34 kW)	300 N⋅m (220 lb⋅ft)	1,681 kg (3,706 lb)	3,280 millimetres (129 in)	1909–1910
Type 9C	110 millimetres (4.3 in)	130 millimetres (5.1 in)	4,942 cc (301.6 cu in; 4.942 L)	Inline four	8 valve OHC	35 bhp (35 PS; 26 kW)	275 N⋅m (203 lb⋅ft)	1,500 kg (3,300 lb)	3,180 millimetres (125 in)	1909–1910
Type 9C-A	110 millimetres (4.3 in)	130 millimetres (5.1 in)	4,942 cc (301.6 cu in; 4.942 L)	Inline four	8 valve OHC	35 bhp (35 PS; 26 kW)	275 N⋅m (203 lb⋅ft)	1,500 kg (3,300 lb)	3,280 millimetres (129 in)	1909–1910
Type 9B-S	124 millimetres (4.9 in)	140 millimetres (5.5 in)	6,763 cc (412.7 cu in; 6.763 L)	Inline four	8 valve OHC	51 bhp (52 PS; 38 kW)	333 N⋅m (246 lb⋅ft)	1,700 kg (3,700 lb)	3,180 millimetres (125 in)	1909–1910
Type 9C-S	110 millimetres (4.3 in)	160 millimetres (6.3 in)	6,082 cc (371.1 cu in; 6.082 L)	Inline four	8 valve OHC	48 bhp (49 PS; 36 kW)	281 N⋅m (207 lb⋅ft)	1,623 kg (3,578 lb)	3,180 millimetres (125 in)	1909–1910
