= Bugatti Type 1 =

Bugatti Type 1 Prinetti & Stucchi Type 1
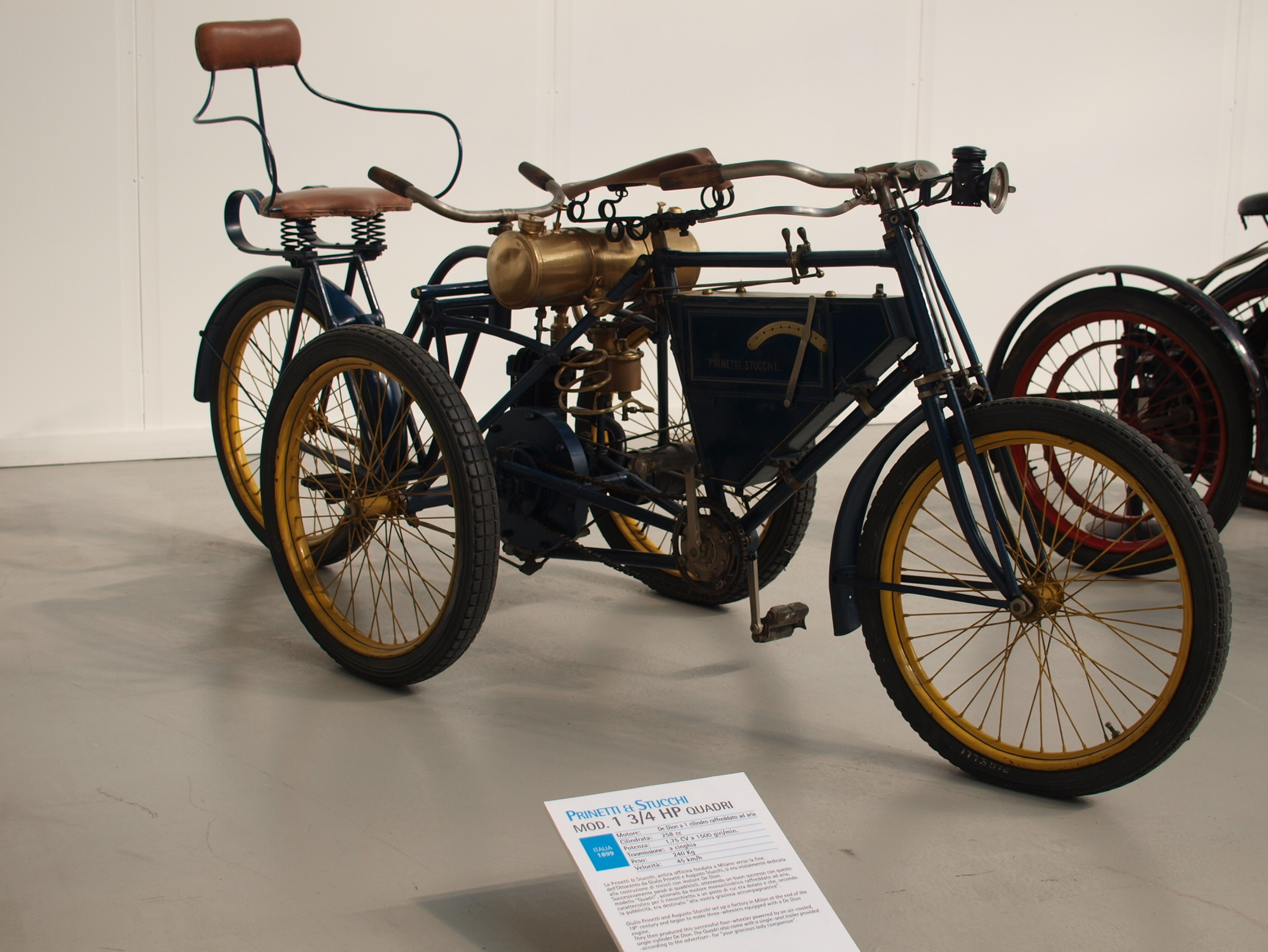

Overview
- Manufacturer: Prinetti & Stucchi
- Model years: 1898-1900 (4 made, 1 converted to Bugatti Type 2)
- Assembly: Milan
- Designer: Ettore Bugatti

Body and chassis
- Chassis: Motorcycle Converted into a Tricycle

Powertrain
- Engine: 1, 2, or 4 De Dion-Bouton Singles each motor being 301.5 cc (18.40 cu in; 0.3015 L)
- Power output: See Table
- Transmission: 3-speed Manual

Dimensions
- Wheelbase: 1,897 mm (74.7 in) (Type 1); 1,548 mm (60.9 in) (Type 0)
- Length: 2,000 mm (79 in) (Type 1); 1,898 mm (74.7 in) (Type 0)
- Width: 333 mm (13.1 in) (Type 1); 349 mm (13.7 in) (Type 0)
- Height: 1,470 mm (58 in) (Type 1); 1,622 mm (63.9 in) (Type 0)
- Kerb weight: 231 kg (509 lb) (Type 0); 195 kg (430 lb) (Single Motor); 235 kg (518 lb) (Dual Motor); 270 kg (600 lb) (Quad Motor)

Chronology
- Successor: Bugatti Type 2

The Bugatti Type 1 or Prinetti & Stucchi Type 1 was an automobile designed by Ettore Bugatti and produced by Prinetti & Stucchi in 1899. It had four engines, two on each side of the rear axle. The first real production Bugatti was the Bugatti Type 13. At the age of 17, Ettore Bugatti won a race at Reggio Emilia on the Type 1.

== Type 0 ==
The Type 0 was the original "Bugatti" branded vehicle, being constructed in 1897; it was originally a Prinetti & Stucchi motorcycle, however it was fitted with two De Dion-Bouton motors, which made it significantly more powerful than the 0.75 hp (0.76 PS; 0.56 kW) 98 cc (6.0 cu in) Single in the Prinetti and Stucchi, with a 400 cc (24 cu in) 2.25 hp (2.28 PS; 1.68 kW) De Dion-Bouton twin. Bugatti would describe it as "Lethargically slow but fantastic handling". The vehicle would have three wheels. The car was a proof of concept for Bugatti for the Type 1. The car would be dubbed the Type 0 in 1913, and before then be labelled as just the "1897 Bugatti". It would ultimately remain a one off, and would be destroyed in World War I.

== Type 1 ==
The Type 1 was designed by Bugatti while he was an apprentice at Prinetti & Stucchi. When the 1899 Reggio Emilia race was announced, Ettore was allowed to convert a Prinetti & Stucchi into a Tricycle so he could race with it. This original Type 1 was fitted with two De Dion-Bouton Singles, which unlike the Type 0 would be two engines put together instead of just a twin. The car was a tricycle. The versions with multiple engines would be labelled the "Type 1/1" for the single motor version, "Type 1/2" for the twin motor version, and the "Type 1/4" for the quad motor version.

== Engines ==
Name	Displacement	Horsepower	Horsepower RPM	Torque	Torque RPM	Weight
Type 0	400 cc (24.4 cu in; 0.4 L)	2.25 hp (2.28 PS; 1.68 kW)	1,850	6.8 N⋅m (5 lb⋅ft)	1,000	231 kg (509.3 lb)
Type 1/1	301.5 cc (18.4 cu in; 0.3 L)	3 hp (3.04 PS; 2.24 kW)	3,000	11.25 N⋅m (8.30 lb⋅ft)	2,200	195 kg (429.9 lb)
Type 1/2	603 cc (36.8 cu in; 0.6 L)	6 hp (6.08 PS; 4.47 kW)	3,400	22.5 N⋅m (16.6 lb⋅ft)	2,000	235 kg (518.1 lb)
Type 1/4	1,206 cc (74 cu in; 1 L)	12 hp (12.17 PS; 8.95 kW)	3,700	45 N⋅m (33.19 lb⋅ft)	1,800	270 kg (595.2 lb)
