= De Dietrich-Bugatti =

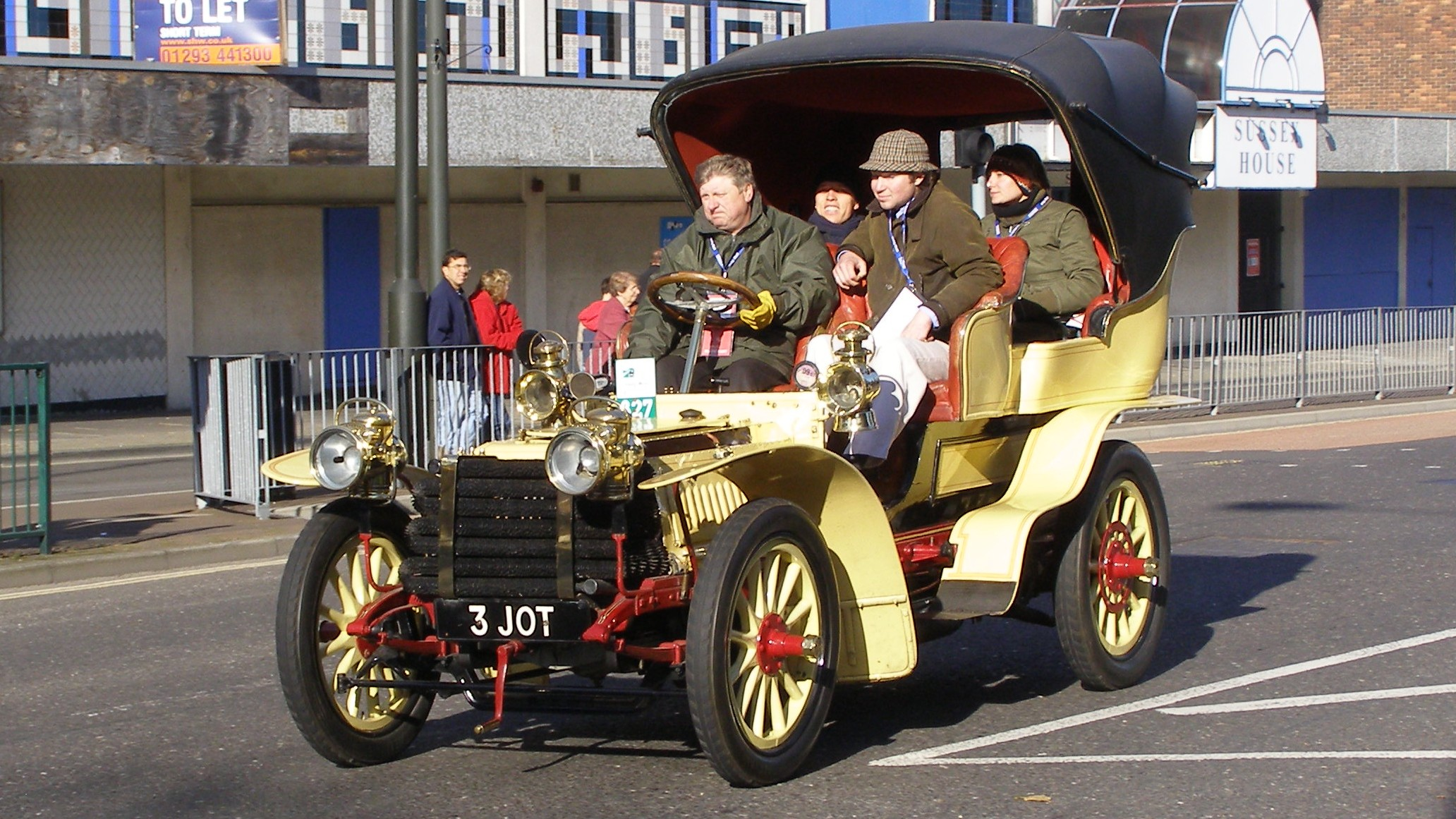
Lorraine-Dietrich branded Bugatti Type 3

De Dietrich Bugatti refers colloquially to a number of early automobile designs by Ettore Bugatti, known as the Types 2 through 7. Importantly, the vehicle known as the Type 2 of 1901 was designed by Bugatti before he joined the automobile manufacturer Lorraine-Dietrich in Niederbronn, Alsace, Germany following its successful reception. Types 3-7 were produced for De Dietrich between 1902 and 1904.

== Type 2 ==
Bugatti Type 2
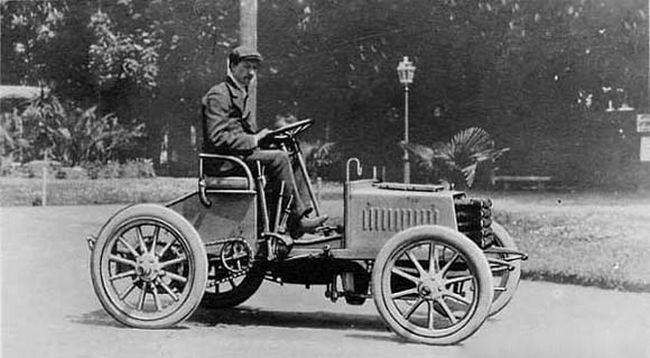
- Ettore Bugatti on the Type 2 in 1902

Overview
- Manufacturer: Lorraine-Dietrich
- Production: 1900-1903
- Assembly: Milan
- Designer: Ettore Bugatti

Powertrain
- Engine: See Table

Chronology
- Predecessor: Bugatti Type 1

The Type 2 was a prototype automobile designed and built by Ettore Bugatti in 1901 with financial support from a Count Gulinelli. It won an award at the Milan Trade Fair that year, and gained the notice of Baron Adrien de Turckheim, managing director of the Lorraine-Dietrich automobile factory in Niederbronn in the then-German Alsace.

== Type 3, 4, and 5 ==
Bugatti Type 3; Bugatti Type 4; Bugatti Type 5
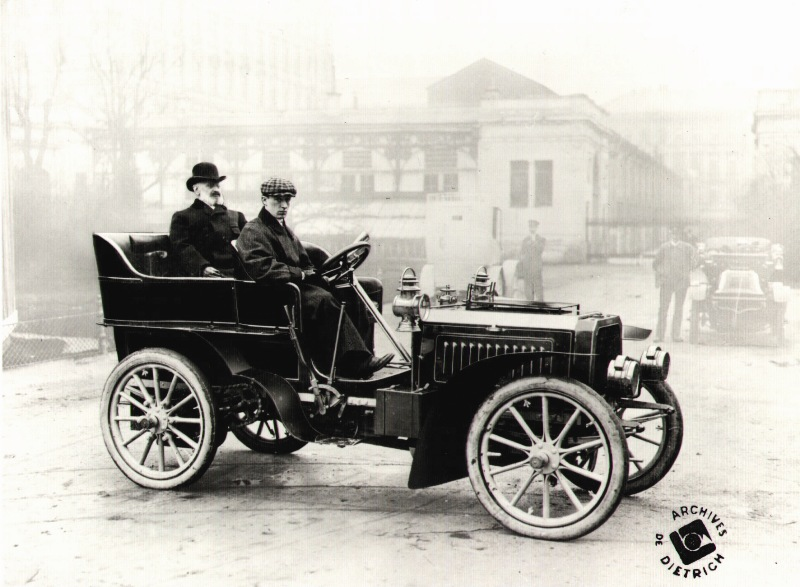

Overview
- Manufacturer: Lorraine-Dietrich
- Also called: De Dietrich-Bugatti; De Dietrich 24/28 CV (Type 3); De Dietrich 30/35 CV (Type 4); De Dietrich 50/60 CV (Type 5)
- Production: 1901-1904
- Assembly: Niederbronn-les-Bains
- Designer: Ettore Bugatti

Powertrain
- Engine: See Table

Types 3,4, and 5 were Bugatti's initial works for De Dietrich.

Type 3, 4, and 5

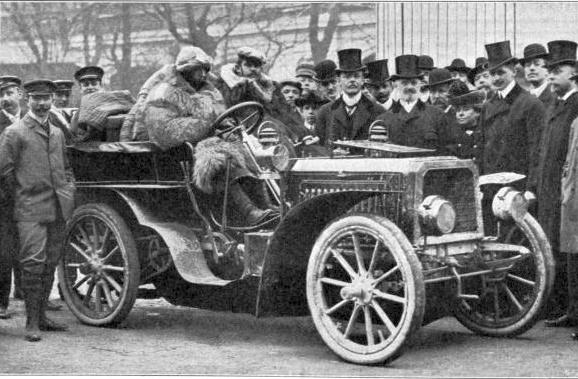
Ettore Bugatti his De Dietrich-Bugatti Type 3 (1902).

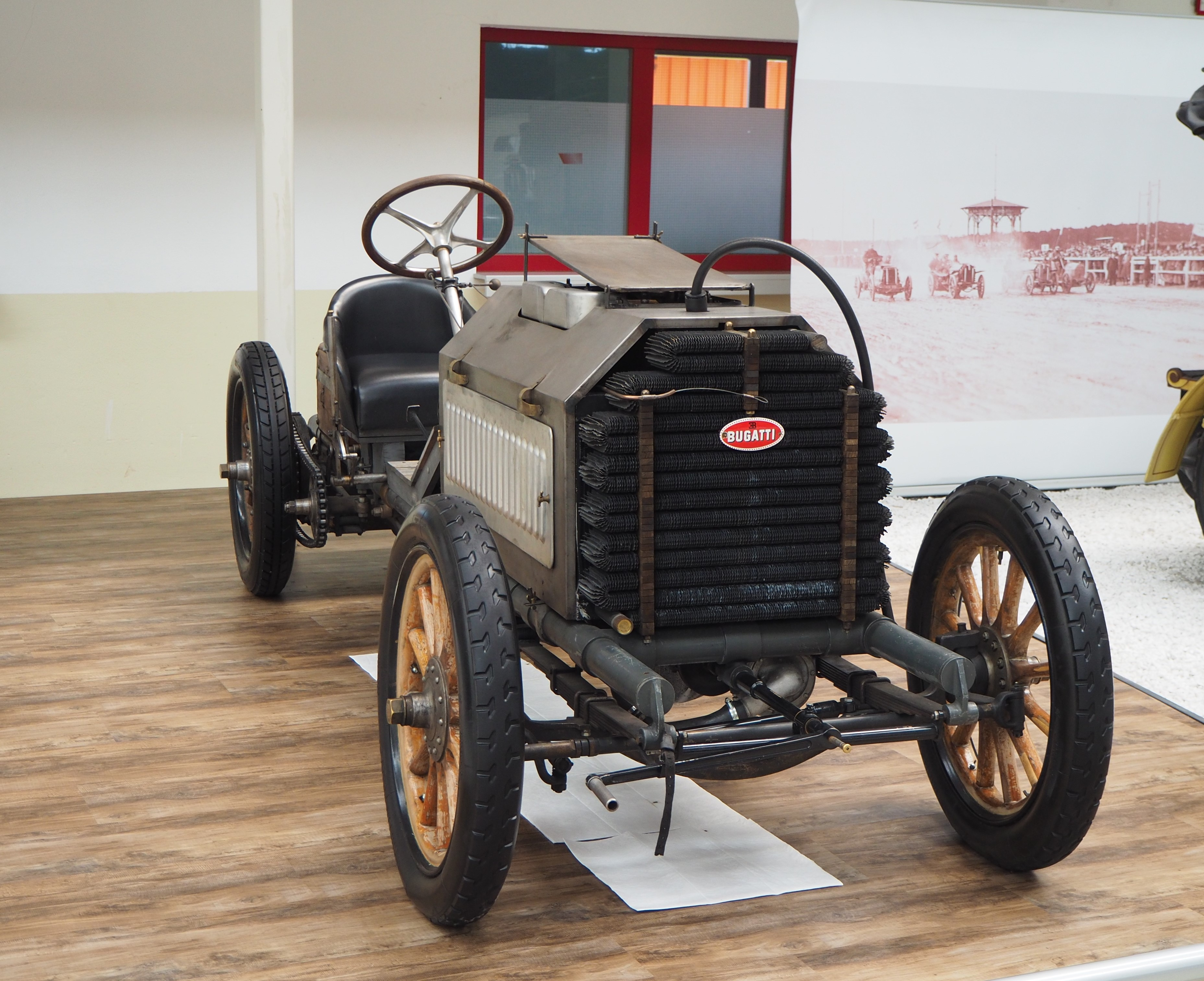
1905 Bugatti Type 5 replica

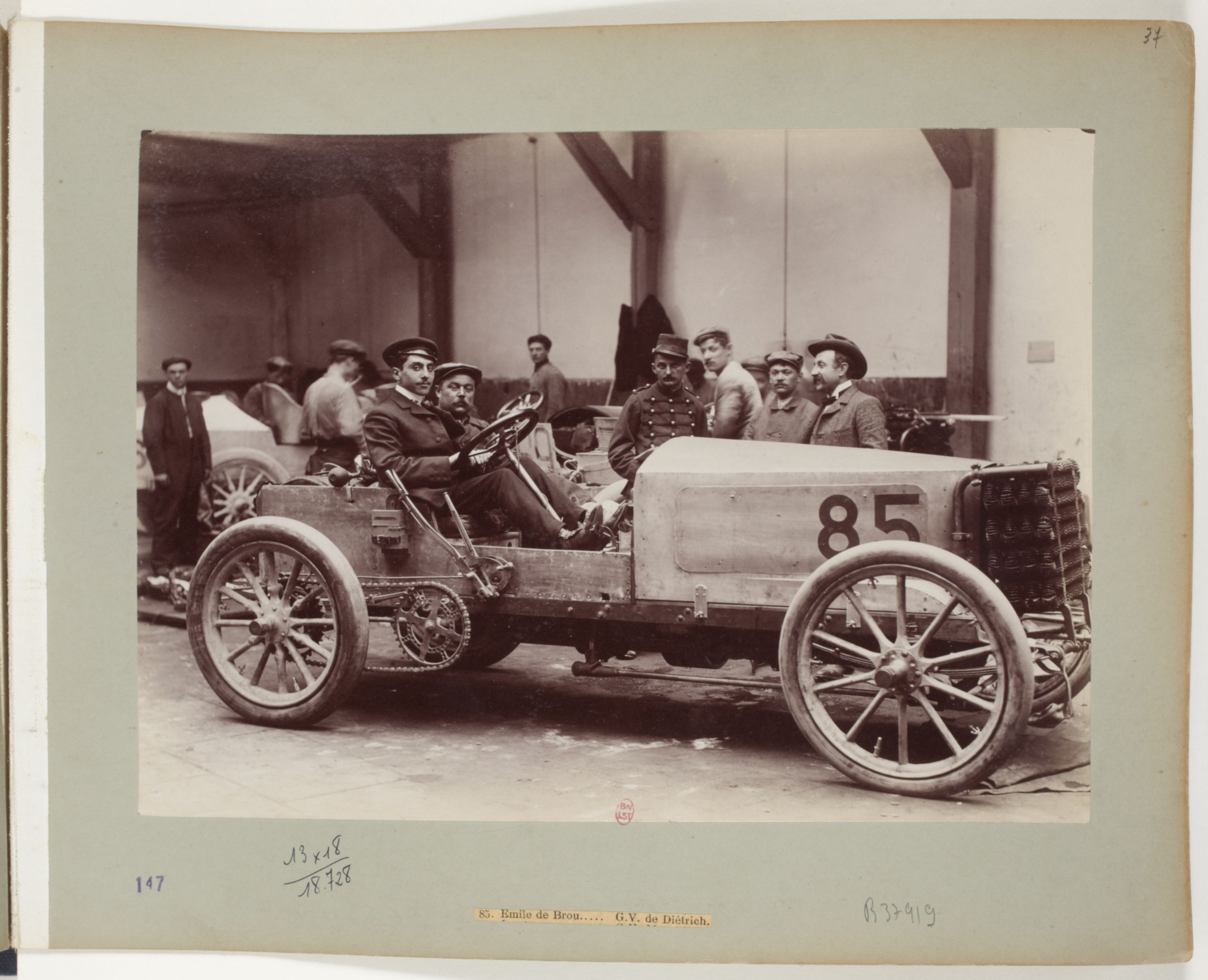
The original Type 5, taken before the 1903 Paris–Madrid race

== Type 6 and 7 ==
Bugatti Type 6; Bugatti Type 7
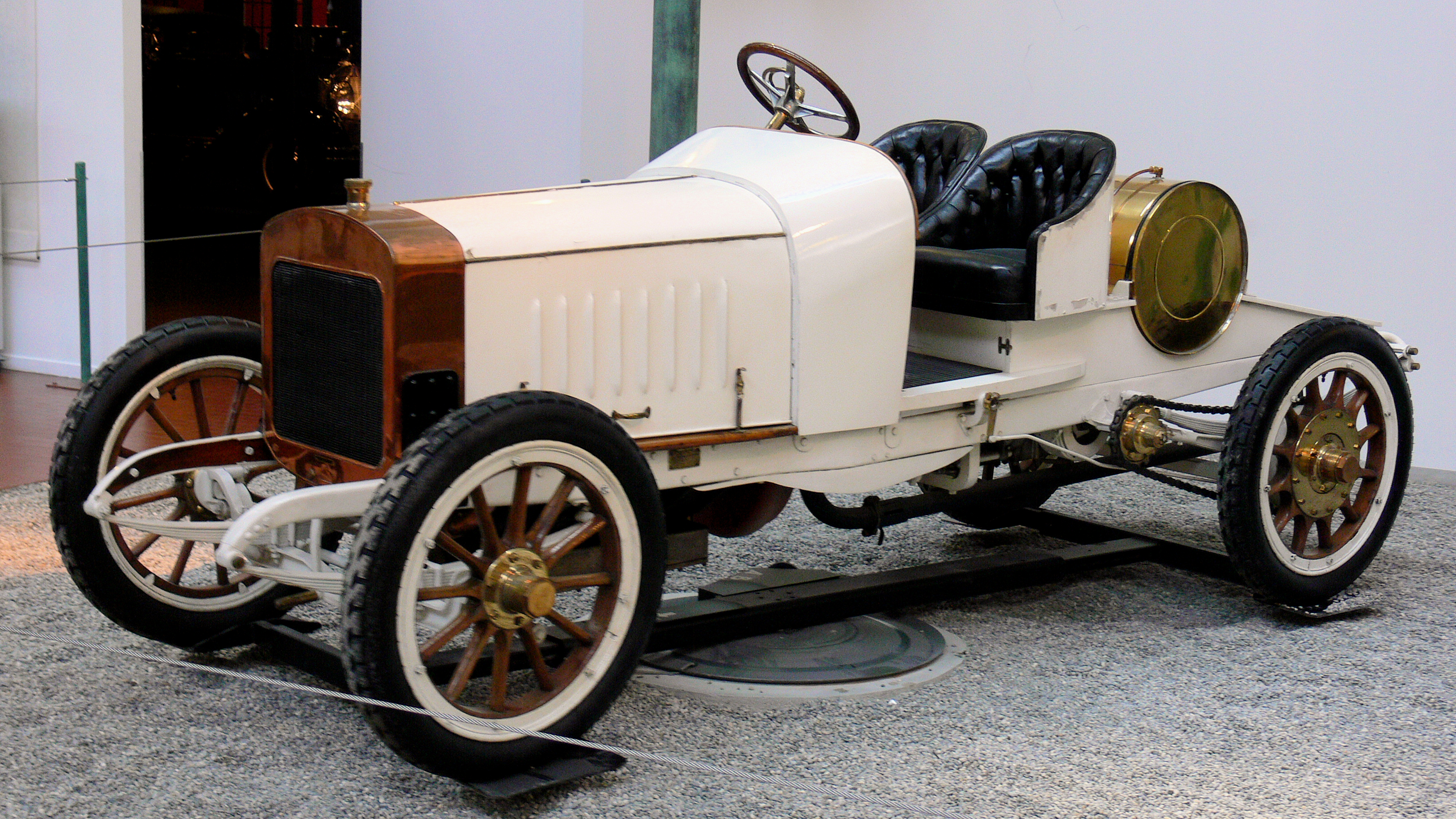

Overview
- Manufacturer: Mathis
- Also called: Mathis Hermes Simplex; Hermes; Bugatti Hermes
- Production: 1904-1907
- Assembly: Illkirch-Graffenstaden
- Designer: Ettore Bugatti

Powertrain
- Engine: See Table

Chronology
- Successor: Bugatti Type 8

Types 6 and 7 were also designed by Bugatti while with De Dietrich through 1904. Approximately 100 Types 2-7 were produced from 1902 through 1904.

== Specifications ==
| Type | Engine Type | Transmission | Displacement | Horsepower | Horsepower RPM | Torque | Torque RPM | Weight | Length | Width | Height | Wheelbase |
|---|---|---|---|---|---|---|---|---|---|---|---|---|
| Type 2 | Inline 4 Ohv | 4-Speed Manual | 3,054 cc (186.4 cu in; 3.1 L) | 12 hp (8.9 kW) | 2,500 | 30 N⋅m (22.1 lb⋅ft) | 2,200 | 650 kg (1,433.0 lb) | 3,670 mm (144.5 in) | 1,430 mm (56.3 in) | 1,560 mm (61.4 in) | 2,000 mm (78.7 in) |
| Type 3 De Dietrich 24/28 CV | Inline 4 Ohv | 4-Speed Manual | 5,038 cc (307.4 cu in; 5.0 L) | 20 hp (14.9 kW) | 3,200 | 61.5 N⋅m (45.4 lb⋅ft) | 1,800 | 1,000 kg (2,204.6 lb) | 4,080 mm (160.6 in) | 1,500 mm (59.1 in) | 1,521 mm (59.9 in) (Without Phaeton) 1,780 mm (70.1 in) (With Phaeton) | 2,250 mm (88.6 in) |
| Type 4 De Dietrich 30/35 CV | Inline 4 Ohv | 4-Speed Manual | 7,740 cc (472.3 cu in; 7.7 L) | 35 hp (26.1 kW) | 3,200 | 88 N⋅m (64.9 lb⋅ft) | 2,000 | 1,100 kg (2,425.1 lb) | 4,304 mm (169.4 in) | 1,500 mm (59.1 in) | 1,588 mm (62.5 in) (Without Phaeton) 1,886 mm (74.3 in) (With Phaeton) | 2,250 mm (88.6 in) |
| Type 5 De Dietrich 50/60 CV | Inline 4 Ohv | 3-Speed Manual | 12,868 cc (785.3 cu in; 12.9 L) | 60 hp (44.7 kW) | 3,000 | 155 N⋅m (114.3 lb⋅ft) | 1,800 | 1,000 kg (2,204.6 lb) | 4,369 mm (172.0 in) | 1,500 mm (59.1 in) | 1,340 mm (52.8 in) | 2,250 mm (88.6 in) |
| Type 6 50/65 PS | Inline 4 Ohv | 4-Speed Manual | 7,430 cc (453.4 cu in; 7.4 L) | 50 hp (37.3 kW) | 3,700 | 88 N⋅m (64.9 lb⋅ft) | 2,000 | 1,100 kg (2,425.1 lb) | 4,150 mm (163.4 in) | 1,540 mm (60.6 in) | 1,340 mm (52.8 in) | 2,930 mm (115.4 in) |
| Type 6 60/75 PS | Inline 4 Ohv | 4-Speed Manual | 7,430 cc (453.4 cu in; 7.4 L) | 60 hp (44.7 kW) | 3,700 | 102 N⋅m (75.2 lb⋅ft) | 2,000 | 1,100 kg (2,425.1 lb) | 4,150 mm (163.4 in) | 1,540 mm (60.6 in) | 1,340 mm (52.8 in) | 2,930 mm (115.4 in) |
| Type 7 60/90 PS | Inline 4 Ohv | 4-Speed Manual | 8,986 cc (548.4 cu in; 9.0 L) | 60 hp (44.7 kW) | 3,700 | 125 N⋅m (92.2 lb⋅ft) | 2,000 | 1,100 kg (2,425.1 lb) | 4,365 mm (171.9 in) | 1,625 mm (64.0 in) | 1,340 mm (52.8 in) | 2,930 mm (115.4 in) |
| Type 7 90/115 PS | Inline 4 Ohv | 4-Speed Manual | 12,058 cc (735.8 cu in; 12.1 L) | 90 hp (67.1 kW) | 3,700 | 156 N⋅m (115.1 lb⋅ft) | 2,000 | 1,100 kg (2,425.1 lb) | 4,365 mm (171.9 in) | 1,625 mm (64.0 in) | 1,340 mm (52.8 in) | 2,930 mm (115.4 in) |

== See also ==
- Bugatti
