= Carlo Bugatti =

Italian furniture designer (1856–1940)

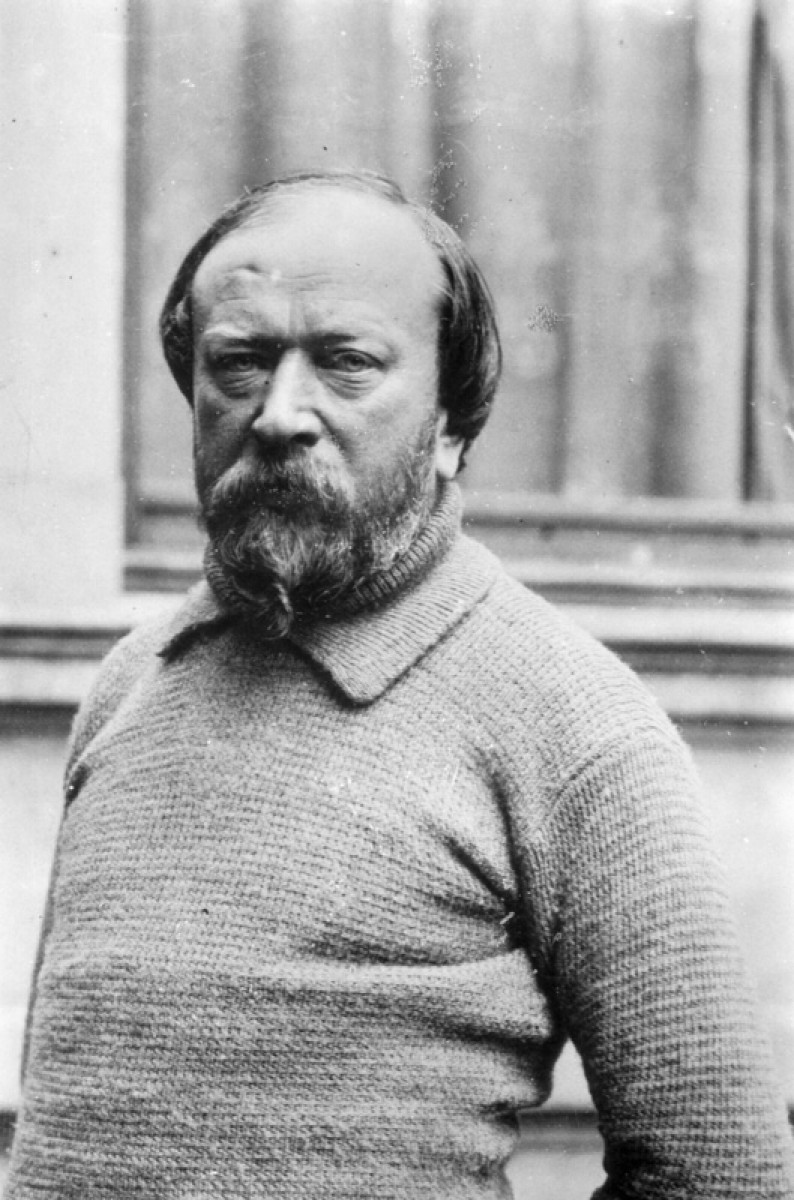
- Bugatti in 1920
- Born: 2 February 1856; Milan, Kingdom of Lombardy–Venetia, Austrian Empire
- Died: April 1940 (age 84); Molsheim, France
- Education: Brera Academy; Académie des Beaux-Arts
- Occupation: Designer
- Spouse: Teresa Lorioli
- Children: 2, including Ettore and Rembrandt
- Relatives: Giovanni Segantini (brother-in-law)

Carlo Bugatti (Italian: [buˈɡatti]; French: [bygati]; 2 February 1856 – April 1940) was an Italian decorator, designer, and manufacturer of Art Nouveau furniture, models of jewelry, and musical instruments.

== Biography ==
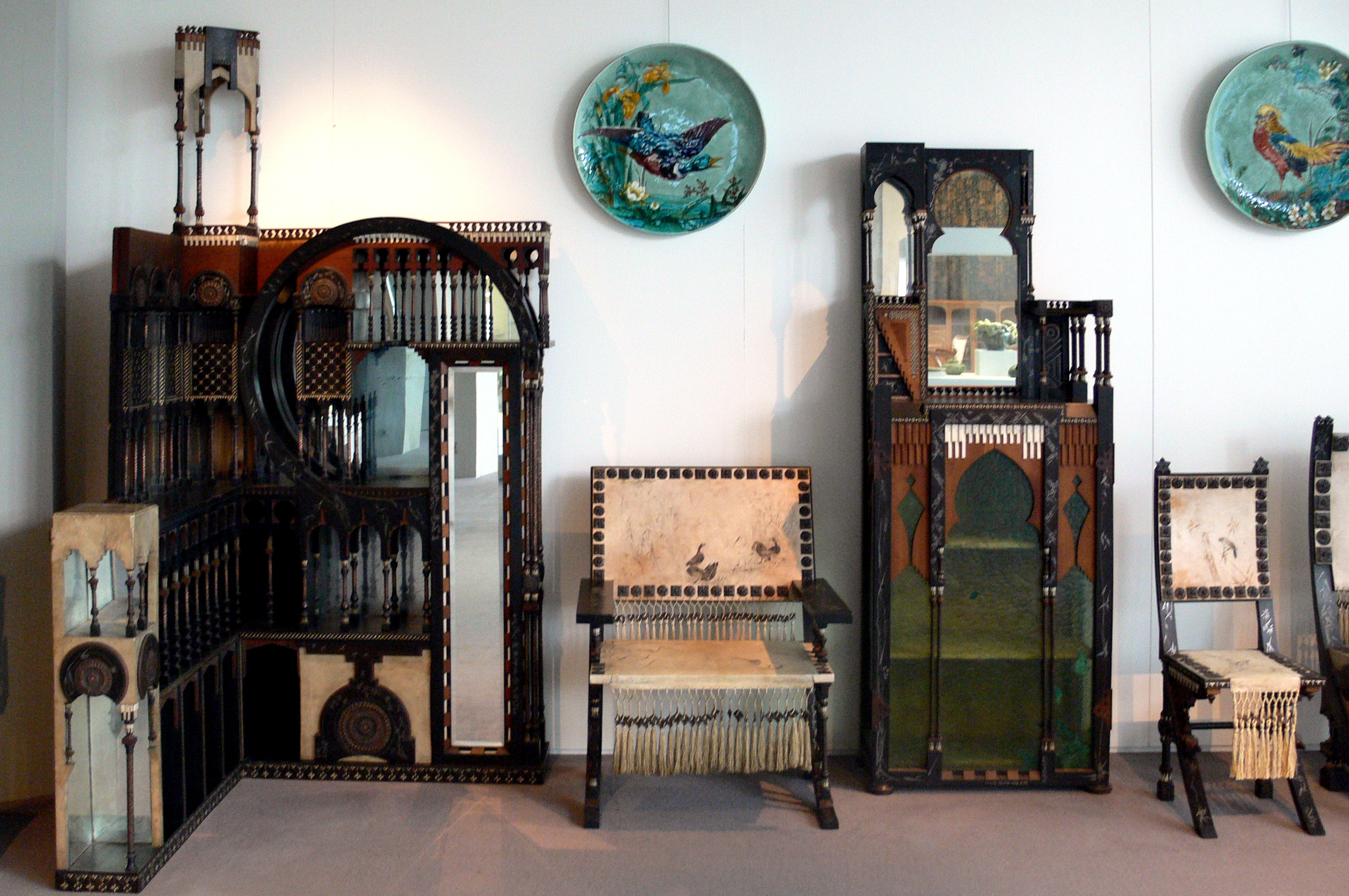
Furniture by Carlo Bugatti (Kunstgewerbemuseum Berlin)

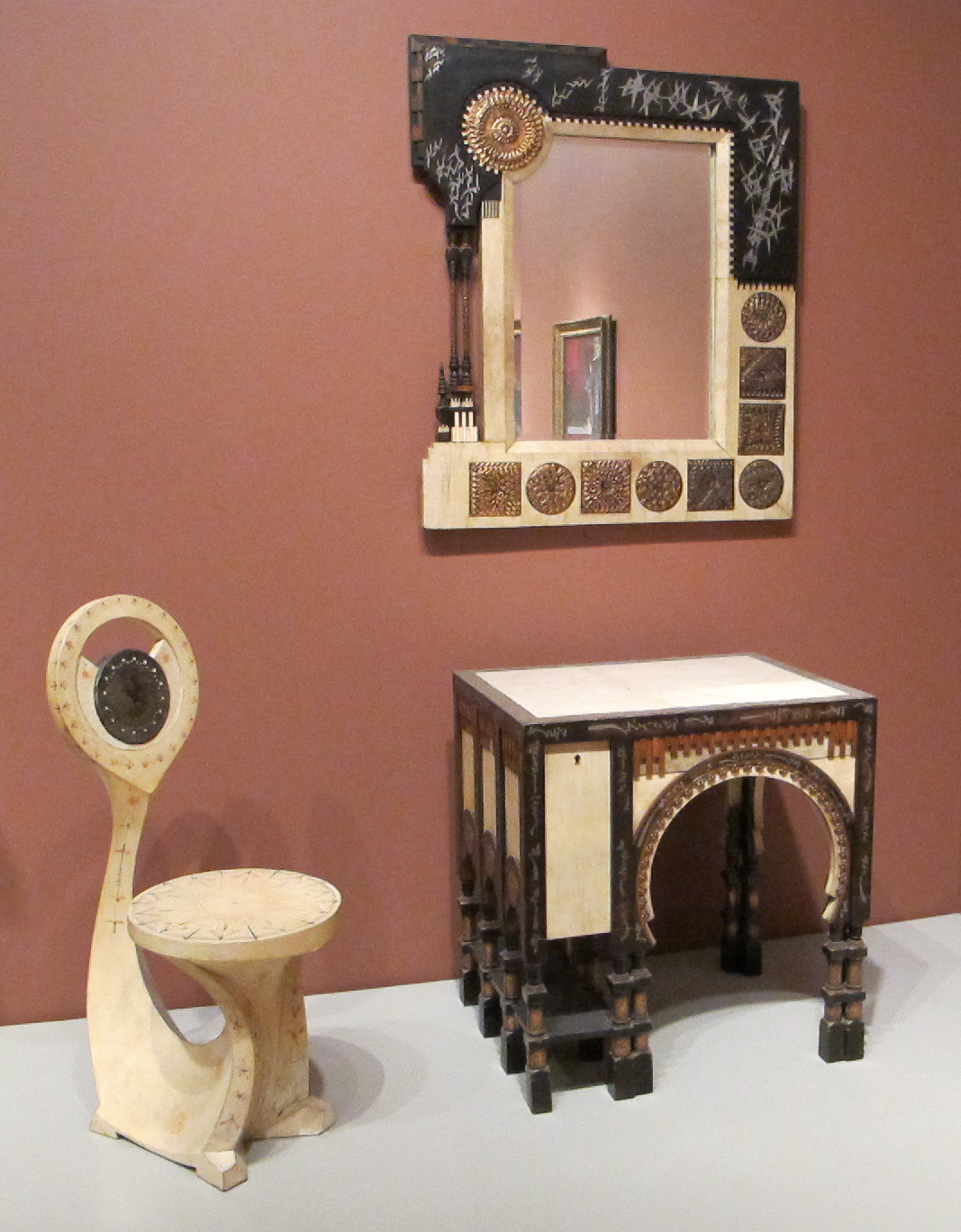
Furniture at Art Institute of Chicago

Son of Giovanni Luigi Bugatti, a specialist in interior decoration, Carlo Bugatti was born 2 February 1856 in Milan, in what was until 1859 the kingdom of Lombardy. Bugatti studied firstly at the Brera Academy in Milan, and subsequently, from 1875, at the Académie des Beaux-Arts in Paris. In 1880, he started to manufacture furniture in Milan, later transferring to France. From 1888, he began to be successful beyond Italy. Nevertheless, until 1904 he maintained a Milan workshop in the city's Via Castelfiardo 6.

Bugatti triumphed at the exhibition of decorative art in Turin in 1902 and returned to Paris in 1904. He was also, like his father, trained as an architect, but there is no evidence that any of his architectural designs were ever executed.

Father of sculptor Rembrandt Bugatti and automobile manufacturer Ettore Bugatti, he moved in 1910 to Pierrefonds where he established an atelier. From 1914 to 1918 he was nominated mayor of the village, and the outspoken anti-German industrialist Adolphe Clément-Bayard, who lived at the Domaine du Bois d'Aucourt, entrusted its upkeep to him. From then on, he devoted himself entirely to painting.

After the suicide of his son Rembrandt in 1916, Bugatti, then 60, produced less, but he remained influential.

In 1935, at the age of 79, he retired near his son Ettore's family in Alsace. He settled in a flat north of Château Saint-Jean, Dorlisheim, with his wife Teresa (who died shortly afterwards), at the domain of promotion of Bugatti property of his son Ettore.

Carlo Bugatti spent his last months at his apartment at the Bugatti factory in Molsheim, where he frequented the workmen and the house of 'the Hardtmühle', living with Ettore and his family.

In April 1940, he died at the hospital in Molsheim. He is buried in the Bugatti family cemetery at Dorlisheim. The Bugatti section of Molsheim's municipal Musée de la Chartreuse displays works and items in his remembrance.
