= Musée de la Chartreuse, Molsheim =

Municipal museum of Molsheim, France

Coordinates: 48°32′34.50″N 7°29′25.50″E

- Musée de la Chartreuse
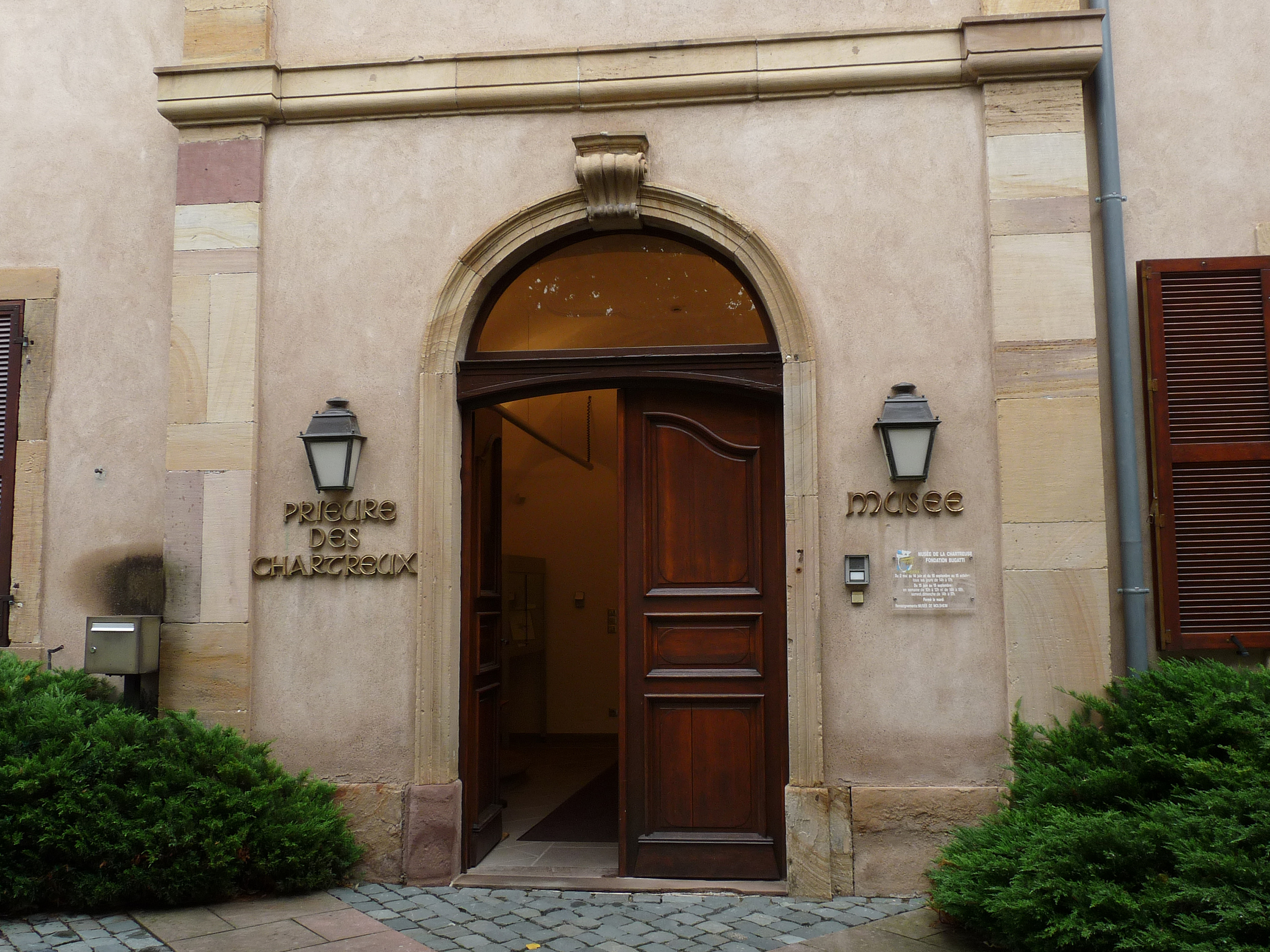
- Entrance of the museum
- Established: 1946; 80 years ago
- Location: Molsheim, France
- Collections: religious art folk art history automotive industry
- Website: www.molsheim.fr/decouvrir/musee-chartreuse-molsheim.htm

The Musée de la Chartreuse ("Charterhouse museum") is the municipal museum of Molsheim, a small town in the Bas-Rhin department of France. Founded in 1946 by Henri Gerlinger (1899–1959), it is located since 1985 in the former Carthusian monastery, which had been active from 1598 until its disbandment during the French Revolution, in 1792.

With a surface of 3 hectares (7.4 acres), the charterhouse used to be a genuine city within the city. The remaining buildings still cover a vast area. The museum includes the great cloister, several reconstructed monastic cells, and some 18th-century reception rooms, and is in part dedicated to the history of the premises. Other sections of the museum include local history (among which the Jesuit college), religious art, and regional folk art. A special section is administered by the "Bugatti Foundation" (Fondation Bugatti), and displays designs, cars, and personal objects from the estate of Ettore Bugatti, as well as works by Carlo, and Rembrandt Bugatti.

== Gallery ==
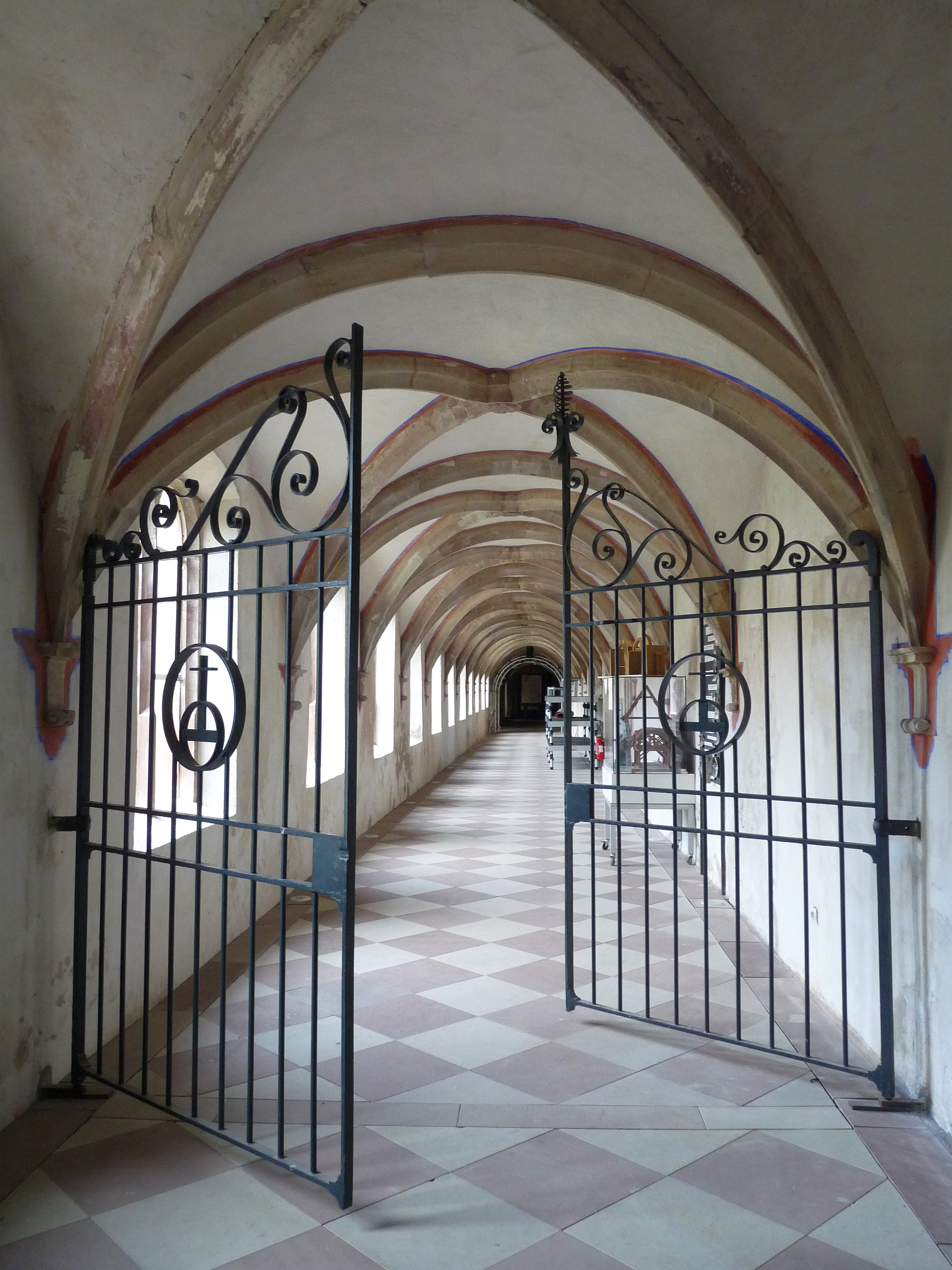
A gallery of the great cloister

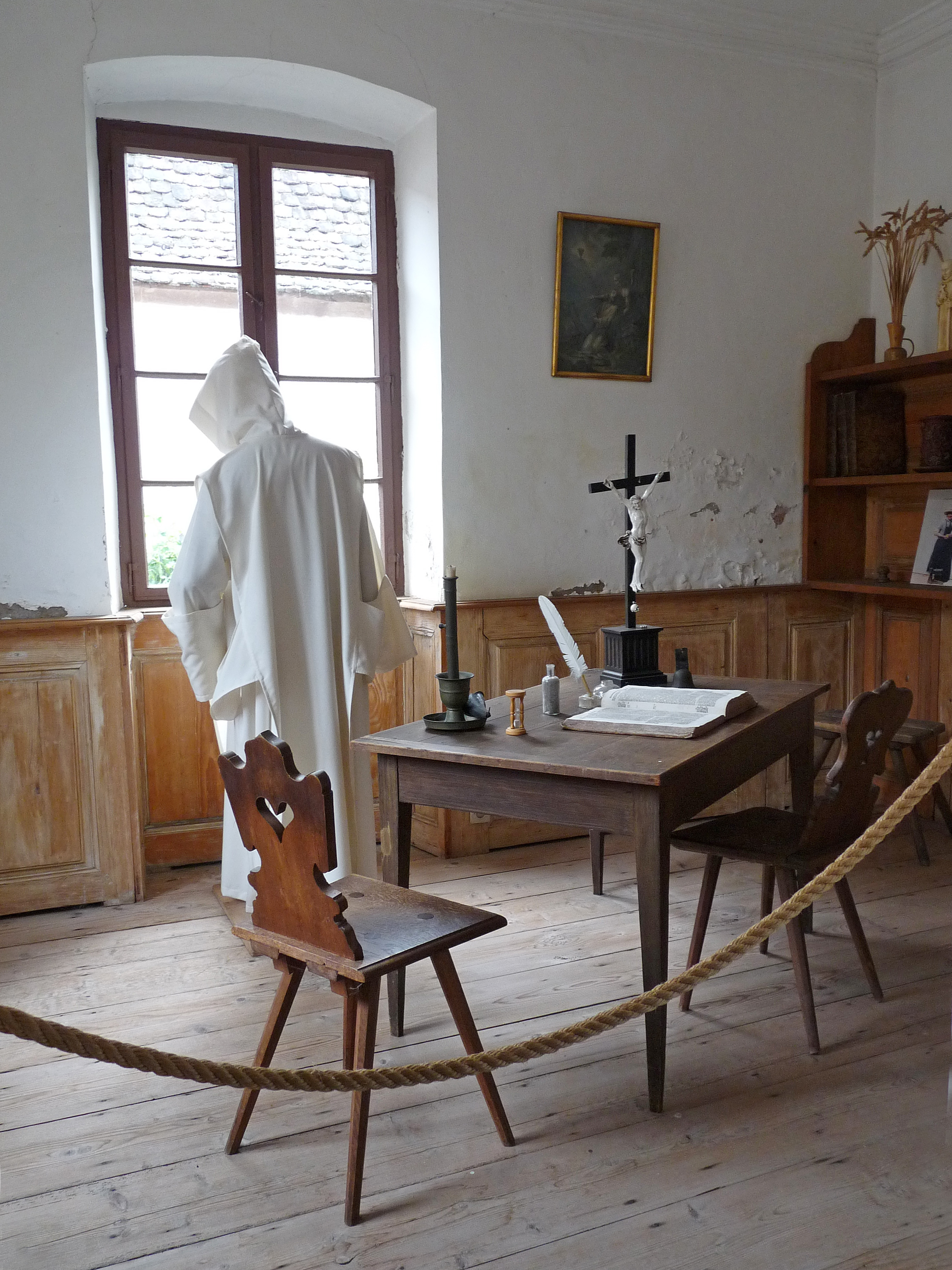
A monastic cell

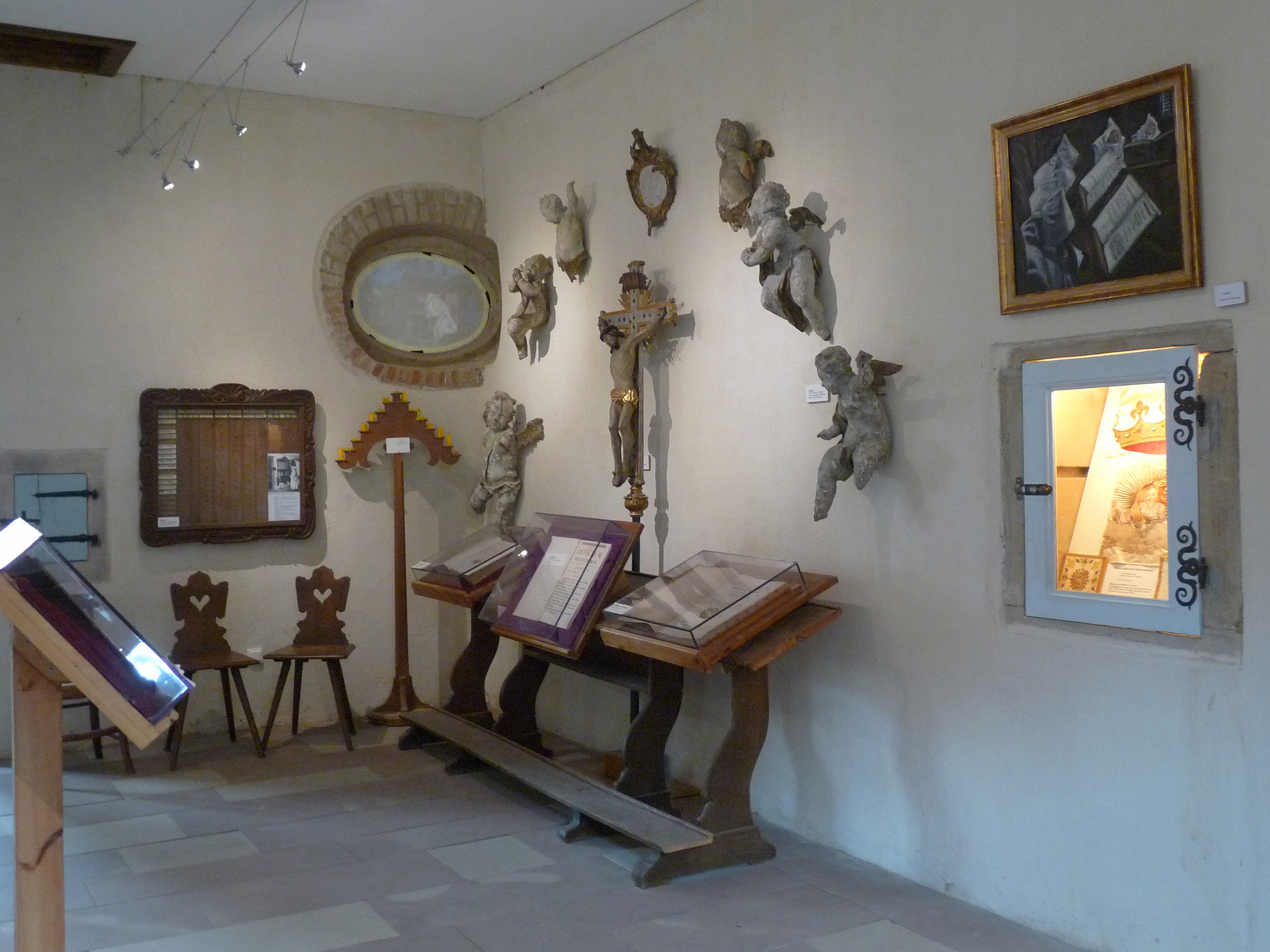
Religious objects

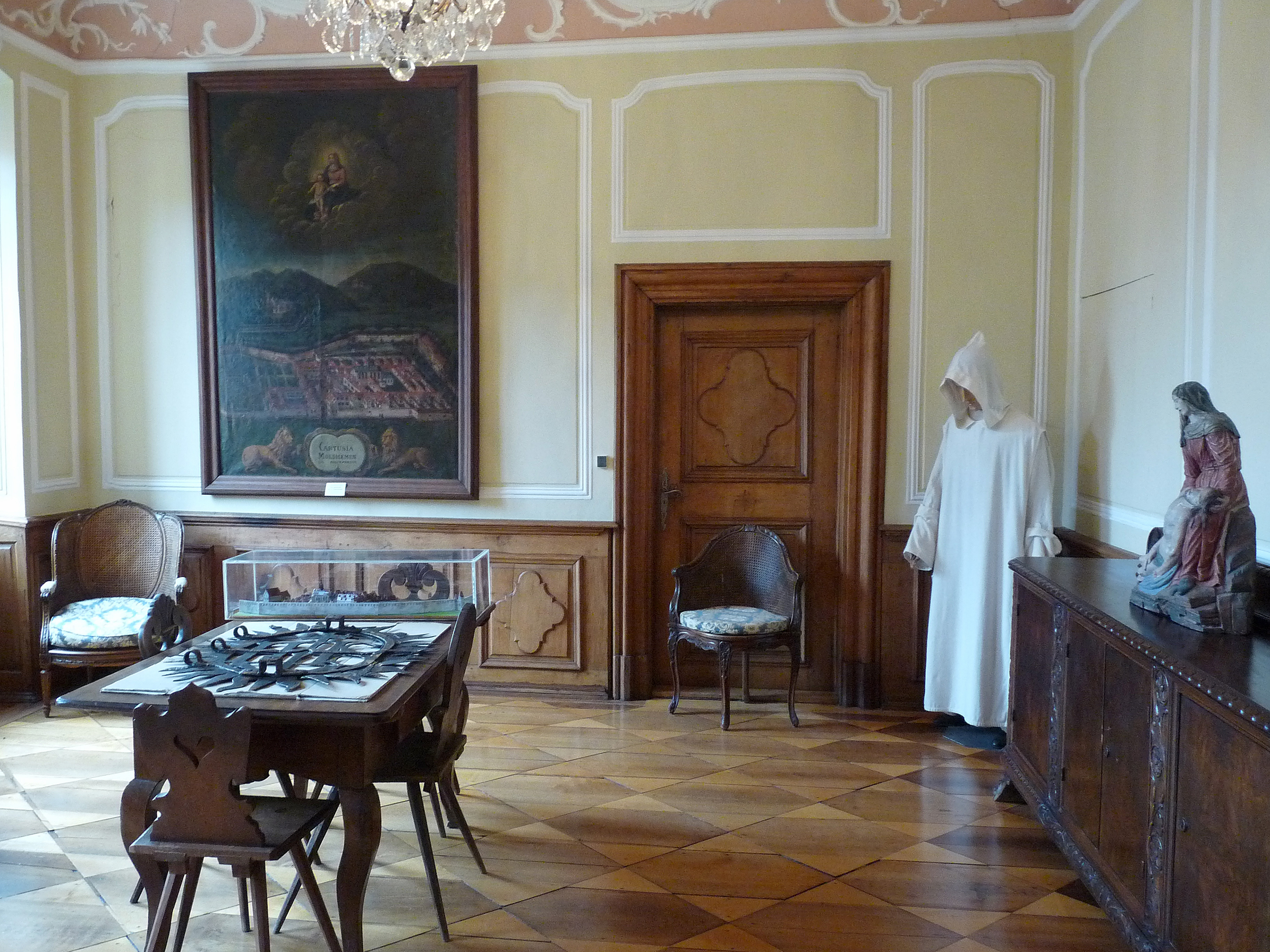
A former 18th-century room

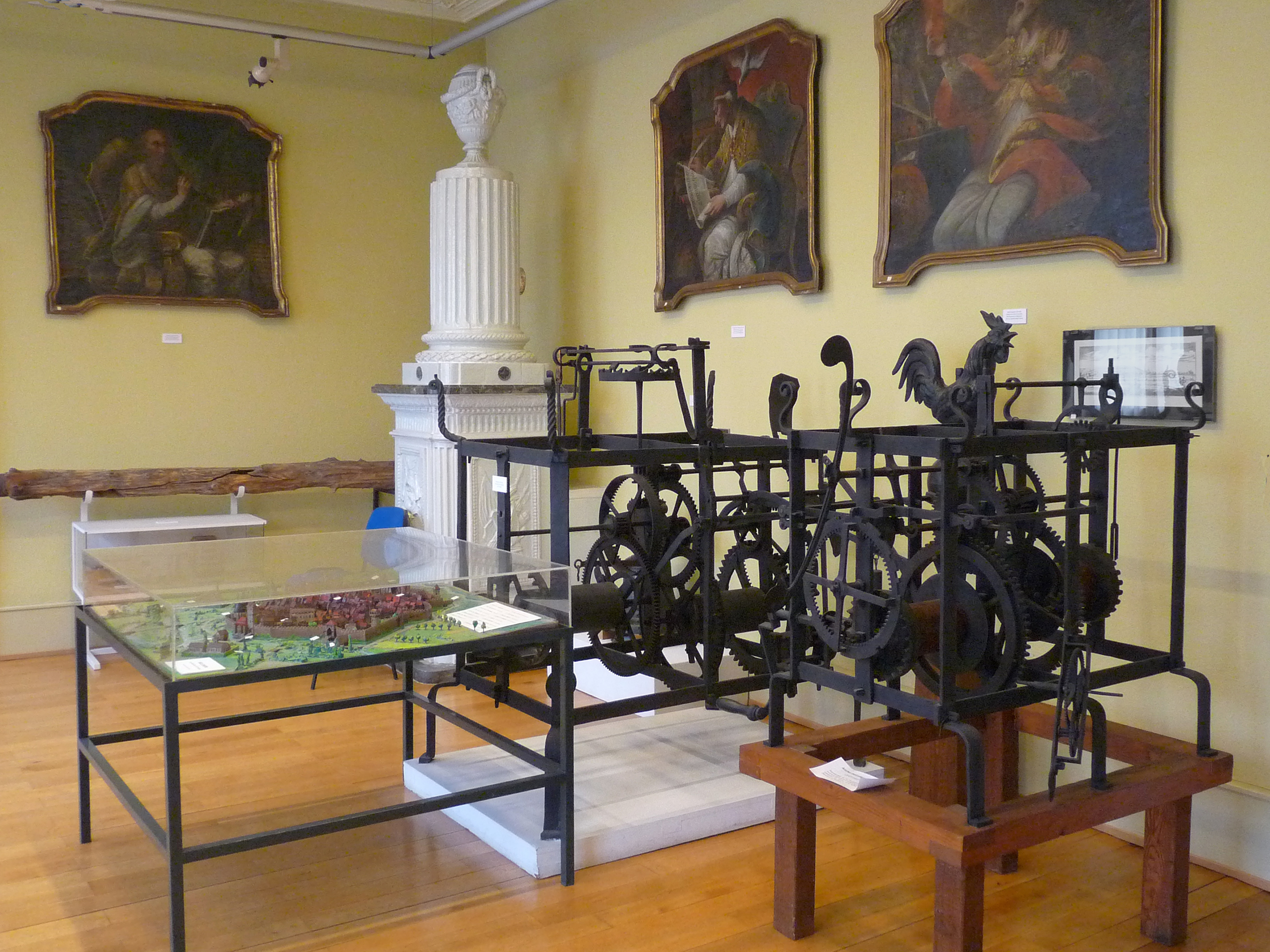
A former 18th-century room

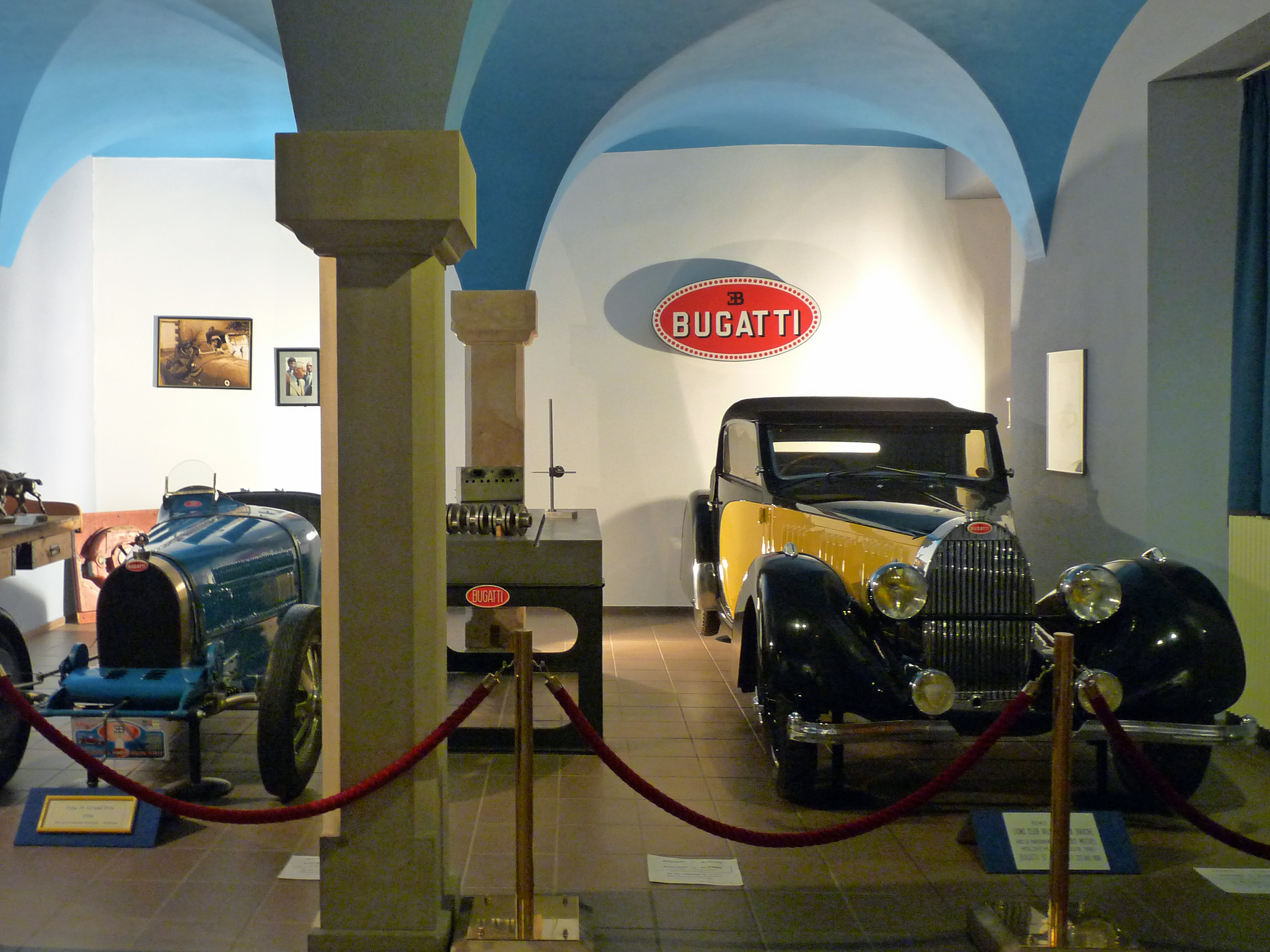
Bugatti automobiles in the Bugatti section
