= Dorlisheim =

Dorlisheim Dorelse
- Commune
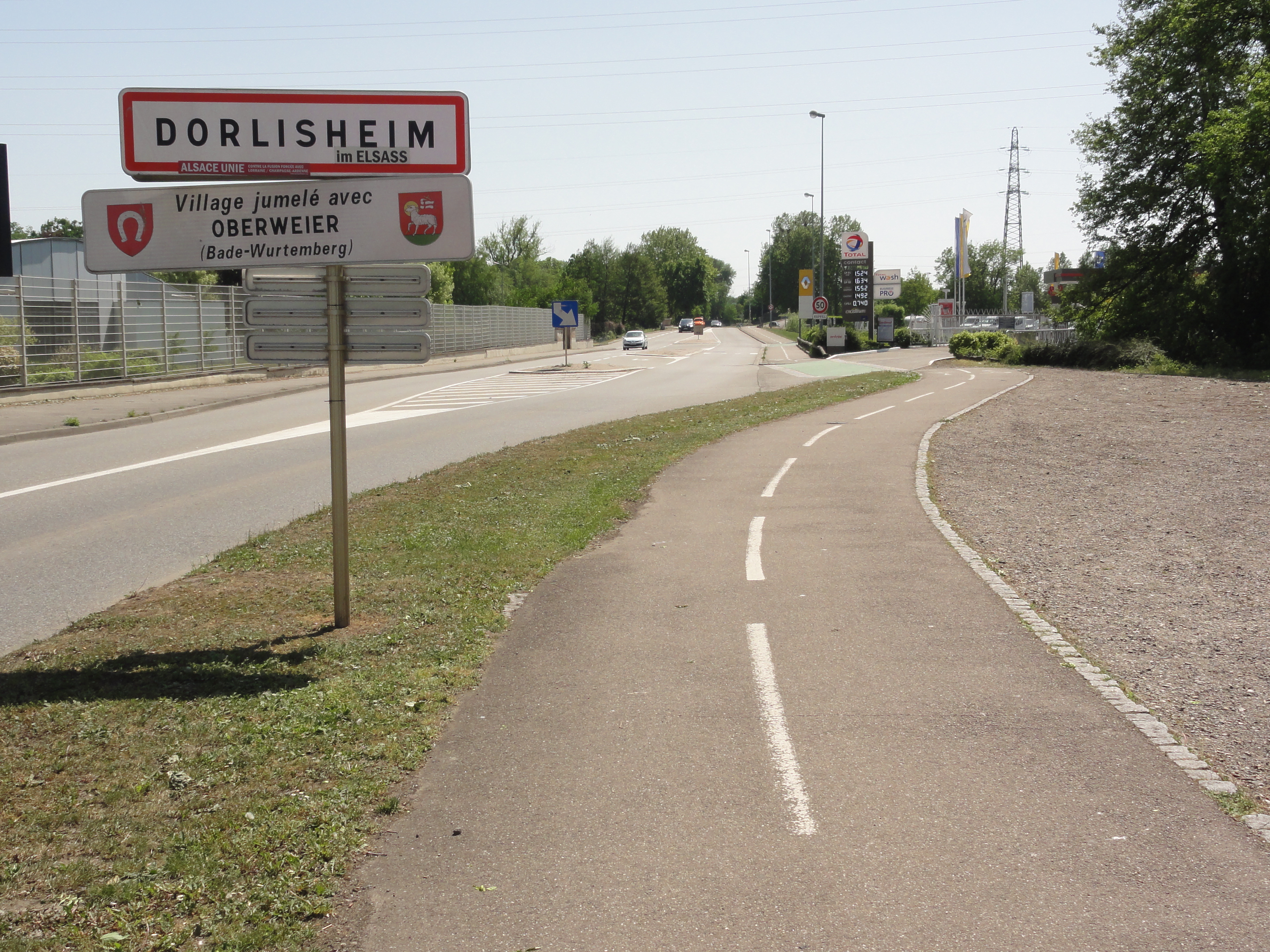
- The road into Dorlisheim

- Coat of arms
- Location of Dorlisheim
- Location within France Location within Grand Est
- Coordinates: 48°31′29″N 7°29′10″E
- Country: France
- Region: Grand Est
- Department: Bas-Rhin
- Arrondissement: Molsheim
- Canton: Molsheim

Government
  - Mayor (2020–2026): Gilbert Roth
- Area^{1}: 11.53 km^{2} (4.45 sq mi)
- Highest elevation: 373 m (1,224 ft)
- Lowest elevation: 172 m (564 ft)
- Population (2023): 2,636
  - Density: 228.6/km^{2} (592.1/sq mi)
- Time zone: UTC+01:00 (CET)
  - Summer (DST): UTC+02:00 (CEST)
- INSEE/Postal code: 67101 /67120
- ^{1} French Land Register data, which excludes lakes, ponds, glaciers > 1 km^{2} (0.386 sq mi or 247 acres) and river estuaries.

Dorlisheim (French pronunciation: [dɔʁlisaim]; Alsatian: Dorelse) is a commune in the Bas-Rhin department in Grand Est in north-eastern France.

== Population ==
Historical population
Year	Pop.	±% p.a.
1968	2,008	—
1975	2,078	+0.49%
1982	2,149	+0.48%
1990	2,128	−0.12%
1999	2,167	+0.20%
2007	2,408	+1.33%
2012	2,507	+0.81%
2017	2,647	+1.09%
2023	2,636	−0.07%
Source: INSEE

== Economy ==
The headquarters of Bugatti Automobiles is located at the Château Saint-Jean just outside Dorlisheim.

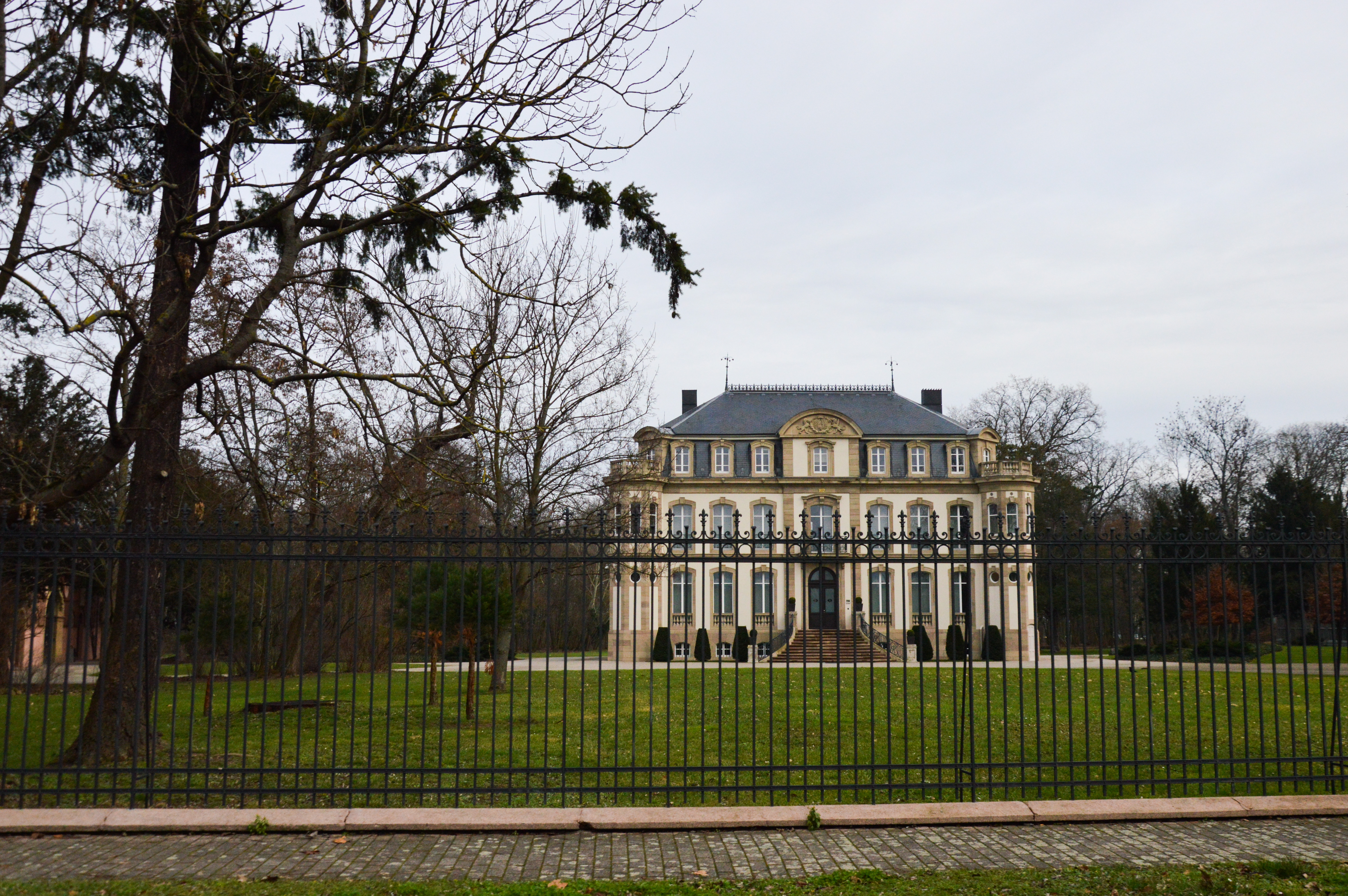
Château Saint-Jean

== See also ==
- Communes of the Bas-Rhin department
