= Bugatti straight-8 Grand Prix racing engine =

Bugatti straight-eight Grand Prix racing engine
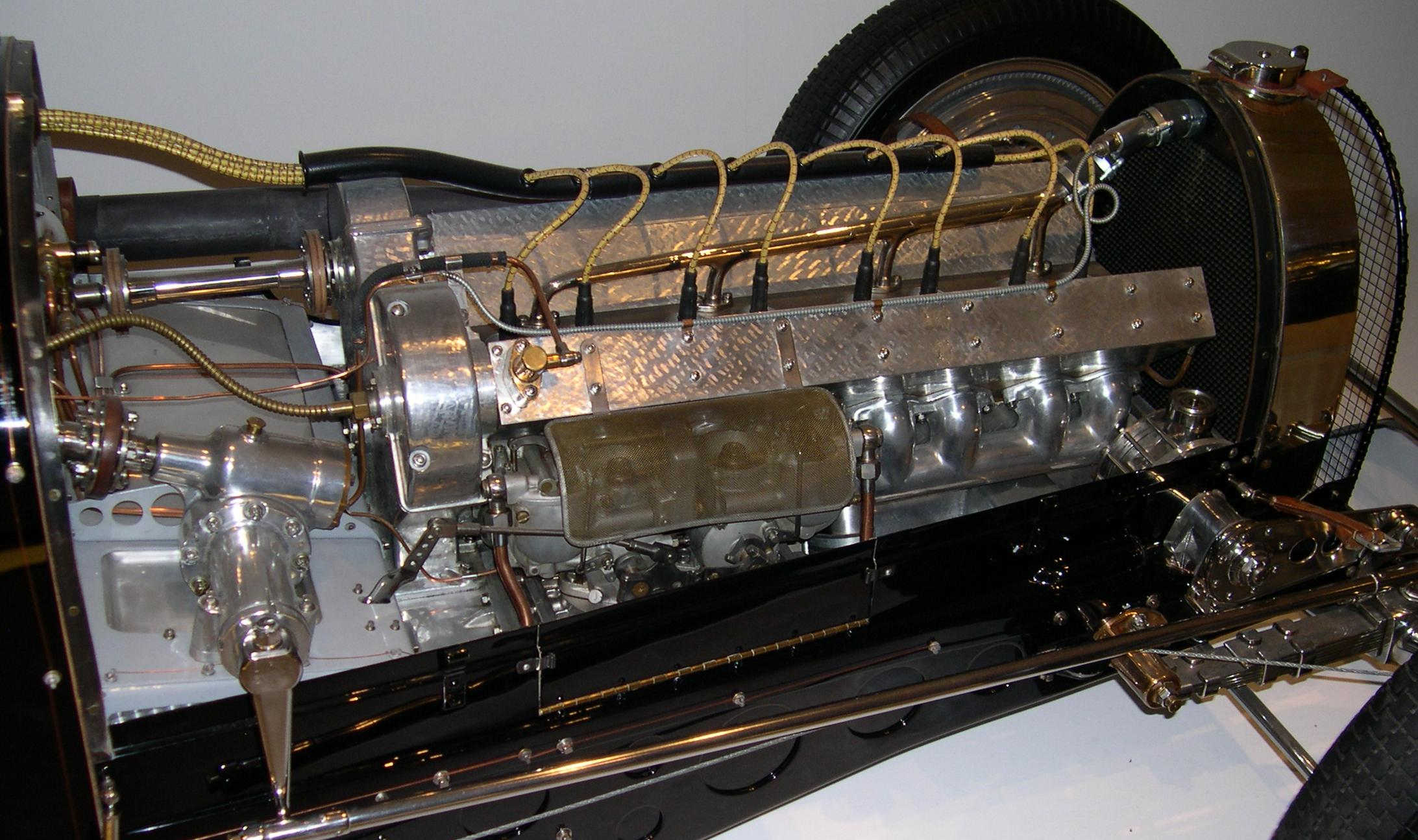

Overview
- Manufacturer: Bugatti
- Production: 1922-1956

Layout
- Configuration: L-8
- Displacement: 1.5–5.0 L (91.5–305.1 cu in)
- Valvetrain: 16-valve to 24-valve, SOHC/DOHC, two-valves per cylinder to three-valves per cylinder

Combustion
- Supercharger: Roots-type supercharger (1927-1939)
- Fuel system: Weber Carburetor
- Fuel type: Gasoline
- Oil system: Dry sump
- Cooling system: Water-cooled

Output
- Power output: 90–402 hp (67–300 kW; 91–408 PS)
- Torque output: 94.5–400 lb⋅ft (128–542 N⋅m)

Bugatti made a series of Grand Prix, and later Formula One, straight-8 racing engines; between 1922 and 1939, and once again in 1956.

== Background ==
Bugatti commonly used 16-valve to 24-valve, single-overhead and double-overhead cam, two-valve to four-valve per cylinder, straight-eight engines. Bugatti built numerous successful racing cars; with high-performance single-overhead, or dual-overhead-camshaft, straight-eight engines, in the 1920s and 1930s.

Ettore Bugatti experimented with straight-eight engines from 1922, and in 1924, he introduced the 2 L Bugatti Type 35, one of the most successful racing cars of all time, which eventually won over 1000 races. Like the Duesenbergs, Bugatti got his ideas from building aircraft engines during World War I, and like them, his engine was a high-revving overhead camshaft unit with three valves per cylinder. It produced 100 bhp (75 kW) at 5,000 rpm and could be revved to over 6,000 rpm. Nearly 400 of the Type 35 and its derivatives were produced, an all-time record for Grand Prix motor racing.

== Applications ==
- Bugatti T30
- Bugatti T32
- Bugatti T35B
- Bugatti T35C
- Bugatti T36
- Bugatti T39
- Bugatti T51
- Bugatti T53
- Bugatti T54
- Bugatti T59/50B
- Bugatti T251
