= Bugatti 8-cylinder line =

Bugatti Type 30
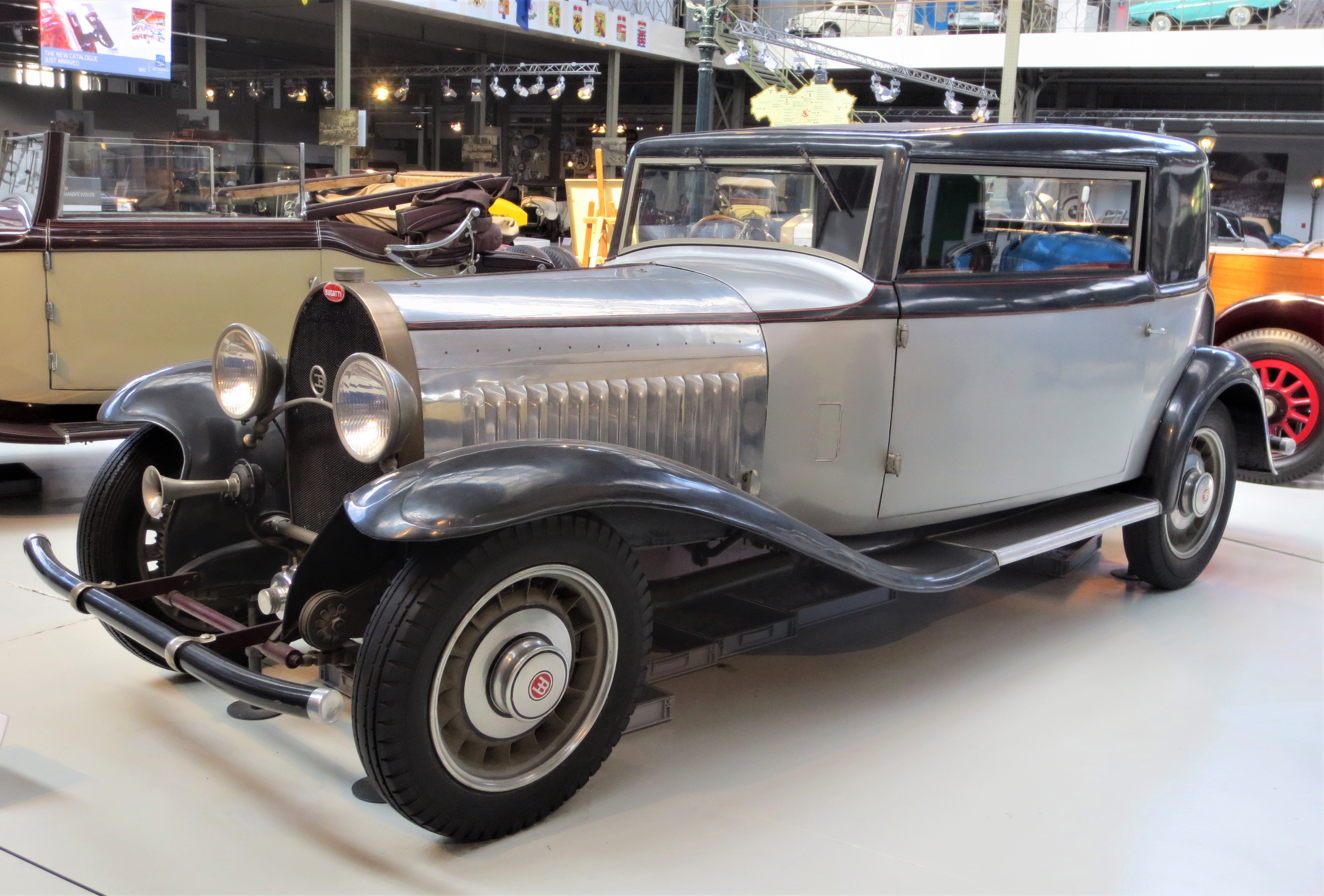
- 1930 Bugatti Type 49 coupé

Overview
- Manufacturer: Bugatti
- Also called: Type 38, 40, 43, 44, and 49
- Production: 1922–1934; 3,490 produced
- Assembly: France: Molsheim, Alsace (Usine Bugatti de Molsheim)

Body and chassis
- Class: Grand tourer

Powertrain
- Engine: 1,991 cc (121.5 cu in) I8 (Type 30 and 38); 1,496 cc (91.3 cu in) I8 (Type 40); 1,627 cc (99.3 cu in) I8 (Type 40A); 2,262 cc (138.0 cu in) I8 (Type 43); 2,991 cc (182.5 cu in) I8 (Type 44); 3,257 cc (198.8 cu in) I8 (Type 49)

Chronology
- Successor: Bugatti Type 57

The early Bugatti 8-cylinder line began with the 1922 Type 30. The same basic design was used for the 1926 Type 38 as well as the Type 40, Type 43, Type 44, and Type 49.

== Type 30 ==
Produced from 1922 through 1926, the Type 30 used the 2 L (1991 cc/121 in³) engine of the Type 29 racer. Its chassis components were similar to the Type 13 "Brescia" and a few such as the gearbox were shared with the later modified type "Brescia". This engine went on to be used in the cut-cost Type 35A and Type 38. About 600 were built from late 1922 through 1926 in varying specifications.

== Type 38 ==
The Type 38 was produced in 1926 and 1927. It used the 2 L (1991 cc/121 in³) engine from the Type 35A "Tecla". The supercharger from the Type 37A was later fitted, making the Type 38A. Its gearbox and brakes were later used in the Type 40, while its radiator and axles were shared with the Type 43.

385 examples were produced, 39 of which were supercharged 38As.

== Type 40 ==
The Type 40, introduced in 1926 and produced through 1930, used the 3-valve 1.5 L (1496 cc/91 in³) engine first used in some Type 37s. It was an enclosed tourer or (as the Type 40A) small roadster. About 830 were built.

The Type 40A shared its block with the Type 40 and displaced 1.6 L (1627 cc/99 in³). All 40 Type 40As were built in 1930.

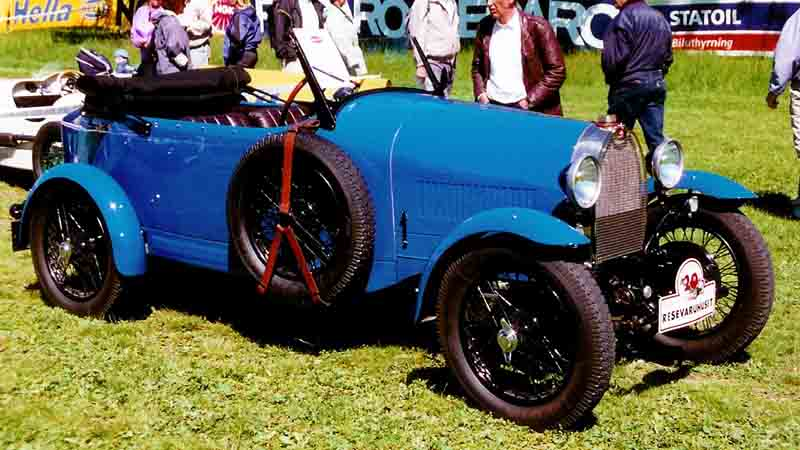
1929 Bugatti Type 40 Grand Sport Tourer

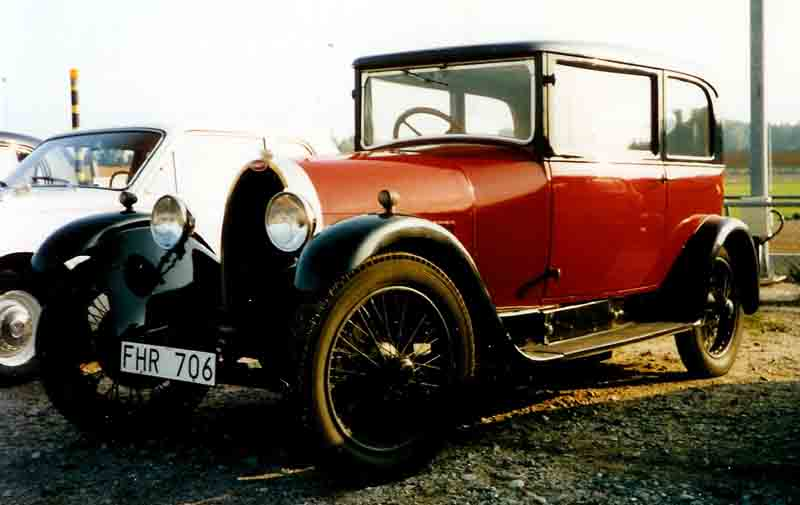
1927 Bugatti Type 40

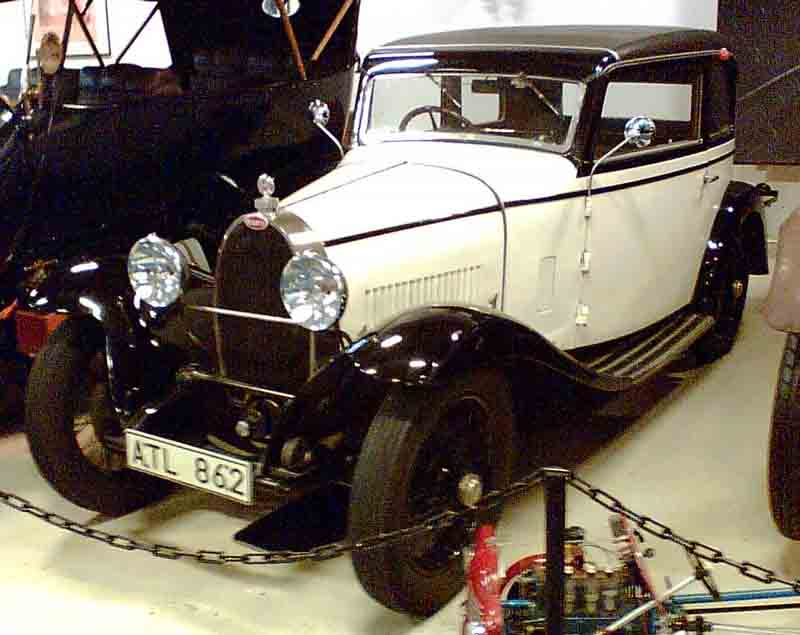
1929 Bugatti Type 40

== Type 43 ==
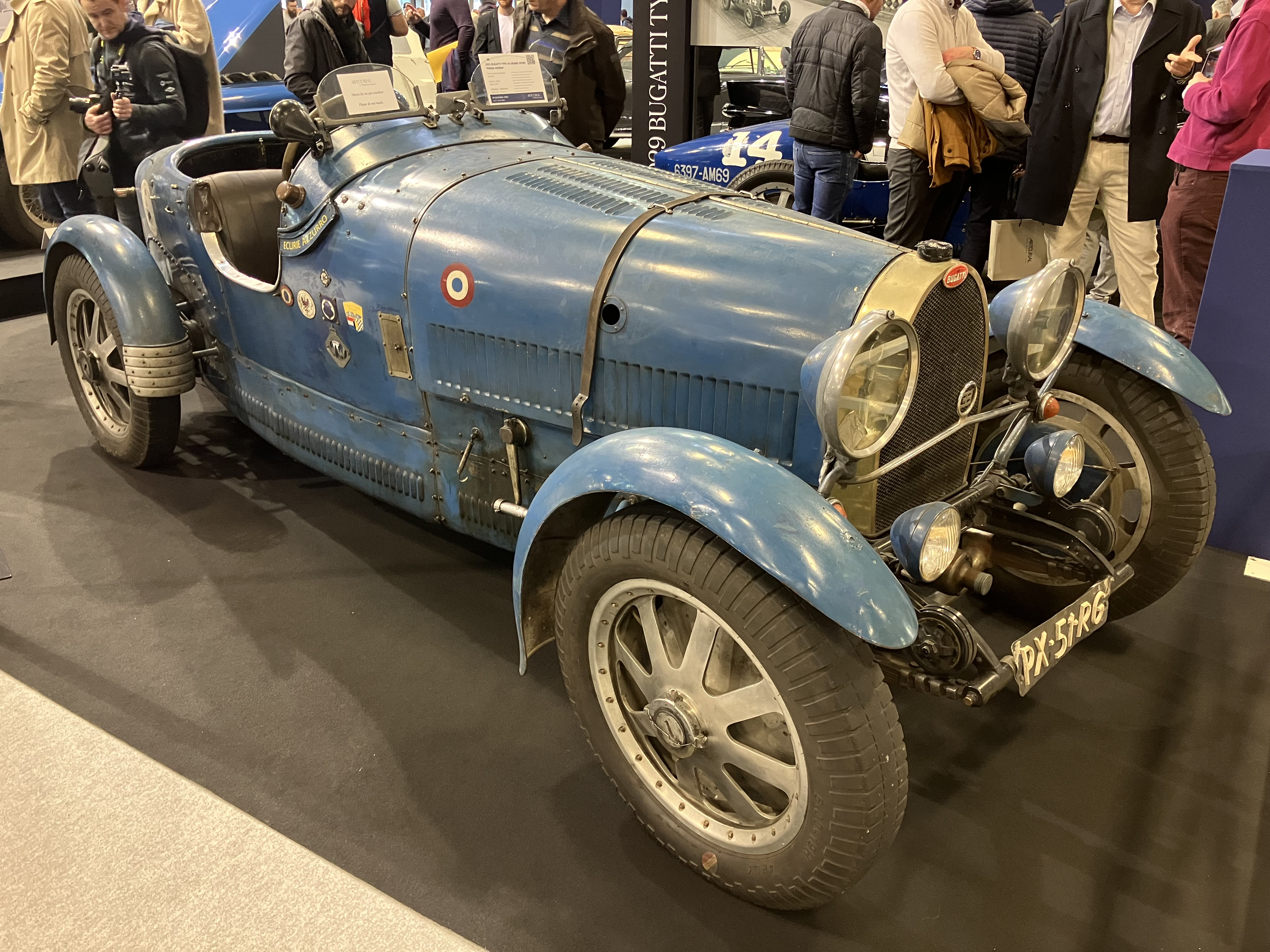
1931 Bugatti Type 43 Grand Sport

Another evolution of the basic 8 platform, the Type 43 borrowed the supercharged 2.3 L (2262 cc/138 in³) engine from the Type 35B and combined it with the basic chassis of the Type 38. The engine produced about 120 hp (89 kW), bringing the little car to 60 mph (97 km/h) in less than 12 seconds.

The Type 43 was noted at the time as the world's first 100 mph (160 km/h) production car — in fact, it could reach nearly 112 mph (180 km/h) when most fast cars could only reach 70 mph (110 km/h). 160 of these "Grand Sport" cars were made from 1927 through 1931, with a Type 43A roadster appearing that year and lasting through 1932.

== Type 44 ==
The Type 44 was the widest-production variant of this range, with 1,095 known. A larger and sometimes enclosed tourer, it used a new 3-valve SOHC 3 L (2991 cc/182 in³) engine derived from the Type 43's unit. It was built from late 1927 through 1930.

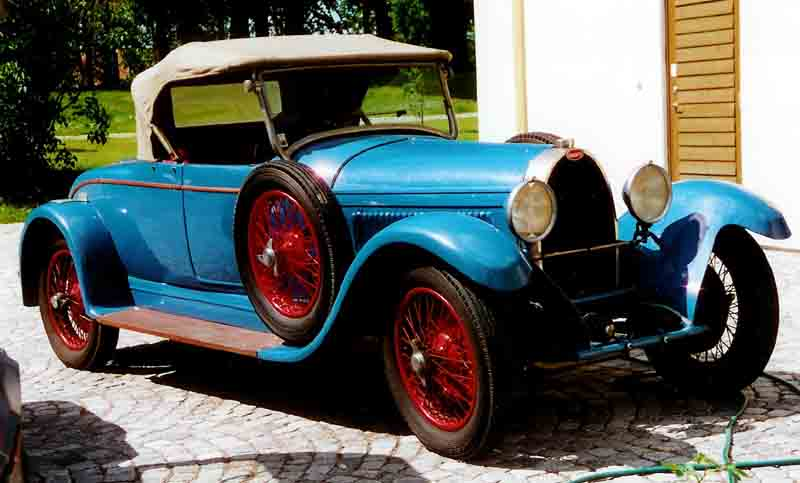
1927 Bugatti Type 44 Roadster

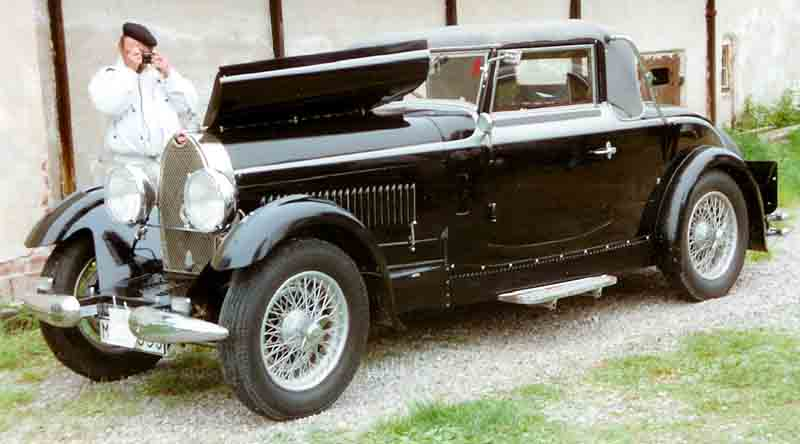
1928 Bugatti Type 44 Cabriolet

== Type 49 ==
The Bugatti Type 49 was an improved Type 44 with a slightly bigger engine with double ignition and a cooling fan. Aluminium wheels were optional. A large proportion was originally supplied with enclosed bodywork but few remain in this form today as many have been re-bodied in a more sporting form. Produced from 1930 through 1934, about 470 examples were built. The Type 49 was the last of the early 8-cylinder single cam Bugatti line which began with the Type 30, though its gearbox would later be reused on the Type 55.

The Type 49 featured a straight-8 engine of 3.3 L (3257 cc/198 in³) displacement. Bore and stroke were 72 mm by 100 mm and three valves per cylinder were used with a single overhead camshaft.
