= List of Bugatti prototypes =

This is a list of prototype vehicles created by Bugatti that never reached or were never intended for serial production.

== Type 28 ==
The Type 28 road car. Launched in 1921 and unveiled at the Paris salon in 1922 this 8 cylinder prototype was the first Bugatti to feature what became the classic Bugatti rectilinear cylinder block and cambox design. It included many other novel features which never made it to production. The sole example manufactured is on display at the Musee National de lAutomobile in Mulhouse.

== Type 29 ==
The Type 29 racing car, which began development in 1921, used a new 2 L (1991 cc/121 in³) straight-8 engine which would subsequently be used in the Type 30 production model. Four of the cars were entered in the 1922 French Grand Prix where they performed well, with three of the four completing the full distance behind the sole other surviving car, a FIAT, from an original field of 18 cars.

== Type 36 ==
The Type 36 racer was produced in 1925, and used a 1.5 L (92 cu in) straight-8 engine adapted from earlier designs. With a 60 mm × 66 mm (2.4 in × 2.6 in) bore and stroke, the engine later saw use in the Type 39A. The Type 36 was built to compete at the banked oval race track at Montlhery just south of Paris. Despite Ettore Bugatti himself driving one of the T36 cars from Molsheim to Montlhery to compete they were withdrawn after practice and did not race due to their poor handling.The T36 initially had no rear suspension and only very limited front suspension travel, the rear axle being bolted directly to the frame without springs. In 1926, Bugatti added both rear springs, increased front suspension travel and a supercharger to the Type 36. This was the experimental base for the supercharged Type 35C.

== Type 45 and Type 47 ==
The Type 45 racing car's U16 engine was made up of 2 parallel 8-cylinder banks, hence the 8 exhaust runners per side, and had two crankshafts. The Type 45 (from 1934) and similar Type 47 "Grand Sport" were to become a new generation of cars from Bugatti. The engine, a 3-valve SOHC design, was based on the 3-valve straight-8 from the Type 35. Two versions were made: a 3.0 L (180 cu in) version fitted to a Type 47 prototype shared the Type 36's cylinder dimensions, while the Type 45 prototype used a stroke of 84 mm (3.3 in) for a displacement of 3.8 L (230 cu in). Output would have been 200 to 250 hp (150 to 190 kW) with a Roots-type supercharger.

The entire vehicle was unique, including its chassis. The Type 45 used a 2,600 mm (100 in) wheelbase, while the Type 47 was stretched to 2,750 mm (108 in). Both had a 1,250 mm (49 in) track.

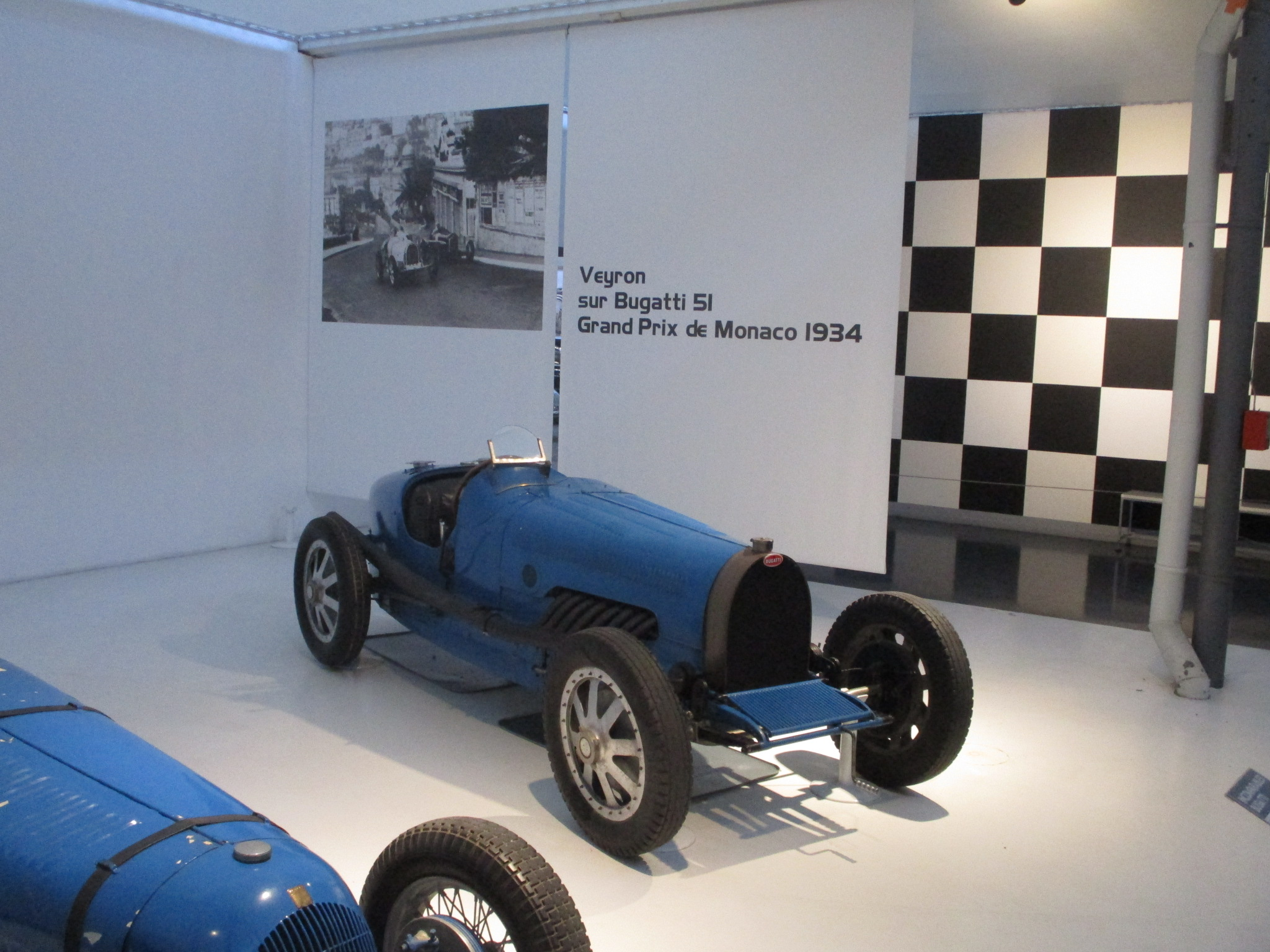
Type 45 front right

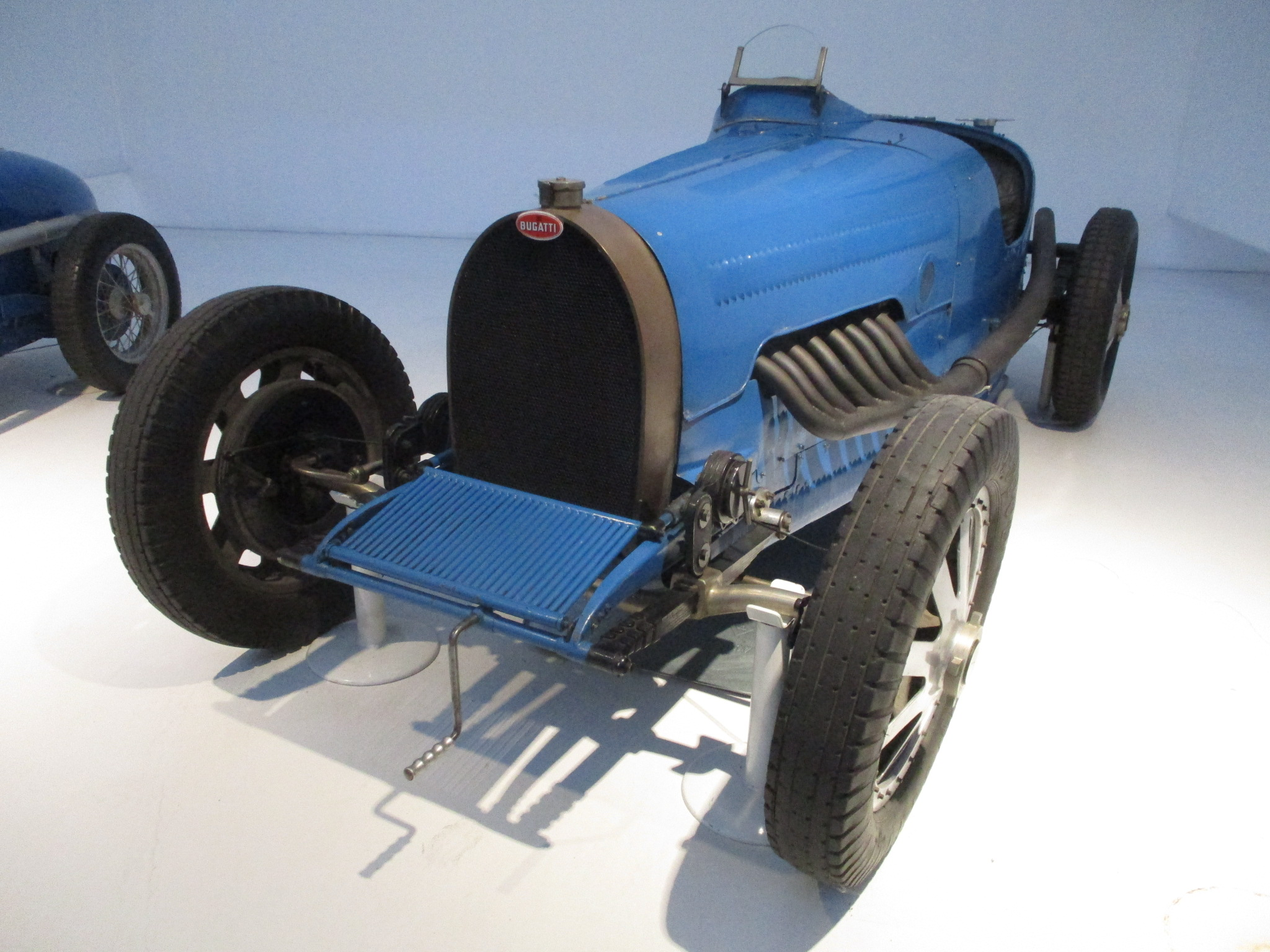
Type 45 front

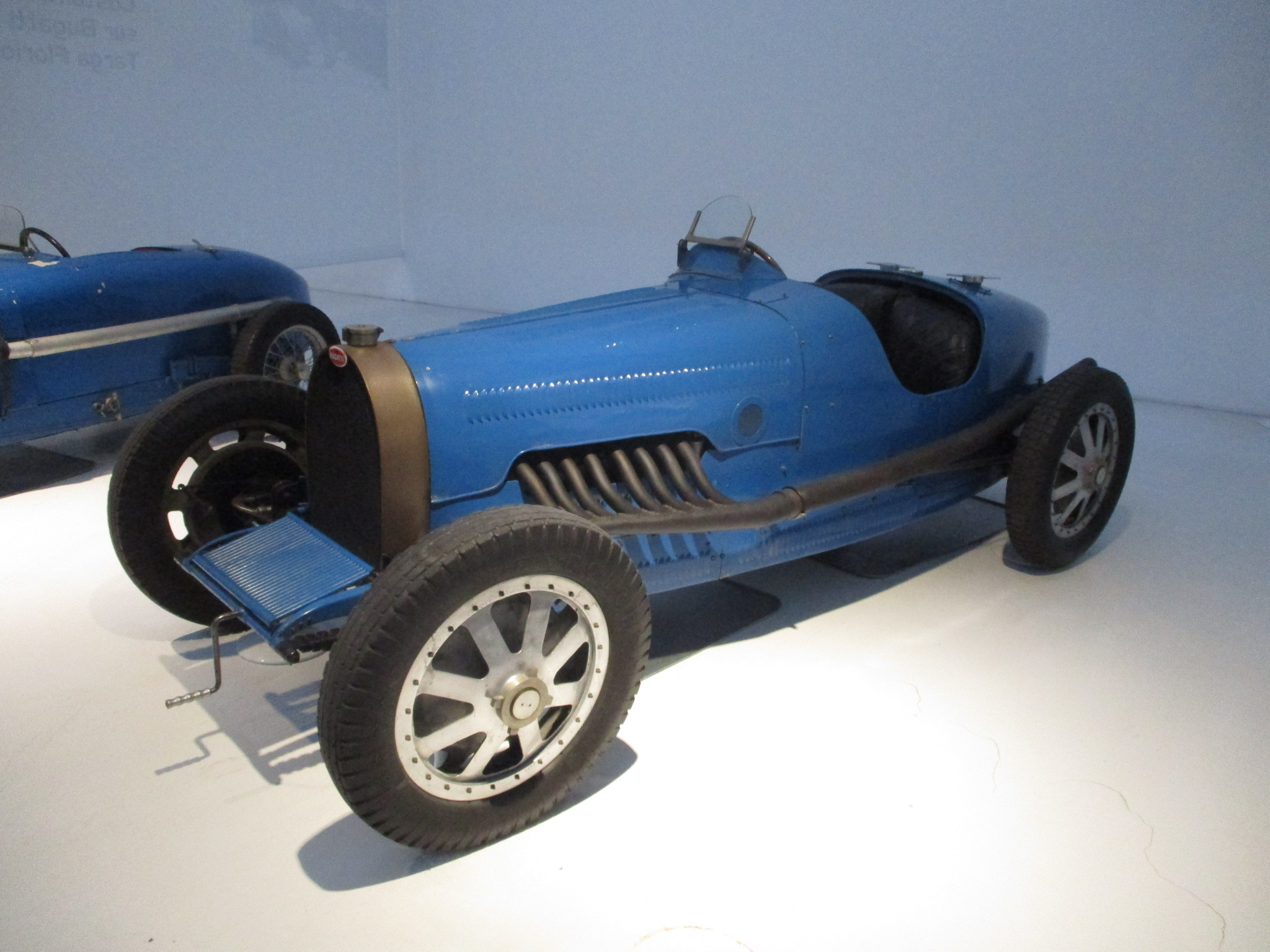
Type 45 front left

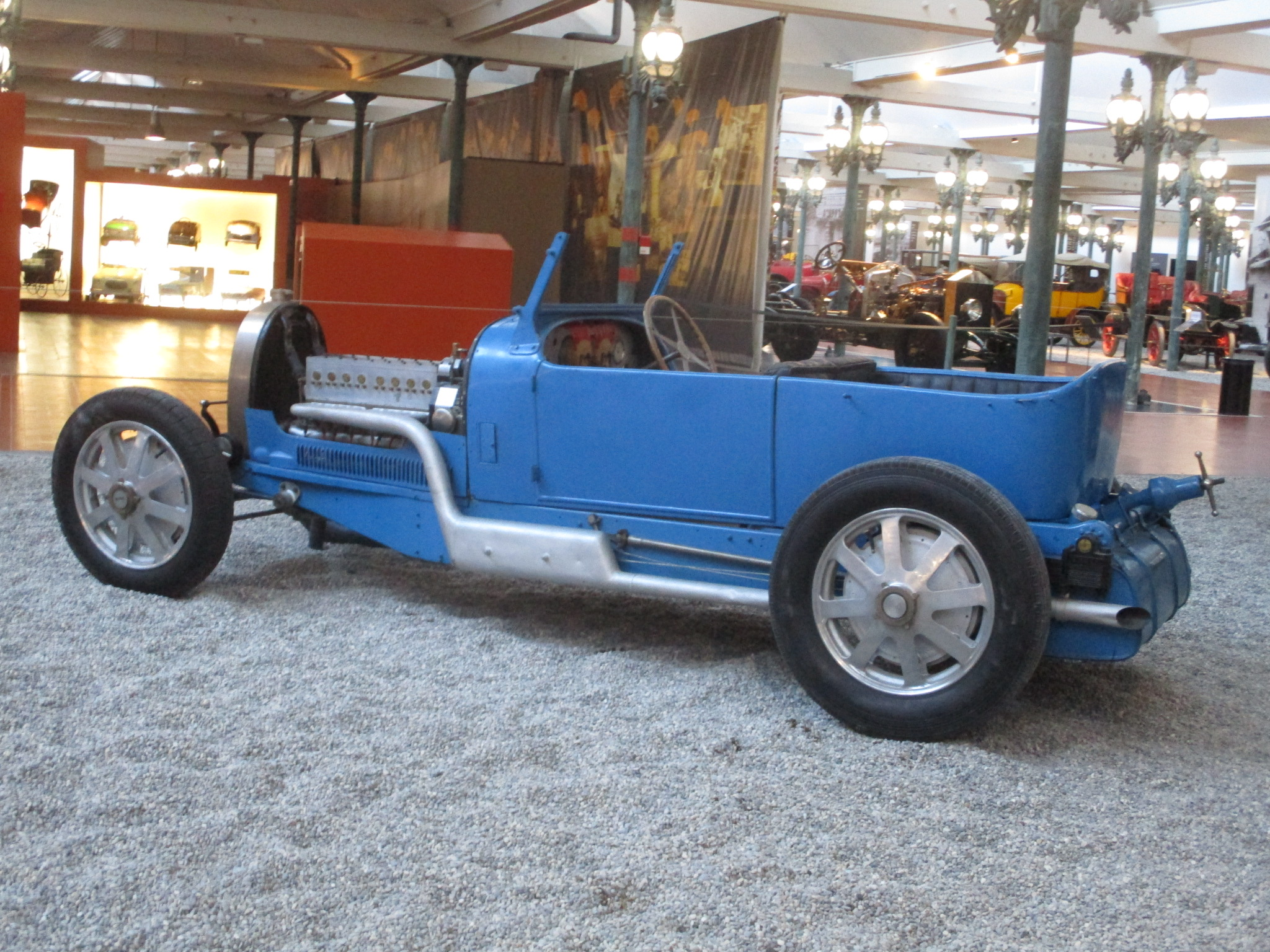
Type 47 left

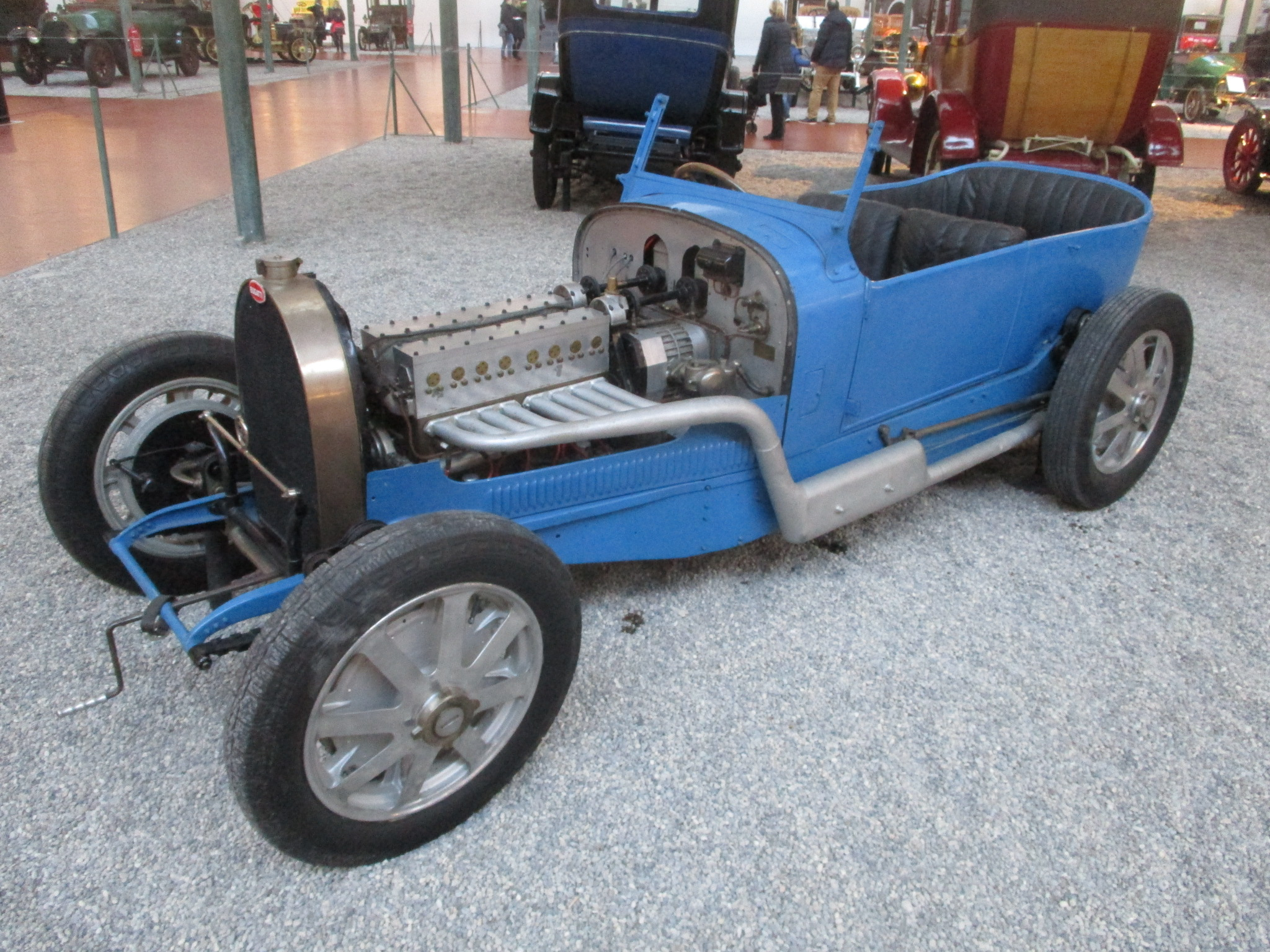
Type 47 front left

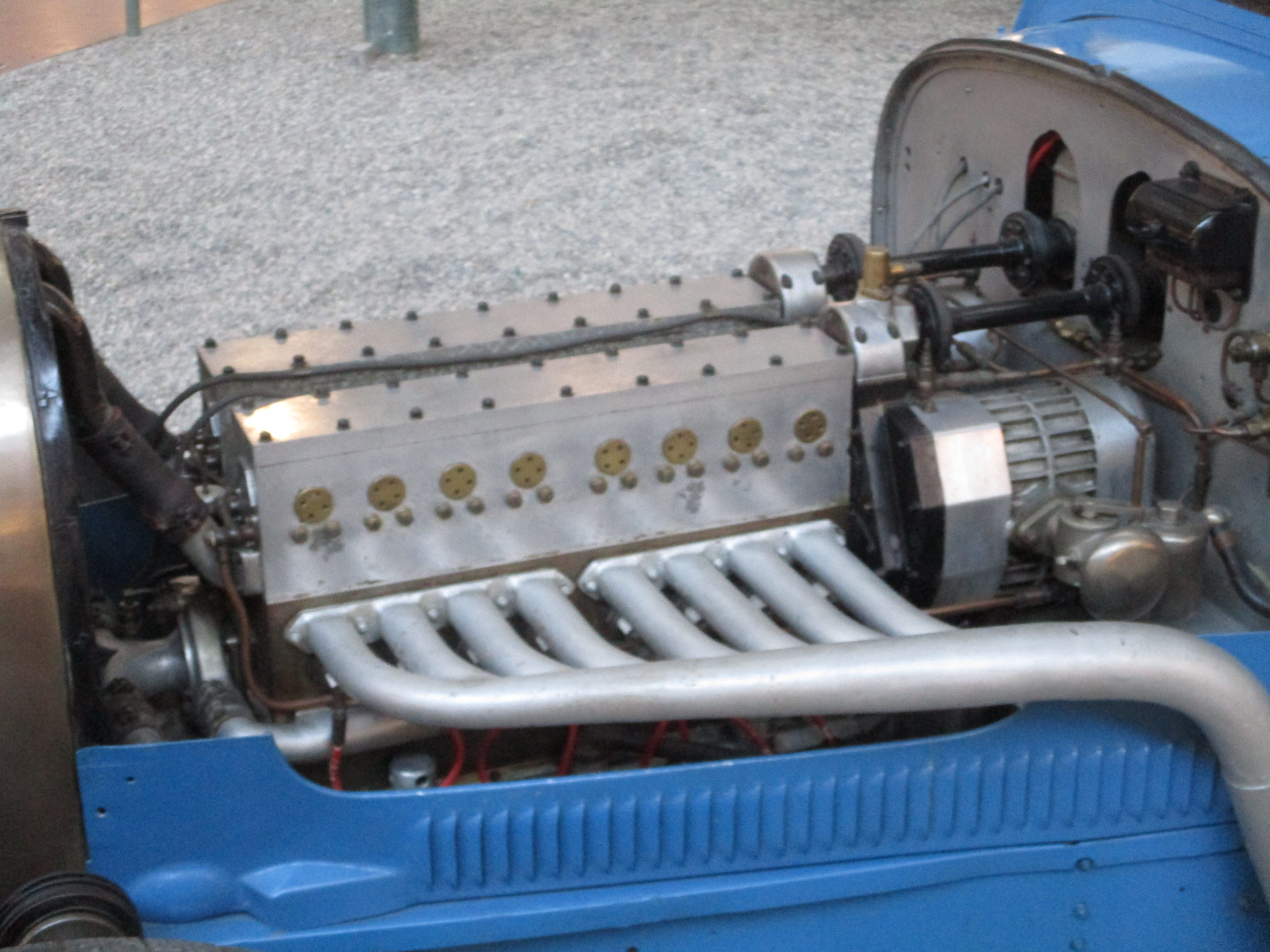
Type 47 engine left

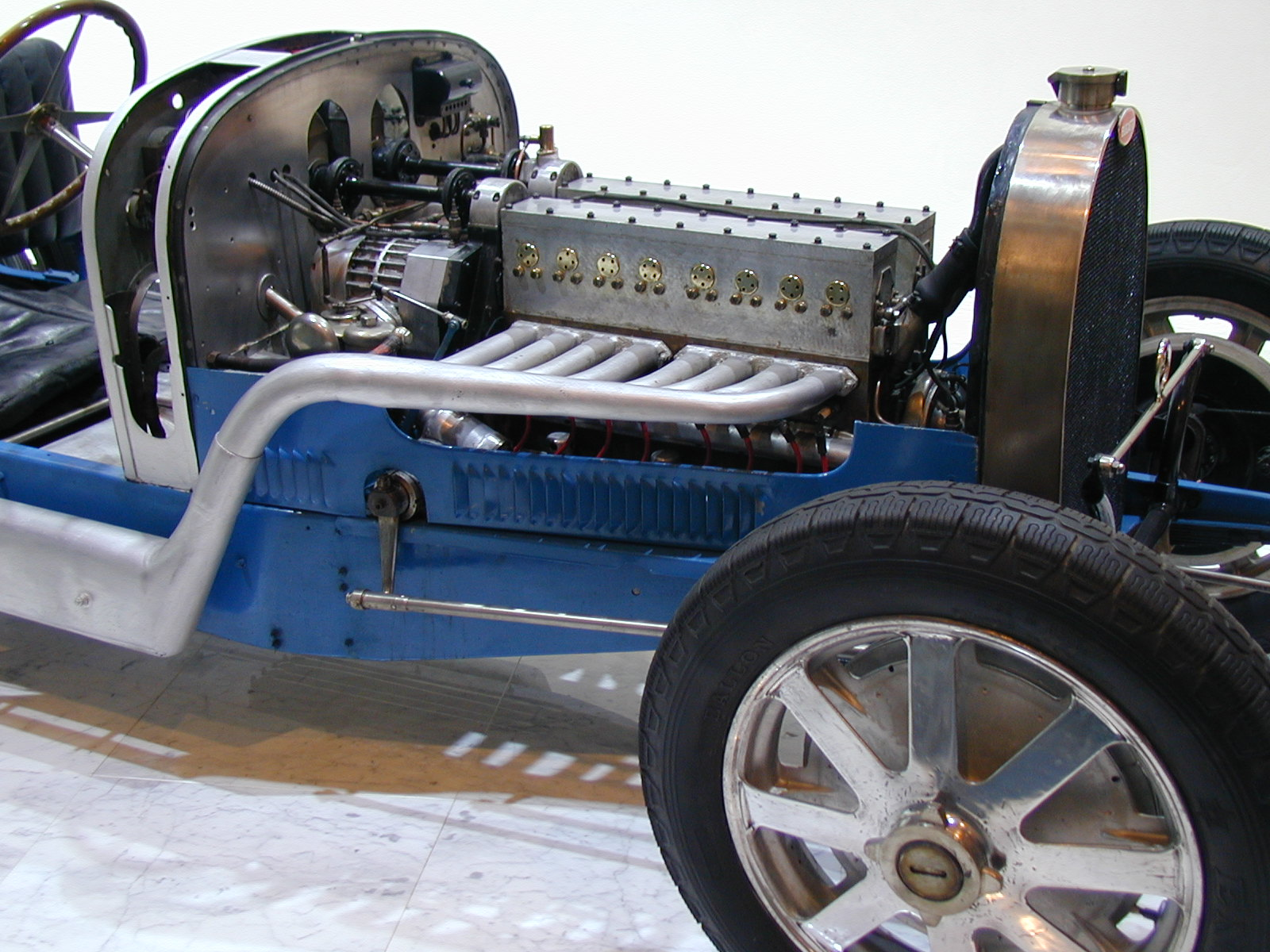
Type 47 engine right

== Type 56 ==
The Type 56 was an electric vehicle. Originally designed for private use by Ettore Bugatti as a factory runabout, popular demand from previous customers convinced him to build more examples. The number built is controversial; six seems the most likely answer.

The Type 56 was a tiny 2-seat open car very much in the style of turn-of-the-century horseless carriages or voiturettes. Power came from a single 28 amp electric motor producing 1 hp (0.75 kW). Energy was stored in six 6 volt accumulators in series for a total of 36 volts. The motor was mounted directly to the frame and drove the rear wheels through gears. Electric braking was integrated, and both hand- and foot-brakes operated on rear wheel drums. Four forward speeds were available, and the vehicle could accelerate to 28 km/h (17.4 mph). Steering was via a tiller.

Ettore Bugatti's personal Type 56 is part of the collection at the Musée National de l'Automobile de Mulhouse.

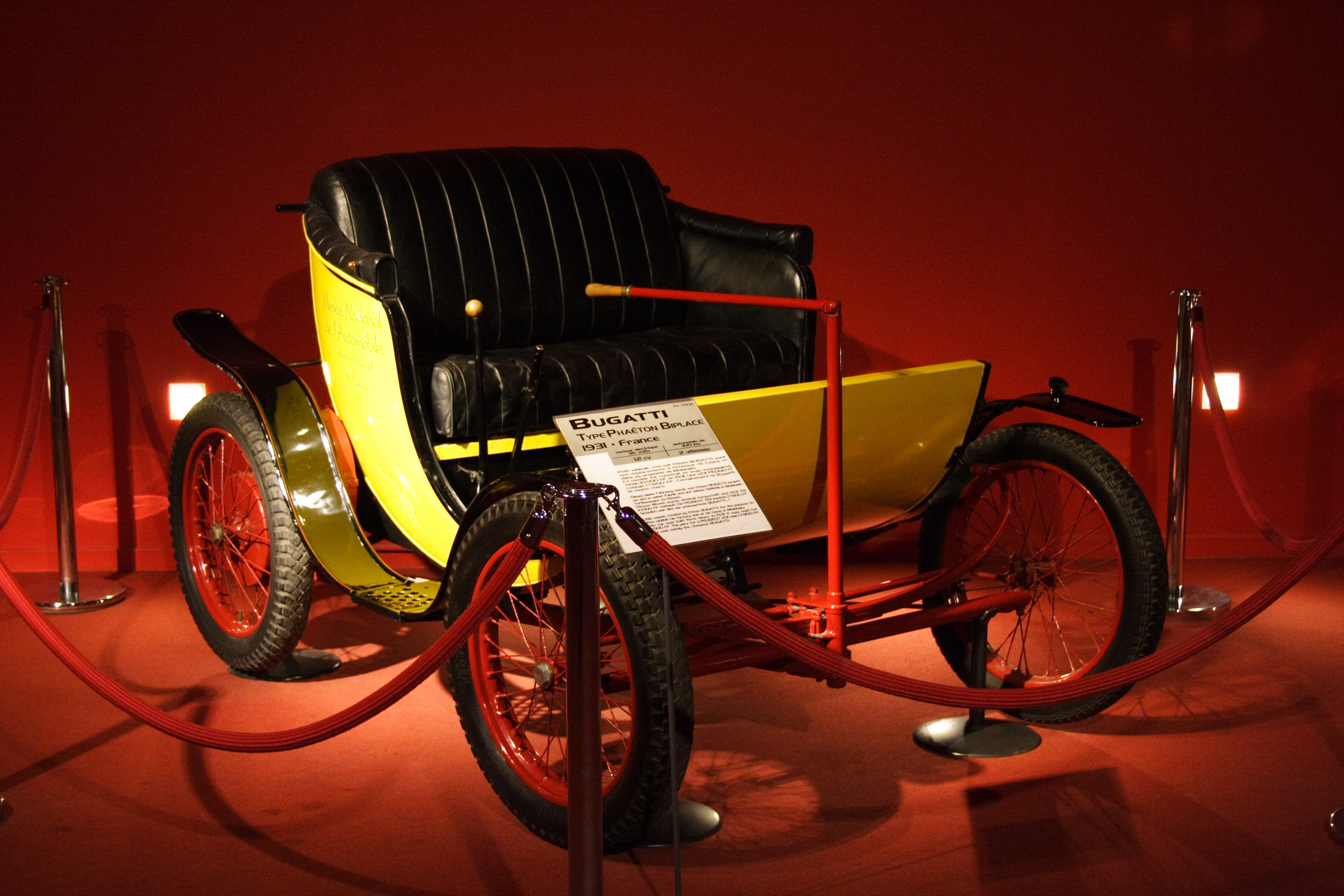
Type 56 front right

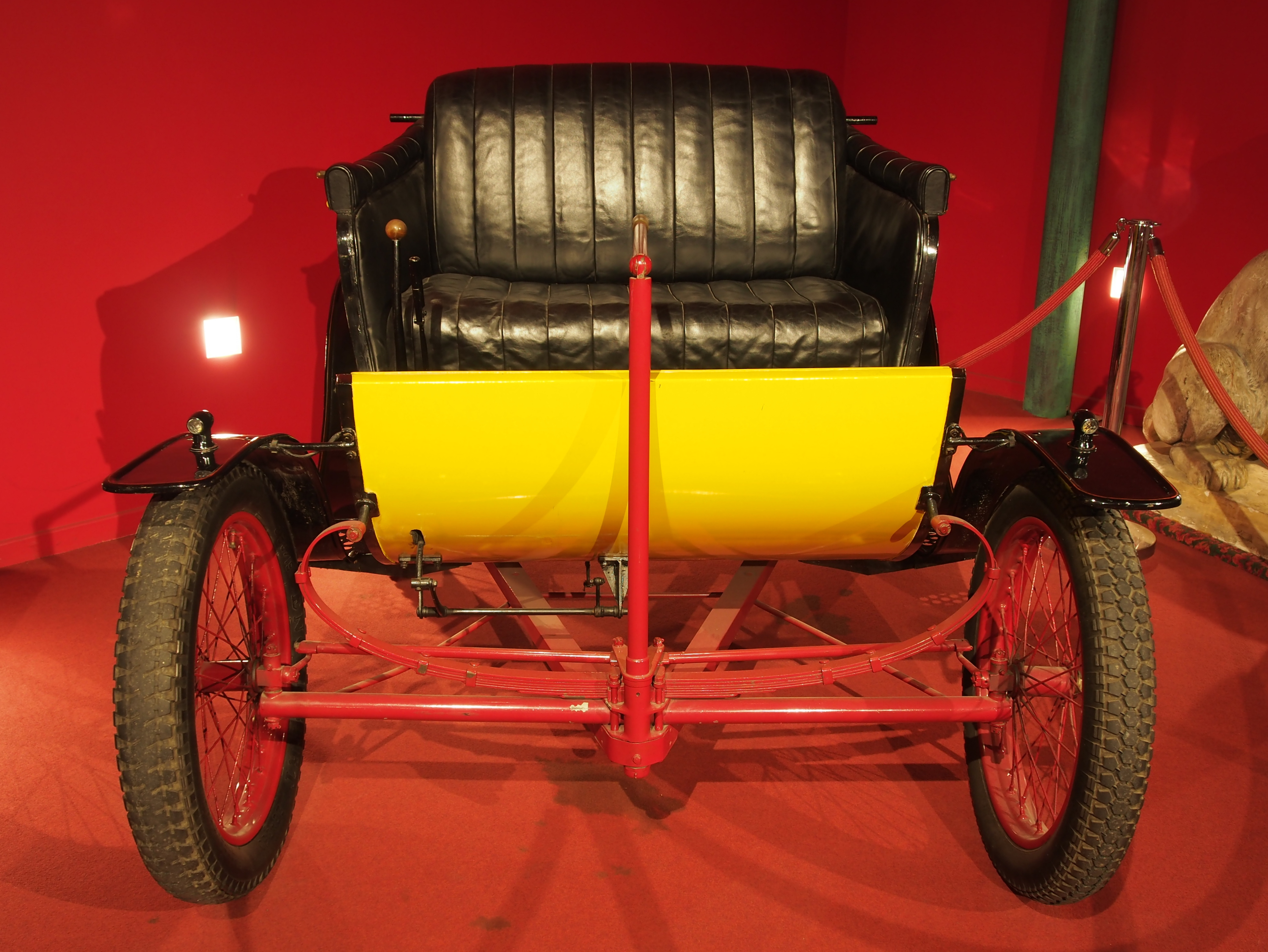
Type 56 front

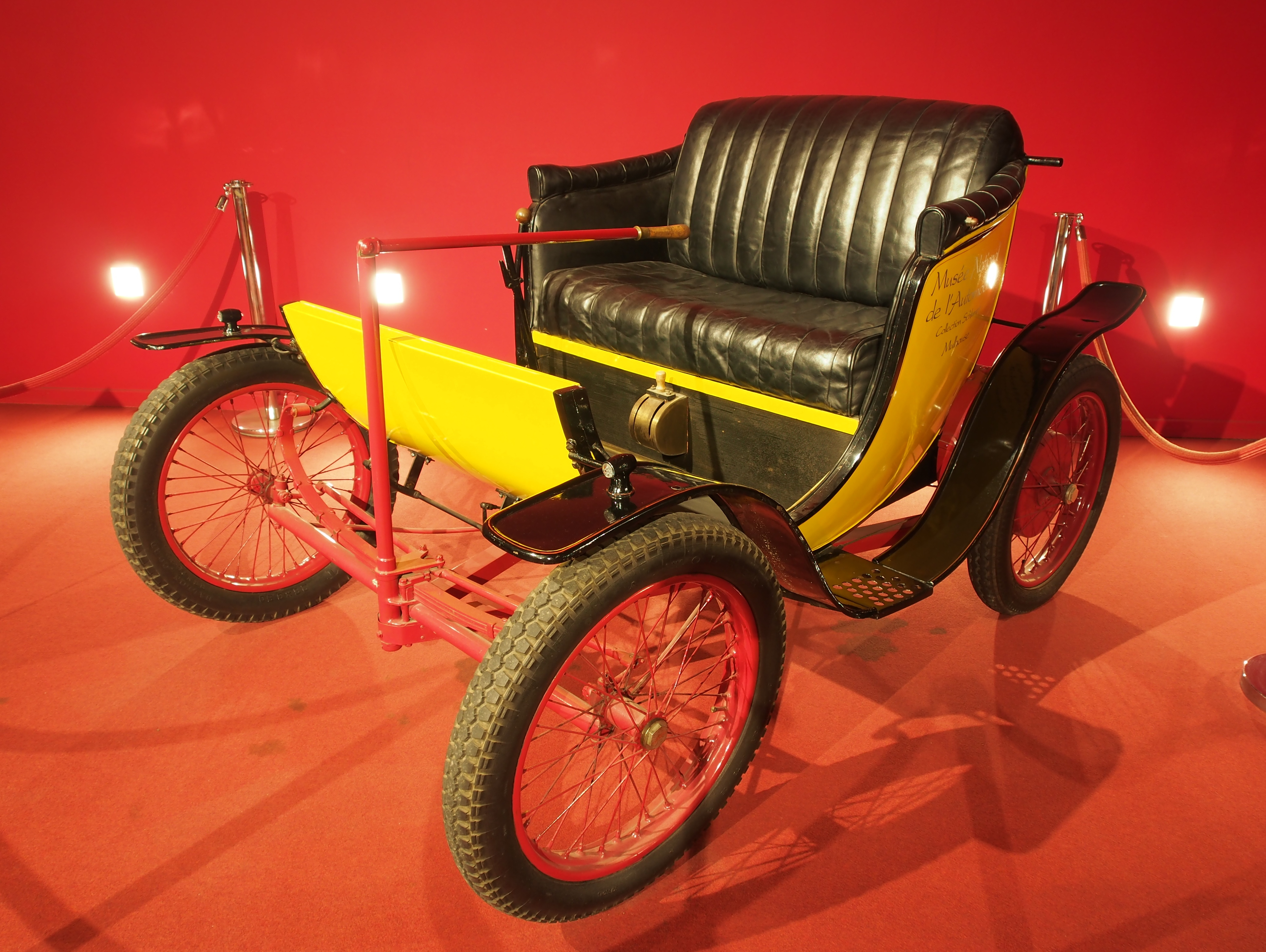
Type 56 front left

== Type 64 ==
The Type 64 was an Atlantic-style coupe produced in 1939 with papillon [French for "butterfly"] doors, designed by Jean Bugatti. It was fitted with a 4.4 L (270 cu in) 2-valve DOHC straight-8 engine and rode on a 3,300 mm (130 in) wheelbase. Production was begun on three cars, but only one body was finished before Jean Bugatti's death in 1939; a second was completed in 2012.

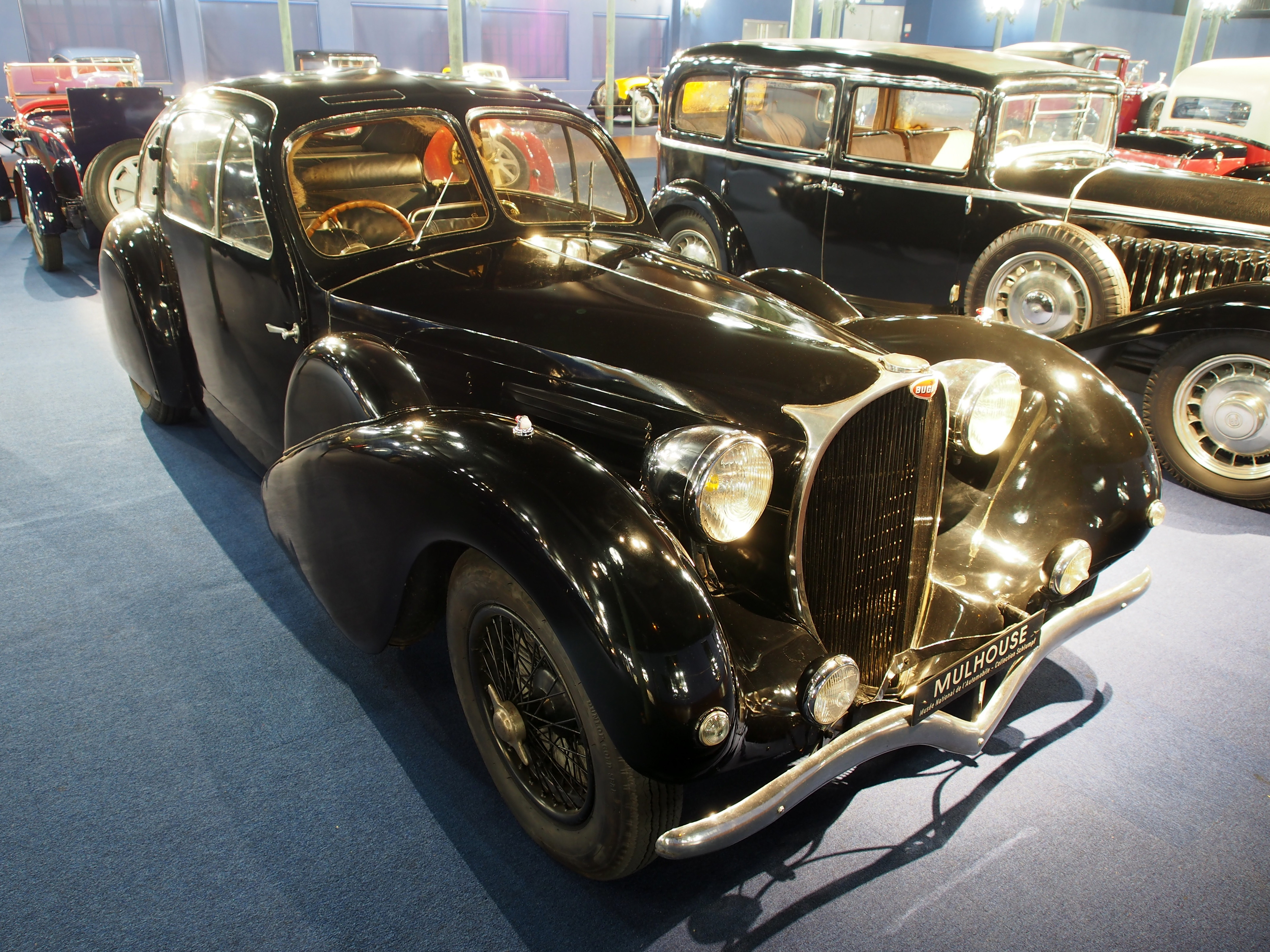
Type 64 front right

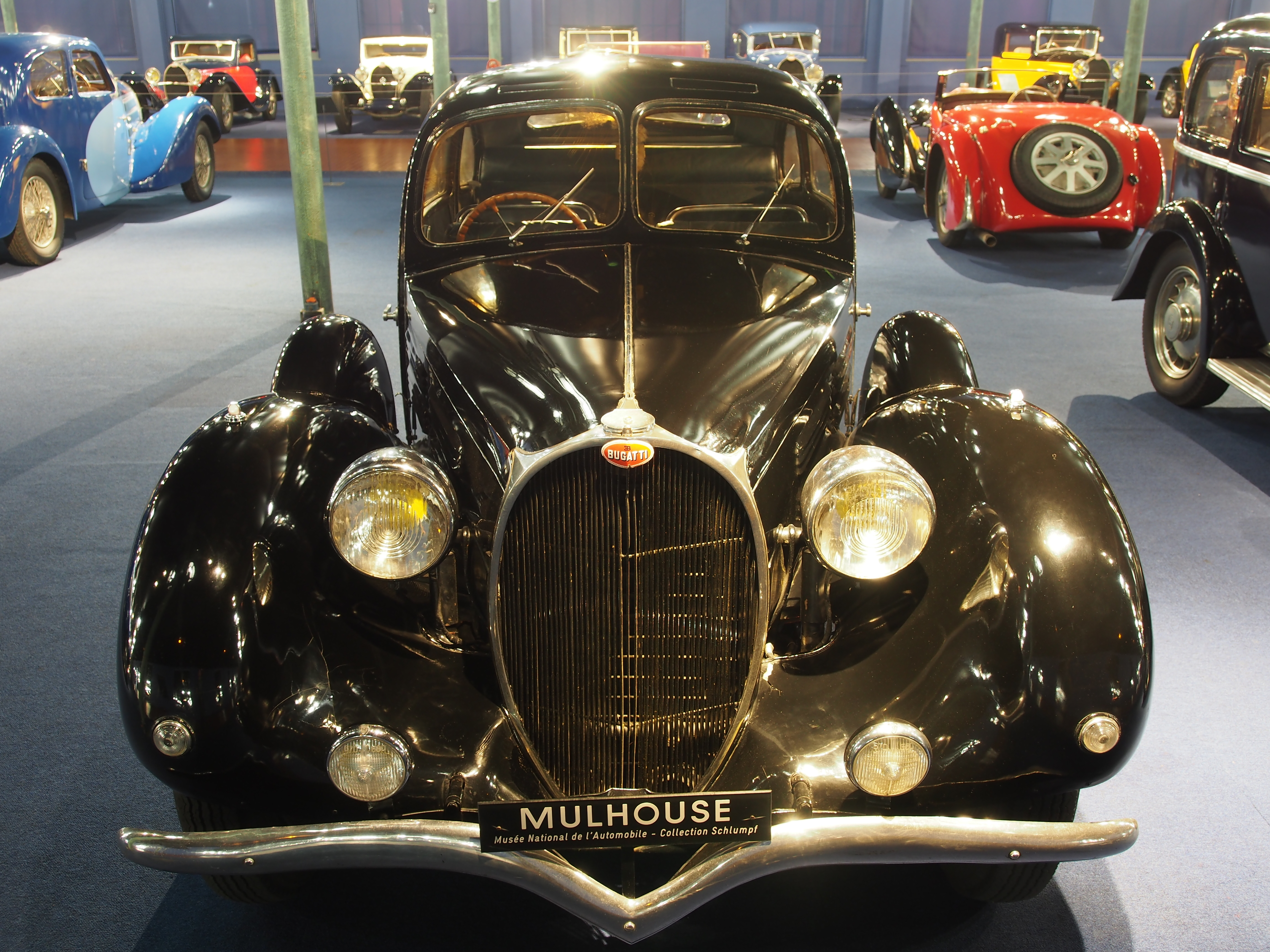
Type 64 front

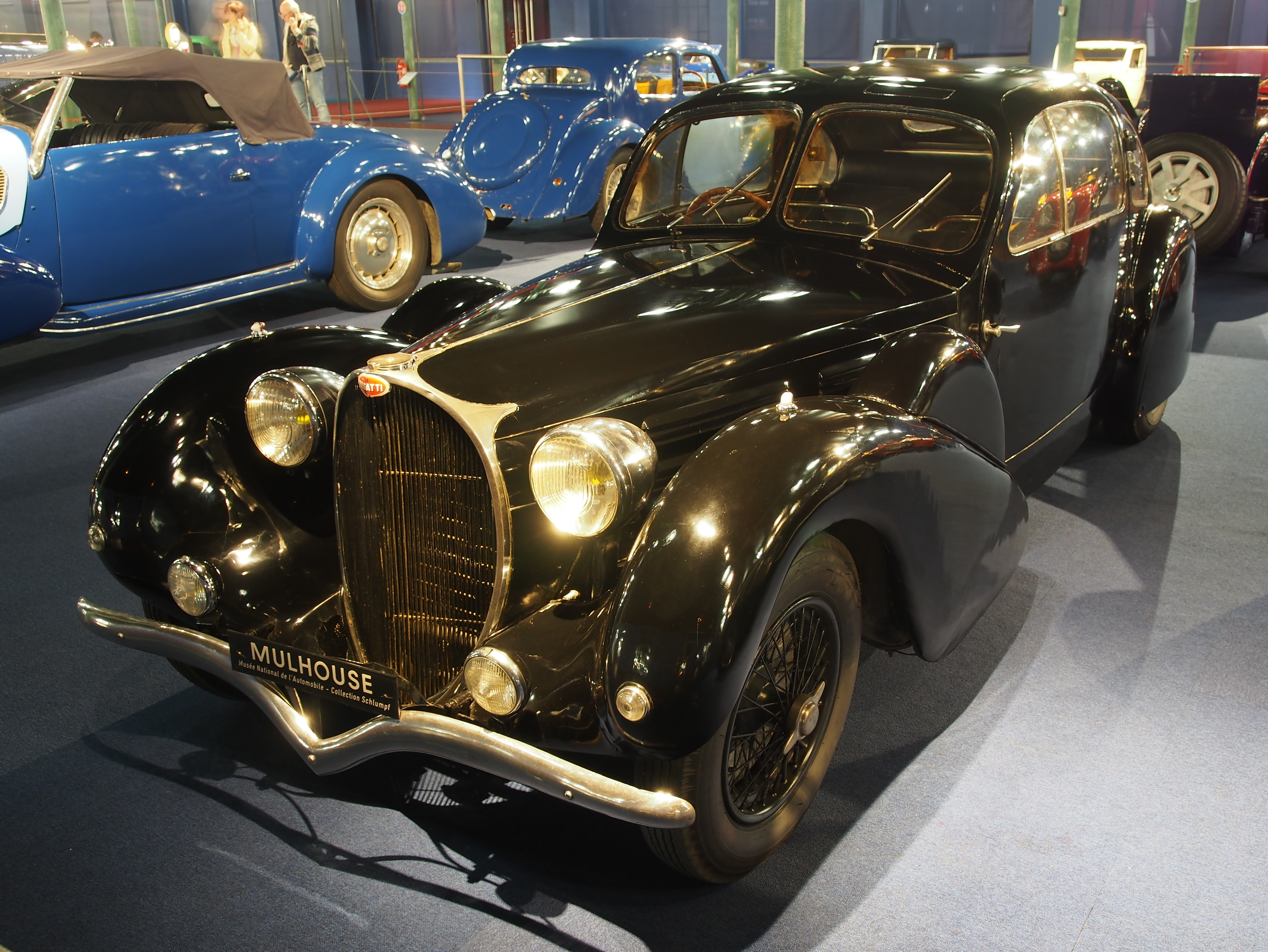
Type 64 front left

== Type 73C ==
Started in 1943 and completed in 1947 after WWII, the Type 73C was to be a comeback for Bugatti, but the death of Ettore Bugatti in August of that year doomed the project. An engine-less Type 73 was shown at the 1947 Paris Motor Show two months later. Although five 73C chassis had been constructed in Paris, only one body was completed, and at least three engines and one complete car were assembled and tested by the factory. Serge Pozzoli stated that he visited the Bugatti factory at Rue Debarcadere in Paris, where he saw a demonstration car which was fitted with a scaled-down body similar to the pre-war Type 50BIII "Cork Car". All the cars were dismantled and taken to Molsheim after Ettore Bugatti's death.

The Type 73C used a new 1.5 L (92 cu in) straight-4 engine with 4 valves per cylinder and a dual overhead camshaft. This was a new design with a 76 mm (3.0 in) bore and 82 mm (3.2 in) stroke, wet cylinder liners, a detachable cylinder head, and a single cast iron exhaust manifold. Much to the chagrin of Bugatti purists, the Type 73 used off-the-shelf hex fasteners rather than the custom-designed parts used in all previous cars.

The five Type 73C chassis were sold off after the company exited automobile production. Most were later assembled, and one (number 2) was even given a body based on the original Bugatti drawings.

There are a few prototype Type 73 Bugatti models:

- Type 73 touring two- or four-seater; DOHC straight-4 with four valves per cylinder
- Type 73A touring two- or four-seater; SOHC straight-4 with three valves per cylinder
- Type 73C Grand Prix single seater; similar engine to the Type 73
- Type 73B touring two- or four-seater; similar engine to the Type 73A
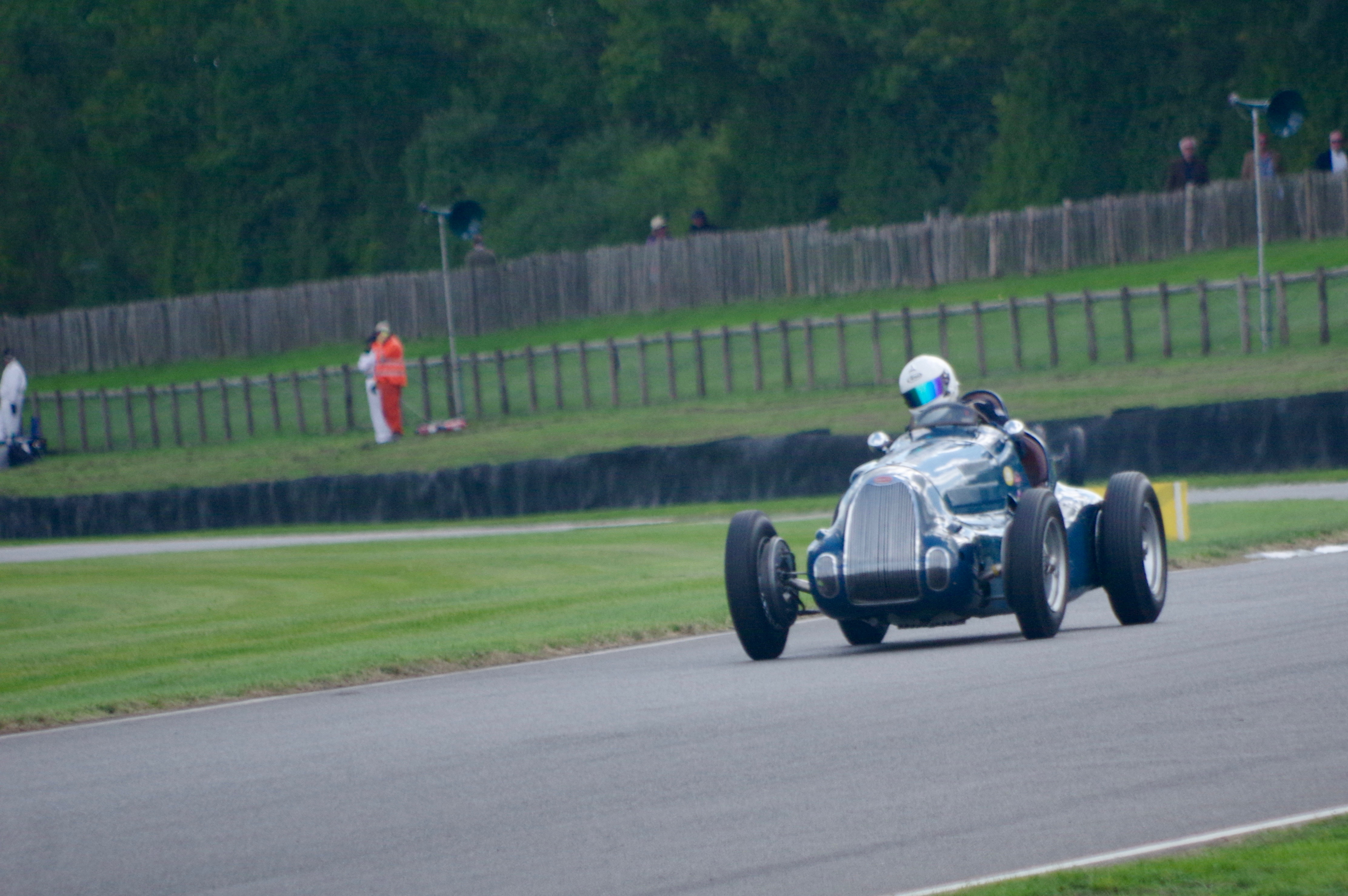
Type 73C

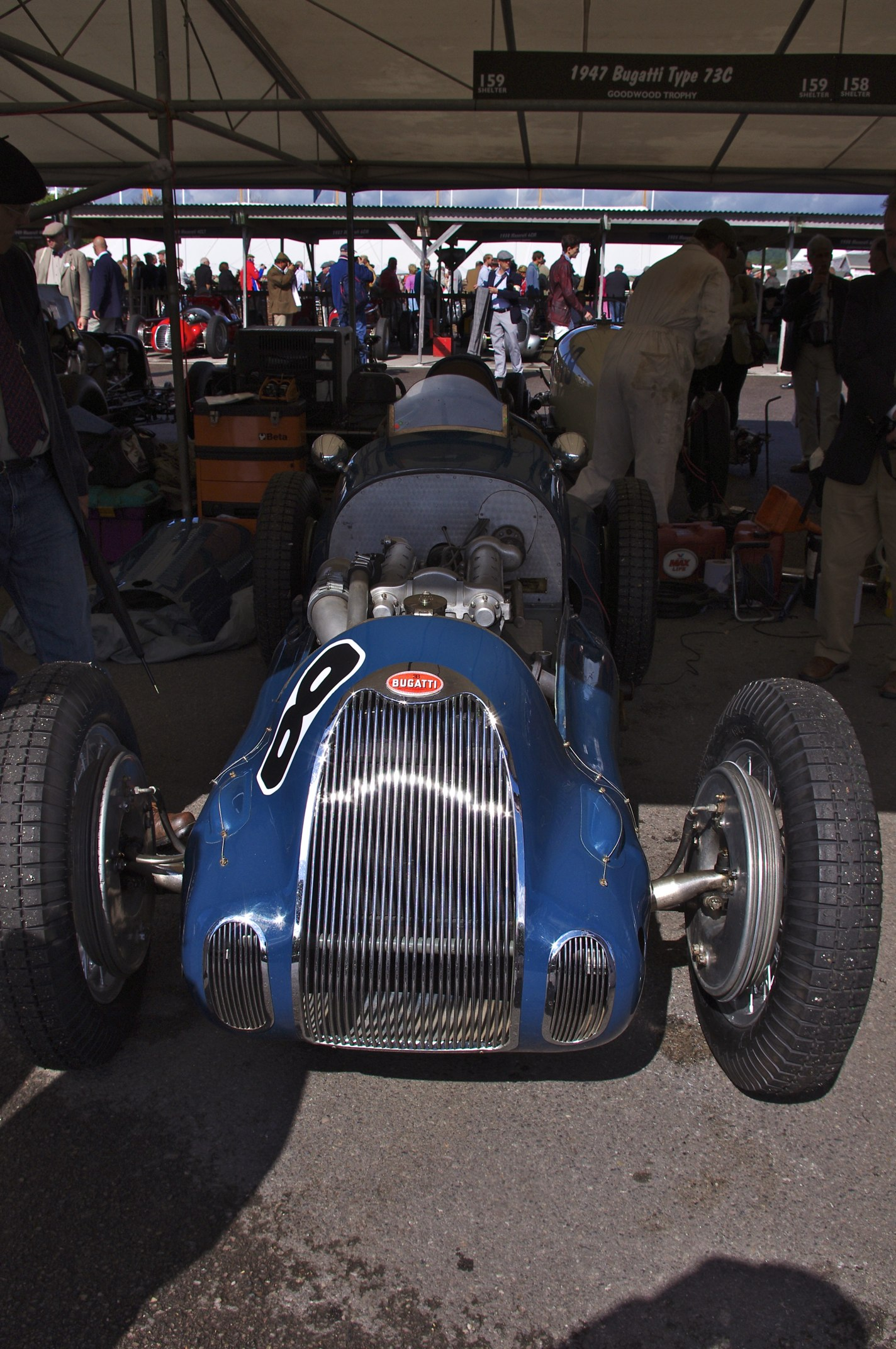
Type 73C with engine cover off

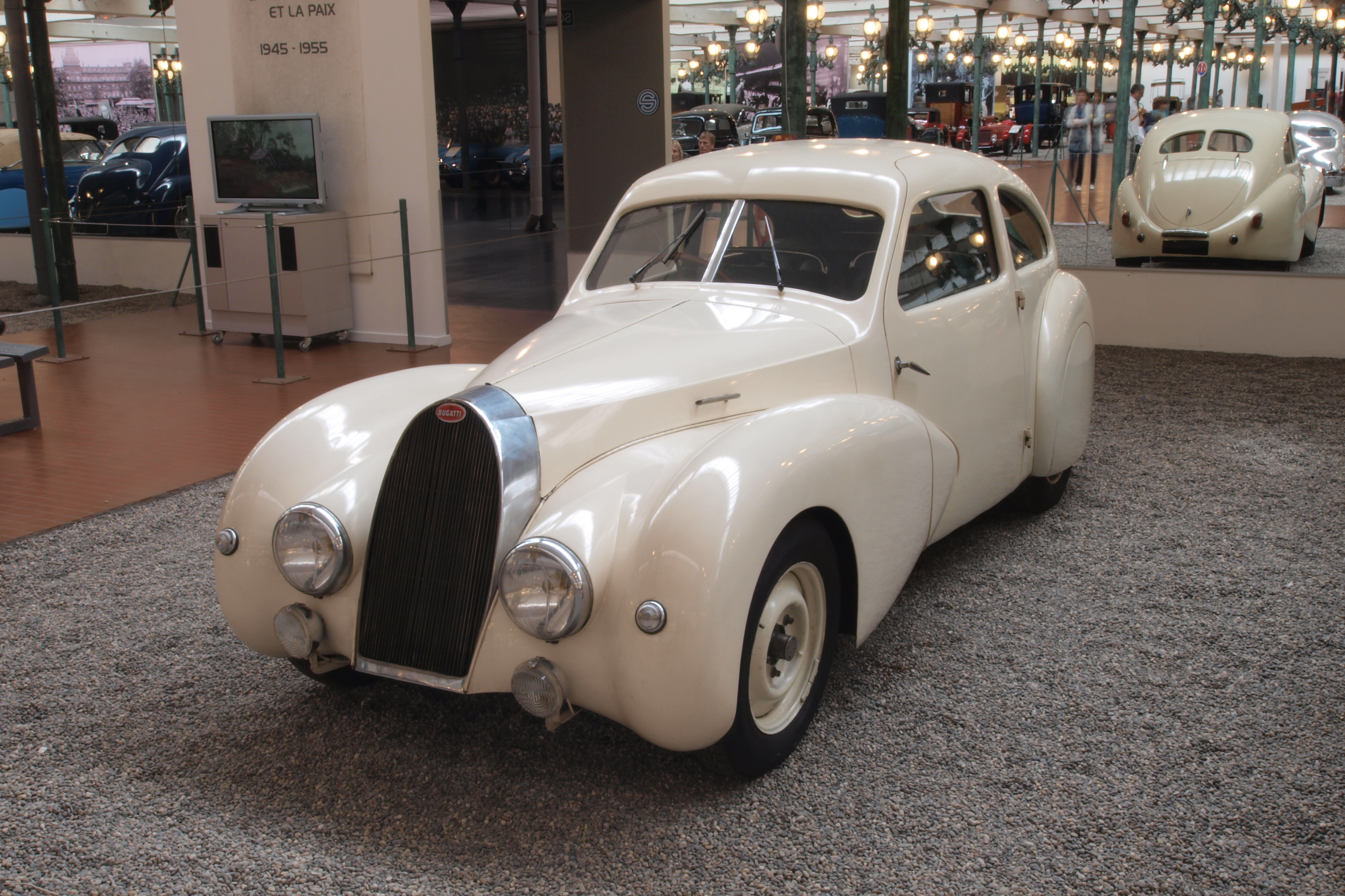
Type 73A front left

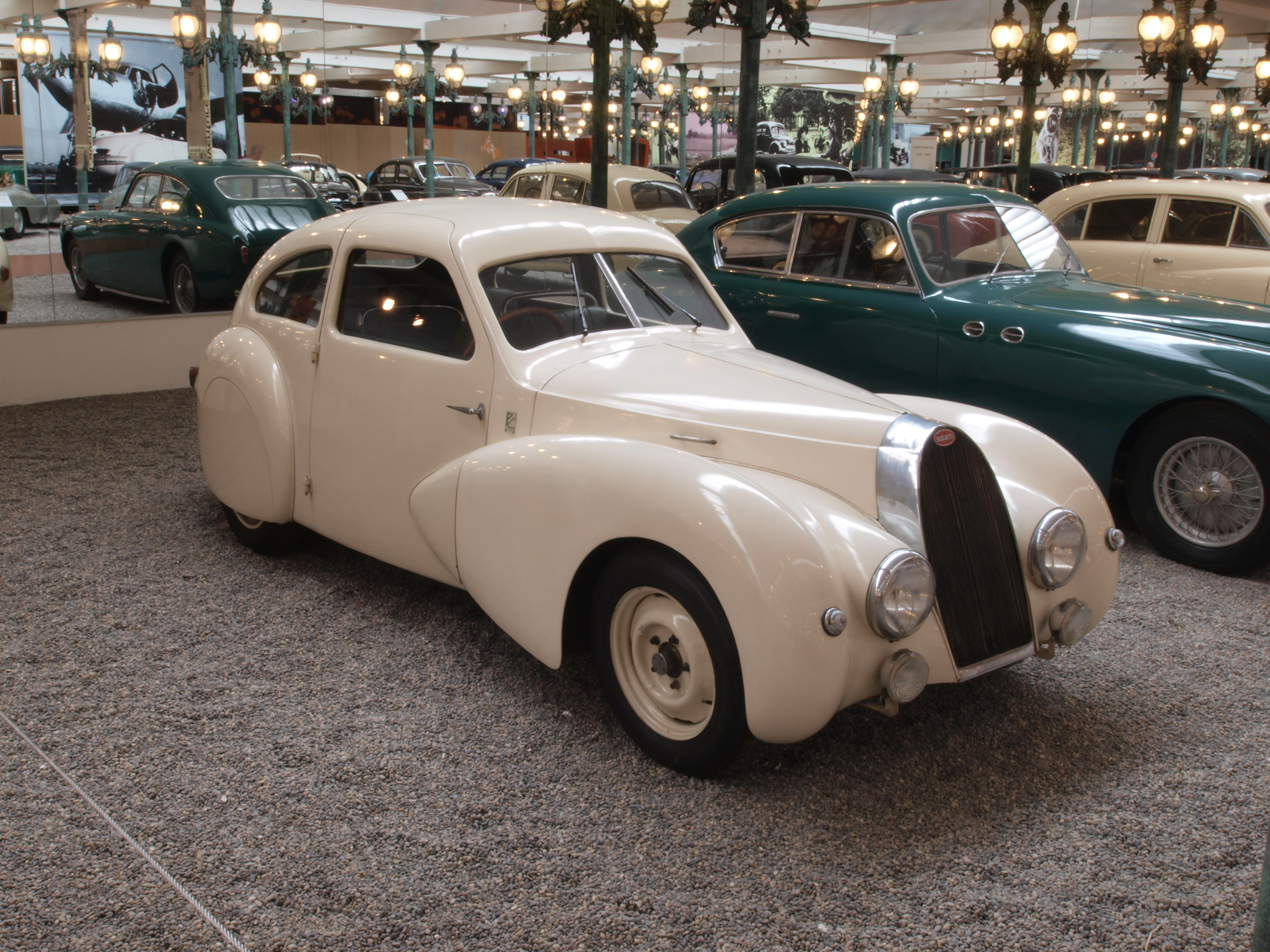
Type 73A front right

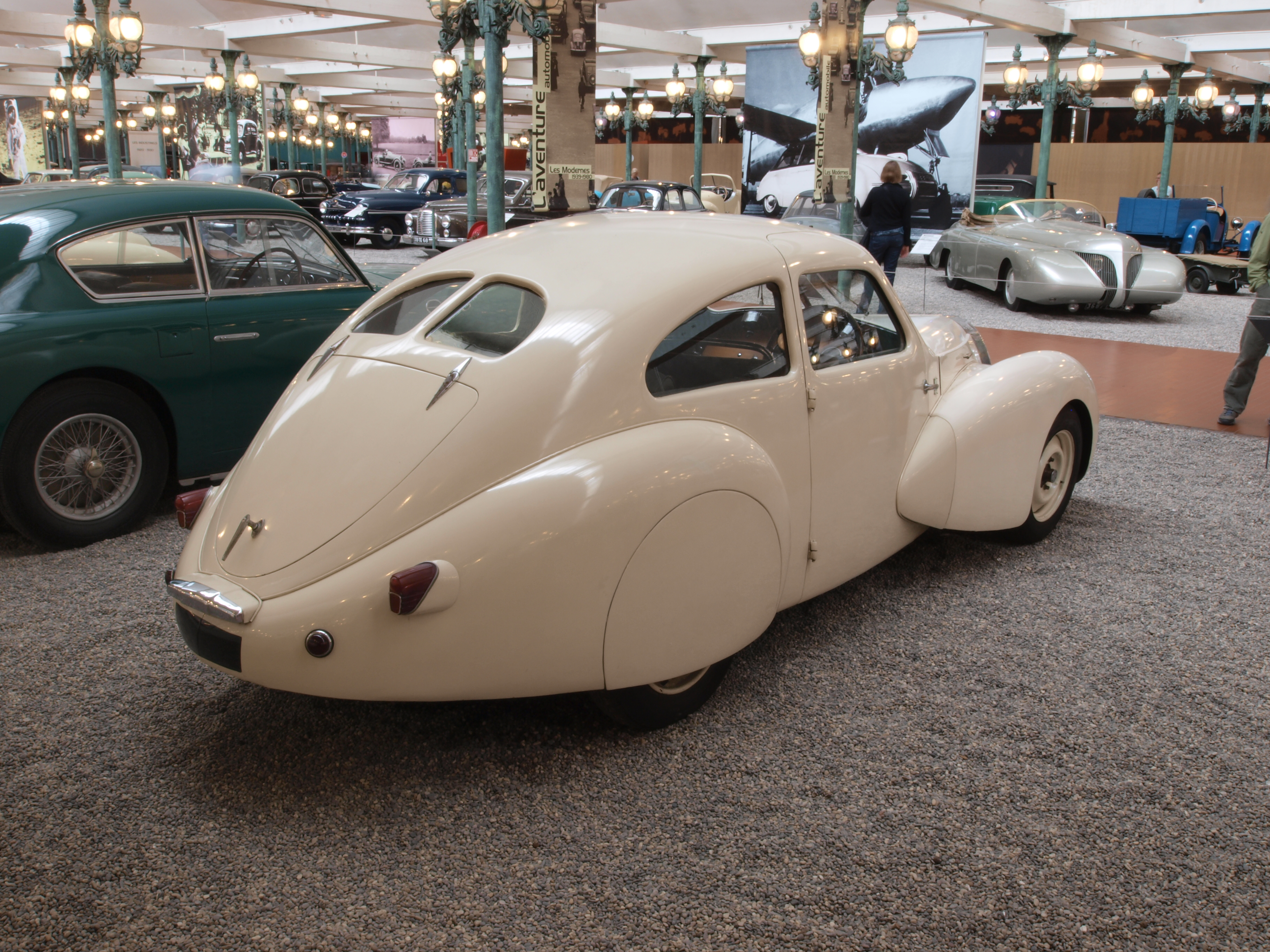
Type 73A rear right

== Type 251 ==
The final resurgence of the original Bugatti was the Type 251, completed in 1955. Designed by Gioacchino Colombo of Ferrari fame, it was powered by a new 2.5 L (150 cu in) straight-8. Uniquely, this engine was mounted transversely behind the driver. For the first time in a Bugatti, an oversquare engine was used, with a 76 mm (3.0 in) bore and 68.5 mm (2.70 in) stroke. The use of a de Dion tube rear suspension was also a novelty for the company, though it was in vogue at the time. The Type 251 was entered in the 1956 French Grand Prix, driven by Maurice Trintignant, but was not competitive and retired after 18 laps.

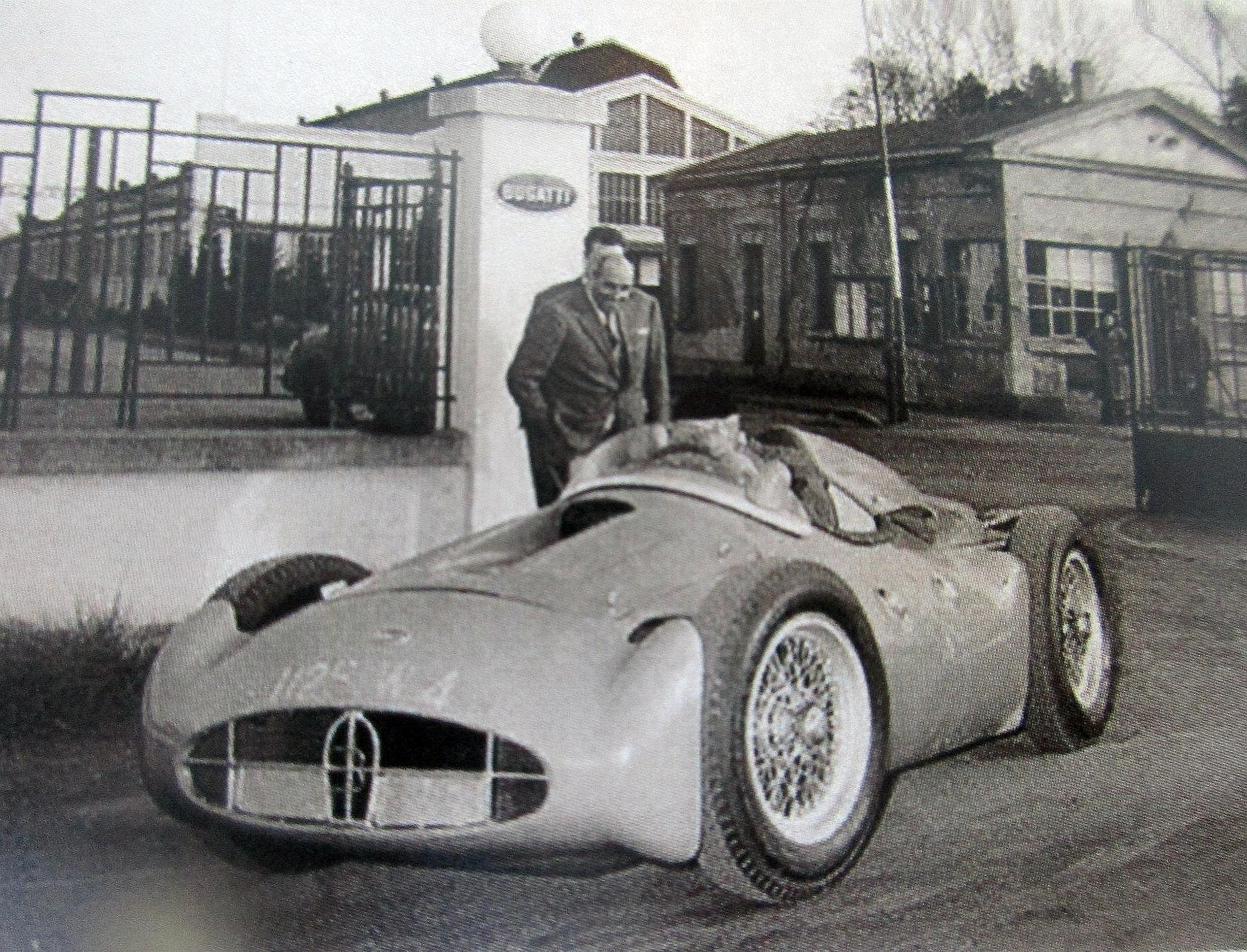
In front of the Bugatti factory in Molsheim

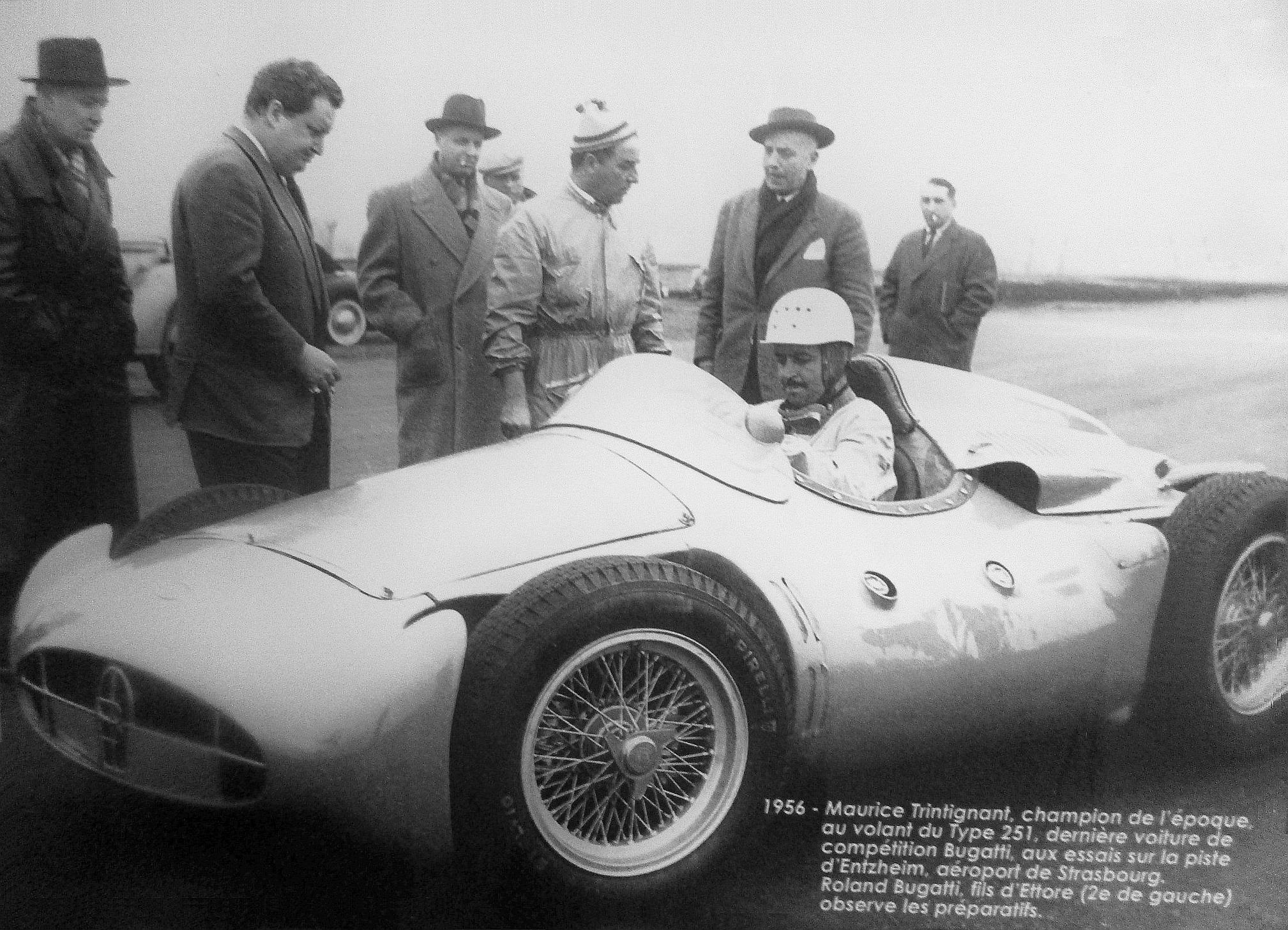
With driver Maurice Trintignant

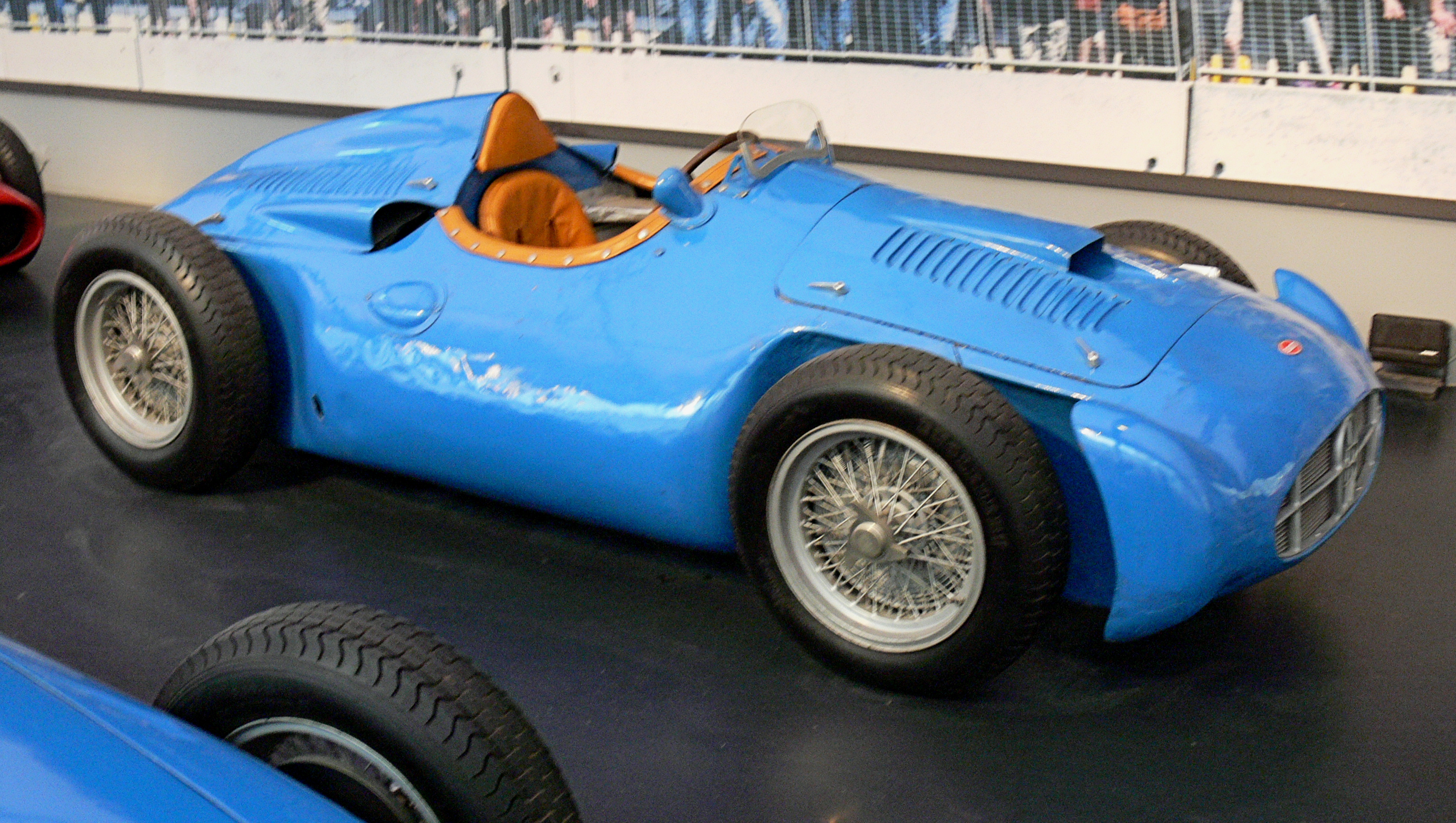
Right side

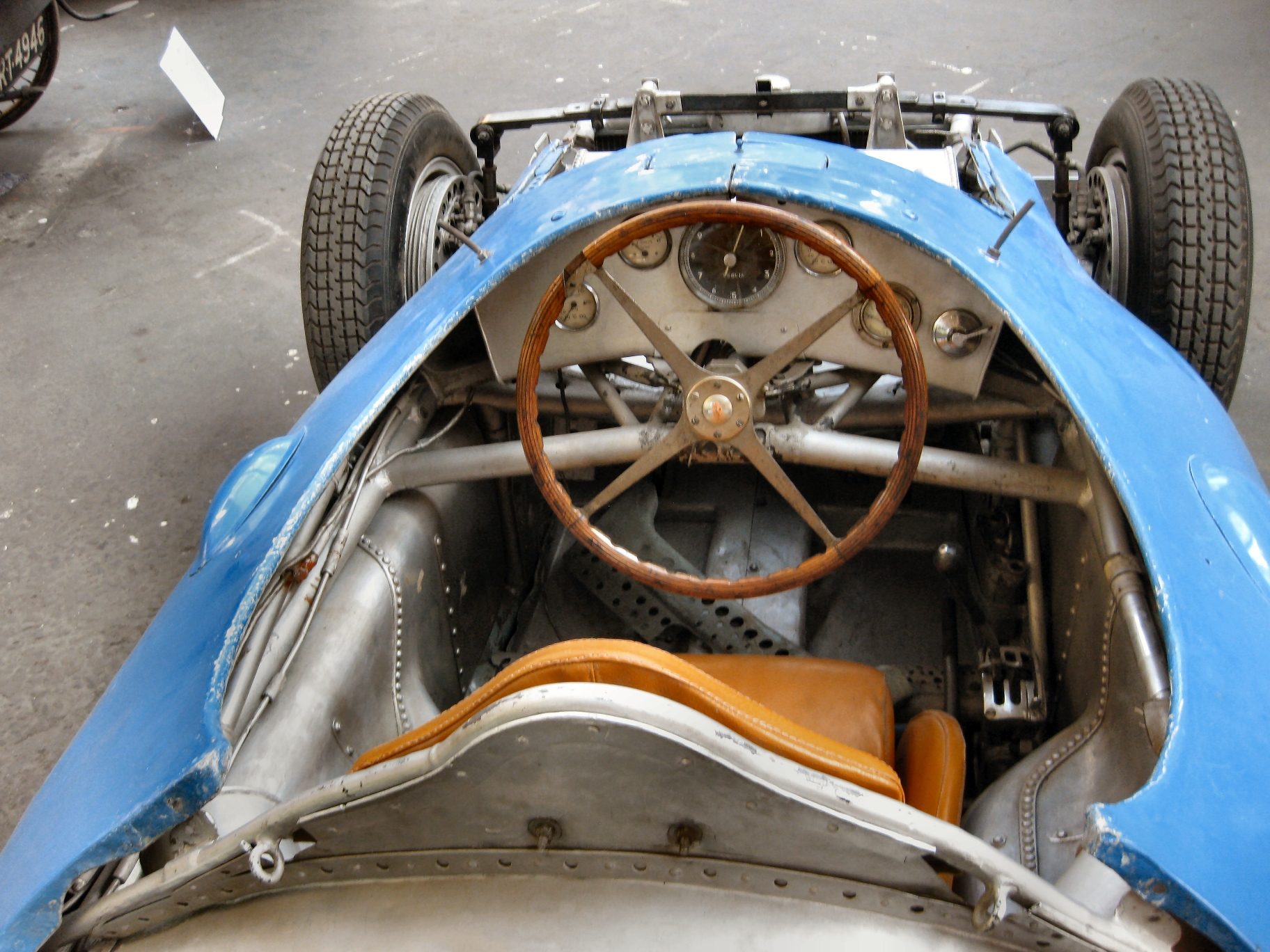
Cockpit

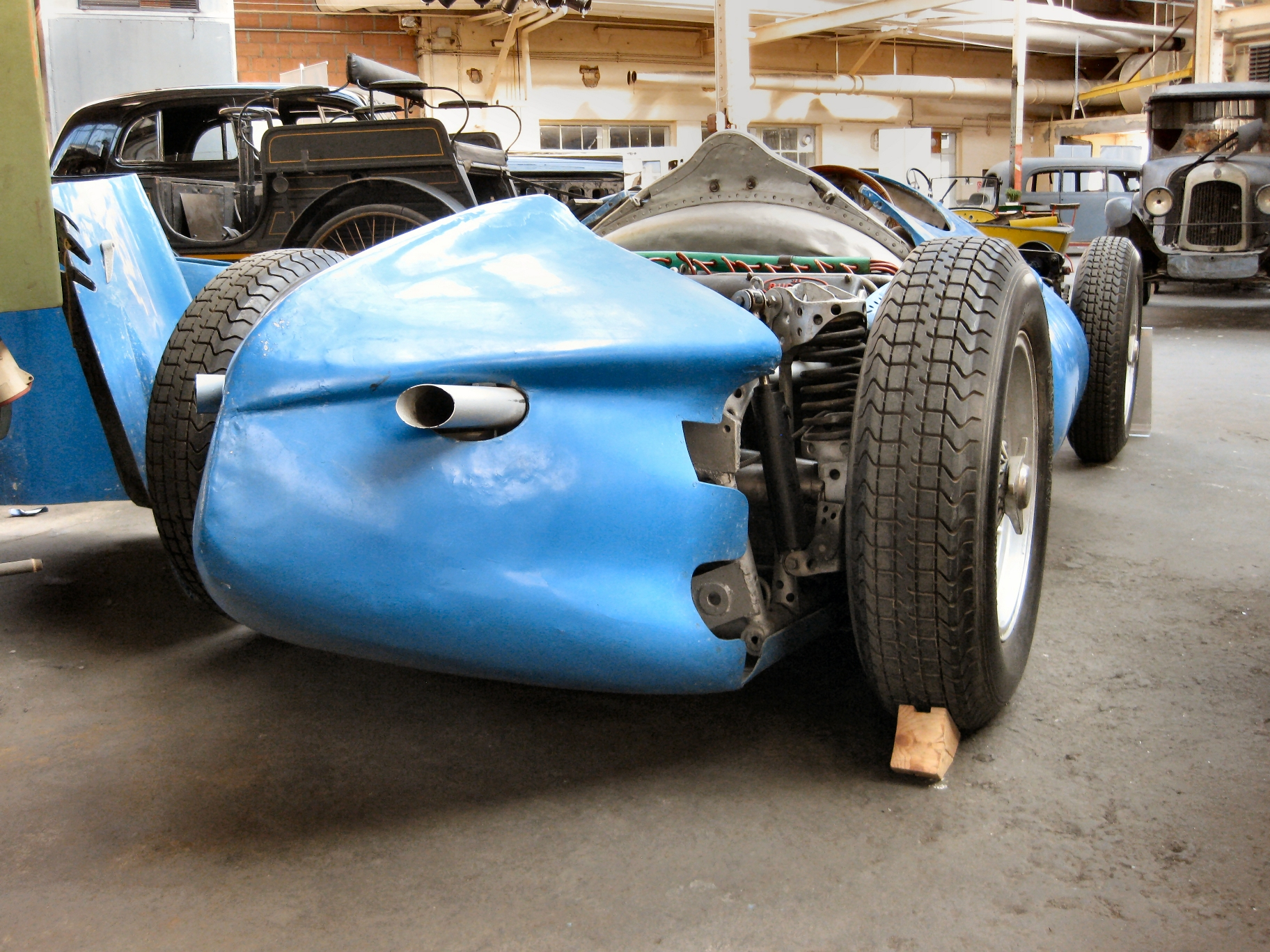
Rear

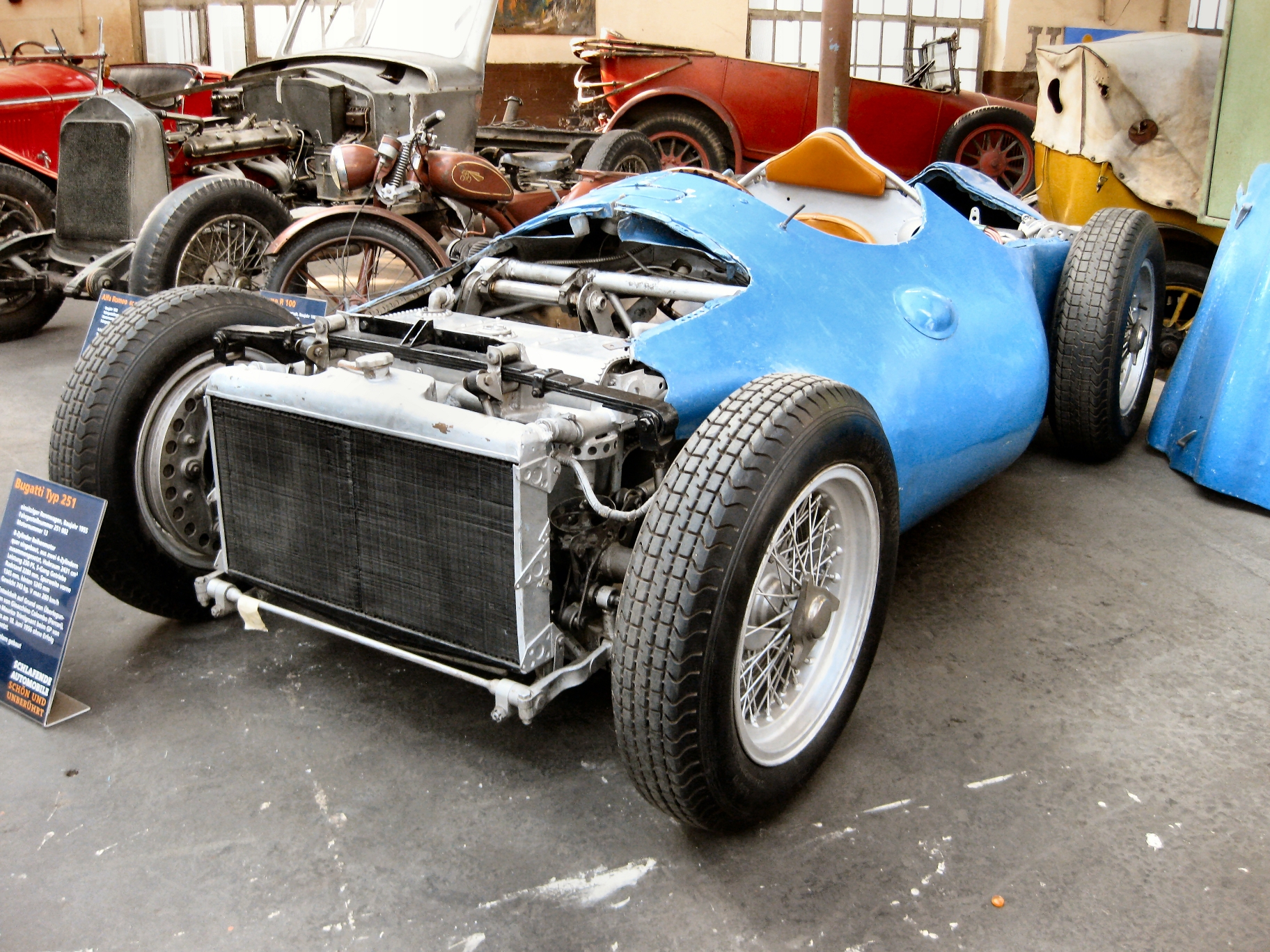
Without the front cover

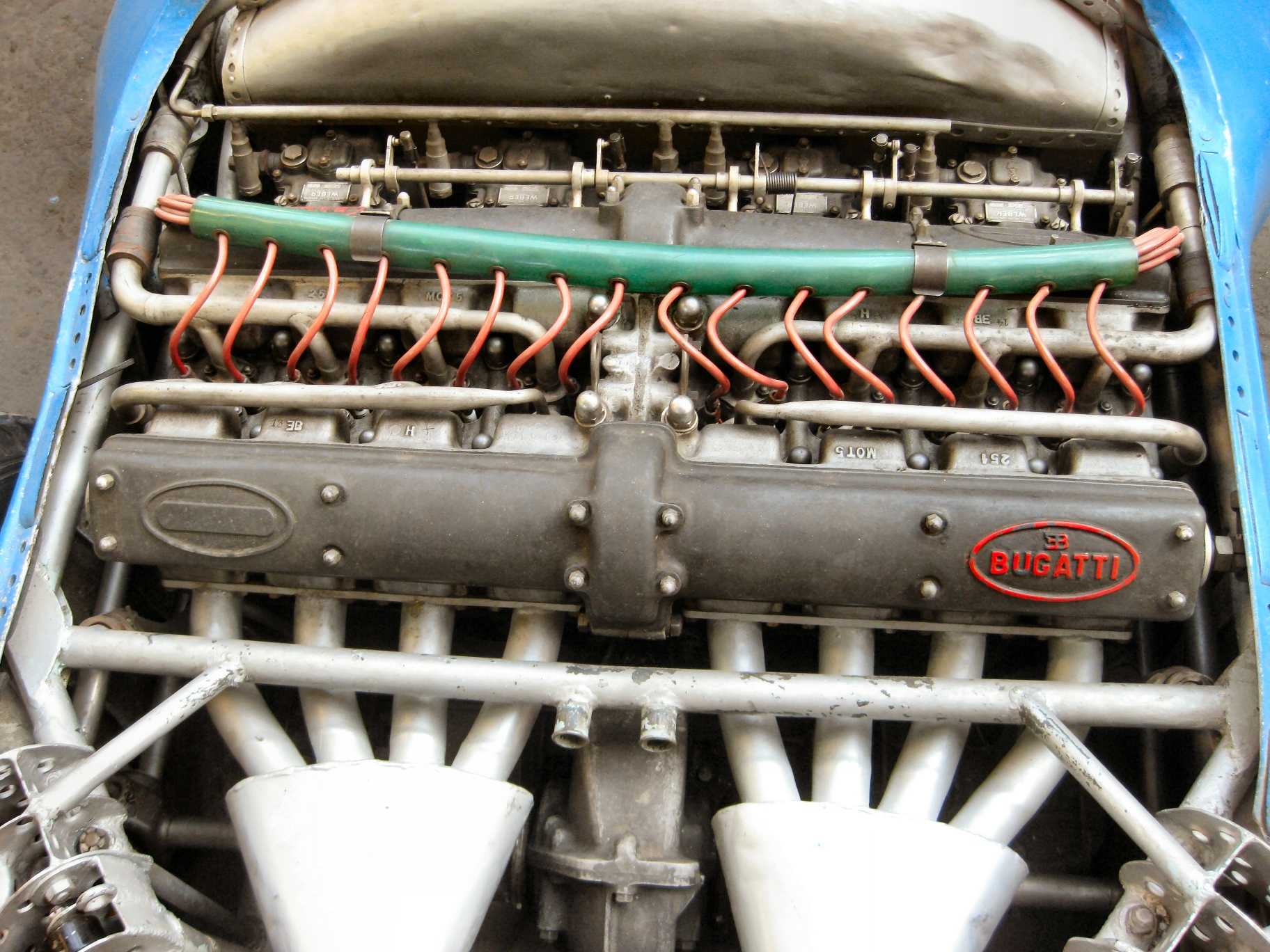
Engine

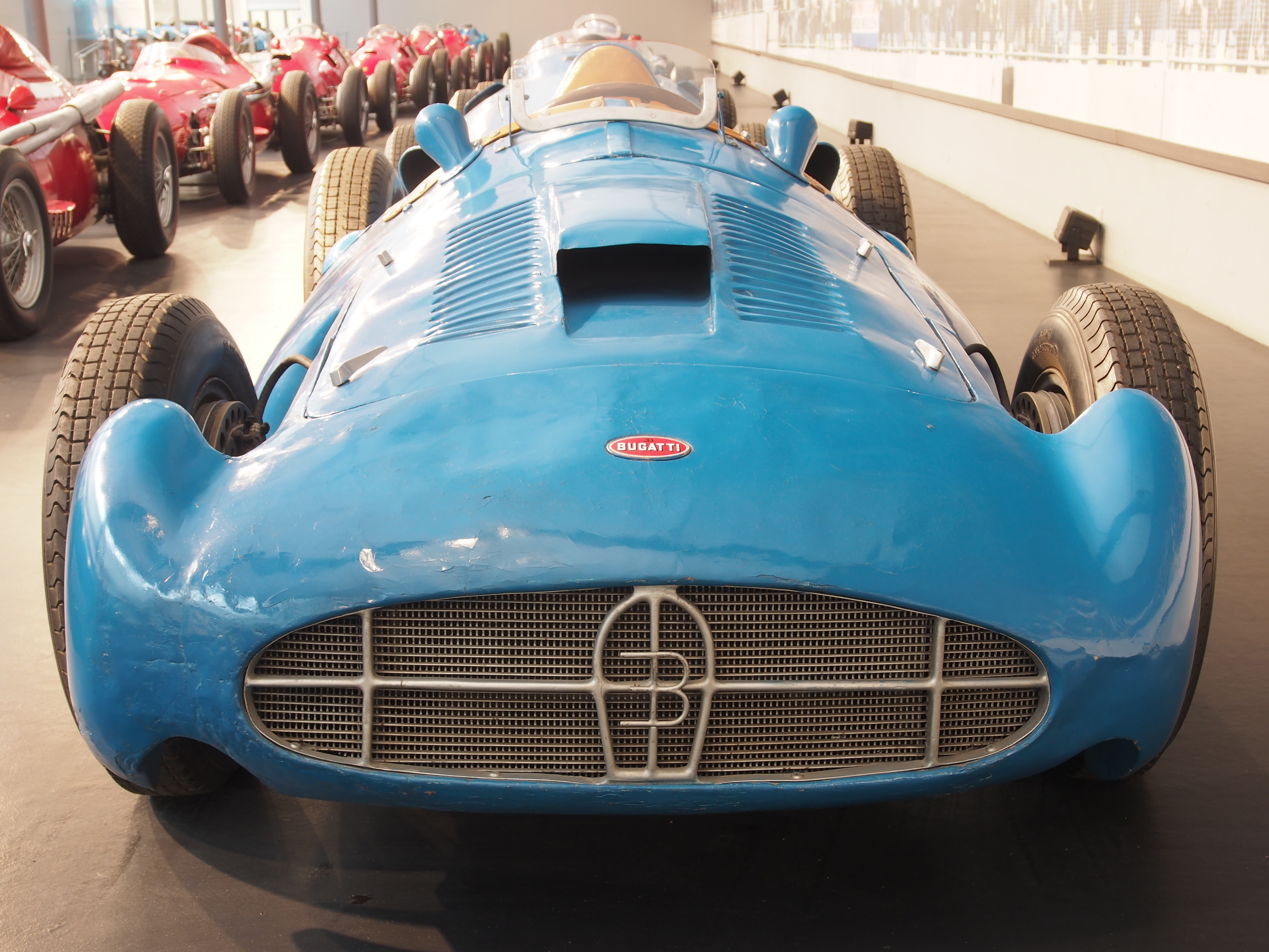
Front

== Technical data ==
	Type 45	Type 47	Type 29	Type 36	Type 64	Type 251	Type 73A	Type 73C
Engine:	U16 engine		Front mounted 8-cylinder in-line engine				4-cylinder in-line
displacement:	3800 cm³	2986 cm³	1991 cm³	1495 cm³	4433 cm³	2486 cm³	1462 cm³	1488 cm³
Bore x stroke:	60 x 84 mm	60 x 66 mm	60 x 88 mm	52 x 88 mm	84 x 100 mm	76 x 68.5 mm	70 x 95 mm	76 x 82 mm
Max power at rpm:	200-250 hp at 5 000 rpm		70 hp at 3 800 rpm	55 hp at 5 000 rpm	155 hp at 5 000 rpm	275 hp at 9 000 rpm	120 hp at 5 000 rpm	310 hp at 6 000 rpm
Valve control:	1 overhead camshaft, 3 valves per cylinder, SOHC				2 overhead camshafts, 2 valves per cylinder, DOHC		SOHC, 3 valves per cylinder	DOHC, 4 valves per cylinder
Compression:	2 Roots compressor		Naturally Aspirated			Roots	Naturally Aspirated	Roots
Carburetor:	2 Zenith 36			Zenith 36	Stromberg EE22	4 double Weber’s	Weber 36
Upload:
Gearbox:	4-speed manual					5-speed manual	4-speed manual
suspension front:	Rigid hollow shaft with semi-elliptical leaf springs running through the shaft		Rigid H-shaped axle with semi-elliptical leaf springs	Straight rigid solid axle with forward-pointing quarter-elliptical leaf springs	Rigid axle with semi-elliptical leaf springs running through the shaft
suspension rear:	Rigid axle with inverted quarter-elliptical leaf springs			Rigid axle without suspension (rubber blocks only)	Rigid axle with inverted quarter-elliptical leaf springs	The Dion axle live	Rigid axle with inverted quarter-elliptical leaf springs.
Brakes:	drums, all-round
Chassis & body:	Pressed steel ladder					Tube chassis	Pressed steel ladder
Wheelbase:	260 cm	275 cm	240 cm	250 cm	330 cm	218 cm	240 cm
Dry weight:	1100 kg		825 kg	750 kg	1265 kg	750 kg	1200 kg	700 kg
Top speed:					193 km/h
