= Diocesan administrator =

Provisional ordinary of a Catholic particular church

A diocesan administrator (also known as archdiocesan administrator, archiepiscopal administrator and eparchial administrator for the case, respectively, of an archdiocese, archeparchy, and eparchy) is a provisional ordinary of a Catholic particular church.

== Diocesan or archdiocesan administrators in canon law ==
Under the 1983 Code of Canon Law of the Latin Catholic Church, the college of consultors elects an administrator within eight days after the see is known to be vacant. The college must elect as administrator a priest, bishop, or archbishop at least 35 years old. If the college of consultors fails to elect a priest of the required minimum age within the time allotted, the choice of an administrator passes to the metropolitan archbishop or, if the metropolitan see is vacant, to the senior by appointment of the suffragan bishops of the ecclesiastical province.

If a diocese has a coadjutor bishop, the coadjutor succeeds immediately to the episcopal see upon the previous bishop's death or resignation, and there is no vacancy of the see. The see also does not become vacant if the Pope appoints an apostolic administrator.

Before the election of the administrator of a vacant see, the governance of the see is entrusted, with the powers of a vicar general, to the auxiliary bishop, if there is one, or to the senior among them, if there are several, otherwise to the college of consultors as a whole. The administrator has greater powers, essentially those of a bishop or archbishop except for matters excepted by the nature of the matter or expressly by law. Canon law subjects his activity to various legal restrictions and to special supervision by the college of consultors (as for example canons 272 and 485). The administrator remains in charge until a new bishop or archbishop is installed into office ending the sede vacante period or until he presents his resignation to the college of consultors.

Some bishops ruled more than one bishopric for long periods. In any see beside their primary bishopric, they would have to be called an administrator. Nevertheless, in local tradition often they are called bishops in all their bishoprics.

An episcopal conference can transfer the functions of the consultors to the cathedral chapter. In those countries in which the episcopal conference has transferred the functions, the cathedral chapter, and not the consultors, elect the administrator. Capitular election was the default rule before the adoption of the 1983 Code of Canon Law; this old default rule is reflected in the term for the equivalent of an administrator in the 1917 code: vicar capitular.

== Administrators of prince-bishoprics ==
Since the Investiture Controversy in 11th and 12th centuries the cathedral chapters used to elect the Catholic bishops in the Holy Roman Empire. Prince-bishoprics were elective monarchies of imperial immediacy within the Empire, with the monarch being the respective bishop usually elected by the chapter and confirmed by the Holy See, or exceptionally only appointed by the Holy See. Papally confirmed bishops were then invested by the emperor with the princely regalia, thus the title prince-bishop. However, sometimes the respective incumbent of the see never gained a papal confirmation, but was still invested with the princely power. Also the opposite occurred with a papally confirmed bishop, never invested as prince.

Candidates elected, who lacked canon law prerequisites or papal confirmation, would officially only hold the title diocesan or archdiocesan administrator (but nevertheless colloquially be referred to as prince-bishop). This was the case with Catholic candidates, who were elected for an episcopal see with its revenues as a mere appanage and with all Protestant candidates, who all lacked either the necessary vocational training or the papal confirmation.

== Protestant "elected bishops" ==
With many capitulars converting to Lutheranism or Calvinism during the Reformation, the majorities in many chapters consisted of Protestant capitulars. So they then also elected Protestants as bishops, who usually were denied papal confirmation. However, in the early years of Reformation, with the schism not yet fully implemented, it was not always obvious who tended to Protestantism, so that some candidates only turned out to be Protestants after they had been papally confirmed as bishop and imperially invested as prince. Later, when Protestants were usually denied papal confirmation, the emperors nevertheless invested the unconfirmed candidates as princes - by a so-called liege indult (German: Lehnsindult) - due to political coalitions and conflicts within the empire, in order to gain candidates as imperial partisans.

Many Protestant candidates, elected by the capitulars, neither achieved papal confirmation nor a liege indult, but nevertheless, as a matter of fact held de facto princely power. This was because the emperor would have to use force to bar the candidates from ruling, with the emperors lacking the respective power or pursuing other goals. A similar situation was in a number of imperially immediate abbeys with their prince-abbots and princess-abbesses.

Unconfirmed incumbents of the sees were called Elected Bishops or Elected Archbishops. The information that Protestant clerical rulers would generally have been called administrators, as written in several encyclopedias, does not fit historically documented practice. In their dioceses as well as in their territories, they had almost the same power as Catholic prince-bishops. However, one common restriction was that administered prince-bishoprics were denied to emit their deputies to the diets of the Empire or of the imperial circles (German: Reichstag, or Kreistag, respectively). Conversions of territories were banned by the with Reservatum ecclesiasticum. This restriction was abandoned by the Peace of Westphalia in 1648, when the emperor accepted Protestant administrators as fully empowered rulers. However, the Peace also secularised many of the prior Protestant prince-bishoprics and transformed them into hereditary monarchies.

=== Prince-bishoprics ruled by Protestant bishops ===
Prince-bishoprics which were ruled by Protestants, were the following:

- Prince-Bishopric of Brandenburg, Lutheran bishops and administrators since 1539, secularised and merged into the Electorate of Brandenburg in 1571.
- Prince-Archbishopric of Bremen, Lutheran administrators since 1567, secularised as hereditary Duchy of Bremen in 1648
- Prince-Bishopric of Cammin, Lutheran bishops and administrators since 1544, secularised and merged into the Duchy of Pomerania in 1650
- Electoral Prince-Archbishopric of Cologne, Lutheran bishop c. 1542–1546, however, Catholic prince-bishop, from 1546, was thought over during the Cologne War (1583–1588), however, Catholic prince-bishop, from 1588, secularised and merged into the Landgraviate of Hesse-Darmstadt in 1803
- Prince-Bishopric of Halberstadt, Lutheran administrators 1566–1628, after the rule of the last, however, Catholic administrator, secularised as Principality of Halberstadt in 1648
- Prince-Bishopric of Havelberg, Lutheran bishops and administrators since 1558, secularised and merged into the Electorate of Brandenburg in 1598.
- Prince-Bishopric of Lebus, Lutheran bishop and administrators since 1555, secularised and merged into the Electorate of Brandenburg in 1598.
- Prince-Bishopric of Lübeck, Lutheran bishops and administrators in 1535 and from 1555 on, secularised as Principality of Lübeck in 1803
- Prince-Archbishopric of Magdeburg, Lutheran administrators between 1566 and 1631 and again since 1638, secularised as hereditary Duchy of Magdeburg in 1680
- Prince-Bishopric of Meißen, secularised and merged into the Electorate of Saxony in 1581
- Prince-Bishopric of Merseburg, Lutheran administrators since 1544, secularised and merged into the Electorate of Saxony in 1565
- Prince-Bishopric of Minden, Lutheran administrators between 1554 and 1631, after the rule of the last, however, Catholic prince-bishop, secularised as Principality of Minden in 1648
- Prince-Bishopric of Merseburg, Lutheran bishop and administrators between 1544 and 1549 and from 1562 on, secularised and merged into the Electorate of Saxony in 1615
- Prince-Bishopric of Naumburg, Lutheran bishop and administrators between 1542 and 1547 and from 1562 on, secularised and merged into the Electorate of Saxony in 1615
- Prince-Bishopric of Osnabrück, Lutheran bishops and administrators between 1574 and 1623, and Lutheran administrators and Catholic bishops in alternate succession since 1634, secularised and merged into the Electorate of Brunswick and Lunenburg in 1803
- Prince-Bishopric of Ratzeburg, Lutheran administrators since 1554, secularised as the Principality of Ratzeburg in 1648
- Prince-Bishopric of Schwerin, Lutheran administrators since 1533, secularised as the Principality of Schwerin in 1648
- Prince-Bishopric of Strasbourg, was thought over during the Strasbourg Bishops' War (1592–1604), however, Catholic prince-bishop, from 1604, secularised and merged into the Margraviate of Baden in 1803
- Prince-Bishopric of Verden, Lutheran bishop and administrators between 1574 and 1630, and, after the rule of the last, however, Catholic prince-bishop, from 1631 on, secularised as Principality of Verden in 1648

== See also ==
- Hierarchy of the Catholic Church#Equivalents of diocesan bishops in law
