= Molsheim =

Molsheim Molse
- Subprefecture and commune
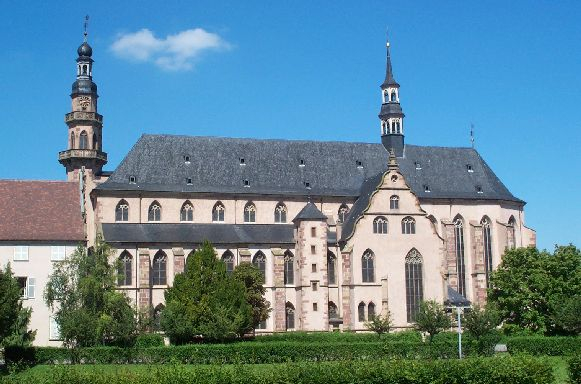
- Église des Jésuites

- Coat of arms
- Location of Molsheim
- Location within France Location within Grand Est
- Coordinates: 48°32′N 7°29′E
- Country: France
- Region: Grand Est
- Department: Bas-Rhin
- Arrondissement: Molsheim
- Canton: Molsheim

Government
  - Mayor (2020–2026): Laurent Furst (LR)
- Area^{1}: 10.85 km^{2} (4.19 sq mi)
- Elevation: 180 m (590 ft)
- Highest elevation: 371 m (1,217 ft)
- Lowest elevation: 165 m (541 ft)
- Population (2023): 9,318
  - Density: 858.8/km^{2} (2,224/sq mi)
- Time zone: UTC+01:00 (CET)
  - Summer (DST): UTC+02:00 (CEST)
- INSEE/Postal code: 67300 /67120
- ^{1} French Land Register data, which excludes lakes, ponds, glaciers > 1 km^{2} (0.386 sq mi or 247 acres) and river estuaries.

Molsheim (French pronunciation: [mɔlsɛm]; also [mɔlsajm]) is a commune and a subprefecture in the Bas-Rhin department in Grand Est in north-eastern France. The total population in 2023 was 9,318. Molsheim had been a very fast-growing city between the French censuses of 1968 and 1999, passing from 5,739 to 9,335 inhabitants, but this increase came to a noticeable halt since. Molsheim is the centre of an urban unit with about 27,000 inhabitants (2022). It is part of the metropolitan area of Strasbourg.

== Cityscape ==
The old town of Molsheim is well preserved and contains a considerable number of old houses and buildings of typically Alsatian architecture. The most notable buildings are the medieval Tour des Forgerons, the Renaissance Metzig, the baroque (although built in late gothic style) Église des Jésuites – an inordinately large church insofar as it could house the entire population of the town when built – and the classical Hôtel de ville. The former monastery La Chartreuse, partly destroyed in the French Revolution, now houses a museum; covering an area of 3 hectares (7.4 acres), it used to be a genuine city within the city.

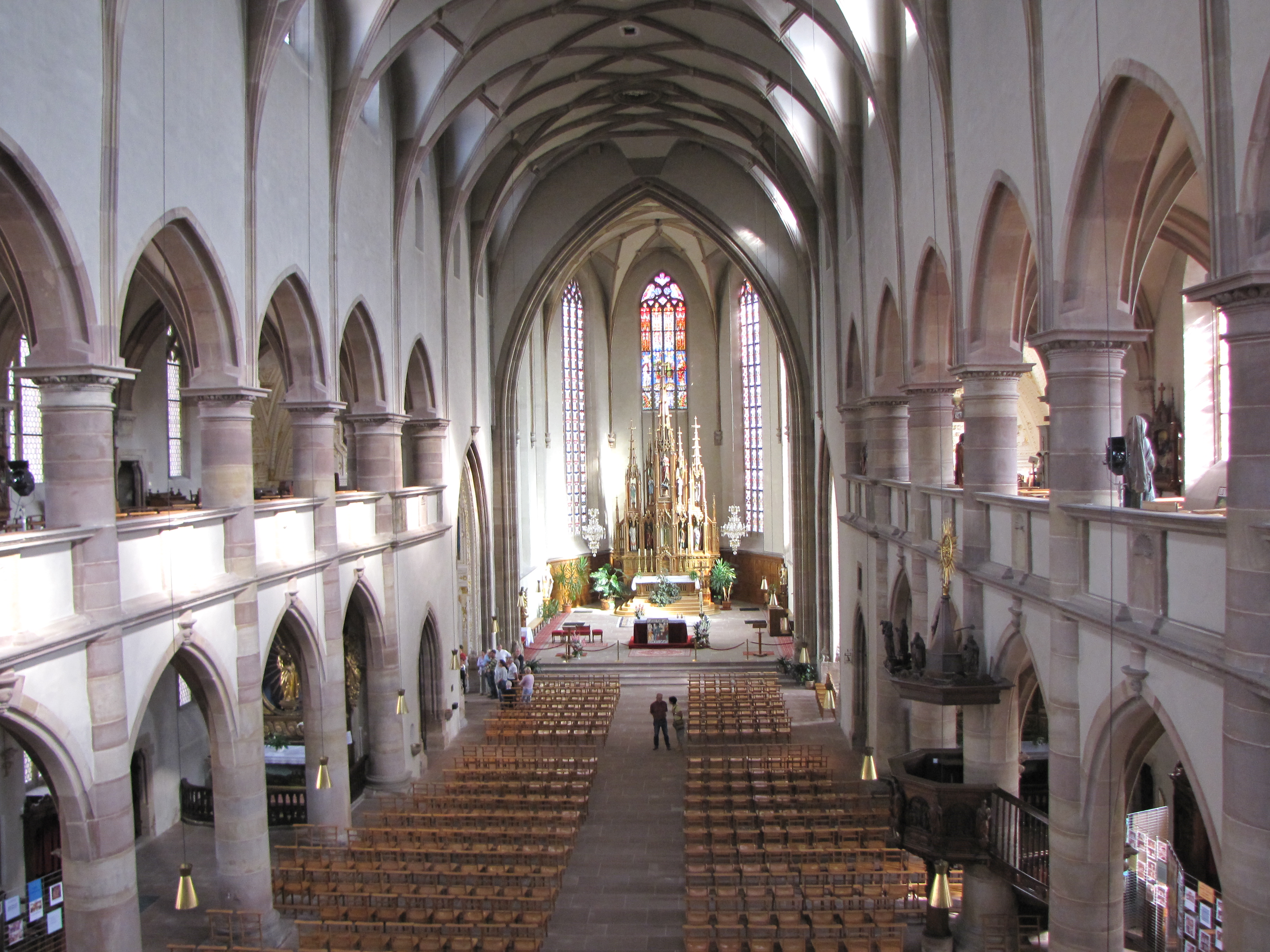
Nave and choir of Église des Jésuites

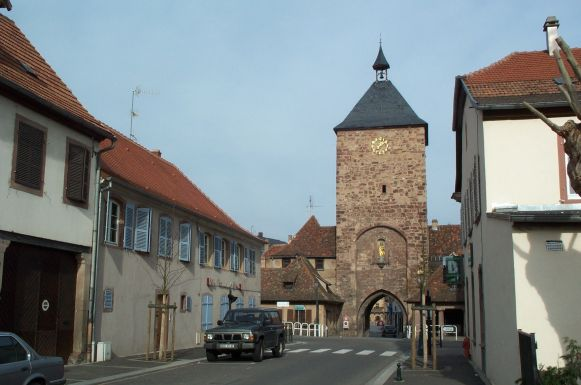
Porte des forgerons

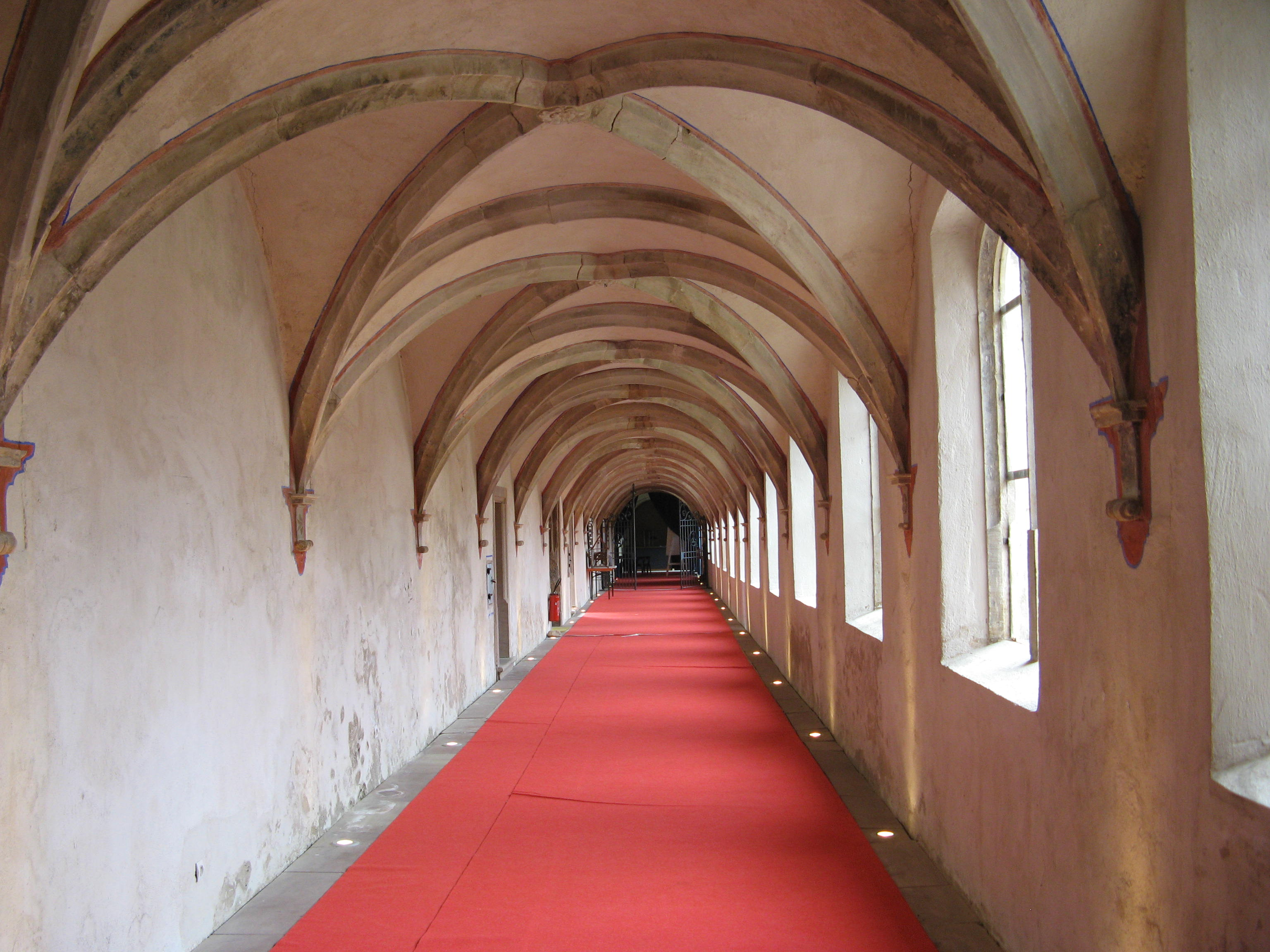
Cloister of the former Chartreuse (Carthusian monastery)

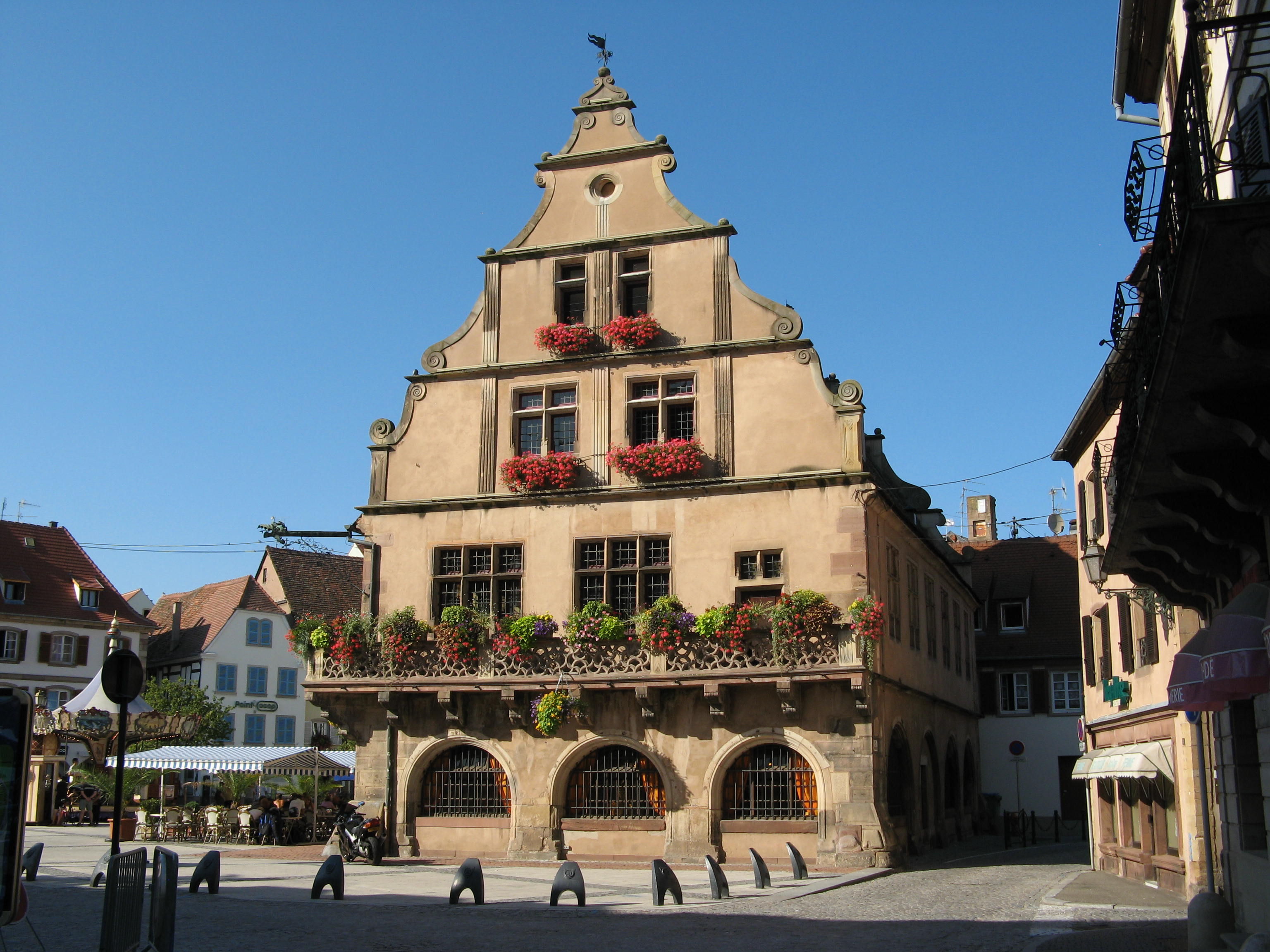
Metzig (lateral view)

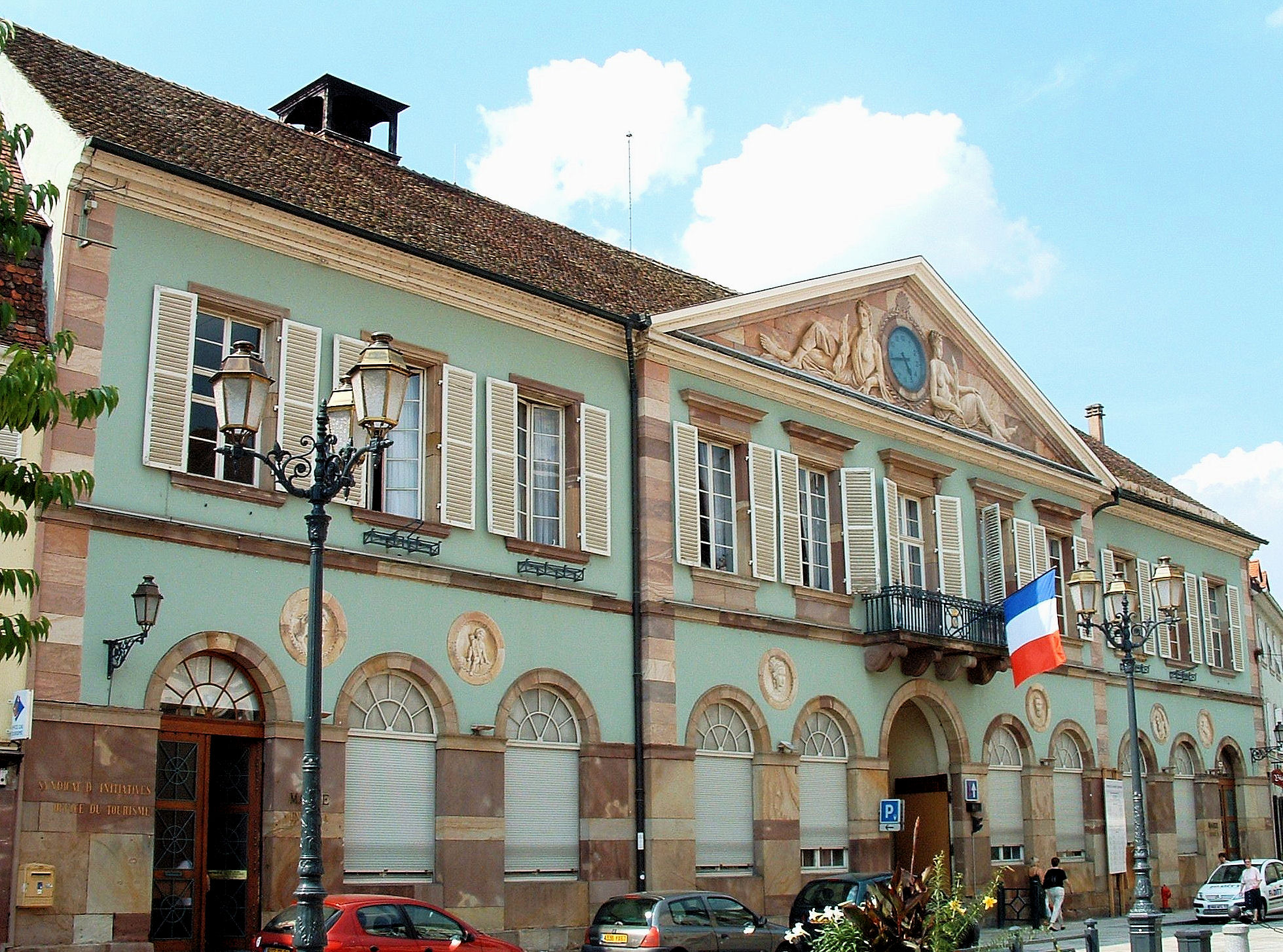
Town hall

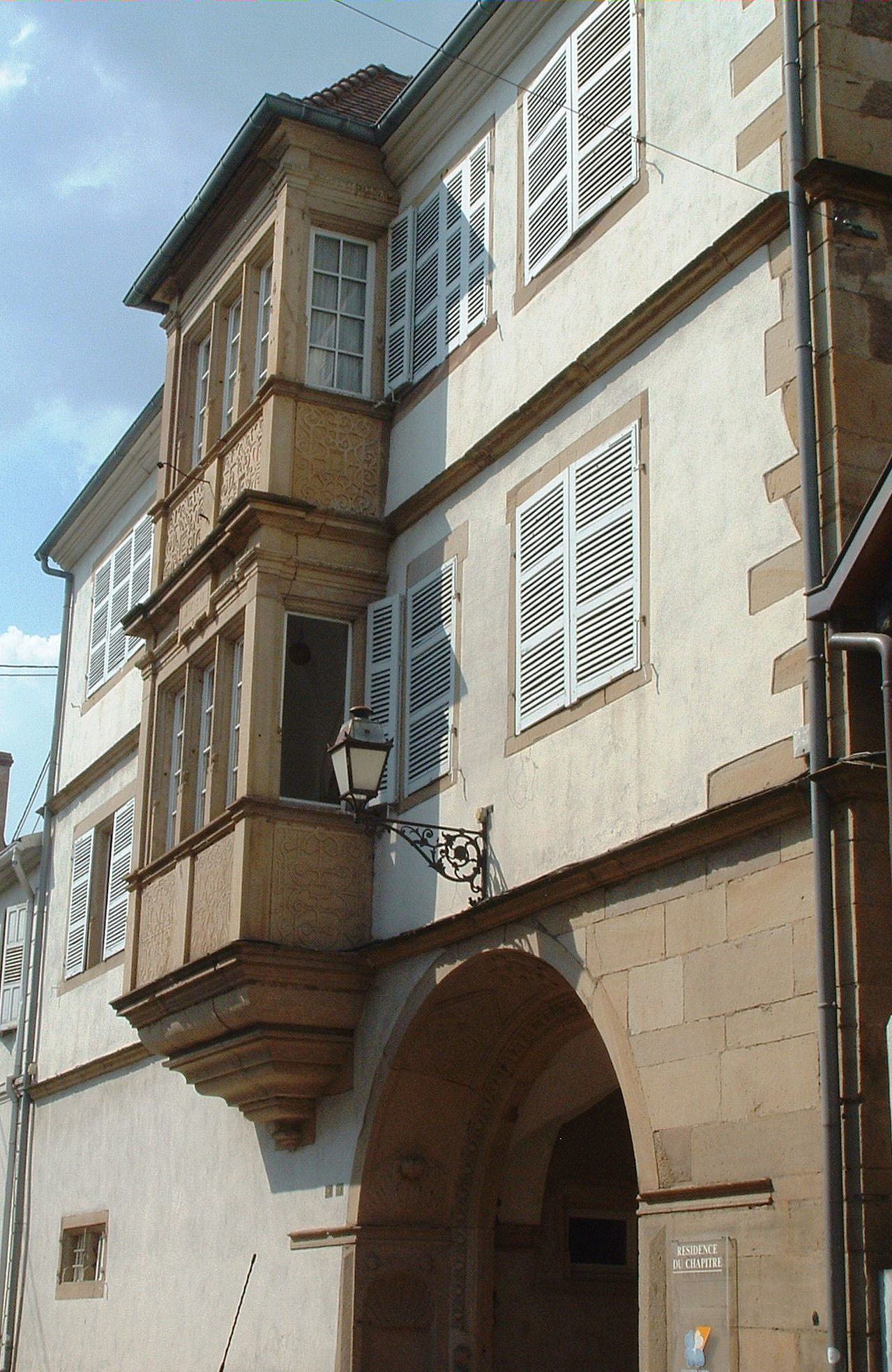
House of canons

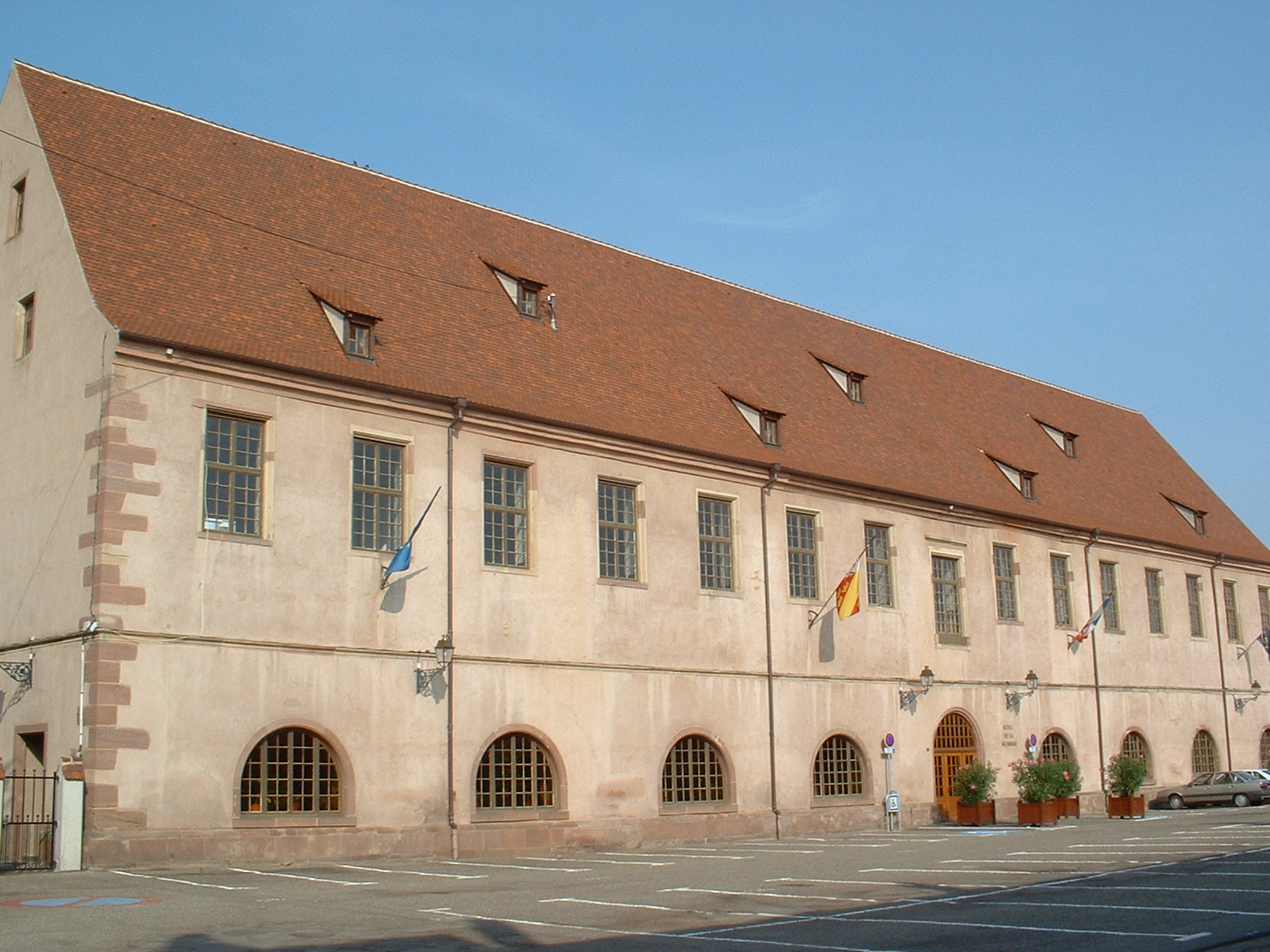
Hôtel de la monnaie (old money manufacture)

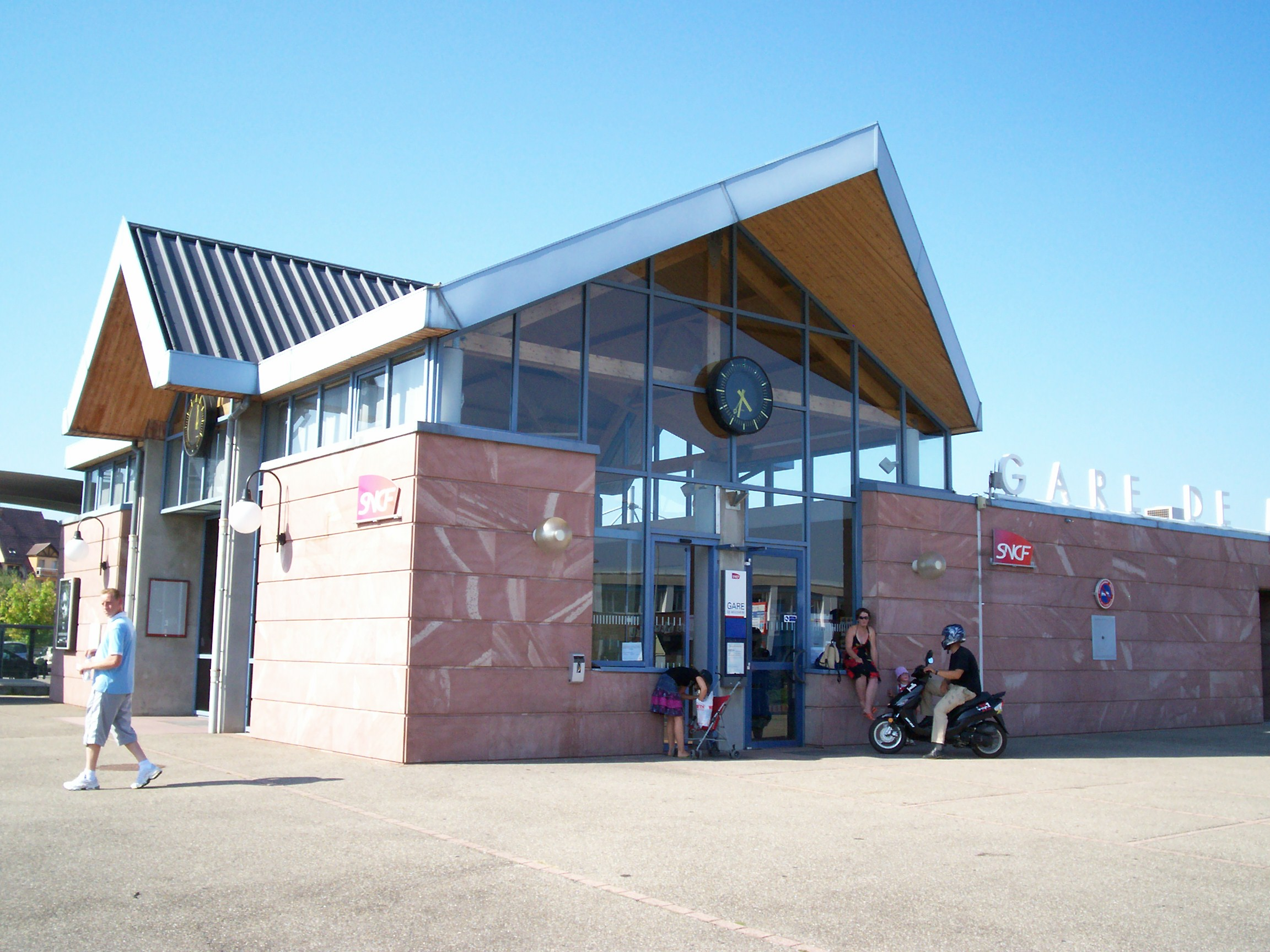
Railway station

== History ==
Excavations carried out to the north of Molsheim in 1935 revealed the presence of many Merovingian tombs (sixth and seventh centuries), along the old Roman road going to Avolsheim. "Mollesheim" was first mentioned about 820, in a deed of donating a vineyard of the bishop Adeloch to the chapter of Saint-Thomas. Bishop Adeloch is buried in the church of Saint-Thomas in Strasbourg.

In 1219, the Holy Roman Emperor Frederick II granted the town many rights and franchises. By 1263 Molsheim was already surrounded by a wall which, in the medieval sense, made the town a city. However, the bishops of Strasbourg continued to own properties in Molsheim, resulting in conflicts with the Germanic emperors, a quarrel that was resolved in 1308 in favor of Bishop Jean de Dürbheim (German: Johann I. von Straßburg). Jean de Dürbheim enlarged the city wall in 1318 and built a château. When the bishop died in 1328, he was entombed in the chapel of a hospice he had founded, the future site of the Jesuit church, which is the present parish church of Molsheim. His tomb is still visible today.

=== Molsheim as a center of the Counter-Reformation ===
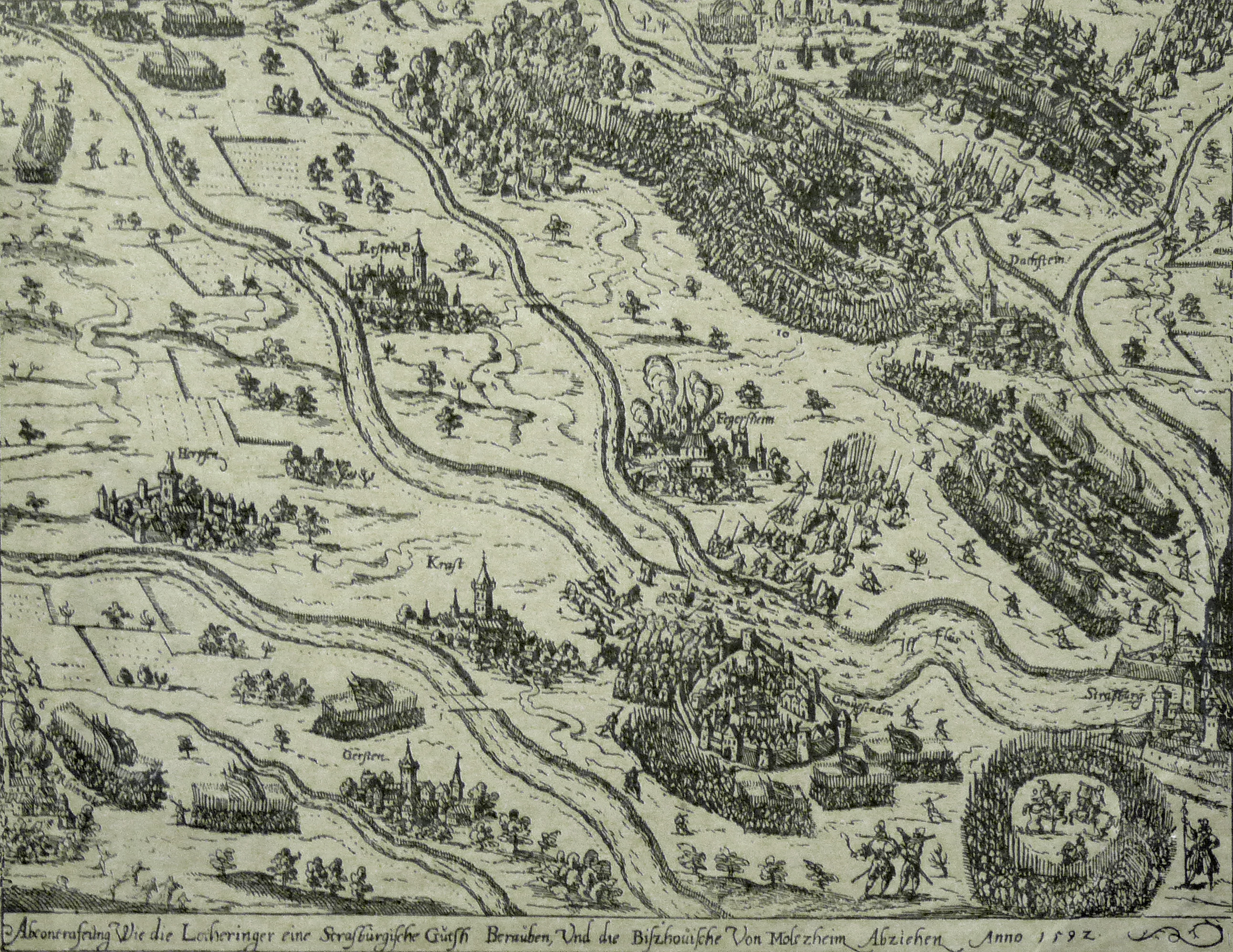
Etching depicting skirmishes between Dachstein and Molsheim on 2 December 1592

The strength of the Protestant Reformation in the Alsace and especially Strasbourg put pressure on Catholic institutions. In 1580 Laurent Gutjahr, the abbot of Altorf, acquired property in Molsheim; the Benedictines, established since the 11th century in Altorf, a town lacking fortifications, moved here for safety behind the ramparts of Molsheim. Also in 1580, the Jesuits established a school in Molsheim which Leopold V, Archduke of Austria. Similarly, in 1591, due to the suppression of the Carthusians in Strasbourg, members of the order moved to Molsheim and built a convent, the splendid stained glass of which was partly destroyed during the French Revolution. The stained glass that survived the Revolution was eventually transferred to Strasbourg.

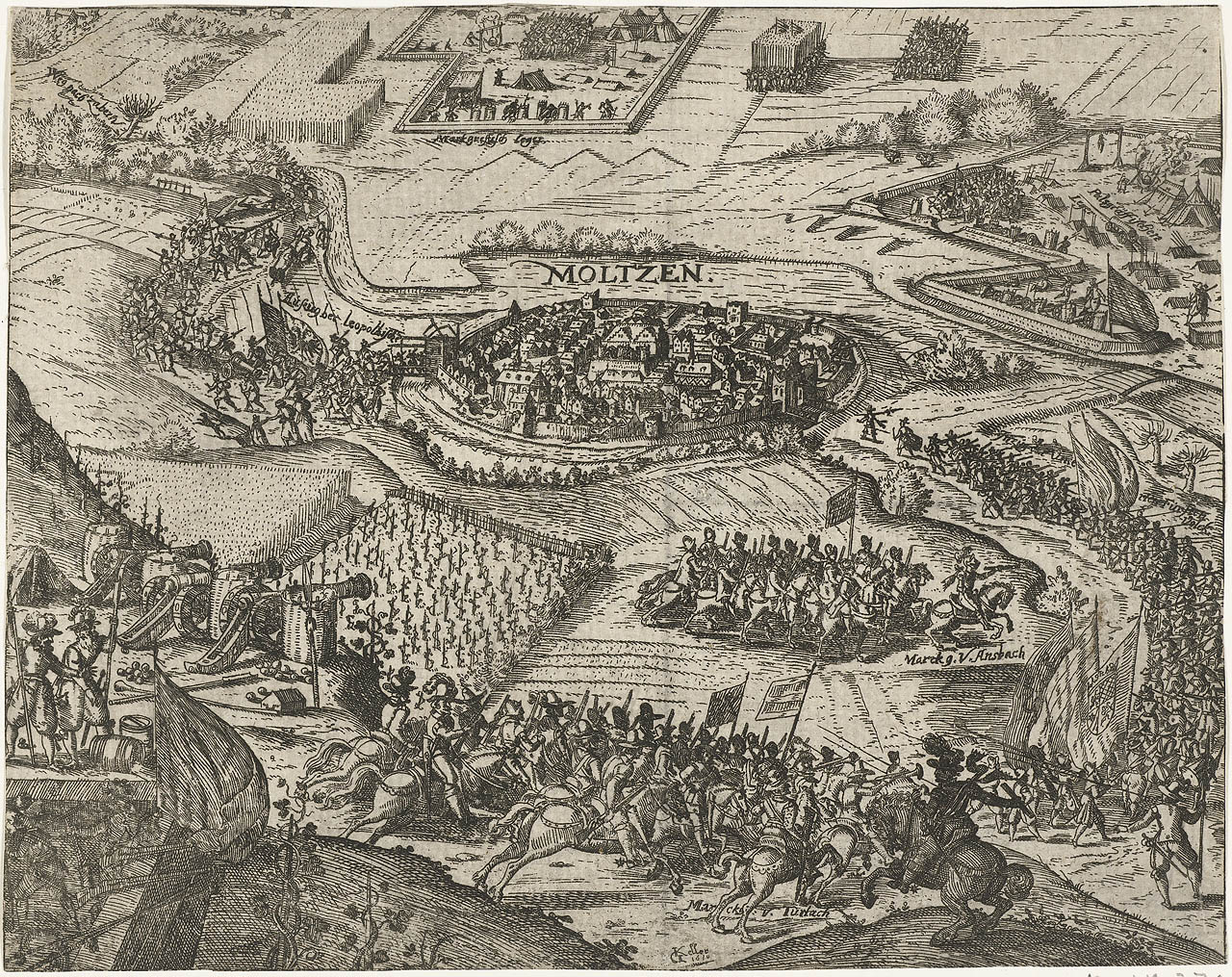
Siege of Molsheim (1610)

In 1592, with the death of the bishop Jean de Manderscheid, a conflict arose between the catholic parishioners of Molsheim and the Protestant majority in the chapter of the diocese of Strasbourg, who elected Johann Georg von Brandenburg) as the bishop of Strasbourg; in opposition the Catholics elected Charles of Lorraine (bishop of Metz and Strasbourg). This resulted in the Strasbourg Bishops' War (1592–1604), with a dismal effect on Molsheim. In 1618 the Thirty Years' War broke out, ending with the Peace of Westphalia in which control of Molsheim was transferred from the Holy Roman Empire to France.

=== Since 1648 ===
Molsheim was part of the Holy Roman Empire until 1648 (end of the Thirty Years' War and Peace of Westphalia), when it found itself located on the French side of the border. Between 1871 and 1919, the German speaking city was part of the German Reich. Between June 1940 and 1944/45, during World War II, parts of France were occupied and administrated by Nazi Germany.

During Operation Northwind (January 1945), the Wehrmacht unsuccessfully tried an offensive in the region.

== Coat of arms ==
The town's coat of arms features a breaking wheel of gold, in which a nude man with a golden halo is interlaced and bound, against an azure field. The coat of arms is based on a seal of 1263 representing the martyrdom of Saint George.

== Language ==
Historically, several languages have been spoken in the Alsace region (which included Molsheim), depending on what nation or country has claimed this region and whether some language was imposed or, was willingly adopted. The history of Alsace records such power struggles and language swaps. Linguistically speaking, this city is located in what is considered the Northern Low Alemannic zone of the historical region of Alsace. Prior to the intense "francophonization" in that and other regions of France, after World War II, that dialect of Alsatian, which itself is a derivative of the mentioned Low Alemannic German dialect, was spoken by the majority of the inhabitants of Molsheim. Currently, most people in Molsheim can speak French, which is rapidly replacing Alsatian as the latter declines.

== Toponymy ==
It was attested in the form "Mollesheim" (Molles + heim) around 820. (See History of Molsheim). Albert Dauzat and Charles Rostaing did not comment on the origin of the first element, Molles-, they simply associated it with the name of another town, Molring (called "Mollering" around 1304) which would be formed with the surname Moller. Moller might be an alternative spelling of Möller, which, in turn, is a variant of Müller ("miller"). The [r] at the end of Moller would have been assimilated to [s]". Ernest Nègre explains this toponym by the Germanic personal name Mudila + suffix -heim (home, house, small settlement, village) from Proto-Germanic through Old High German. Leon Dominian wrote that the "Alemanni are responsible for the suffix "heim" in Alsace. Towns and villages with names bearing this suffix are restricted to the plain". He also explained that the -ingen suffix is a later Allemannic alternative to -heim, which, in time, shortened to -ing or, was frenchified as -ange.

== Population ==
Historical population
Year	Pop.	±% p.a.
1968	5,739	—
1975	6,649	+2.12%
1982	6,928	+0.59%
1990	7,973	+1.77%
1999	9,335	+1.77%
2007	9,331	−0.01%
2012	9,227	−0.22%
2017	9,312	+0.18%
2023	9,318	+0.01%
Source: INSEE

== Economy ==
At the Mercedes-Benz plant in Molsheim (Mercedes-Benz Custom Tailored Trucks), trucks are converted into special-purpose vehicles: fire trucks, garbage trucks, municipal vehicles (snow plows, sweepers, etc.), military transporters and other heavy-duty transporters such as the Mercedes-Benz Arocs/Actros SLT.

The lighting manufacturer Osram operates a plant in Molsheim.

Molsheim is also the headquarters of Merck subsidiary Millipore S.A.S., which produces laboratory equipment, and of Messier-Bugatti, a subsidiary of Safran (aerospace technology).

In 2005, production of the Bugatti Veyron started in Dorlisheim near Molsheim.

Molsheim station has rail connections to Strasbourg, Sélestat and Épinal.

== See also ==
- Communes of the Bas-Rhin department
- Carthusian monastery of Molsheim
