= Prince-Bishopric of Strasbourg =

Ecclesiastical principality of the Holy Roman Empire

Coordinates: 48°35′4″N 7°44′55″E

Prince-Bishopric of Strasbourg Fìrschtbischofsìtz Strossburi(g) (Alsatian) Fürstbistum Straßburg (German)
- 982–1803
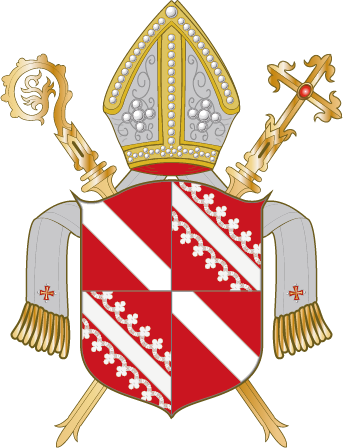
- Flag Coat of arms

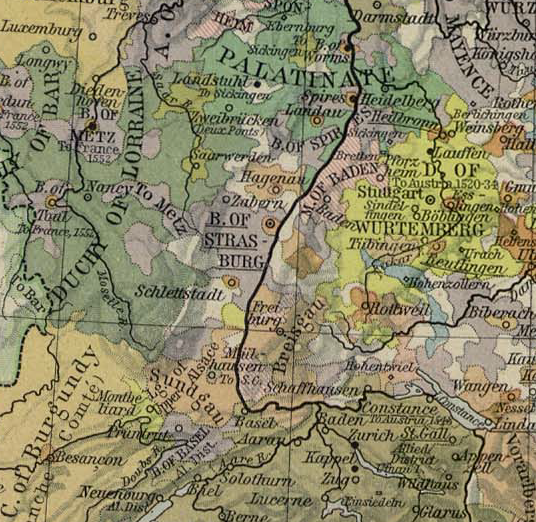
- The Prince-Bishopric of Strasbourg, circa 1547
- Status: Prince-Bishopric
- Capital: Straßburg
- Common languages: Alsatian
- Government: Ecclesiastical principality
- Historical era: Middle Ages
  - Prince-Bishopric founded: before 343
  - Gained autonomy: 775 982
  - Imperial immediacy: 982
  - Left-bank territories annexed by France: 1681
  - Annexation recognised by the Holy Roman Empire: 1697
  - Right-bank territories mediatised to Baden: 1803
Preceded by	Succeeded by
Duchy of Swabia	France in the early modern period; Margraviate of Baden
- Today part of: France; Germany

The Prince-Bishopric of Strasburg (German: Fürstbistum Straßburg; Alsatian: Fìrschtbischofsìtz Strossburi(g)) was an ecclesiastical principality of the Holy Roman Empire from the 13th century until 1803. During the late 17th century, most of its territory was annexed by France; this consisted of the areas on the left bank of the Rhine, around the towns of Saverne, Molsheim, Benfeld, Dachstein, Dambach, Dossenheim-Kochersberg, Erstein, Kästenbolz, Rhinau, and the Mundat (consisting of Rouffach, Soultz, and Eguisheim). The annexations were recognized by the Holy Roman Empire in the Treaty of Ryswick of 1697. Only the part of the state that was to the east of the Rhine remained; it consisted of areas around the towns of Oberkirch, Ettenheim, and Oppenau. This territory was secularized to Baden in 1803.

== See also ==
- Palais Rohan, Strasbourg
- Rohan Castle
- Strasbourg Bishops' War
