= Strasbourg Bishops' War =

Military conflict

- Part of European wars of religion and the Protestant Reformation
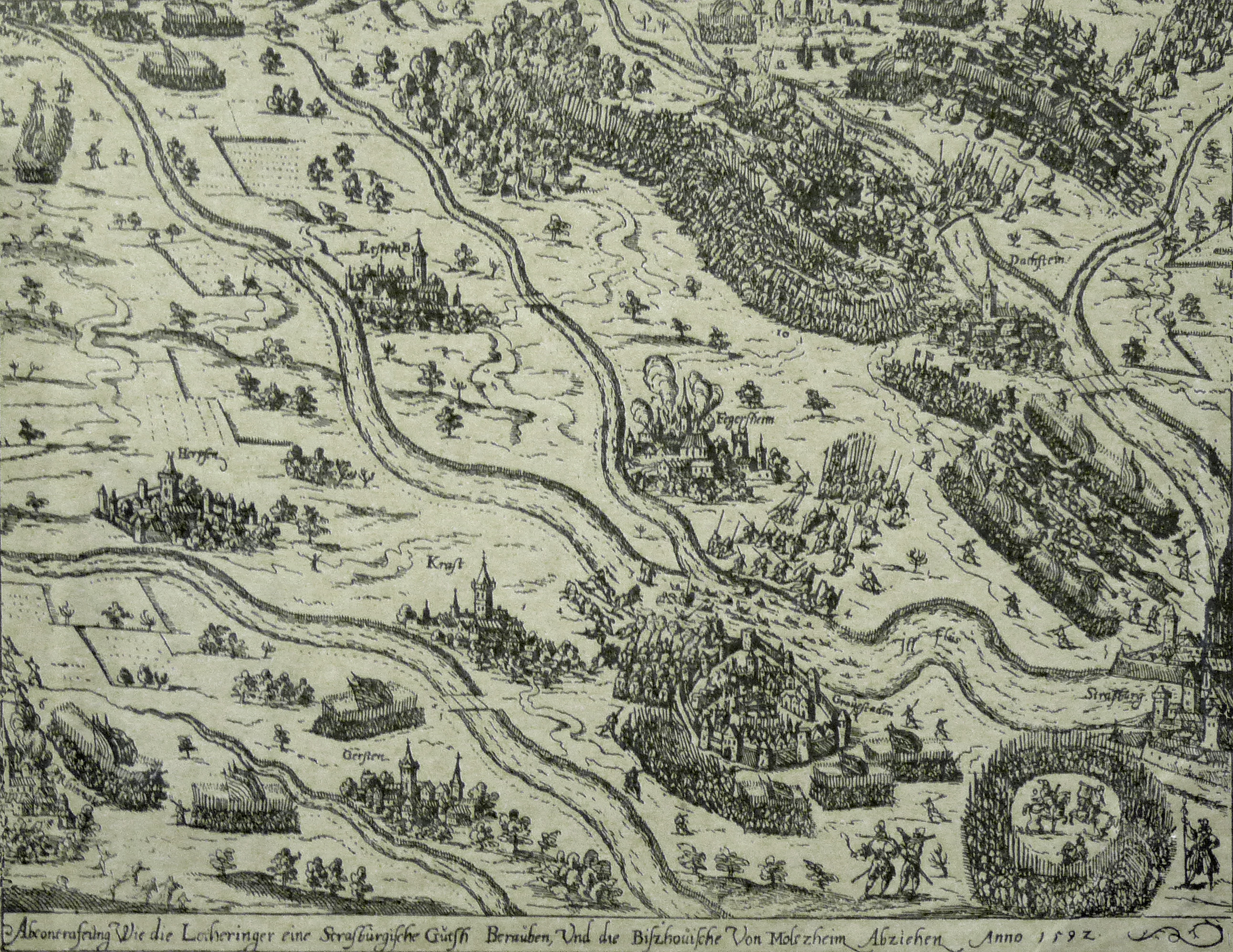
- Etching depicting skirmishes between Dachstein and Molsheim on 2 December 1592.
Date	1592–1604
Location	Prince-Bishopric of Strasbourg

Belligerents
Strasbourg; Württemberg; Anhalt-Bernburg	Lorraine

Commanders and leaders
Frederick I Christian I	Charles III

The Strasbourg Bishops' War (German: Bischöflicher Krieg or Straßburger Kapitelstreit; French: Guerre des Evêques; Alsatian: D'r Bischäflig Kriag) (1592–1604) was a conflict between Catholics and Protestants for control of the Bishopric of Strasbourg. It was one of only two sectarian or confessional conflicts, both highly localised, that occurred within the Holy Roman Empire between the Peace of Augsburg (1555) and the outbreak of the Thirty Years' War (1618). It was less bloody than the Cologne War (1583–88). It coincided with the Counter-Reformation and the Spanish Winter (1598–99), and the Catholic victory caused Protestants in Germany great worry that the tide had turned decidedly against them.

== Background ==
The emergence of the Lutheran and Calvinist doctrines following the Reformation, soon led to the first large scale interdenominational conflict between those new creeds. The Schmalkaldic War ended in 1555 with signing of the Peace of Augsburg. The Free Imperial City of Strasbourg benefited from the treaty by gaining further autonomy, now being able to pursue its own ecclesiastical policies. Strasbourg's status as an important trading hub along with the appeal of its university, attracted radical thinkers from both sides of the religious spectrum including Hans Denck, Girolamo Zanchi, and Michael Servetus to name but a few. However, by the second half of the century the city started leaning towards Lutheranism under the leadership of Johann Marbach, a former doctoral student of Martin Luther. In his capacity as the President of the Company of Pastors, Marbach organized annual visitations to the 14 rural parishes under the city's control. The visitations included meetings during which catechisms were delivered, while the life and beliefs of every parishioner were publicly examined and those not in accord with the official doctrine were admonished.

== Conflict ==
At the start of the war, Strasbourg was a Protestant-majority city and its cathedral chapter comprised twelve Protestants and seven Catholics. The immediate cause of the war was the death of Bishop Johann von Manderscheid and the disputed election to replace him. The Protestants feared the powerful Cardinal Charles of Lorraine, whom the Catholic canons had invited to join the chapter in 1585, and who stood for election as bishop. To hedge against this, the Protestants seized the episcopal offices and held their own election on 20 May to replace Manderscheid. Their choice fell upon the 15-year-old Johann Georg, son of the Elector of Brandenburg, Joachim III Frederick. This decision was designed to unite Protestants across Germany behind them. On this occasion, Johannes Pappus, president of the Compagnie des Pasteurs (Kirchenconvent), delivered a sermon on the "ministry, character and election of a bishop", but only the Protestants were present to hear it. After the election, the Catholic canons had fled to Saverne and there elected Charles bishop in opposition to Johann Georg on 9 June.

At first, the Protestants purchased the support of Duke Frederick I of Württemberg by accepting from him a loan of 300,000 florins. In turn Johann Georg ceded to Württemberg the district of Oberkirch, which connected the duchy to two of its enclaves in Alsace. Frederick's son, Louis Frederick, aged six, was made a canon and promised the succession to Johann Georg.

In the first year of the war, locally raised troops under Christian of Anhalt halted the invasion of Charles of Lorraine. At Saverne, Charles was joined by his 20-year-old brother Francis, who brought with him forty cavalrymen. Charles's war treasury, managed at Paris by his treasurer, Stefano del Poggio, disbursed 15,386 francs during his time at Saverne, and in 1593 another 35,392 francs were spent on military ventures in Alsace.

The reclusive Emperor Rudolph II refused to mediate the conflict, and so Henry IV of France—a Protestant convert to Catholicism—intervened in 1593. In September, he secured the division of the bishopric between the contending prelates: seven districts, including Saverne, went to Charles and six, including Oberkirch, to Johann Georg. Charles felt compelled to apologise to King Philip II of Spain, whose Catholic troops were at that moment fighting the Protestant Dutch, for this compromise. This provisional state persisted until 1604, when the Duke of Württemberg offered to pension Johann Georg and pay off his debts if he would resign the bishopric to Charles. This he did, and in return Charles ceded Oberkirch to Württemberg for a term of thirty years in the Treaty of Haguenau (22 November 1604). The Bishops' War turned out to be less about confessionalism than the dynastic interests of the House of Württemberg.

== Sources ==
- Bornert, René (1981). La réforme protestante du culte à Strasbourg au XVI^{e} siècle (1523–1598): Approche sociologique et interprétation théologique [The Protestant Reformation in Strasbourg in the Sixteenth Century (1523–1598): Sociological Approach and Theological Interpretation] (in French). Leiden: Brill. ISBN 978-9004062641.
- Kittelson, James (1982). "Successes and Failures in the German Reformation: A Report from Strasbourg". Archive for Reformation History. 73: 153–75. doi:10.14315/arg-1982-jg07. S2CID 159870915.
- Monter, William (2007). A Bewitched Duchy: Lorraine and Its Dukes, 1477–1736. Librairie Droz. ISBN 978-2-600-01165-5.
- Wilson, Peter (2011). The Holy Roman Empire, 1495–1806 (2nd ed.). London: Palgrave MacMillan. ISBN 9780230239784.
- Wilson, Peter (2014). The Thirty Years War: Europe's Tragedy. London: Belknap Press. ISBN 978-0674062313.
- Whaley, Joachim (2011). Germany and the Holy Roman Empire, Volume I: Maximilian I to the Peace of Westphalia, 1493–1648. Oxford: Oxford University Press. ISBN 9780198731016.
