= Jesuit Church, Molsheim =

Coordinates: 48°32′25″N 7°29′45″E

- Église paroissiale Sainte-Trinité-et-Saint-Georges; Église des Jésuites
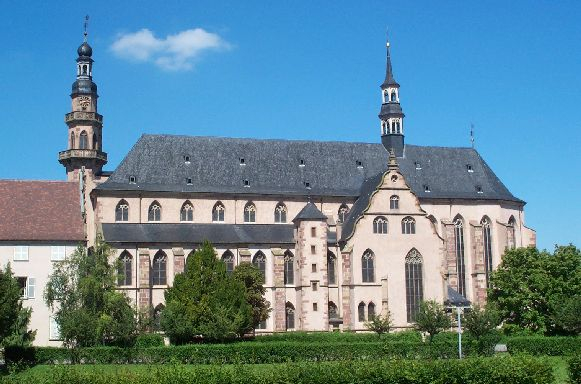
- Jesuit Church, Molsheim
- Location: Molsheim
- Country: France
- Denomination: Roman Catholic

History
- Founded: 1614

Architecture
- Heritage designation: Monument historique
- Designated: 1939
- Architect: Christoph Wamser
- Style: Gothic Revival; Baroque
- Completed: 1618

Specifications
- Length: 70 m (230 ft)

Administration
- Archdiocese: Strasbourg

The former Jesuit Church (Église des Jésuites) is the parish church Sainte-Trinité-et-Saint-Georges (Alsatian: Sànkt-Georg- und Dreifàltigkeitskirich) which is the main Roman Catholic sanctuary of Molsheim, France, and the principal 17th-century church building in the Rhine Valley. The church was built between 1615 and 1617 by the German architect Christoph Wamser, and consecrated on 26 August 1618. Molsheim's Jesuit church is considered one of the foremost examples of Gothic Survival architecture or, as it is called in German, de:Nachgotik (posterior Gothic). It is listed as a Monument historique since 1939 by the French Ministry of Culture.

Molsheim's Jesuit College was founded in 1580 and dissolved in 1765. It served as Alsace's main university between 1618 and 1704, preceding the Lutheran Strasbourg University in importance. The church's construction was funded by the bishop of Strasbourg, Archduke Leopold V of Austria, who made a donation on his name saint's day, 15 November 1614. Although a chapel inside is dedicated to Ignatius of Loyola, the church was dedicated from the start to the Holy Trinity (Heilige Dreifaltigkeit). It became the parish church of Molsheim and was dedicated to Saint-George in 1791, after the demolition of the city's former parish church, the previous Église Saint-Georges, on what is now the town's current market square (Place du marché).

The church's dimensions are considerable, especially in relation to the small size of the town: The interior is 70 m (230 ft) long, and the nave is 25 m (82 ft) wide and 20 m (66 ft) high. The choir measuring 19.5 m (64 ft) by 11 m (36 ft), the spire 45 m (148 ft) high. The total length of the church, steeple and sacristy included, is 82.5 m (271 ft)^{[A]}

Among the many features inside the richly ornate building, the Baroque Saint Ignatius' Chapel (1621–1630) in the north transept and the Rococo Our Lady's Chapel (1748) in the south transept stand out as the most visually striking. Another pride of the church are the 1781 pipe organ by Johann Andreas Silbermann and the monumental Late Gothic cross (1480), 4.5 m (15 ft) high and 2.5 m (8 ft 2 in) wide, from the former Carthusian monastery of the town.

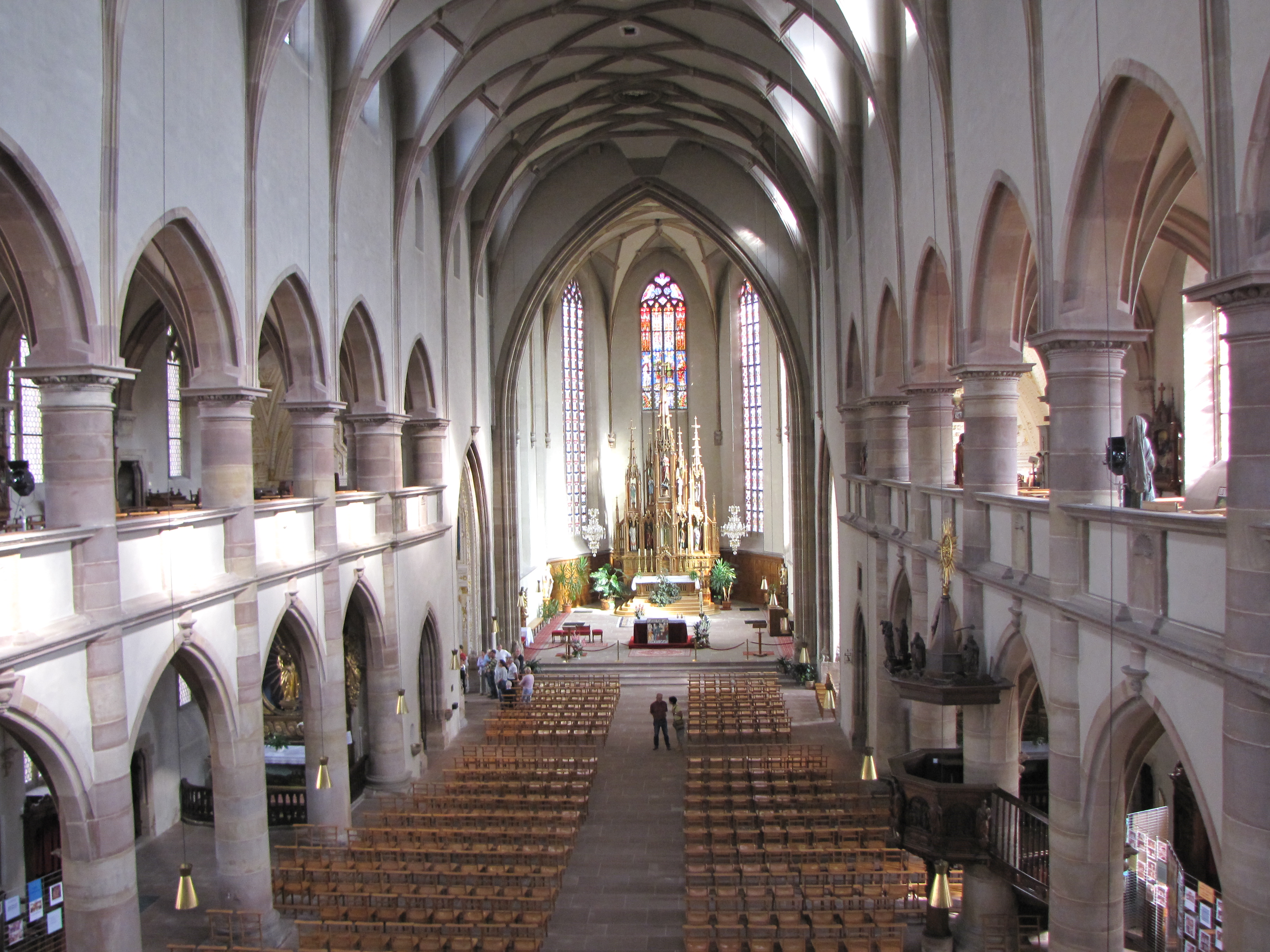
The nave looking towards the choir

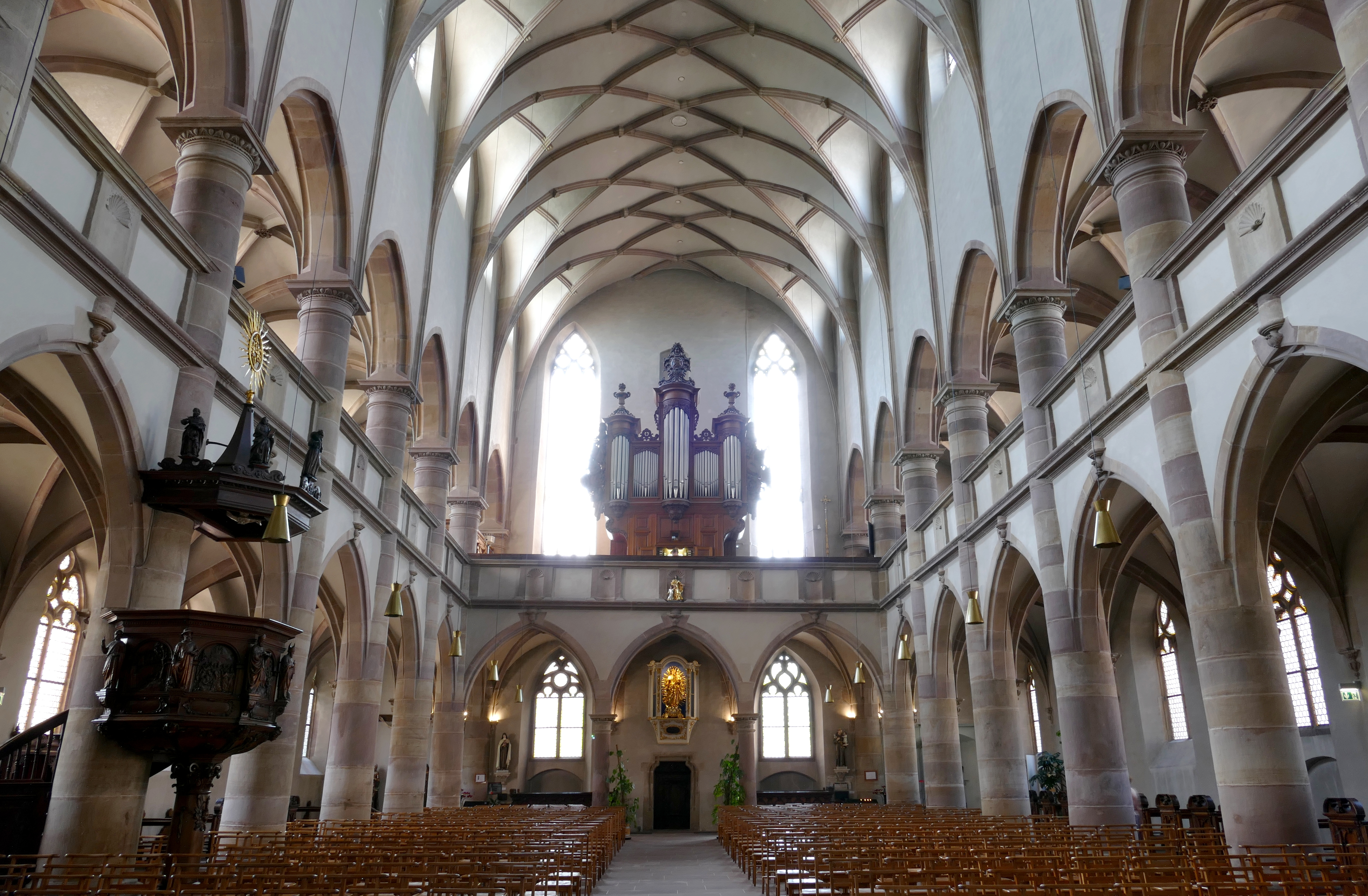
The nave looking towards the pipe organ

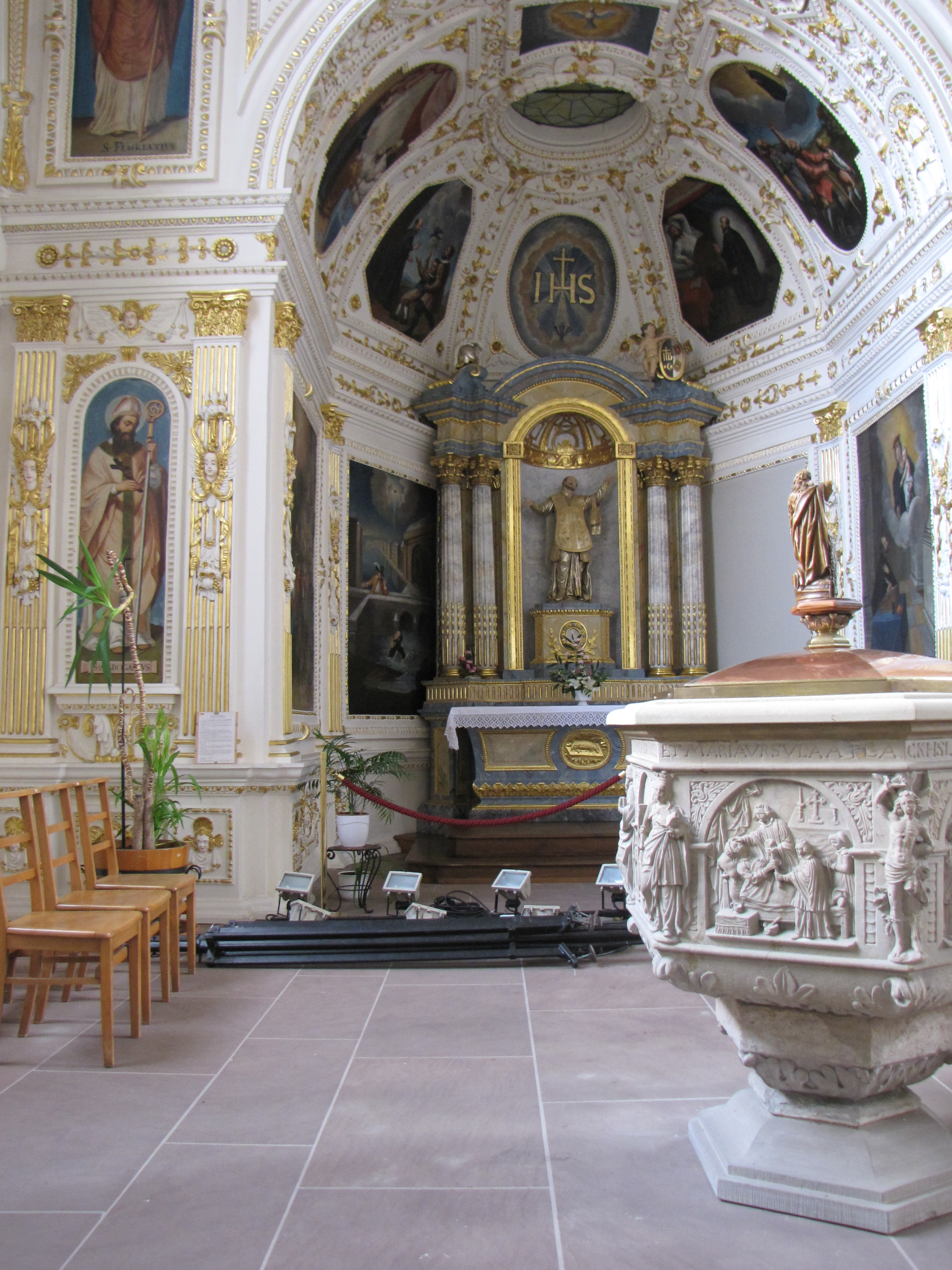
Saint Ignatius chapel with baptismal font

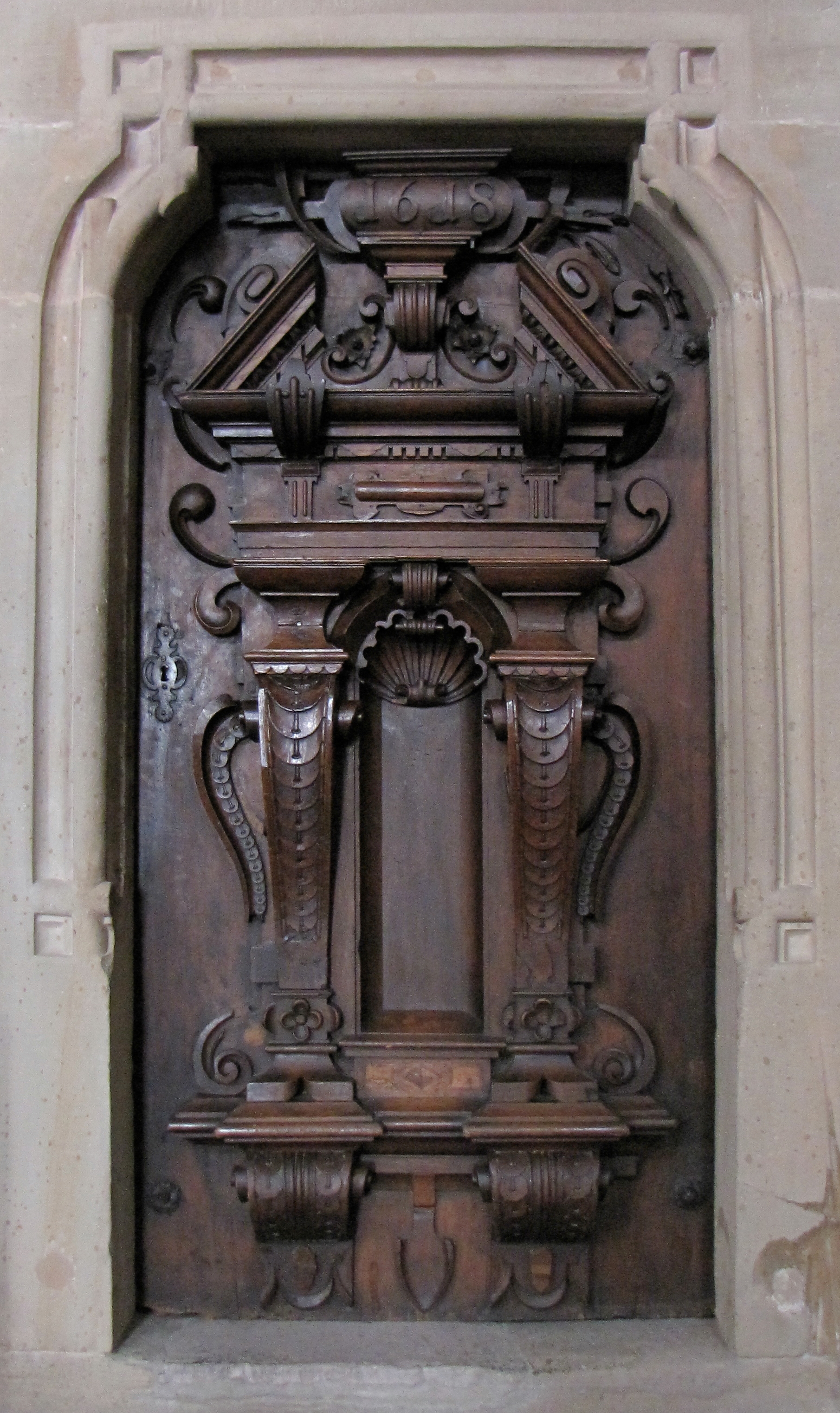
Wooden Renaissance door

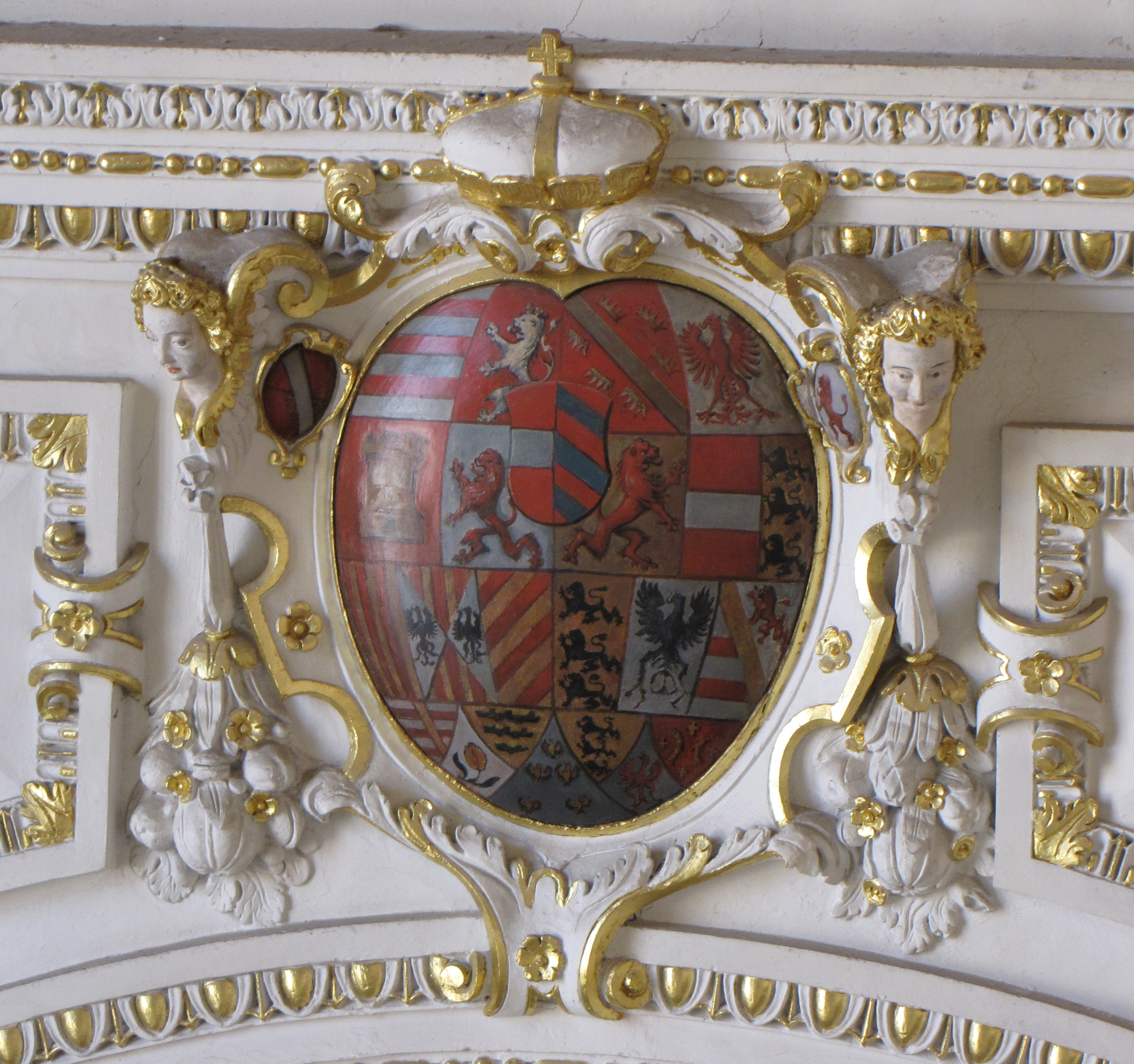
Coat of Arms of Leopold of Austria

== See also ==
- List of Jesuit sites

== Notes ==
^{A} The numbers of 61.5 m (202 ft) (length), and 21.5 m (71 ft) (width), that are given since 1964 (author Médard Barth), and repeated in 2002 (Smith) and even 2015 (Oswald, page 5), are wrong. According to the floor plan with a scale of 2 cm (0.79 in) per 10 m (33 ft), the dimensions are decidedly higher.
