= Château Hervé =

Château in Bas-Rhin, Alsace, France

Coordinates: 48°33′38″N 7°31′59″E

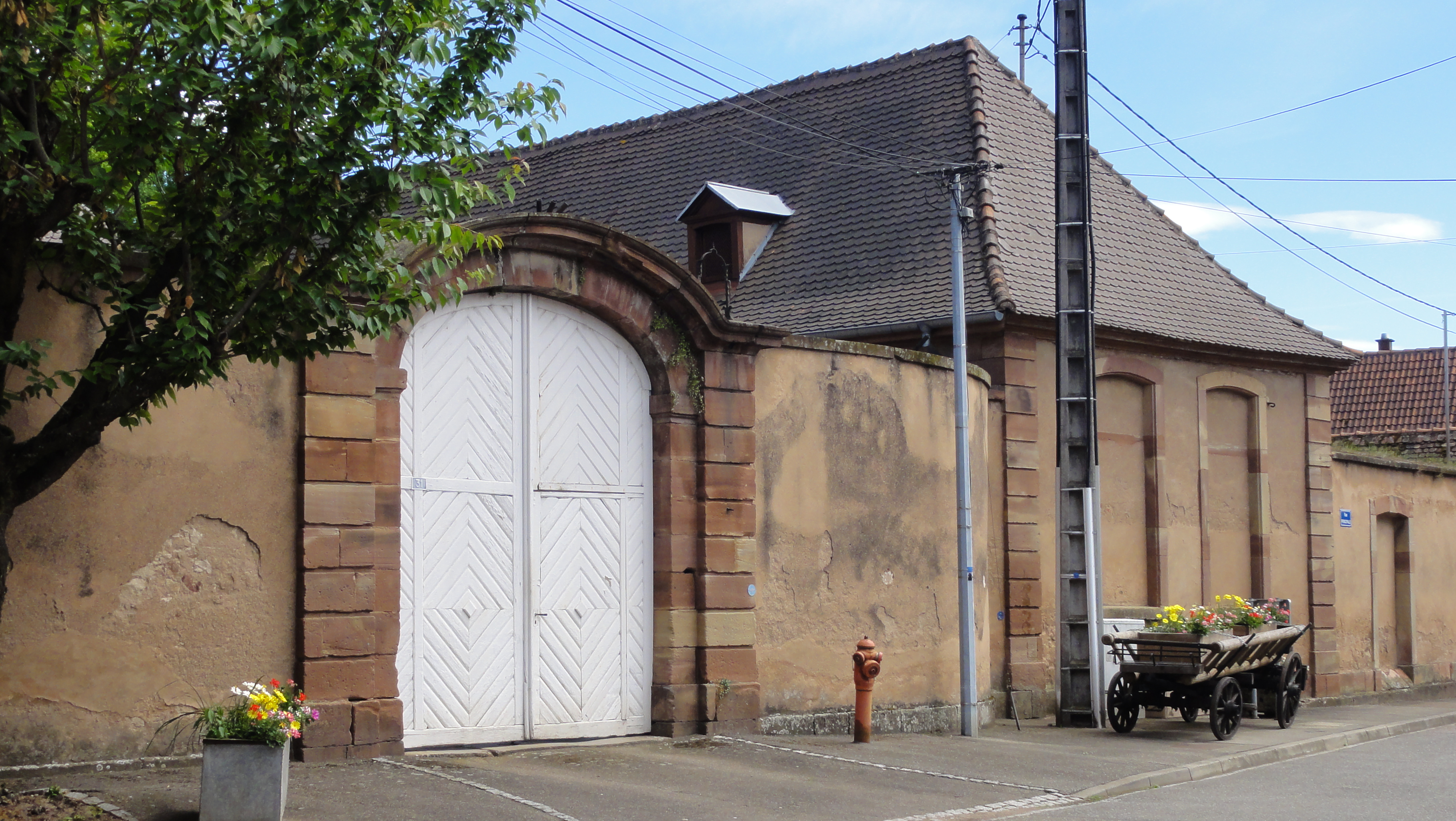
Hervé Castle

Château Hervé is a château in the commune of Dachstein, in the department of Bas-Rhin, Alsace, France. It became a Monument historique on 1 October 1986.
