= Charles of Lorraine (bishop of Metz and Strasbourg) =

Roman Catholic Bishop of Metz and Strasbourg (1567–1607)

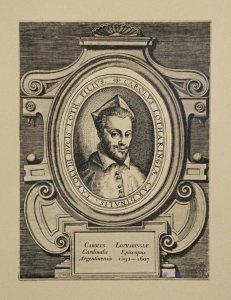
- Diocese: Metz
- Appointed: 18 July 1578
- Term ended: 24 November 1607
- Other posts: Bishop of Strasbourg 1592–1607; Cardinal-deacon of Sant'Agata de' Goti 1591–1607

Orders
- Created cardinal: 20 December 1589 by Pope Sixtus V
- Rank: Cardinal-deacon

Personal details
- Born: 1 July 1567 Nancy, France
- Died: 24 November 1607 (aged 40) Nancy, France

Charles of Lorraine (1 July 1567 – 24 November 1607) was the Roman Catholic Bishop of Metz (from 18 July 1578) and Strasbourg (from 1 July 1592). Pope Sixtus V made him a cardinal-deacon in 1589, and in 1591 gave him the titular church of Sant'Agata dei Goti. He regularly served as stadtholder (regent) for his father in the duchies of Lorraine and Bar.

Charles was born at Nancy, the capital of Lorraine. He was the second son of Duke Charles III and Claude de France, daughter of King Henry II. He was the nephew of Cardinal Charles de Lorraine de Vaudémont.

He studied at the University of Pont-à-Mousson, which his father had founded, and at the University of Trier before moving to the Sorbonne in Paris.

Charles was marked out for a career in the church. He was appointed bishop while still a child. He received canonries in the cathedrals of Trier, Cologne, Mainz and Strasbourg. He was also elected abbot of the abbeys of Gorze, Clairlieu, Saint-Mihiel, Saint-Vincent in Metz and Saint-Victor in Paris.

As bishop of Metz, Charles instituted the Tridentine reforms with the help of the Society of Jesus. He presided over a diocesan synod in 1588, whereat the Minims and Capuchins were established in Metz. On 23 June 1591 he was appointed apostolic legate for the "Three Bishoprics" (Metz, Verdun and Toul) that fell under French rule.

In 1592, there was a disputed episcopal election in the diocese of Strasbourg. The local Protestants chose Johann Georg von Brandenburg, while the Catholic canons fled to Saverne. There, on 9 June, they elected Charles, one of their own since 1585, as bishop in opposition to Georg. The result was a war between the rival factions that lasted until 1604. On 1 July Pope Clement VIII confirmed Charles as administrator of the diocese of Strasbourg.

At Saverne, Charles was joined by his 20-year-old brother Francis, who brought with him forty cavalrymen. During his time at Saverne, raising troops for war, his treasury, managed at Paris by Stefano del Poggio, disbursed 15,386 francs. His first invasion, in 1592, was stopped by Protestant forces under Christian of Anhalt. In 1593, he spent another 35,392 francs on a military campaign in Alsace. In September 1593, through the mediation of King Henry IV of France, the bishopric was divided between the contending prelates: seven districts, including Saverne, went to Charles. This division persisted until 1604, when Georg ceded his rights to Charles, who became sole bishop.

In 1596, following the example of Charles Borromeo, Charles made his first pastoral visit to Strasbourg. In 1597 he oversaw the production of a new missal for the Catholic clergy. In 1597 he founded a Jesuit novitiate in Nancy. He promoted the pilgrimage sites of Mont Sainte-Odile and Marienthal Priory in Haguenau. In 1603 Charles was confirmed by Clement VIII as the primate of Lorraine with his seat and primatial church in Nancy. Following the end of the war in 1604, Charles held a diocesan synod in 1605.

Charles died at Nancy and was buried in the primatial church, today the cathedral.

== Sources ==
- Bornert, René (1981). La réforme protestante du culte à Strasbourg au XVI^{e} siècle (1523–1598): Approche sociologique et interprétation théologique [The Protestant Reformation in Strasbourg in the Sixteenth Century (1523–1598): Sociological Approach and Theological Interpretation] (in French). Leiden: Brill. ISBN 978-9004062641.
- Monter, William (2007). A Bewitched Duchy: Lorraine and Its Dukes, 1477–1736. Librairie Droz. ISBN 978-2-600-01165-5.
- Wilson, Peter (2014). The Thirty Years War: Europe's Tragedy. London: Belknap Press. ISBN 978-0674062313.
