= Johann Georg von Brandenburg =

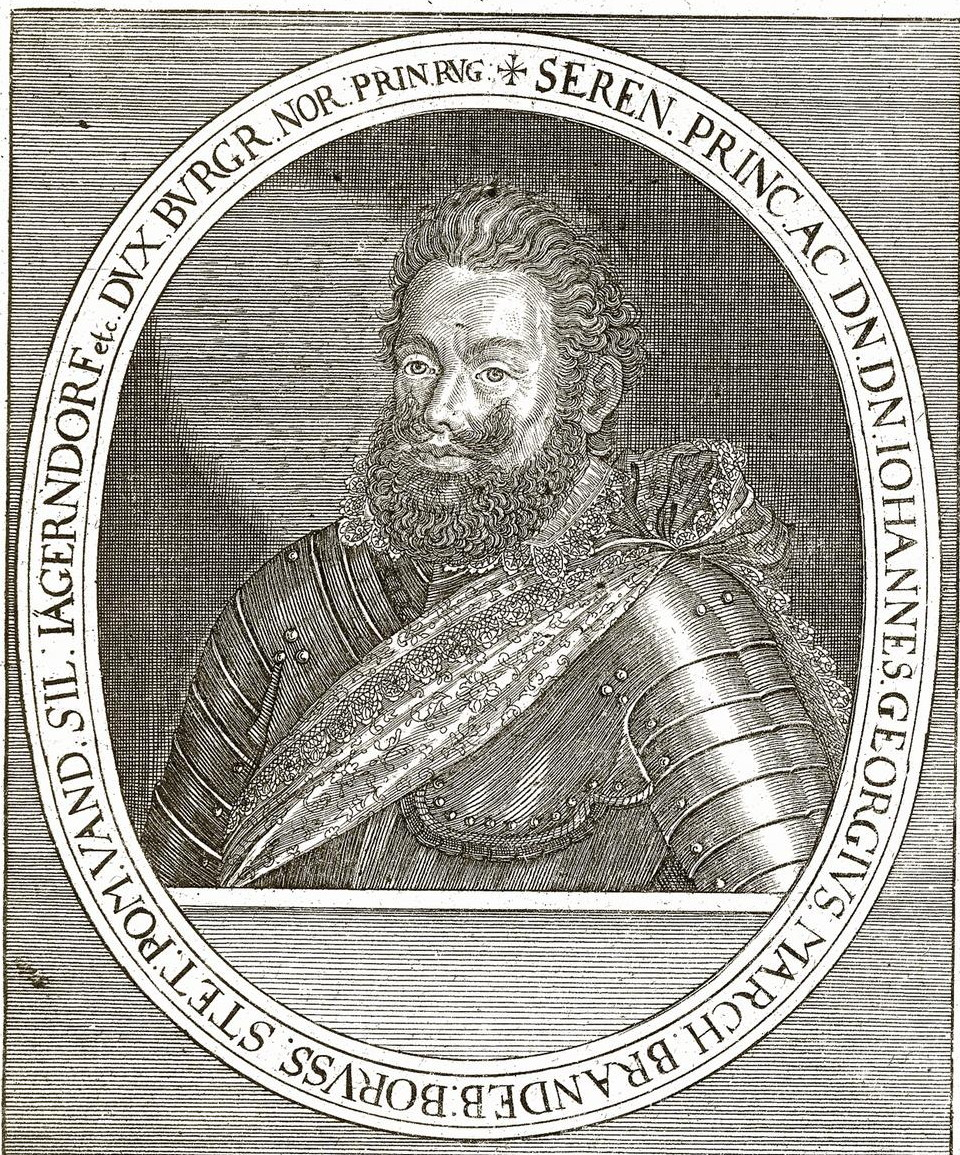
An engraving of Johann Georg by Matthäus Merian (1662)

Johann Georg [John George] von Brandenburg (16 December 1577 – 2 March 1624) was a German nobleman and Protestant ecclesiastic in the Holy Roman Empire. He was the administrator (bishop) of Strasbourg from 1592 until 1604 and the Duke of Jägerndorf (Krnov), one of the Silesian duchies, from 1607 until 1624.

Born at Wolmirstedt, Johann Georg was the second son of Elector Joachim Friedrich of Brandenburg and Katharina von Brandenburg-Küstrin. Like all male members of his family, he held the title Margrave of Brandenburg as a courtesy title. With his brother Johann Sigismund, he was sent to study at the University of Strasbourg in 1588. There the brothers, both Lutherans, came under the influence of Calvinist teaching.

Following the death of Bishop Johann von Manderscheid, the Protestant majority in the chapter of the diocese of Strasbourg elected the 15-year-old Johann Georg to administer the diocese on 20 May 1592. This decision was designed to unite Protestants across Germany behind them. The Catholic minority elected Cardinal Charles of Lorraine in opposition to Johann. There followed twelve years' of war in Strasbourg. It was finally ended by the Treaty of Haguenau of 22 November 1604. Johann ceded the diocese to Charles and received compensation in return.

In 1607, Johann Georg's father granted him the Duchy of Jägerndorf, which had belonged to the late Georg Friedrich of Ansbach. The Emperor Rudolf II, in whose Kingdom of Bohemia the Duchy of Jägerndorf lay, refused to admit Johann as duke and asked for Beuthen and Oderberg as pledges. His successors, Matthias and Ferdinand II, however, took the oath of fealty from Johann in 1611 and 1617. A dispute over the pledges was not settled until 17 May 1618, and on that date Johann's possession of Jägerndorf became final.

Johann Georg was one of the five Protestant members of the Silesian estates who joined with the Bohemian estates in demanding religious tolerance from Rudolf II on 25 June 1609. The Silesians received the Letter of Majesty, granting the request, on 20 August. When the Thirty Years' War broke out in 1618, the Silesian estates joined the Bohemian in opposing the Emperor Ferdinand II. Although Johann played a relatively minor role in the military actions of the first few years, he was the only Silesian or Bohemian nobleman deposed by the victorious Ferdinand after the Battle of the White Mountain (29 January 1621). He refused to accept his deposition and continued to fight with an army of mercenaries in the Neisse and Glatzer regions. He joined with the Transylvanian prince Gabriel Bethlen, elected King of Hungary in opposition to Ferdinand, and was instrumental in his military success in 1621. In January 1622, however, he made peace with the emperor at Nikolsburg. He remained with Gabriel Bethlen, expecting war to break out again, but died in Levoča in Hungary before it did.

== Sources ==
- Hirsch, Theodor (1881). "Johann Georg". Allgemeine Deutsche Biographie. Vol. 14. pp. 175–76.
- Wilson, Peter (2014). The Thirty Years War: Europe's Tragedy. London: Belknap Press. ISBN 978-0674062313.
