= Dachstein, Bas-Rhin =

Dachstein Dàchstaan
- Commune
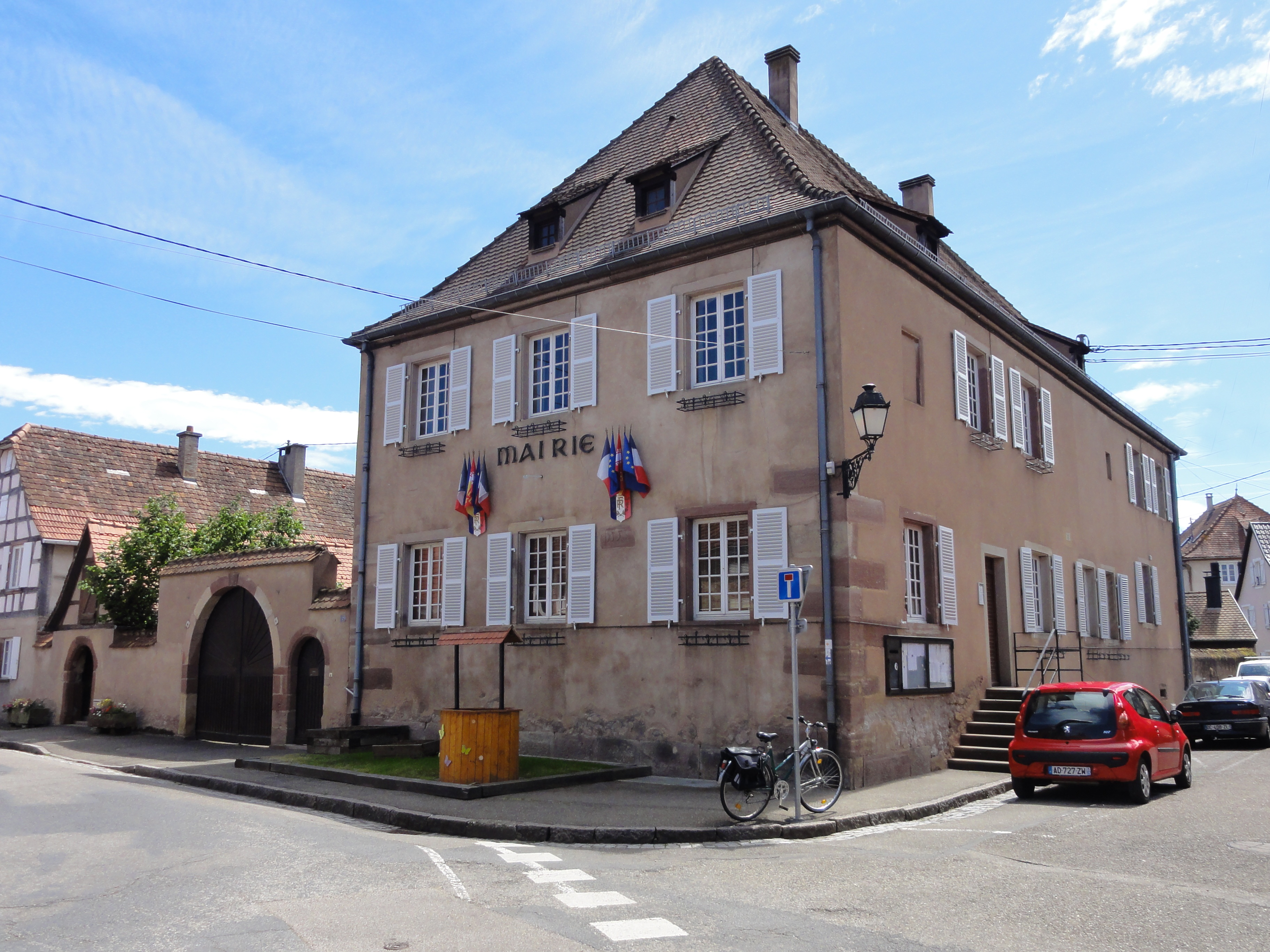
- The town hall in Dachstein

- Coat of arms
- Location of Dachstein
- Location within France Location within Grand Est
- Coordinates: 48°33′42″N 7°31′58″E
- Country: France
- Region: Grand Est
- Department: Bas-Rhin
- Arrondissement: Molsheim
- Canton: Molsheim
- Intercommunality: Région de Molsheim-Mutzig

Government
  - Mayor (2022–2026): Laetitia Martz
- Area^{1}: 7.46 km^{2} (2.88 sq mi)
- Highest elevation: 170 m (560 ft)
- Lowest elevation: 159 m (522 ft)
- Population (2023): 1,737
  - Density: 233/km^{2} (603/sq mi)
- Time zone: UTC+01:00 (CET)
  - Summer (DST): UTC+02:00 (CEST)
- INSEE/Postal code: 67080 /67120
- ^{1} French Land Register data, which excludes lakes, ponds, glaciers > 1 km^{2} (0.386 sq mi or 247 acres) and river estuaries.

Dachstein is a commune in the Bas-Rhin department in Grand Est in north-eastern France. Of note is Château Hervé. Dachstein station has rail connections to Strasbourg and Molsheim.

== Population ==
Historical population
Year	Pop.	±% p.a.
1968	788	—
1975	952	+2.74%
1982	936	−0.24%
1990	957	+0.28%
1999	1,271	+3.20%
2007	1,485	+1.96%
2012	1,702	+2.77%
2017	1,802	+1.15%
2023	1,737	−0.61%
Source: INSEE

== See also ==
- Communes of the Bas-Rhin department
