= Buxheim choir stalls =

High baroque choir stalls

The Buxheim choir stalls are high baroque choir stalls created by Ignaz Waibl between 1687 and 1691 in the monastery church of St. Maria in Buxheim in Upper Swabia. Following the dissolution of the charterhouse in the course of secularization, it came into the possession of the count in 1803. Count Hugo Waldbott von Bassenheim had it auctioned off in Munich in 1883. When the chair came under the hammer again in 1886, the director of the Bank of England bought it at auction and donated it to the Sisters of St. Saviour's Hospital in London, England, who took it with them when the hospital was moved to Hythe in the county of Kent. When the hospital in Kent was dissolved, the choir stalls were bought back by the county of Swabia in 1980 for 450,000 pounds sterling, which is roughly equivalent to a price of 1.05 million euros. It was extensively restored between 1980 and 1994 and has since been returned to its original location in the former charterhouse in Buxheim.

The stalls are horseshoe-shaped and originally consisted of 36 stalls, 31 of which are still preserved. The main part of the rich figurative decoration is formed by the statues of the founders of religious orders in the backs of the seats, the dorsals, with the emphasis on orders of hermits. The cornice is dominated by sculptures of the twelve apostles.

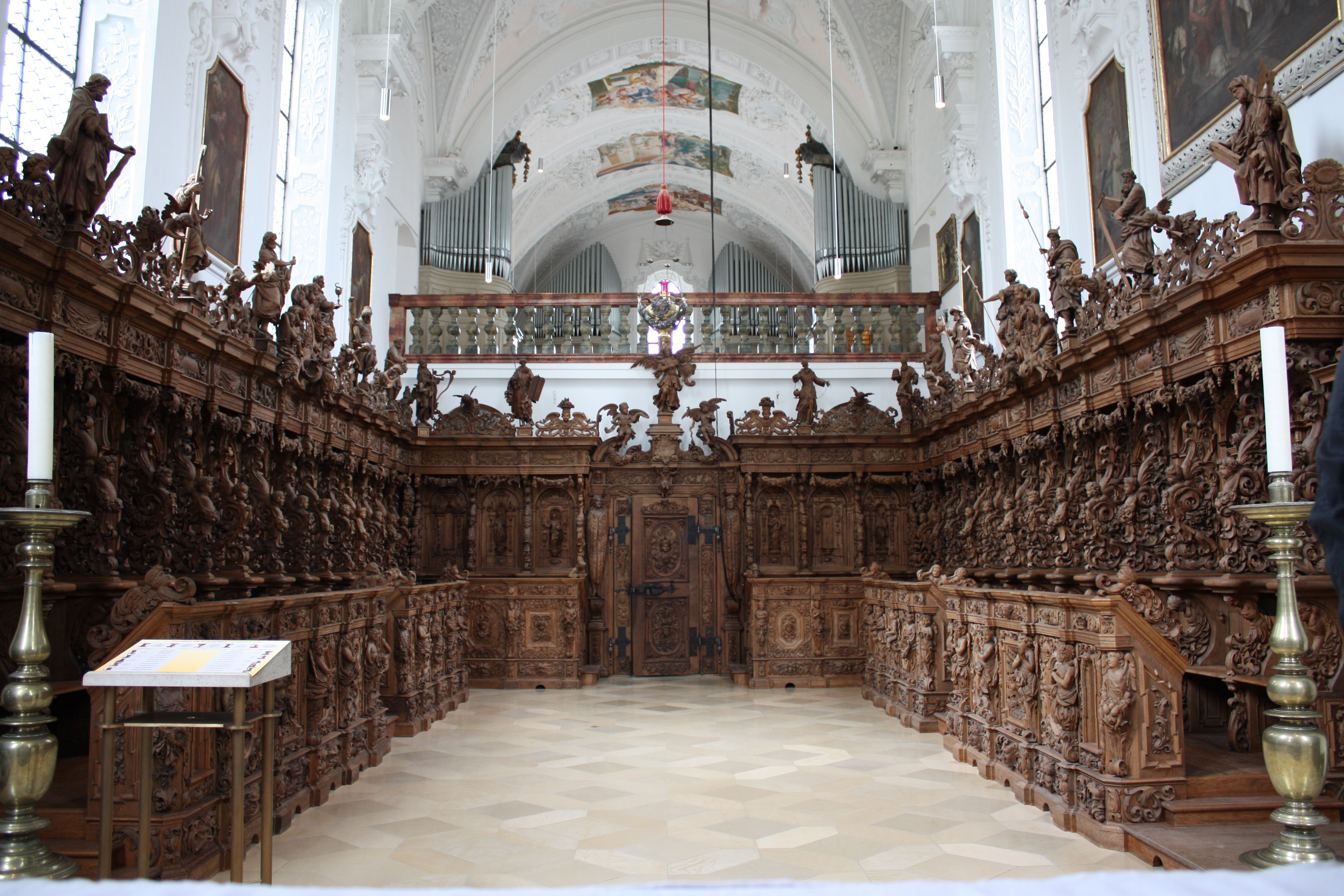
The choir stalls in the priests' choir of the monastery church of St. Maria in Buxheim

== History ==
=== Previous history ===
The predecessor of Ignaz Waibl's choir stalls was relatively simple in design, comparable to the stalls that can still be seen in the former Christgarten Charterhouse. There is no evidence of pre-baroque stalls. As part of the renovation of the Charterhouse church, the then Prior Johannes Bilstein commissioned the construction of new choir stalls, which began in 1687. Bilstein was one of the most important priors in Buxheim. He was born in Cologne around 1626 and made his profession in Danzig on July 22, 1648, where he initially worked as a vicar. Before becoming prior in Buxheim in 1678, he was head of the Charterhouse in Schnals in Tyrol (1661–1670) and the Charterhouse Karthaus near Danzig (1670–1678). At the same time, he became acquainted with numerous charterhouses as a visitator and visitator. In addition to the Lower German province, he also traveled to the Upper German province, to Austria and Bohemia and to the Spanish provinces of Catalonia and Castile. Inspired by the impressions he had gathered on his many travels, he had a choir stall made in Danzig, which became an extremely artistic masterpiece of interior architecture. The stalls, completed in 1677, are carved from oak wood and have a wealth of figures and ornamentation never before seen in Kartausen. In addition to Italian influences, the stalls of the canons' monastery in Sitten in Switzerland are worth mentioning, where Bilstein had admired the cheeks with plant decoration and angel heads and had them similarly realized in Gdansk. The Buxheim choir stalls are therefore the second stalls to have been made under the direction of Johannes Bilstein. Similarities with the Gdansk stalls cannot be overlooked.

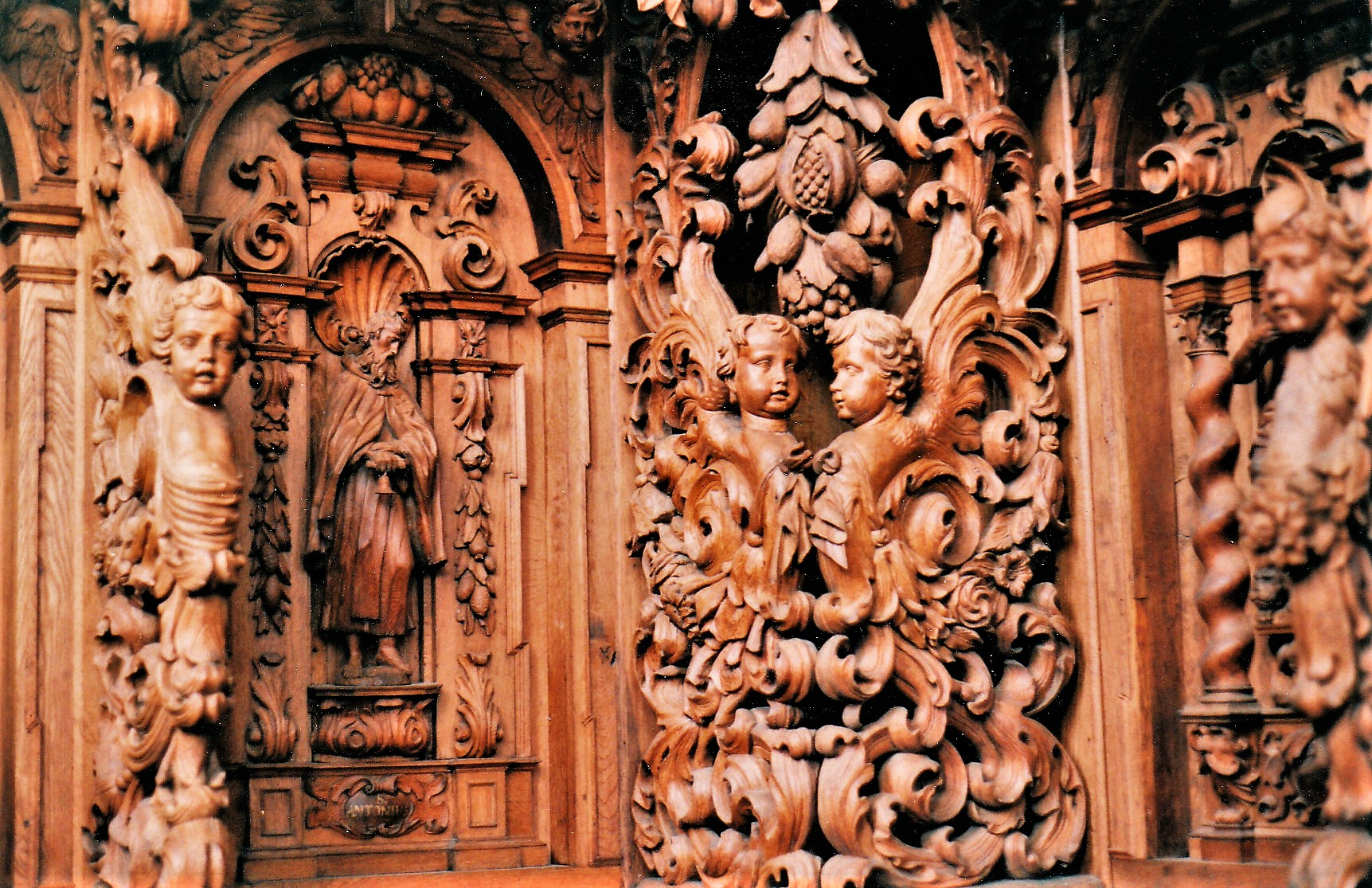
Northwest corner in the Hochwangen area

=== Creation of the choir stalls by Ignaz Waibl ===
The prior commissioned the Tyrolean sculptor Ignaz Waibl to sculpt the new choir stalls and Master Peter from Memmingen to do the carpentry work. This master appears in the monastery archives as Master Peter, the carpenter from the town, but is not listed in any of the surviving Memmingen archives. It is therefore assumed that the master carpenter came from a village not far from the town of Memmingen. It is not known why Bilstein chose Ignaz Waibl. Whether the designs for the choir stalls were made by Waibl himself can only be assumed; the iconographic program was specified by the Carthusians.

The sculptor set up a workshop for himself and his assistants in the Charterhouse. Due to varying quality, research assumes that there were around five to seven figure carvers and several journeymen who were responsible for the foliage. Johann Georg Dettelbacher from Ochsenfurt is the only one of them whose name has been confirmed. Prior Bilstein's manual mentions the names of two other sculptors, Joseph and Johannes, who are not known in detail. Privately and professionally, Waibl was associated with the Tyrolean sculptor Andreas Etschmann. It is conceivable that the two worked together first in Buxheim and then in Rot an der Rot. The start of the work can be dated to the fall of 1687 on the basis of invoices. In the previous years, Prior Petrus von Schneit had already felled around 200 oak trees in the monastery's own forests and had the wood stored. The fact that seasoned wood was used for the stalls is particularly evident from the shrinkage cracks, which were cut out during processing and have not changed since.

The first two stalls were completed in February 1688 and were paid for on February 11 with 121 guilders. The name Ignaz Waibl appears on the invoice in connection with the choir stalls for the first time in the Buxheim archives. Master carpenter Peter was paid 80 guilders for the two chairs, and further chairs were paid to him in July and November 1689. The invoice in November states that the carpenters worked on the 15 chairs for one year and eight months. Ignaz Waibl was paid 730 guilders for this work. The stalls with 36 stalls, 15 each on the north and south sides of the choir and 6 on the west side in front of the cloister chancel, were completed in 1691. Waibl received the final payment in May, and in October of the same year he carved the portal of the stalls, which earned him a further 75 guilders. Master carpenter Peter also received the final payment in 1691. In the same year, master locksmith Georg Eberhard the Younger from Memmingen made the lock, the fittings and the door hinges for the portal and was paid 60 guilders for his work. On April 17, Johann Friedrich Sichelbein was paid 7 guilders and 12 kreuzer for gilding and setting the hinges.

The celebrant's seat, also known as the prior's chair, which was intended for the celebrating priest, was made by Ignaz Waibl between 1699 and 1700. The seat was placed on the south side of the choir stalls.

=== Reconstruction after the baroqueization of the church ===
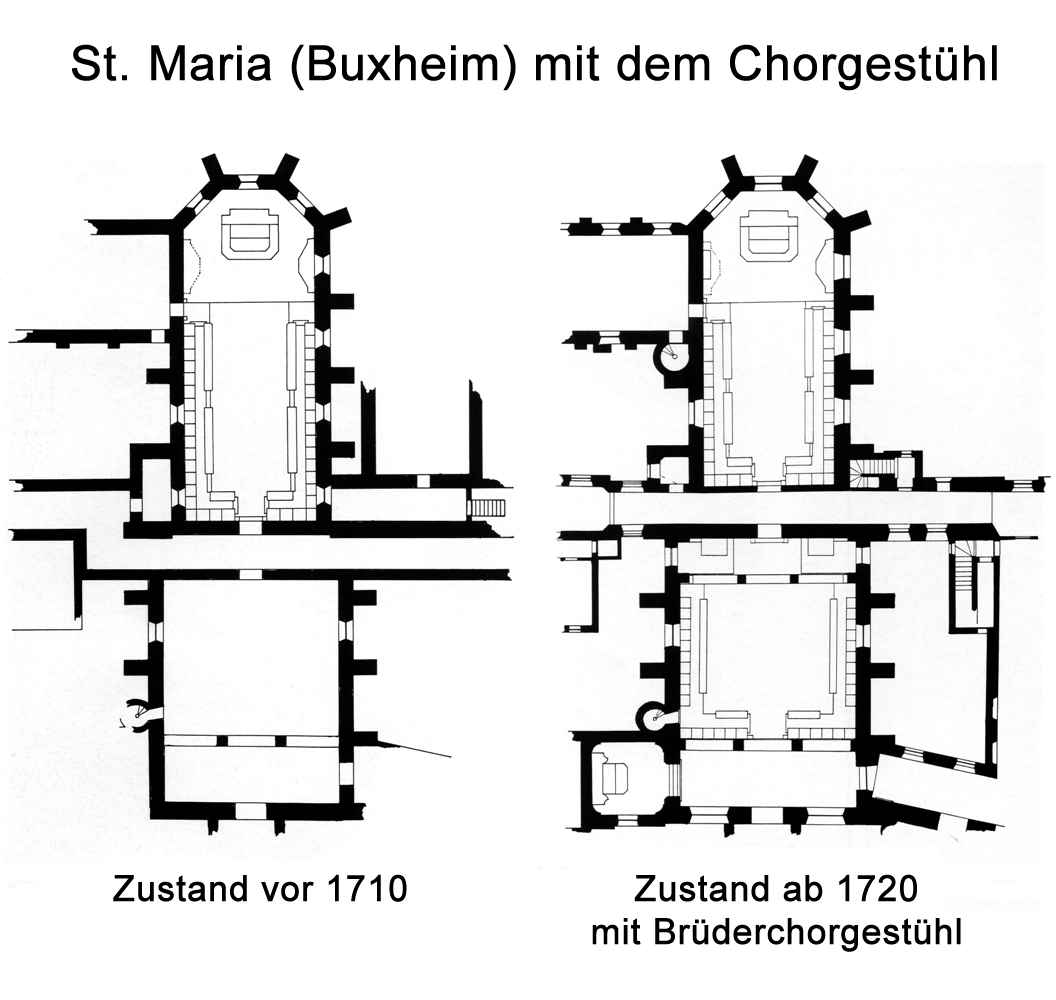
The choir stalls before 1710 and after the baroqueization of the monastery church of St. Maria in 1720

The baroque remodeling of the church necessitated the first change to the choir stalls. Johann Baptist and Dominikus Zimmermann were commissioned to baroqueize the entire monastery church. The stalls had to be dismantled and stored in 1709 for the renovation work. The gothic cloister baptistery was moved around 2.4 meters to the east, which resulted in a shortening of the priest's choir and thus the choir stalls. During the reconstruction, a total of five stalls and the associated lecterns were removed, the north side was reduced to twelve stalls and the south side to thirteen. As a result, the symmetry in the architectural structure of the dorsal fields between the north and south sides was lost, which is still present in the choir stalls in Ittingen Charterhouse, which is a successor to the Buxheim stalls. Nothing is known about the sculptures on these five stalls.

Before the renovation, the monks had to descend two steps to enter the priests' choir. This height difference of around 27 centimetres was removed during the baroqueization by lowering the cloister. The portal had to be lowered by the same amount, which led to the loss of the harmonious connection between the portal and the stalls created by Waibl. Nothing is known about further alterations, but it can be assumed that only minor repairs were made to the stalls at a later date.

=== Change of ownership through secularization, auctions and donations ===
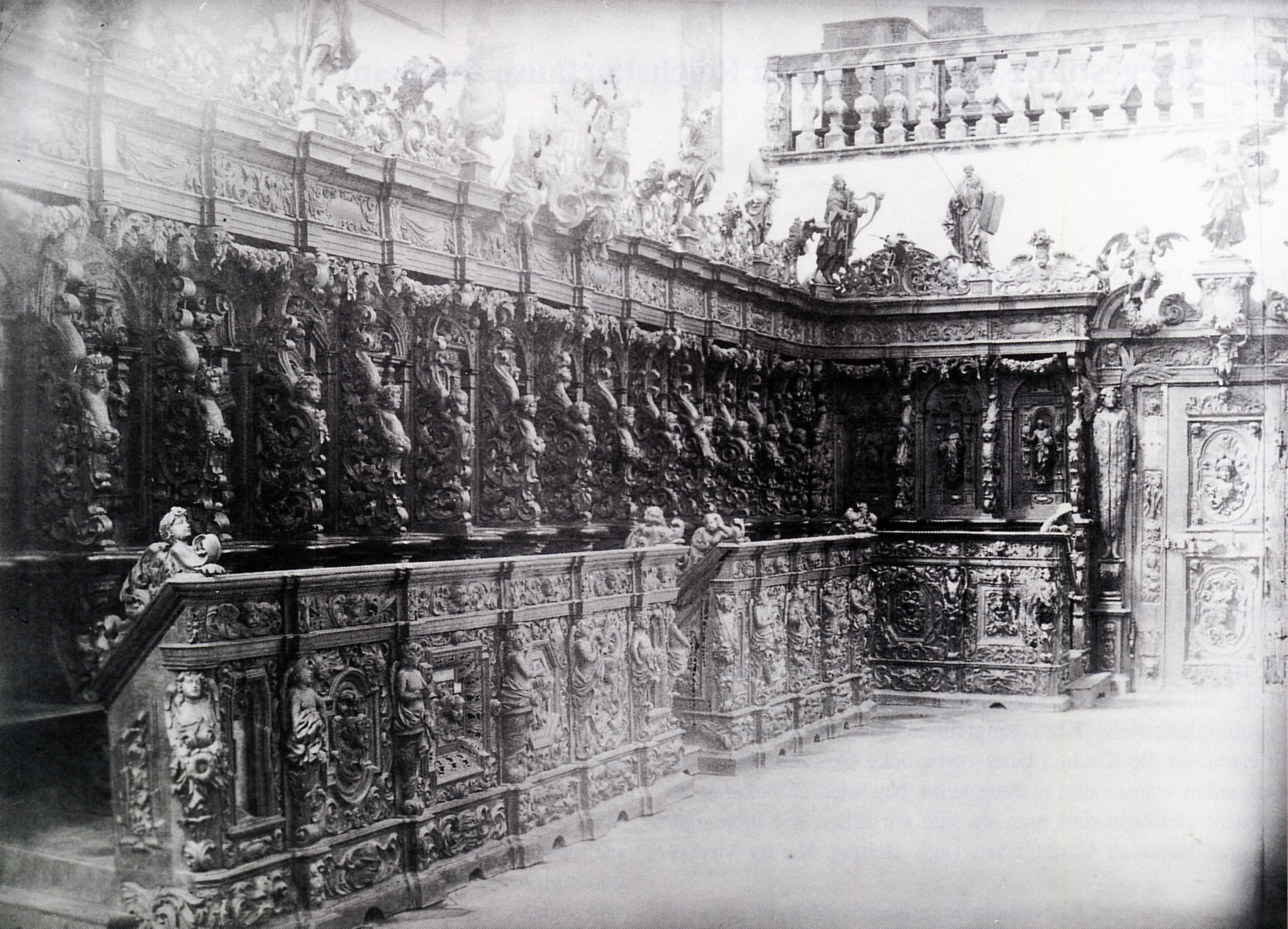
The south side around 1883

Due to secularization, Buxheim came into the possession of Count Maximilian von Ostein in 1803, who initially tolerated the Carthusians. After his death in 1809, the former Imperial Charterhouse became the property of the Counts Waldbott von Bassenheim. They dissolved the convent in April 1812. With the death of Count Friedrich Karl Waldbott von Bassenheim, the church became a crypt church in 1830. As his son Count Hugo Philipp Waldbott cultivated a lavish lifestyle, he began to sell off the charterhouse property from 1850. The first plans to sell the choir stalls are documented for the year 1882. Count Hugo Philipp offered it for sale to the Bavarian Trade Museum in Nuremberg. The people in charge there asked for photographs of the stalls. Count Hugo Philipp had several photographs taken and sent them to the museum. A sale did not materialize.

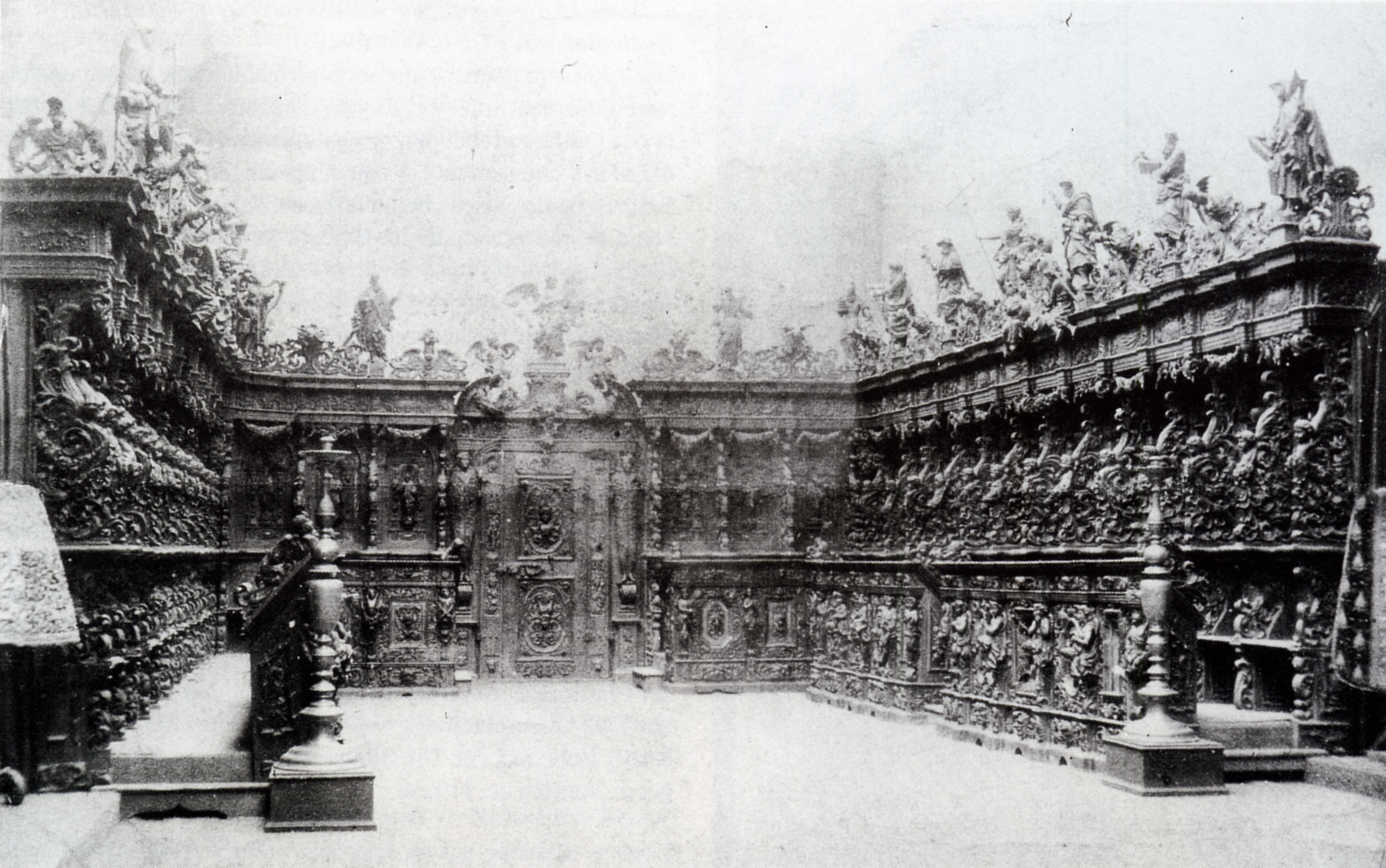
Presumably set up in Amsterdam, early 1886

The Count's entire estate was seized by the court on May 2, 1883. This meant that a forced sale was imminent, which would also have affected the stalls in the priests' choir. To prevent this, Count Hugo Philipp decided to auction off almost all of the former monastery property that could be sold. In addition to the stalls of the priests' choir, the stalls of the brothers' choir, the library with its 16,680 books, altars, paintings and silver objects were offered for sale. The items arrived in Munich on June 23, 1883. The auction of the choir stalls took place on September 14, 1883, but at 42,100 marks, the proceeds were nowhere near what had been hoped for. The celebrant's seat remained in the church. Only the seating furniture of the celebrant's seat, the so-called Hockerl, went under the hammer for 700 marks. The choir stalls were sold to the Dutch dealership Gebrüder Adelaar in Amsterdam and initially went to Brussels. Investigations into where it had been kept were unsuccessful. It is possible that the choir stalls were intended for an exhibition in Amsterdam. A photograph of the stalls was taken in February/March 1886, which the Archbishop's Museum in Utrecht sent to the State Office for the Preservation of Monuments in 1938. There is no archival evidence of an installation in Holland.

The chair reappeared in London in 1886. In August of the same year, it was offered in The Times as an auction item at Bonhams. On September 1, 1886, Edward Howley Palmer, the director of the Bank of England, bought the choir stalls at auction for 3500 pounds and donated them to the Sisters of St. Saviour's Hospital in London, who had them painted with black lacquer. They then placed 18 of the 31 stalls in the chapel of their hospital in a horseshoe shape, 7 stalls on each of the long walls and 2 stalls next to the portal on the west wall. The rest of the stalls were taken apart, sawn up, adapted and used as desks, chairs or wall paneling. Completion was celebrated on November 1, 1888. The convent in London used the choir stalls in this chapel for 75 years.

=== New building in Hythe ===
The chapel and hospital had to be demolished between 1963 and 1964 due to road regulation. The sisters relocated to Hythe in the county of Kent. The prioress of the convent, Reverend Mother Sladys Cathleen Bush, made contact with Buxheim. She visited the former Imperial Charterhouse with her architect in October 1963 to see the original location of the choir stalls. She intended to build a chapel in Hythe to the dimensions of the Buxheim choir stalls. When the chapel was completed in 1964, work began on installing the stalls. Changes were made compared to the installation in London. In the new structure, the long sides were each fitted with eight stalls and a row of lecterns. A double stall was placed next to the entrance portal. The framing of the original portal was redesigned as a high altar. On June 14, 1965, the chapel with the built-in choir stalls was consecrated.

In 1979, the convent decided to give up the hospital and the chapel and to sell the choir stalls. Prioress Sladys Cathleen Bush felt that the best solution was to return the choir stalls to Buxheim.

=== The return of the choir stalls ===
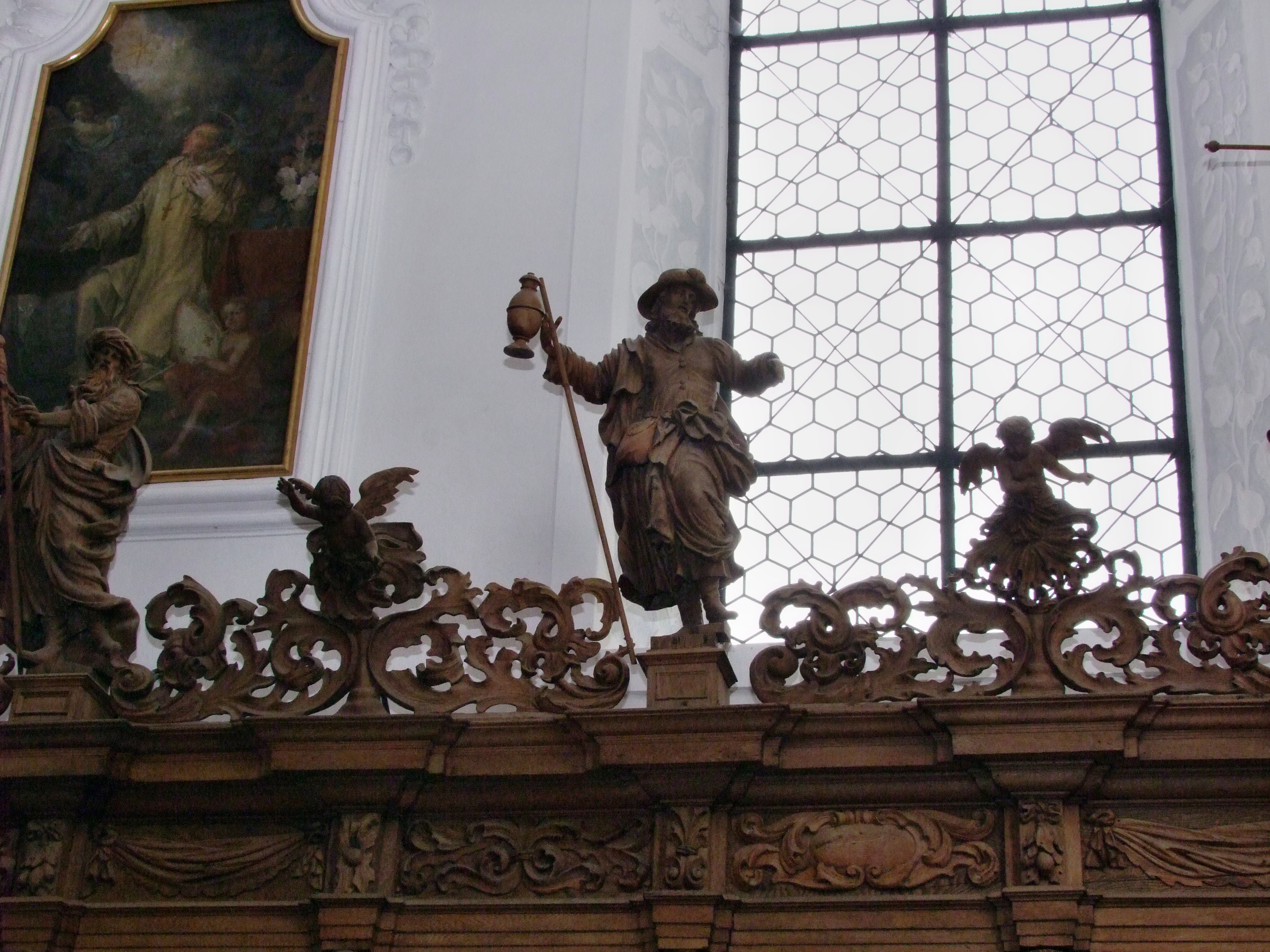
First back: James the Elder

News of the impending sale and the prioress's wish reached Peter Burman, then Secretary of the Council for the Care of Churches. At an international symposium on conservation issues in the summer of 1979, he told the head of the restoration workshops of the Bavarian State Office for the Preservation of Monuments, Dr. Karl-Ludwig Dasser, who immediately took an interest in the stalls. Back in Munich, he received permission from the general conservator Michael Petzet to negotiate the repatriation. The Buxheim Salesian convent, led by Father Herbert Müller, agreed. On December 8, Müller, Dasser and Burman met with Prioress Cathleen Bush for negotiations in Hythe. At the same time, contact was made with Professor John Withe, a member of the Reviewing Committee on the Export of Works of Art. As time was short to dismantle the chair, the auction house Sotheby's was commissioned to sell it at an estimated price of 450,000 pounds sterling. The company's management stated that it was their opinion that the work of art should return to its original location. The Free State of Bavaria, which was certainly interested in the chair, was unable to create the budgetary conditions to pay the purchase price in such a short space of time. In order to avoid another auction and thus possibly the complete dismemberment of the stalls, Georg Simnacher finally agreed by telephone at Dasser's request that the district of Swabia would act as the buyer, despite the unclear financial risks. The letter of intent to purchase was signed shortly afterwards. The purchase negotiations took place in Munich on July 16, 1980. The estimated price of 450,000 pounds sterling could not be reduced. Half of the price was due on delivery, the other half one year after the contract was signed. The transportation costs amounted to 34,000 pounds sterling. A district assembly was held in Hohenschwangau on July 28, 1980, to discuss the purchase. The purchase was approved by the district council by 20 votes to 3. The purchase contract was signed on August 6. Due to the devaluation of the Deutschmark in foreign exchange trading, the choir stalls increased in price from the estimated 1.8 million DM to 2,065,441 DM. After the purchase was completed, Edmund Melzl and Christoph Müller, restorers from the Bavarian State Office for the Preservation of Monuments, traveled to Hythe and documented the dismantling. The choir stalls first had to be temporarily stored in Canterbury, as no export license had yet been granted under British heritage legislation. Following the intervention of the Bavarian Minister of Culture in England, this approval was expedited and granted in October 1980.

In addition to the state of Bavaria, which provided a grant of DM 690,000 from the General Settlement Fund, the Federal Republic of Germany contributed DM 100,000, the Episcopal Finance Chamber of Augsburg DM 100,000, the Bavarian State Foundation DM 250,000 and the district of Unterallgäu DM 50,000. Donations were also received from the private sector, meaning that the district itself had to raise DM 725,442. The community of Buxheim waited impatiently for the arrival of the now famous pews. On December 4, 1980, the community greeted the garlanded container on a special truck with the ringing of bells and brass band music. The schoolchildren were given time off school to receive the choir stalls and were able to celebrate their arrival together with the adults in the monastery courtyard of the former Charterhouse. Georg Simnacher, then President of the District Council, began unpacking the stalls while still in the monastery courtyard. The first saint to be welcomed back to Buxheim was St. James the Elder. Simnacher held him up and shouted into the crowd "It's time again!". In an interview for the radio afterwards, Simnacher said "This is an hour of European understanding for art and monument protection."

=== Restoration and reconstruction ===
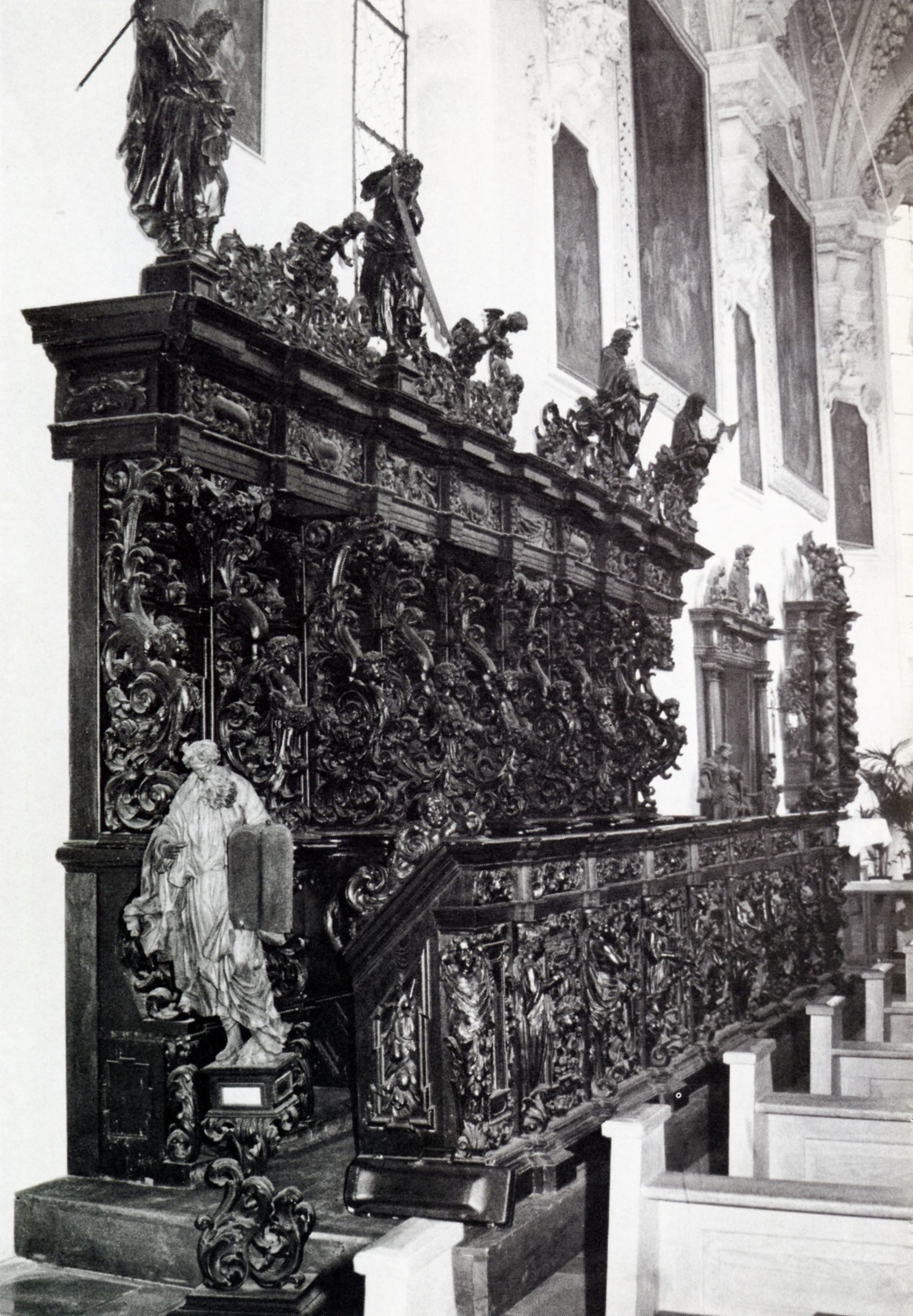
North row of the partial superstructure of the black painted frame from 1981

After the Free State of Bavaria waived its right to co-ownership, the district of Swabia became the sole owner of the choir stalls, which returned to their place in the church as a permanent loan from the district. As the rood screen was not to be closed again for liturgical reasons, only a partial reconstruction in its original place was initially considered. Together with English restorers, the two rows of eight seats each, as they had been set up in Hythe, were provisionally erected with the corresponding lecterns and consecrated on May 24, 1981. At a subsequent ceremony, Prioress Cathleen Bush received honorary citizenship of the parish of Buxheim. The unassembled parts of the pews were temporarily stored in the former Magdalen Chapel.

Restoration and reconstruction took place in two phases and began in the spring of 1981 under the direction of Edmund Melzl. Before the district of Swabia took over regular funding, the work was financed from donations provided by the Heimatdienst Buxheim. Between 1981 and 1986, the main work consisted of removing the black paint. The paint was removed from the pews with the help of 3500 liters of ethyl alcohol. The first phase of work cost DM 880,000. From 1986 to 1992, work on the stalls had to be stopped because the church was being restored.

In May 1992, the second phase of reconstruction began, for which only the photographs taken in the 1880s for sales purposes could be used as a guide. More parts had to be re-carved than initially thought. Acanthus decorations, fruit hangings and masks had to be added or completely replaced. New beams had to be made for eleven chairs. Only 21 of the 25 desks had been preserved. In 1991, oak blocks from the Franconian Lake District were ordered for these renovations and stored in the cloister. In total, around ten cubic meters of oak wood were needed for the reconstruction. Ignaz Waibl had processed around eighty cubic meters of wood. As the restoration work progressed, so did the desire to restore the entire stalls to the 1883 version, which was probably largely the same as the 1711 version. Georg Simnacher held talks with the Salesians, who used the former monastery church of the Carthusians for worship, and in March 1993 received their approval to close the rood screen. The way was now clear for the reconstruction of the entire stalls.

The construction of the sacristy portal, which had already been reconstructed in a simple form using old photographs, began. The sacristy portal carved by Waibl was lost. Photographs show that the stalls were directly adjacent to the doorframe cladding. Therefore, the north side was built first, followed by the south side, and work on the west side began in the late summer of 1993. The cloister, which had been opened during the restoration in 1955/56, was closed again and rebuilt as a cloister lantern. The second phase of the work cost DM 1,200,000, bringing the total cost of the restoration of the choir stalls, in which several municipal donors and the Free State of Bavaria again participated, to approximately DM 2 million, the same amount as the purchase price. After the work was completed, the choir stalls were solemnly consecrated in the priests' choir on June 24, 1994. In 2011, due to the high humidity in the church, the choir stalls have become infested with mold. An attempt is being made to find a coating that will prevent the fungus from spreading further.

== Description ==
The choir stalls consist of 31 seats and are arranged in a horseshoe shape in the style of the cloister loft. The north side with its twelve stalls is 10.62 meters long, the south side with thirteen stalls is 11.35 meters long and the west side with six seats is 8.34 meters long. The stalls are divided into three tiers and consist of the seats with shoulder rings, the dorsals built on top of them and the canopy-like entablature that ends at the top. The seats are around 1.02 meters high up to the shoulder rings, with the seat height varying between 46 and 49 centimetres. The dorsals have an average height of 1.42 meters, the entablature rises 47 centimetres. A seat has a total width of around 88 centimeters. The chair stands on a 38.5 centimeter high base.

=== Seats and desks ===
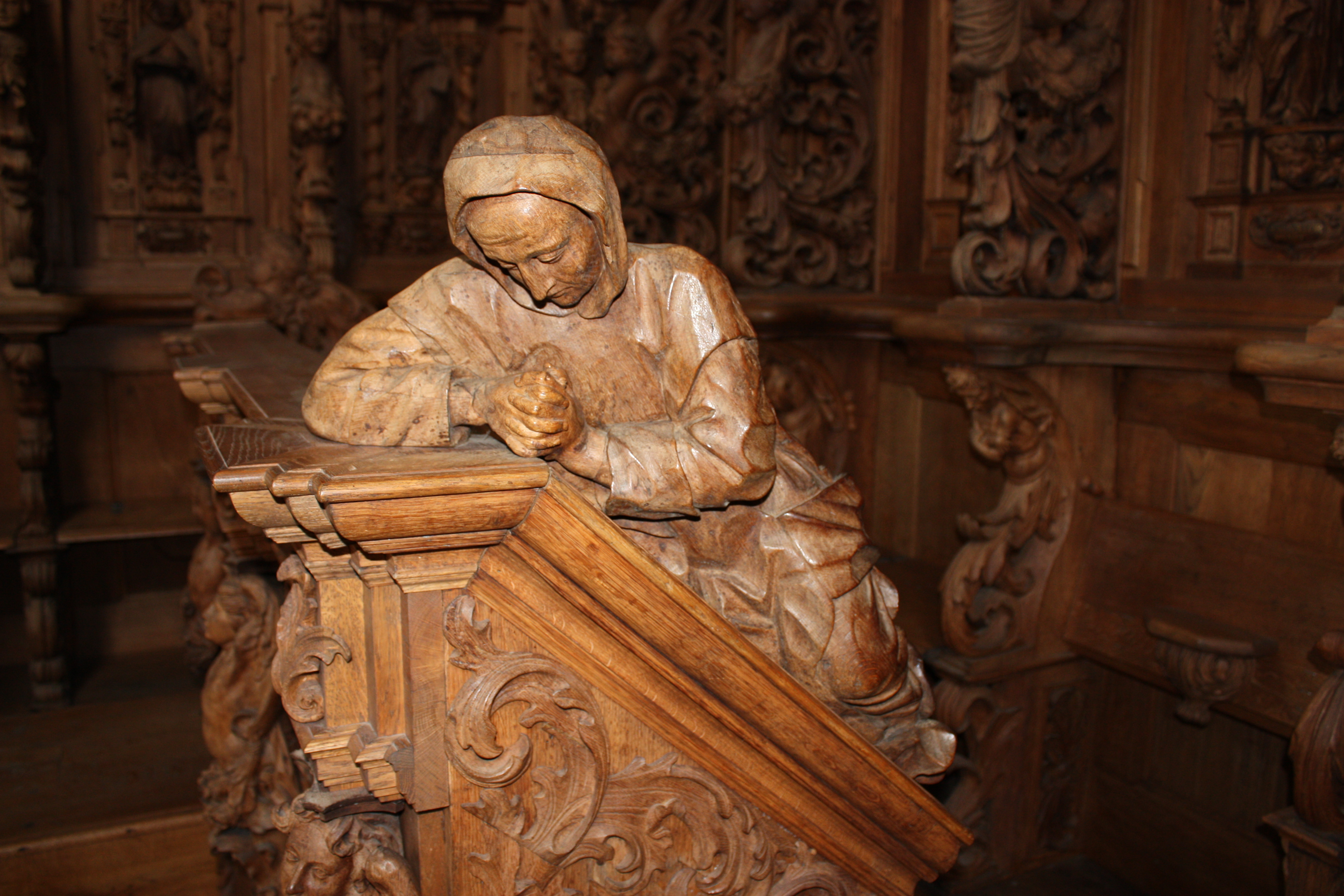
Carthusians at the lectern south of the entrance portal

As only a few remnants were preserved, the single-level walking floor had to be completely rebuilt. The visible parts are made of oak, the substructure is reinforced with spruce scantlings. The seats stand on the wooden floor. Between two stall cheeks, the seat cheeks, are the fold-up seat boards, which are fitted with misericords on the underside, a standing aid for the monks. The back panels are made of smooth wood. The seat cheeks are made of acanthus carving, which ends at the top in a console-like inclined half-figure that can be assigned to one of four different types. Some half-figures look like putti with wings, there is a scarf type with a headscarf that covers the entire back, a scarf type with crossed arms and a group characterized by a chest bandage. There are shoulder rings on the seat cheeks, which are up to 44 centimetres deep, and on the backs.

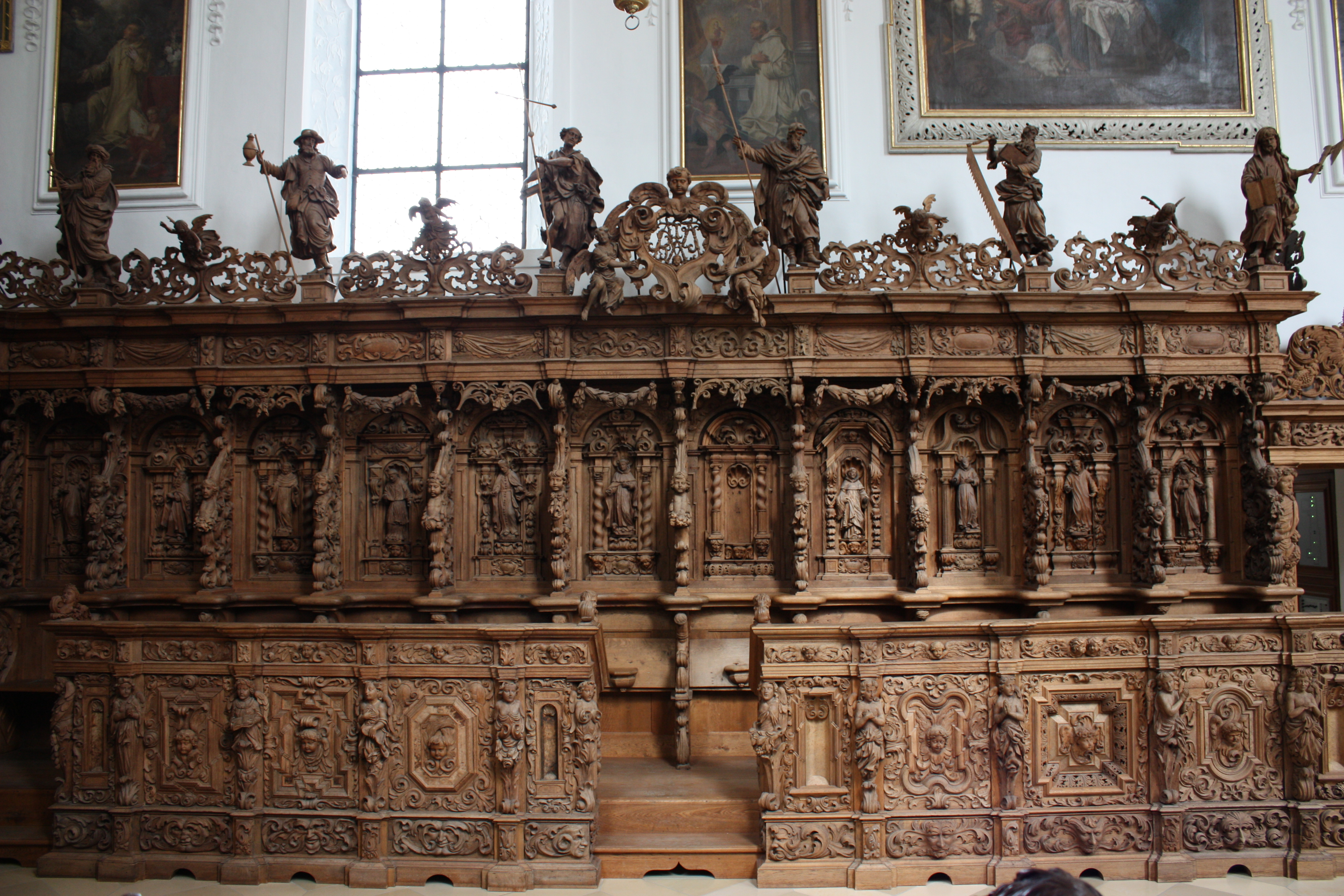
Frontal view of the north side with console blocks

Desks are set up in front of the seats at a distance of 68 centimetres, which are joined to form several blocks. To allow access to the rows of seats, six stalls have no lecterns. On the north side, there are two blocks of five lecterns each, and two lecterns each at the rood screen. On the south side, there are five and six lecterns in a row. At both ends of the blocks, putti are depicted on the sloping lectern covers, merging into acanthus tendrils. At the entrance portal, there are two praying Carthusian monks in the prostration characteristic of their order. Like the dorsal, the fronts of the lecterns are architecturally structured. The pedestals are decorated with acanthus tendrils, which form in the middle into partly evil-looking leaf masks and lend expression to the demonic. Half-figures of entablatures, mostly in the form of angels, rise from the foliage on the plinths. The fields between them are decorated with various geometric shapes, each with an angel's head in the center. The first and last panels of the blocks on the north and south sides are narrower and have an empty niche in the middle. Putti heads and acanthus tendrils fill the frieze zone of the entablature.

=== Dorsal ===
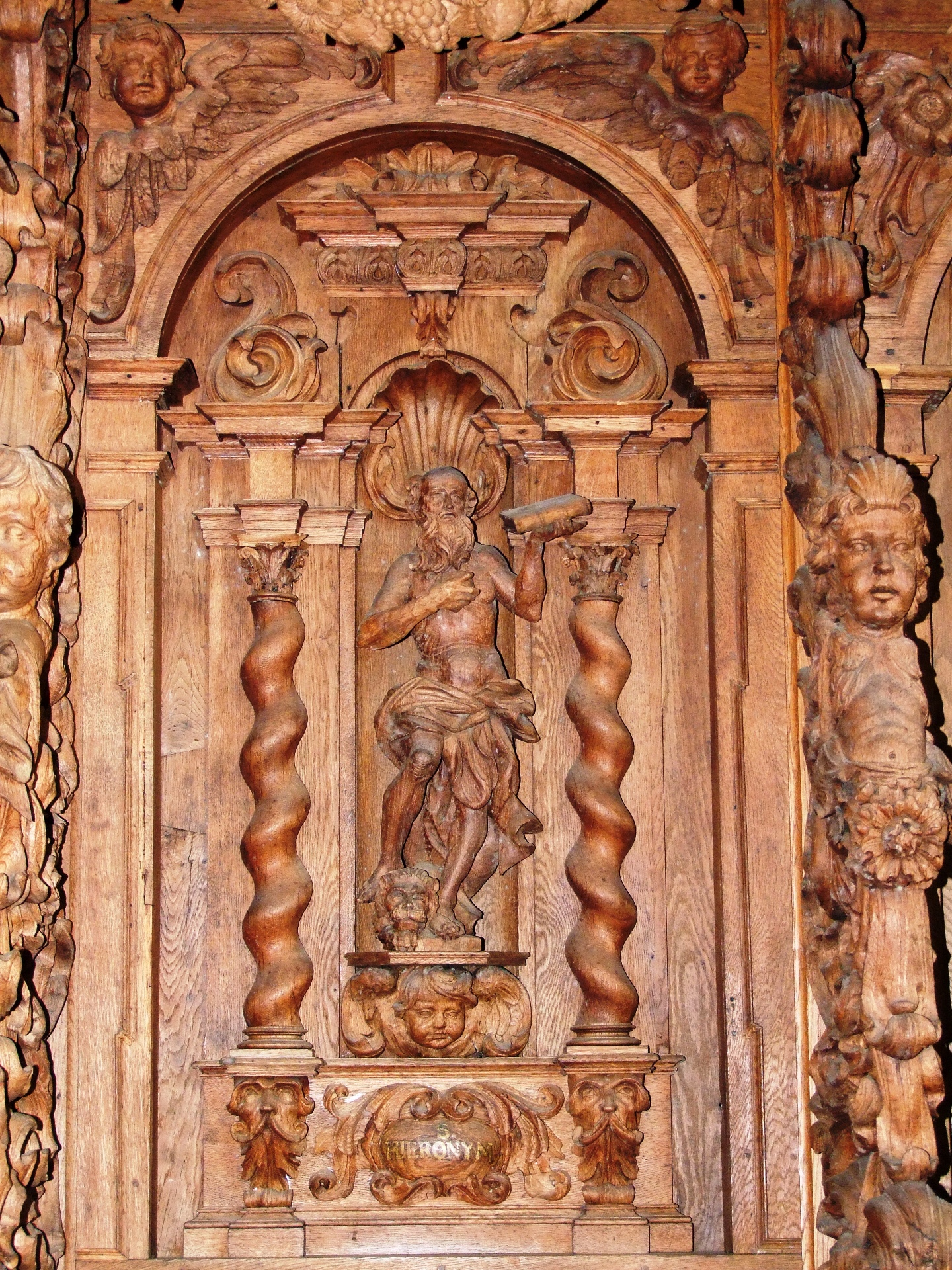
Dorsal with Hieronymus

The high stringers stand directly above the seat stringers on the shoulder rings, with two types of alternating heights on the north and south sides. The lower ones are 1.42 meters high and end at the lower edge of the entablature, giving the impression that they are supporting the entablature. The higher ones measure 1.57 meters and extend into the interior of the hollow entablature box. In the middle of the high cheeks, frontally aligned, are herm-like angel figures that merge into openwork carved acanthus scrollwork. Between the high cheeks are the dorsals, the back walls of the individual stalls, with round-arched niches that have an architectural structure. The lowest level is formed by a plinth with a name cartouche. Above the cartouche is another niche crowned by a shell with a putti or acanthus leaf console for the saint's figure, which is placed there. This niche is flanked by supporting elements, mostly columns or pilasters, which carry an entablature with a varied gable zone. The spandrels between the round arch and high cheeks are alternately filled with putti heads or acanthus leaves.

On the consoles of the niches are sculptures of Christ, Mary, founders of religious orders and personalities with whom individual orders are associated. At 47 centimetres, these figures are only about half the size of the statues on the cornice. As not only numerous attributes of saints and three sculptures have been lost, but also three names are missing from the cartouches, the order of the current arrangement had to be painstakingly reconstructed. There are still several places on the north and south sides where the attribution of a particular saint seems questionable.

==== West side ====
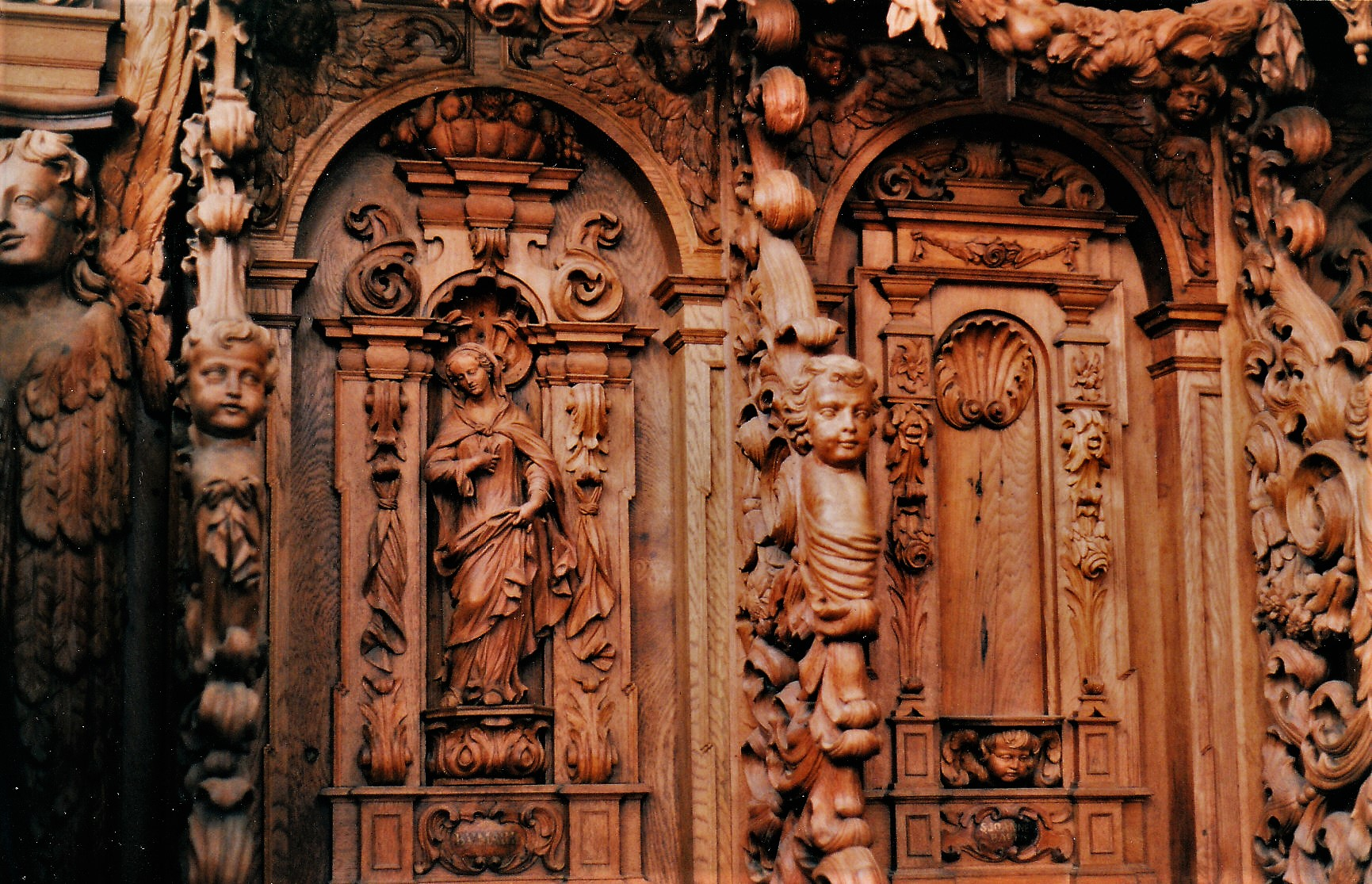
Dorsal with Maria

The entrance is flanked by Christ and Mary. Christ is depicted south of the portal, on the epistle side, with the globe in his left hand as Salvator mundi. His right hand is outstretched in blessing. This stall is intended for the prior. On the Gospel side, Mary gathers up her overlong robe with her left hand, while her right hand rests on her chest. The places next to Christ are dedicated to Elijah and Paul of Thebes. The Old Testament prophet Elijah, who is venerated by the Carmelites as the founder of their order, is stepping with his left foot on a severed bearded head. This attribute is related to God's judgment on Mount Carmel, when Elijah had them killed after his victory over the prophets of Baal 1 Kings 18. The place of Paul of Thebes is empty, his statue has been lost, only the inscription on the name cartouche reminds us of him. He was the first hermit and became a role model for the Paulines. The statue of John the Baptist has been lost. He was particularly revered by the hermits of St. John, an order that was confirmed by Pope Gregory XIII in 1575. The name of the Baptist on the cartouche indicates that he took his place next to Mary, followed by Anthony the Great, the father of Western monasticism, easily recognized by the cross of Anthony on his cloak and the little bell in his hands. The Antonites refer to him. They drew attention to him by ringing the bell of St. Anthony when collecting money for their hospitals.

==== South side ====
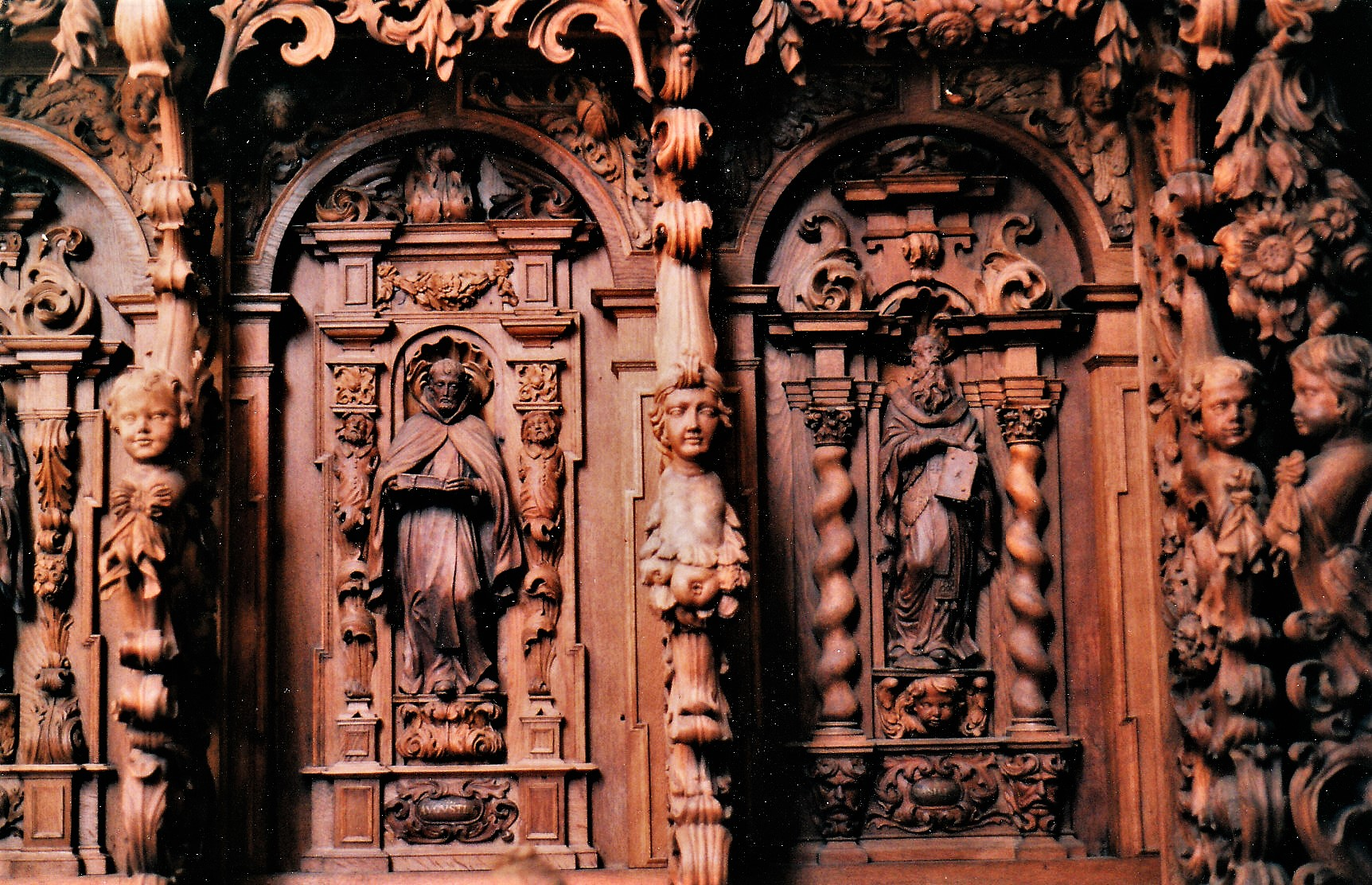
Dorsal with Augustine and Basil the Great

Paul of Thebes is followed on the south side by Basil the Great, who is regarded as the father of Oriental monasticism. As one of the great Greek church teachers, he is depicted in episcopal regalia with the Gospel book. The monks of the Greek rite live according to his rules. According to the inscription on the cartouche, a sculpture of St. Augustine, who is usually depicted as a bishop with a flaming heart as an attribute, is said to stand in the next dorsal field. The statue shows him in a religious habit with a book without an individual attribute that could provide ultimate certainty. The third field shows the Benedictine abbot and reformer Odo of Cluny, who tightened the rules for his order. Next to him is Bruno of Cologne, the founder of the Carthusians, in his habit. The hermit William of Malavalle stands out from all the others with his unusual clothing. He is wearing a helmet and chain mail under a penitential robe of furs. His hands are folded in prayer. He is a model for the Wilhelmites, whose order was founded at his grave. The next cartouche is inscribed with Stephen of Muret, the name of the founder of the Grammontenses. The sculpture cannot be attributed to him with absolute certainty. It depicts a monk holding a ring with his right index finger. There is no doubt about John of Matha, the co-founder of the Trinitarians, who is clothed in his habit. The cross of the order is clearly visible at chest height on the scapular.

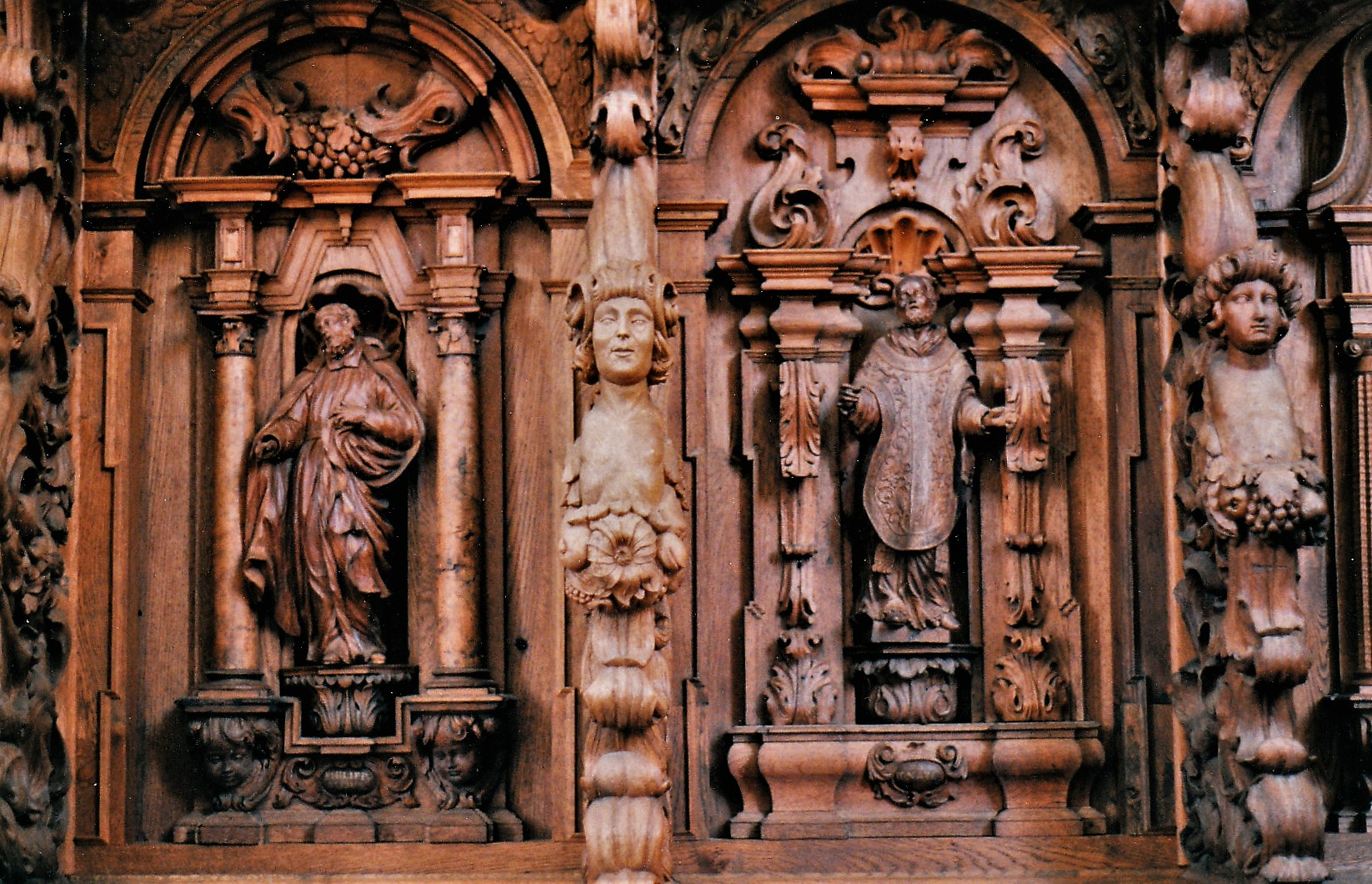
Dorsale with Philipp Neri and Ignatius of Loyola

The name cartouche is missing from the next stall and so, according to Friedrich Kobler, it is not possible to prove who was intended to be there. Francis of Paola, the founder of the Pauline Order (Minims), belongs to the 15th/16th century and does not fit between John of Matha and Peter Nolascus, both of whom can be dated to the 12th/13th century, as the figures in the two longitudinal rows are arranged chronologically from west to east. The fact that his tonsure is missing and that he is not girded with a rope over his scapular speaks against the thesis that the figure is the founder of the order. Petrus Nolascus is a co-founder of the Mercedarians and can be clearly identified by the coat of arms of the Kingdom of Aragon on his scapular. Due to the lack of a cartouche, Kobler leaves the occupation of the next niche open. It depicts Birgitta of Sweden, the founder of the Birgitten Order, holding a book in her hands. Beneath her headscarf, the so-called Birgitten crown, which is part of the Birgittines' religious costume, is visible. Next to her stands Kajetan von Thiene, co-founder of the Theatines, dressed in a belted cassock and a cloak with a collar. He is followed by Ignatius of Loyola, the founder of the Jesuits, in a chasuble and with outstretched arms. According to the inscription, Philip Neri, who founded the Order of the Oratorians, is the last in the row that was shortened during the Baroque period. He wears a long cloak over a cassock girded with a cingulum.

==== North side ====
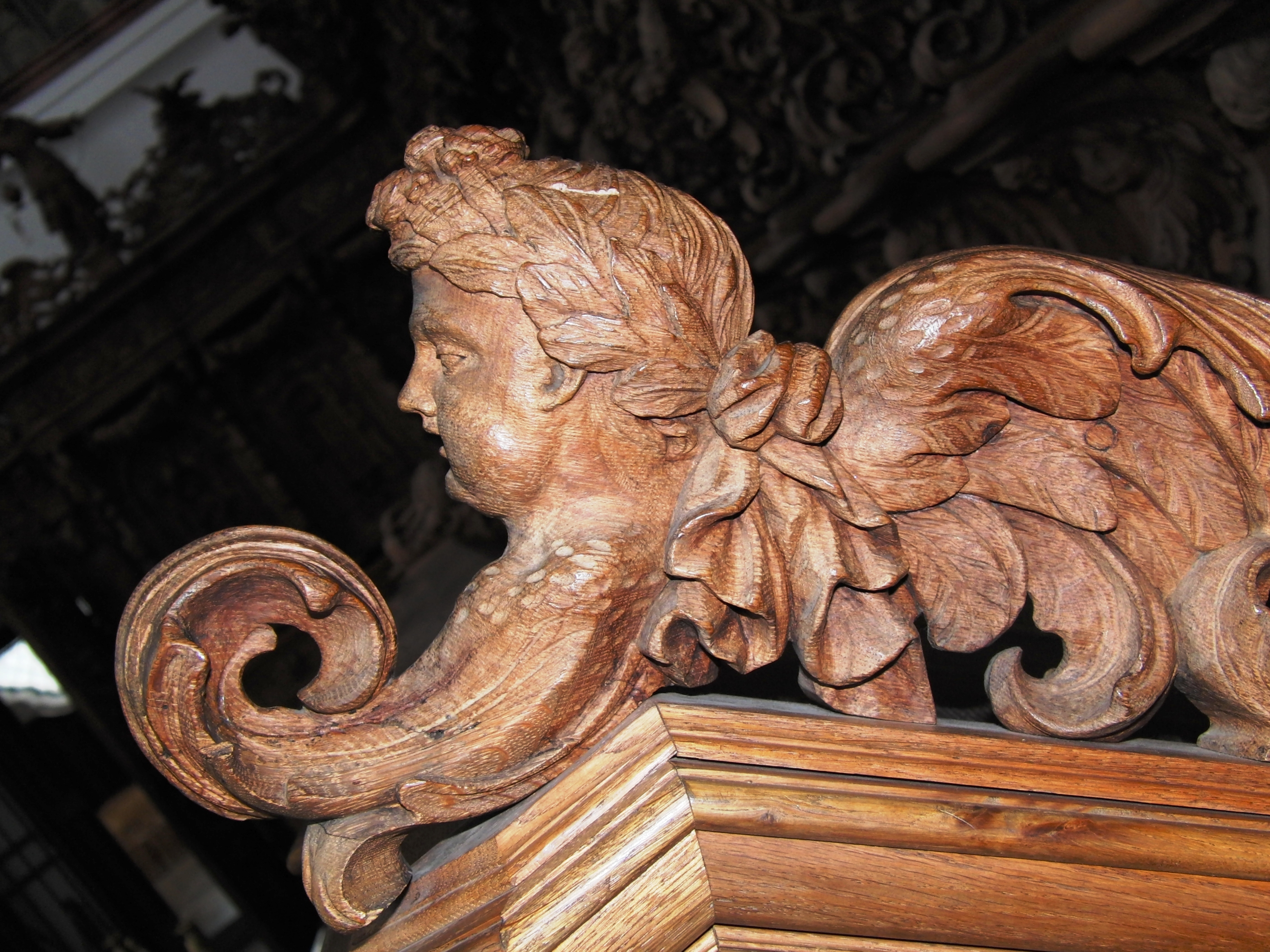
Putti head on a desk

The church father Jerome occupies the first place in the west of the north side. Standing with his right foot on a lion which, according to legend, he had pulled a thorn out of its paw, he is not depicted as a cardinal, as is often the case, but as a penitent hermit. He is scantily clad, with only a cloth around his hips, and strikes his chest with a stone with his right hand as an exercise in penance; with his left he holds up his translation of the Bible. Benedict of Nursia, with a book in his right hand on which is a cracked cup, was the founder of the Benedictines and, like Anthony the Great, is known as the father of Western monasticism. The cup refers to the legend in which it is reported that fellow monks wanted to kill the saint because of his strict discipline. When Benedict blessed the cup with poisoned wine, it shattered and the wine ran out. According to the inscriptions, Romuald of Camaldoli, the founder of the Camaldolese monks, and Robert of Molesme, co-founder of the Cistercians, should stand in the next two places. There are slight uncertainties with both figures, as they cannot be clearly identified by any characteristic attributes. The situation is different with Norbert of Xanten, the founder of the Premonstratensians, who despite his lack of attributes can be recognized by his clothing, which indicates his existence as a regular canon and his activity as Archbishop of Magdeburg.

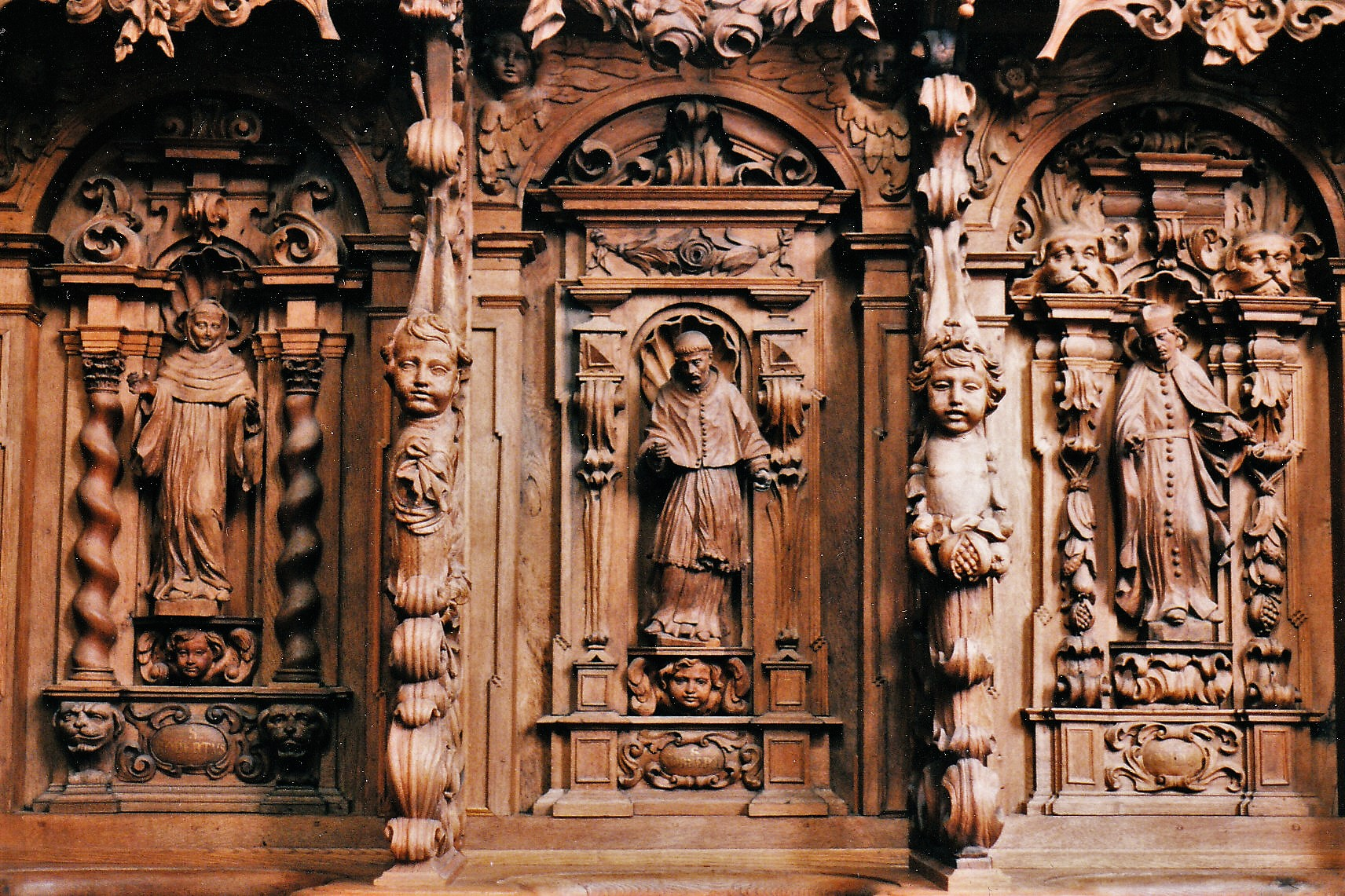
Dorsale with Robert of Molesme, Norbert of Xanten and Guido of Montpellier

Equally clearly identifiable is Guido of Montpellier, the founder of the Brothers of the Order of the Holy Spirit, dressed in a gown, biretta and cloak. A patriarchal cross with split ends can be seen on the cloak and gown as a sign of the order. He is followed by Dominic of Caleruega, founder of the Dominicans, with a dog as an attribute at his feet. His mother had dreamed that her son was a dog with a torch in his mouth that lit up the whole world. The torch on the statue has been lost. The dorsal field next to Dominic is empty; the cartouche indicates that it is the place of Philippus Benitius, the Prior General of the Servites. In the next niche is the statue of Petrus de Murrone, a hermit who was elected pope in 1294 and resigned his office as Coelestine V after just a few months. As an attribute, he holds the discarded papal mantle on his right arm. He is the founder of the Coelestine Hermits, who were later named after him. Due to the missing inscription, the figure next to Petrus de Murrone can no longer be identified. In the current installation, the place is occupied by Francis of Assisi, the founder of the Franciscan order. He is recognizable by his stigmata. According to the cartouche, the penultimate sculpture depicts John of God, whom the Brothers of Mercy took as their model. His attributes are lost. Teresa of Ávila, the Carmelite reformer, stands at the end of the shortened north side with a flame in front of her chest as a sign of her love of God.

==== Sculpture program of the dorsal fields ====
In accordance with the Carthusian way of life, hermits and founders of hermit orders were preferred when selecting the saints. No engraving templates for the carved figures have yet been found. It is not possible to identify all the statues, including their allocation to the correct places, with absolute certainty.

The architectural structure of the dorsal fields changes from field to field. Waibl designed the opposing dorsals on the north and south sides to be very similar, so that it is possible to speak of a symmetrical structure of the stalls. When the stalls were shortened by five, not only were the last chairs of the two rows removed, but a change was made in the middle of the stalls. Either the seat of Francis of Paola was arbitrarily placed on the south side or the stalls opposite him on the north side were removed. From the west, up to the pair of Dominic of Caleruega and John of Matha, all the dorsals are symmetrical; Francis of Paola has no corresponding counterpart, but the dorsals of Philip Benitius and Peter Nolascus belong together, and all the following ones are also shifted by one place from the point of view of symmetry.

North			Center aisle	South		
Missing	Image	Figure		Figure	Image	Missing
				Philipp Neri; 16th century founder of the Oratorians		
		Teresa von Ávila; 16th century reformer of the Carmelites		Ignatius von Loyola; 15th/16th century Founder of the Jesuits		
		John of God (?); 15th/16th century Model for the Brothers of Mercy		Kajetan of Thiene; 15th/16th century co-founder of the Theatines		
Cartridge		Franz von Assisi (?); 12th/13th century Founder of the Order of Friars Minor		Birgitta von Schweden (?); 14th century founder of the Birgittines		Cartridge
		Petrus de Murrone; 13th century Founder of the Coelestine Hermits		Petrus Nolascus; 12th/13th century co-founder of the Mercedarians		
Figure		Philippus Benitius; 13th century Prior General of the Servites		Franz von Paola (?); 15th/16th century Founder of the Paulaner (Minimen)		Cartridge
		Dominikus von Caleruega; 12th/13th century Founder of the Dominicans		Johannes von Matha; 12th/13th century co-founder of the Trinitarians		
		Guido von Montpellier; 12th/13th century Founder of the Brothers of the Order of the Holy Spirit		Stephan von Muret (?); 11th/12th century Founder of the Grammontenses		
		Norbert von Xanten; 11th/12th century Founder of the Premonstratensians		Wilhelm von Malavalle; 12th century model for the Wilhelmites		
		Robert von Molesme (?); 11th/12th century Co-founder of the Cistercians		Bruno von Köln; 11th/12th century Founder of the Carthusians		
		Romuald von Camaldoli (?); 10th/11th century Founder of the Camaldolese Order		Odo von Cluny; 9th/10th century Benedictine abbot (reformer)		
		Benedikt von Nursia; 5th/6th century Founder of the Benedictines		Augustinus (?); 4th/5th century Author of the Rule of Augustine		
		Hieronymus; 4th/5th century Hermit and Doctor of the Church		Basilius der Große; 4th century Father of Oriental monasticism		
West (northern half)			Center aisle	West (southern half)		
Missing	Image	Figure		Figure	Image	Missing
		Antonius der Große; 3rd/4th century Father of Western monasticism		Paulus von Theben; 3./4. Jh. Erster Eremit und Vorbild für die Pauliner		Figure
Figure		Johannes der Täufer; 1st century model for the hermits of St. John		Elija; 9th century BC Venerated as "founder" by the Carmelites		
		Maria		Christus		

=== Framing ===
The entablature, decorated with ornaments and figures, is placed on the dorsal walls and the lower high cheeks. Its weight is mainly supported by tie rods fixed in the wall of the priest's choir. The lower part of the entablature consists of three steps. Above this is a frieze zone, followed by a cornice. Three ornamental forms alternate in the frieze: a drapery type with a cloth gathered on two sides by a knot, a cartouche type with acanthus leaves and a variation of an acanthus vine ornament. Under the entablature, garlands of fruit, flowers and tendrils are stretched between the high cheeks.

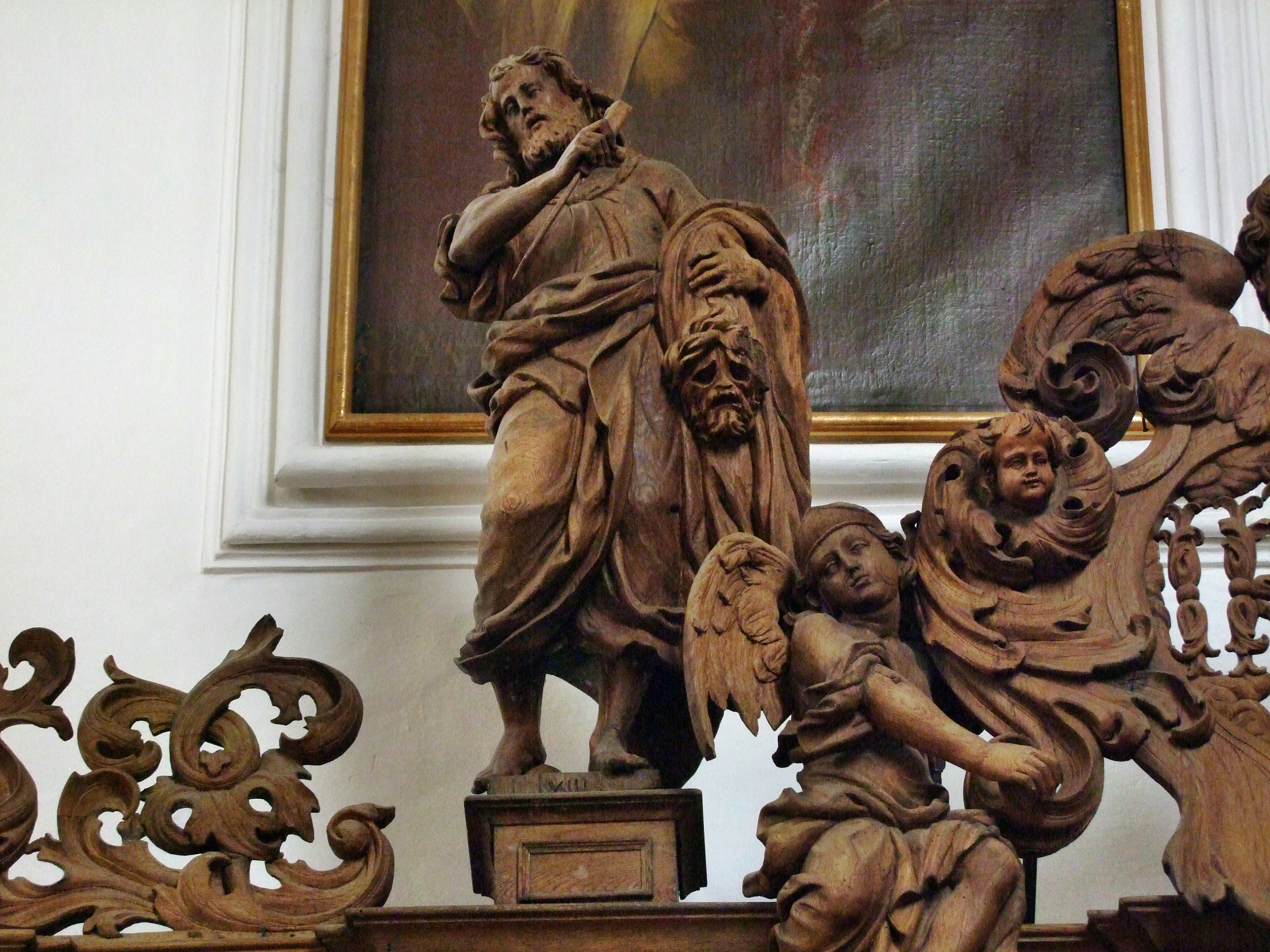
Bartholomew with the skin removed from his arm

On the north and south sides of the cornice, half of the sculptures of the twelve apostles are placed on small pedestals. Instead of Judas Iscariot, they include his chosen successor Matthias. They can be recognized by their attributes, some of which had been lost and have been replaced. The areas between the approximately one meter high apostles are filled with carved angels, some of whom are holding musical instruments, and tendrils. On the south side, the line-up begins in the west with Peter, who holds two keys in his right hand as an attribute. Next to him stands his brother Andrew, his back leaning against a large branch cross, the St. Andrew's Cross named after him. The youthful-looking John follows with the chalice in his left hand. The next figure is Bartholomew, who is carrying a knife in his right hand, while his left arm is covered with the skin of his face, which has already been removed. Between John and Bartholomew, angels hold the Jesus monogram IHS, framed by three putti heads, in which the letter H is anchored with three nails in a heart with a side wound and surmounted by a cross. Because of the walking stick in his right hand, the next apostle can only be James the Younger, who is placing his right foot on a pillar stump. The last in this row is Judas Thaddeus, who is leaning on his club with his left hand.

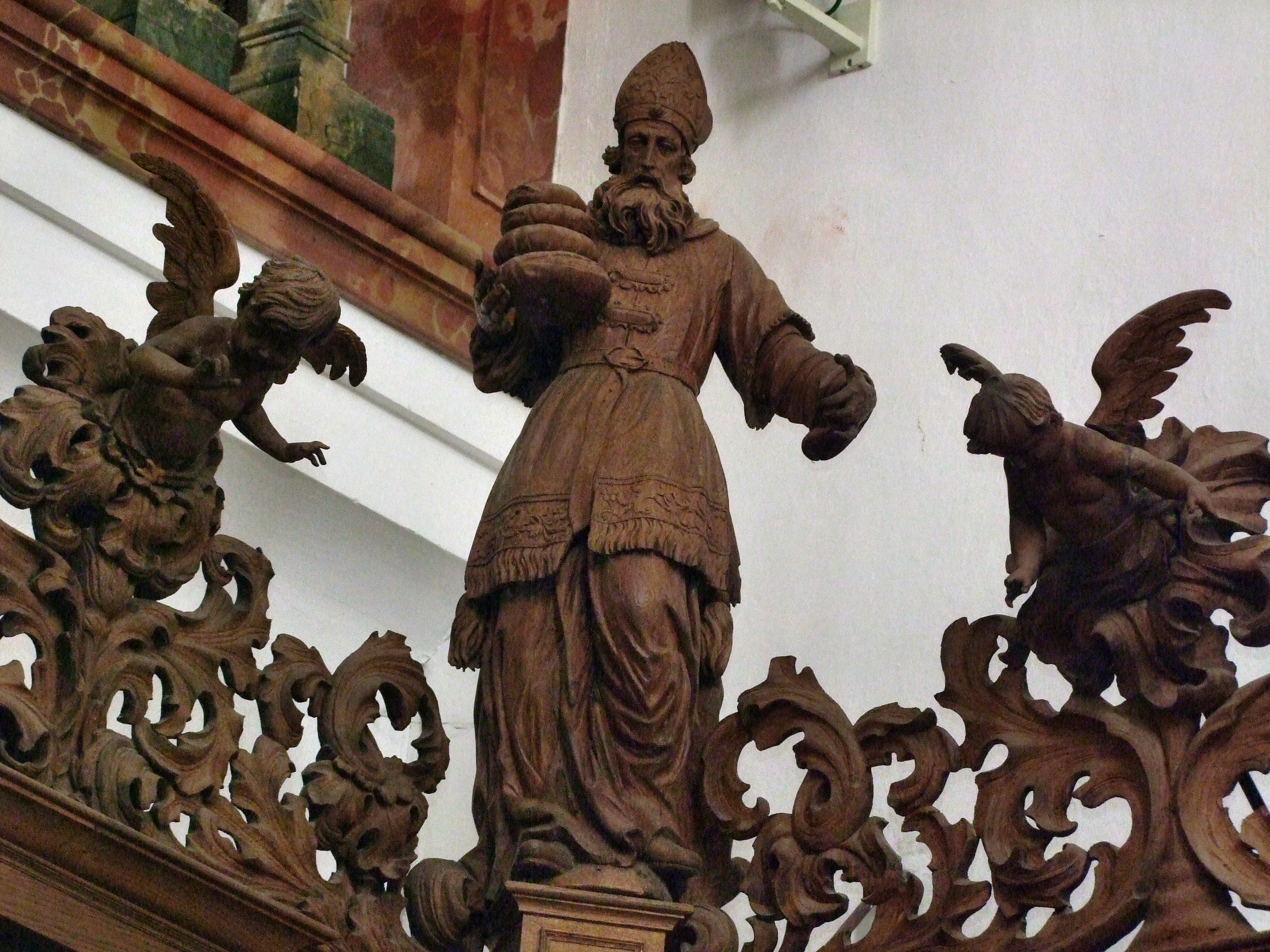
Melchizedek with the loaves

In the west of the north side, Matthew stands at the beginning of the row of apostles. He is accompanied by a sword as an attribute. The clothing and equipment of a pilgrim with staff, bag, pilgrim's hat and a shell belong to James the Elder. In third place is Philip with the staff of the cross in his left hand, followed by Thomas with a long lance. Between them, two angels present a Marian monogram crowned by a putti head with wings. Next to Thomas is Simon with a saw in his right hand, which reaches from his pedestal to shoulder height. The final figure is Matthias with an axe in his raised left hand.

Andrew and Philip are the only apostles for whom a graphic model is known. They are copperplate engravings from the Apostles' Creed cycle by Hieronymus Wierix (1553–1619), which have been transposed upside down.

The sculptures on the west side depict figures from the Old Testament, two on either side of the entrance portal. From north to south, they are Melchizedek, Aaron, Moses and King David. Melchizedek is holding loaves of bread in his right hand. The wine jug in his left hand has been lost. According to Gen 14:18, as priest and king of Salem, he presented Abraham with bread and wine. Aaron wears a high priestly robe and holds a censer in his hands. His brother Moses presents the tablets of the law with his left hand and King David can be recognized as a psalmist with his harp. What all the figures have in common is an animated posture, combined with lively gestures and a lightness of manner. In many of the figures, one foot is raised by stepping on stones, steps or a broken piece of pillar.

=== Entrance portal ===
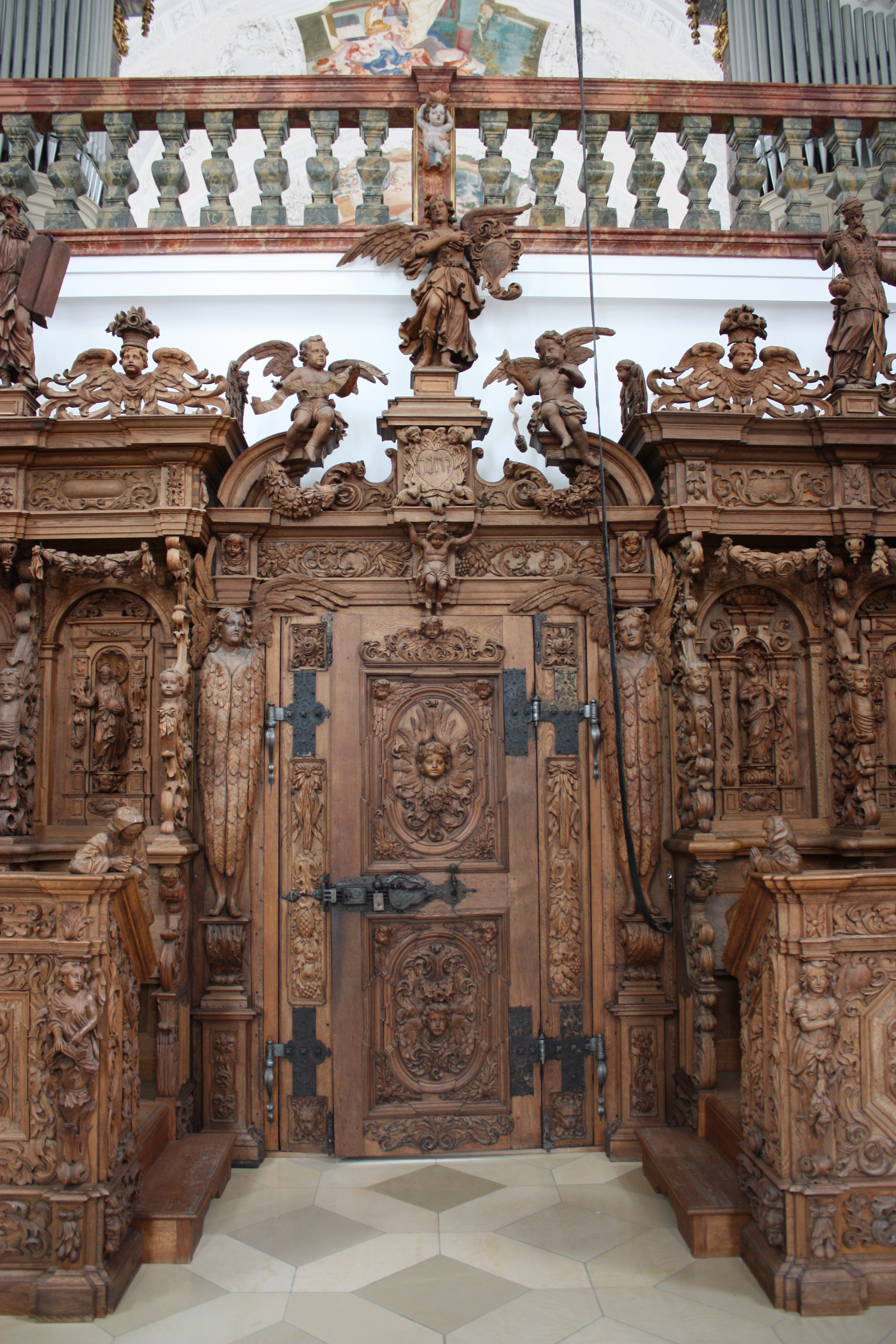
Entrance portal at the cloister lighthouse

The dominant figure on the west side is that of the Archangel Michael above the entrance portal. It was carved by a different carver than the other cornice figures, appears more ponderous and is more rooted in tradition. The archangel stands on a raised postament structure and towers above the other statues despite the lowering of the portal during the Baroque period. With his right hand, he points to the shield in his left with the words QUIS UT DEUS (Who is like God?), the Latin form of the name Michael. It means that God alone is entitled to rule. On the pedestal, the proper name of God in Hebrew letters, the tetragram, is inscribed on a heart-shaped surface, surrounded by the heads of the four living creatures which, according to the Revelation of John, surround God's throne. They resemble a lion, a bull, a man and an eagle and praise the holiness of God. Their song of praise is written on the banners held by two angels: Sanctus, sanctus, sanctus Dominus Deus Sabaoth. In contrast to Rev 4, the last word is not "omnipotens" but "Sabaoth", thus referring to the Mass chant of the Catholic liturgy. The four seasons are depicted on the frieze zone of the portal, which was originally at the same height as the pews. In the center, an atlant bears the pedestal of the archangel Michael. To his left, flowers and ears of grain, symbols of spring and summer, spill out of two cornucopias; to the right, grapes refer to autumn and a monk warming his hands over a fire refers to winter. The date of completion of the choir stalls is artfully inscribed between the seasons with the number 1691. The door, which is decorated with angel heads, is flanked by two cherubs. In contrast to the raised stalls, the entrance portal stands directly on the stone floor.

== Art historical classification ==
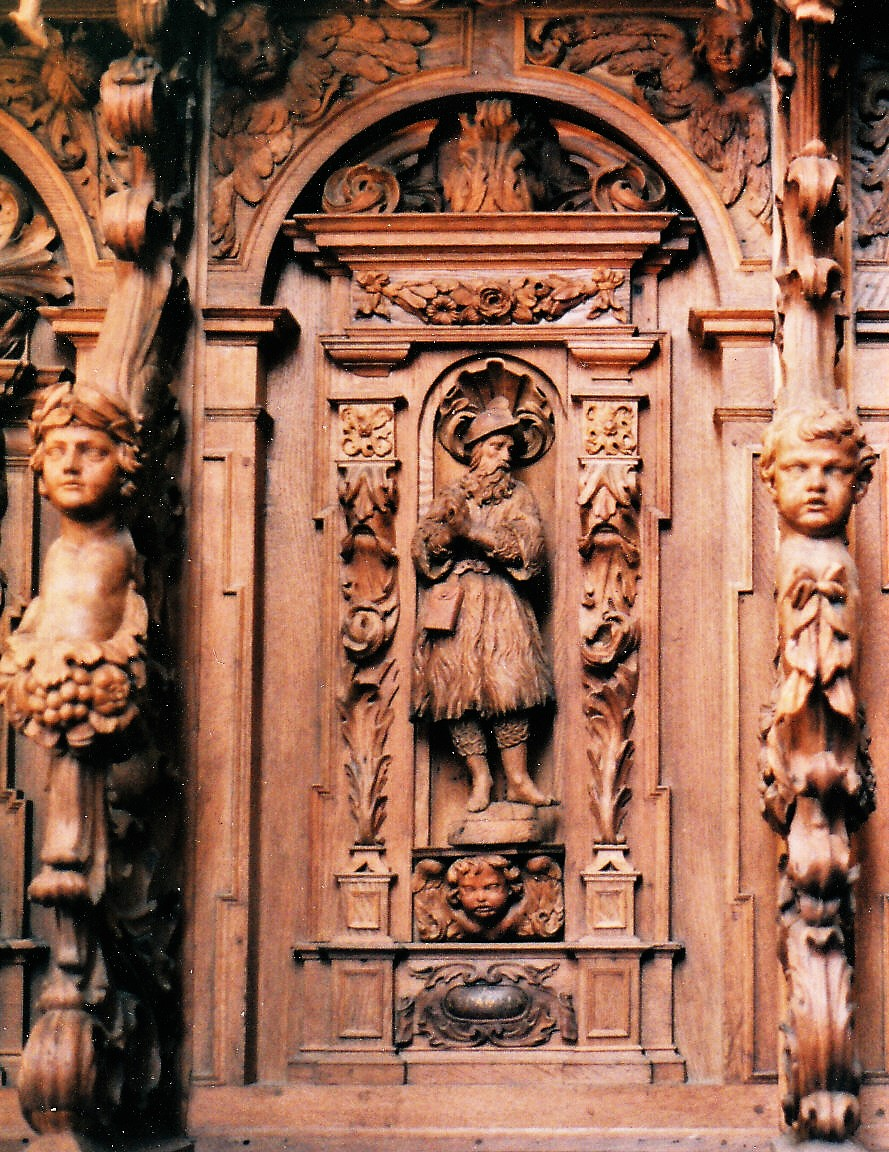
Wilhelm von Mallavalle in Buxheim

The horseshoe shape of the choir stalls originated with the Carthusians together with the development of the cloister rood screen in the first half of the 13th century. They were the only order in the German-speaking world to retain the combination of choir stalls and rood screen until the Baroque period. Without exception, the stalls were built in the cell type, with high cheeks separating the monks to avoid distraction. In a stall with high cheeks, the design of the dorsal is only visible when viewed from the front. When viewed at an angle, the purely ornamental high cheeks move closer together and hide the rear wall. As in all cartouches, the stalls are arranged in a single row and the entrance portal in the west is architecturally connected to the stalls.

There are no exact models for the Buxheim choir stalls and their iconographic program. Nevertheless, two stalls that influenced its design are worth mentioning. One is the choir stalls of the Marienparadies Charterhouse in Gdansk, made under the direction of Prior Johannes Bilstein, who brought his experience from the construction of the Gdansk stalls to Buxheim. There are similarities between the two stalls in the high cheeks, the ornamental architecture of the dorsal panels and the opulence of the ornaments and angel heads. A second possible source is the choir stalls of the monastery church in Weißenau, which anticipated the most important part of the iconographic program, the depiction of the founders of the order.

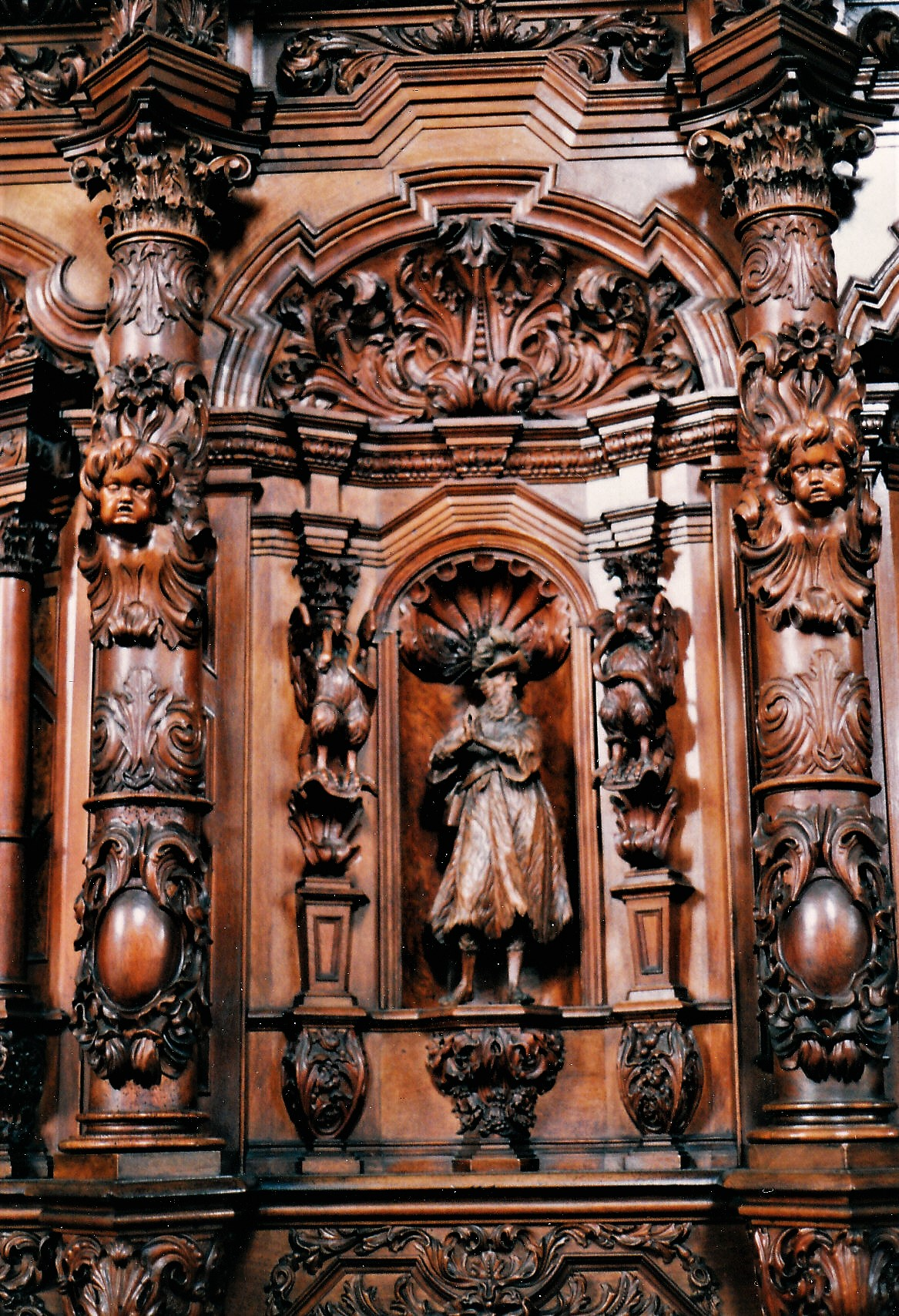
Wilhelm von Mallavalle in Rot an der Rot

Together with the stucco work from the workshop of Johann Schmuzer in Wessobrunn, the stalls in Buxheim are one of the earliest examples of the development of independent acanthus ornamentation in southern Germany. Together with the works created after it, it belongs to the figuratively decorated group of Swabian acanthus choir stalls. These include, above all, the high-quality choir stalls in the monastery churches of Rot an der Rot and Schussenried and the stalls of the chapter house in Obermarchtal, in which carvers who had already worked in Buxheim under the direction of Ignaz Waibl were involved. The acanthus choir stalls replaced the Swabian sculptor's stalls, which used cartilage as a form of ornamentation. The choir stalls at Ittingen Charterhouse were also made by local masters based on the Buxheim model. Ittingen Prior Christophorus Schmid was inspired by Buxheim for his choir stalls when he visited the Lower German province of the Carthusians with Johannes Bilstein from 1686 to 1693 and was often a guest in Buxheim. Characteristic of the Buxheim stalls and their successors is not only the ornamentation, but also the rare program of the founders of the most important religious orders, which can only be found outside this group in Weißenau.

== Brethren choir stalls ==
The choir stalls were built under Prior Petrus Leickart in 1720. It consisted of a total of 32 chairs arranged in a U-shape in the choir. Ten chairs each were placed on the north and south sides, twelve in front of the gallery, with an entrance left open in the middle. Whether the northern and southern sections under the gallery were walled up for this reason can no longer be determined today. In the account books from 1720, the painter Gabriel Weiß is mentioned in connection with the stalls. However, it is questionable whether he was responsible for the entire production of the stalls.

The Brethren choir stalls were only mentioned again at the auction in 1883. The following is noted in the catalog: "302. a choir stall with six seats in soft wood, above the seats a boiserie with seven caryatid figures, the balustrade with two parts and three caryatids on the right and left, on the ends angel heads with arabesques; 303. a choir stall ditto, counterpart to the previous one, of the same beauty and other quality as the previous one; 304. a choir stall in soft wood with 10 seats, at the back a boiserie at the top with a cranked cornice; above it the seats are separated at the top and bottom by projecting richly carved openwork partitions; above the cornice at the top a splendid openwork ornamental attachment, which is partly damaged but can easily be restored. The parapet with lectern at the front has six large, richly framed panels separated by six splendidly carved caryatids, two similar niches at each end of the lectern, the side panels and ends of the four lecterns decorated with foliage heads with busts of angels; 305. a choir stall, similar to the previous one, but with the top completely preserved. Two magnificent works in their own right and, if not as choir stalls, very easily usable as boiseries in a salon." It is not known who bought the choir stalls at this auction.

== Literature ==
- Wolfgang Braunfels (ed.), Lexikon der christlichen Ikonographie, vol. Band 1–8 (1968–1976), Freiburg im Breisgau u. a.: Herder Verlag, ISBN 3-451-22568-9
- Michael Petzet, ed. (1994), Das Buxheimer Chorgestühl. Beiträge zur Bau- und Kunstgeschichte der ehemaligen Reichskartause Buxheim und zur Restaurierung des Chorgestühls, Bayerisches Landesamt für Denkmalpflege, Arbeitsheft 66, München: Lipp, ISBN 3-87490-569-1
- Edmund Melzl, Jahrbuch der bayerischen Denkmalpflege (Sonderdruck), vol. 56/57 (2002/2003), München: Deutscher Kunstverlag, pp. 71–78
- Georg Dehio (1989), Handbuch der Deutschen Kunstdenkmäler. Bayern III: Schwaben, München: Deutscher Kunstverlag, pp. 223–226, ISBN 3-422-03008-5
- Michael Müller, ed. (1980), Die Odyssee des Buxheimer Chorgestühls ist glücklich beendet. Das prachtvolle Chorgestühl ist zurückgekehrt, Buxheim: Eigenverlag
- Michael Müller (1982), Kartausenführer: Buxheim. Kartausenkirche mit Chorgestühl, Pfarrkirche, Annakapelle, Mönchszelle, Kreuzgang und Museum, Buxheim: Eigenverlag
