= Güterstein Charterhouse =

Former Carthusian monastery in Germany

Coordinates: 48°29′28″N 9°21′26″E

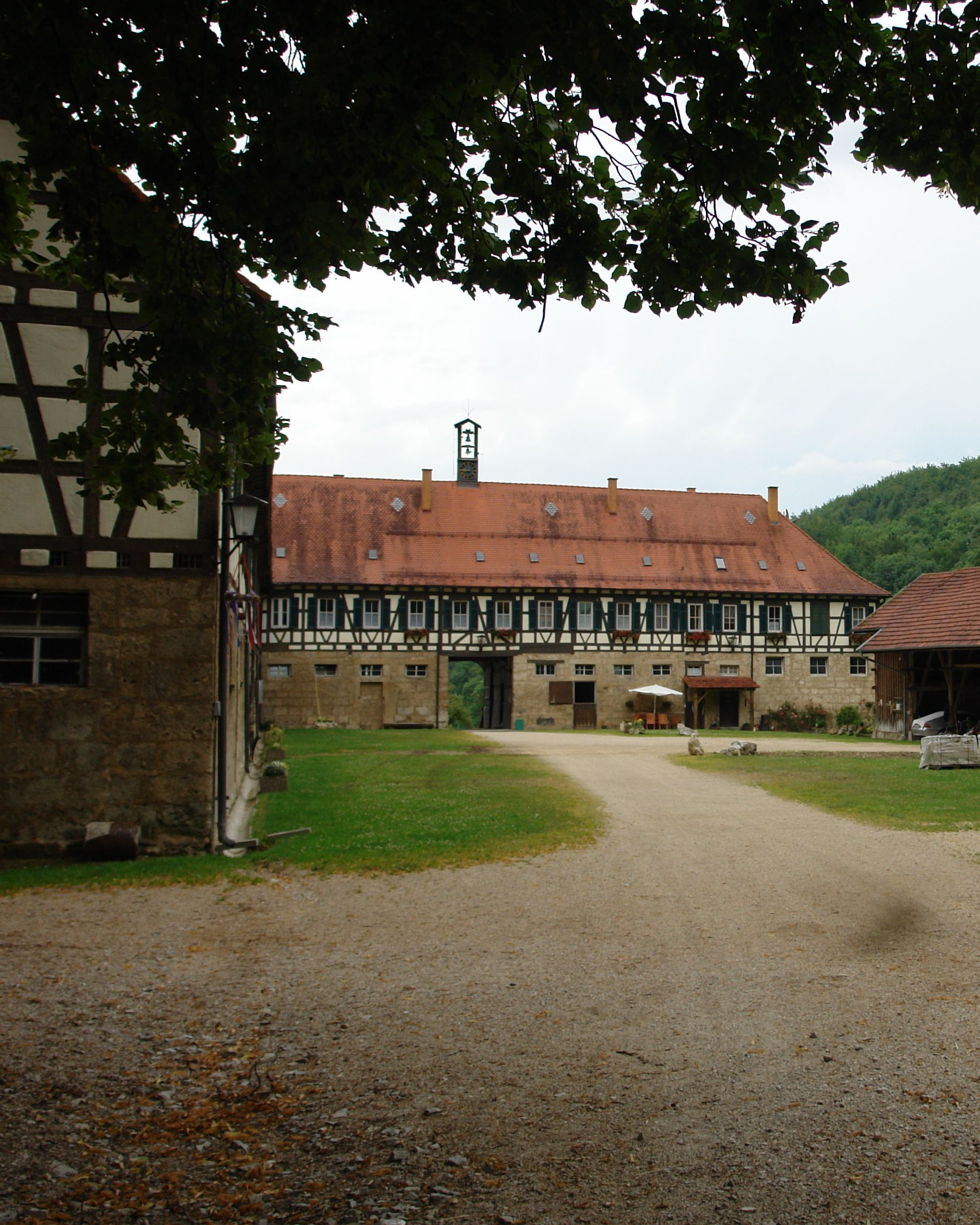
The Güterstein stud farm which occupies the site of the former monastery at the foot of the waterfalls

Güterstein Charterhouse (German: Kartause Güterstein) was a Carthusian monastery in the Swabian Alb near Bad Urach, Baden-Württemberg, Germany.

== History ==
First documented as a Cistercian foundation in the 13th century in connection with Cardinal Konrad von Urach, abbot general of the Cistercian Order, it was later taken over by the Benedictines of Zwiefalten Abbey, under whom it prospered in the 14th and early 15th centuries under the protection of Counts of Württemberg.

In 1439, also under the influence of the Counts of Württemberg, the monastery was given to the Carthusians, whom they regarded as better able to assist with their political aims. The monastery benefitted from secured finances and new buildings. From 1441 it became the burial place of the family of the counts. Several significant printed works intended for the laity were produced at Güterstein, which became prominent within the Carthusian Order for its size.

However, in 1477 Count Eberhard V founded the University of Tübingen and in the same year invited the Brethren of the Common Life, an active pastoral order, to Urach, and the importance of the Carthusians gradually dwindled until in 1535 the Reformation brought the monastery to an end. Most of the monks moved to Buxheim Charterhouse, and an attempt to revive Güterstein in 1550/1551 was unsuccessful.

== Buildings ==
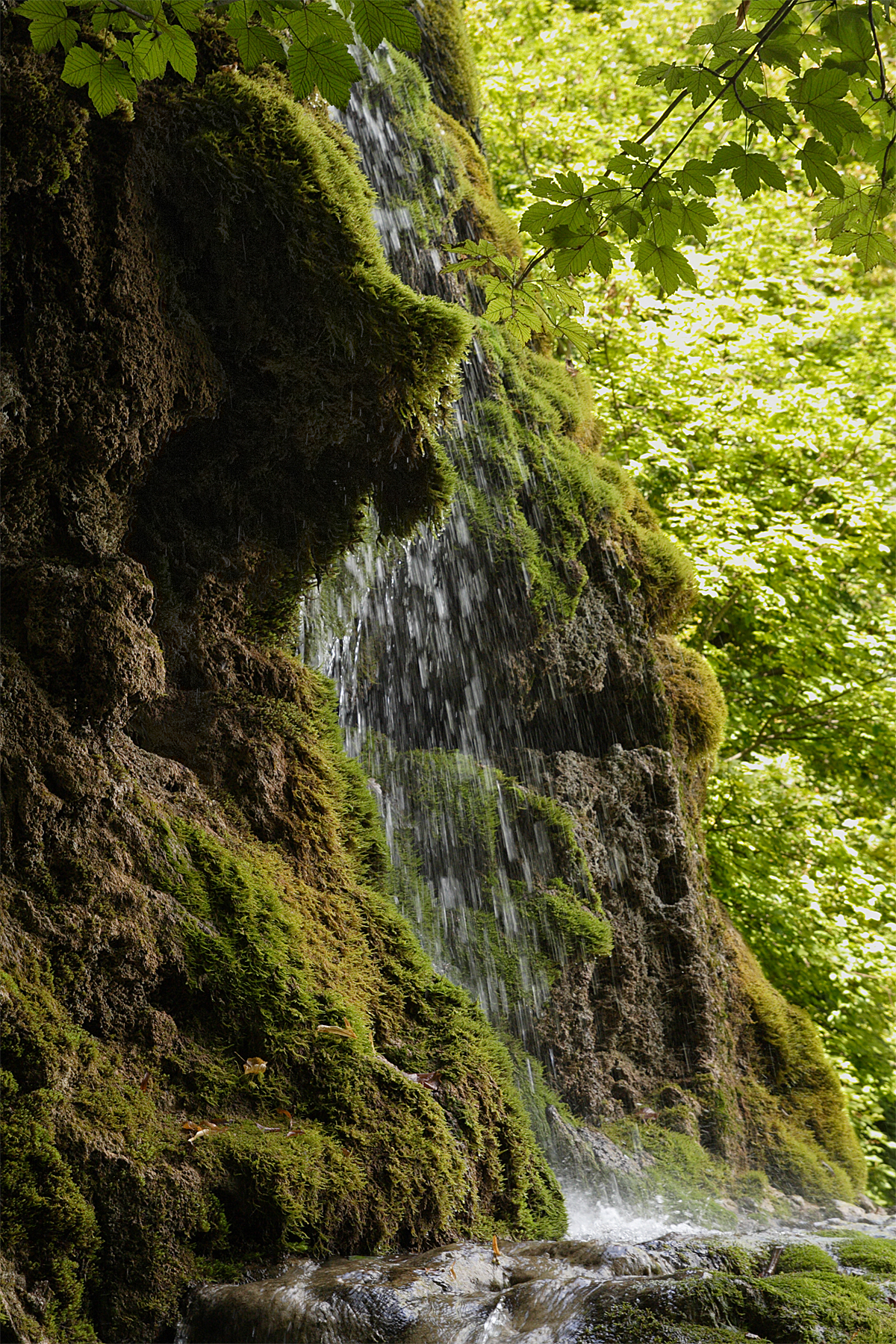
The Güterstein waterfalls

Most of the buildings were dismantled at the time of the Reformation apart from the burial chapel of the ruling house of Württemberg, the surviving monuments from which were taken in 1554 to St. George's Church in Tübingen. It is possible that the 1512 altar of the Passion in the parish church of Oberstenfeld came from Güterstein Charterhouse, but the evidence is inconclusive.

The site of the monastery next to the Güterstein waterfalls attracted exploitation because of the presence of tufa, which was quarried, and also because of the availability of spring water, which is used for the stud farm that now stands near the site.

== Sources ==
- Roland Deigendesch: Die Kartause Güterstein. Jan Thorbecke Verlag, Leinfelden 2001, ISBN 9783799552394 (Schriften zur südwestdeutschen Landeskunde. Bd. 39)
- Louise Pichler: Die Karthause. Verlag Otto Risch, Stuttgart c. 1890, (Erzählungen für die Jugend und das Volk. Band 14, 2nd ed.) (fictional portrayal)
- Peter Pfister: Klosterführer aller Zisterzienserklöster im deutschsprachigen Raum. Strasbourg, München 1998, p. 68
- Roland Deigendesch: Güterstein, in: Monasticon Cartusiense, ed. Gerhard Schlegel, James Hogg, Band 2, Salzburg 2004, pp. 394–405
- Güterstein in the database Klöster in Baden-Württemberg des Landesarchivs Baden-Württemberg
- Blätter des Schwäbischen Albvereins 2003 No 2 (online version)
