= PLGA (disambiguation) =

PLGA is poly(lactic-co-glycolic acid), a copolymer.

PLGA may also refer to:

- People's Liberation Guerrilla Army (India), the armed wing of the Communist Party of India (Maoist)
- Plastic land grid array, a type of surface-mount packaging for integrated circuits
- Polymorphous low-grade adenocarcinoma, a malignant salivary gland tumor

== See also ==
- LGA (disambiguation)
