= Hülsta =

German furniture manufacturer

hülsta-werke Hüls GmbH & Co. KG
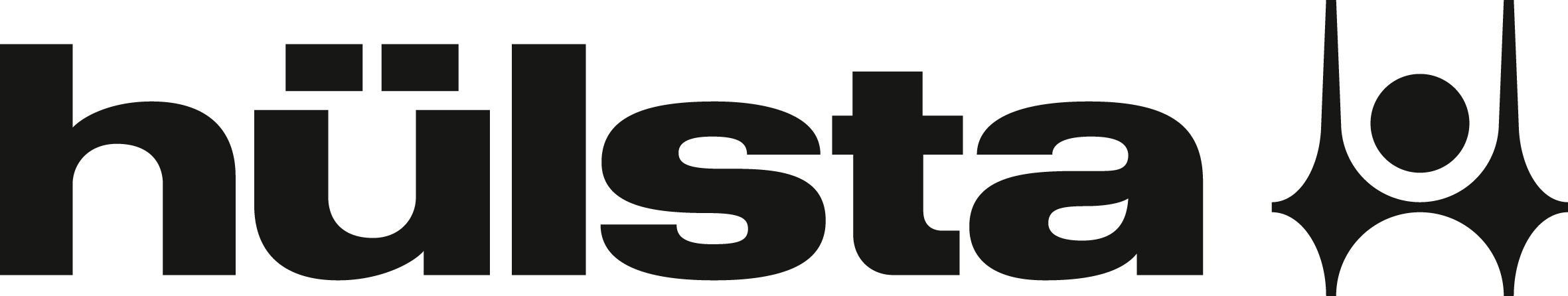
- Company type: GmbH & Co. KG
- Founded: 1940; 86 years ago
- Headquarters: Stadtlohn, Germany
- Area served: worldwide
- Key people: Dr. Thomas C. Knecht (CEO)
- Products: furniture
- Revenue: 253,8 M Euro (2010)
- Number of employees: 700
- Website: previously https://www.huelsta.com

hülsta-werke Hüls GmbH & Co. KG was a German furniture manufacturer with its headquarters in Stadtlohn, Germany. The company name hülsta (German pronunciation: [h yː l s t aː]) is derived from the name of the founder family Hüls and the company headquarters in Stadtlohn. It is a registered trademark. They filed for insolvency in 2024 and ceased operations on June 1st 2024.

The company was founded in 1940 as a small cabinetmaker's workshop in Stadtlohn (Germany, North Rhine-Westphalia) and is still a family-owned business located in the same place. The range of products is manufactured exclusively in Münsterland, where the Hüls Company Group has established a supply industry and distribution network via retailers all over the world.

hülsta is a part of the Hüls-Group.

== History ==
In 1940, Alois Hüls founded the company by opening a cabinetmaker’s workshop with 10 employees in Stadtlohn, Münsterland (North Rhine-Westphalia). In 1953 Karl Hüls, son of Alois Hüls, joined the company. The Hüls-Möbelwerke specialized in the production of bedroom furniture. In 1959, the brand name hülsta was established. In 1960, after graduating as a wood engineer, Karl Hüls took over the management of the company. In 1961, the hülsta brand was registered at the Patent Office in Munich.

In 1962, hülsta’s wardrobe system Intermat replaced the thus far conventional upper and lower cupboards by continuous doors. In 1964, the hülsta brand was protected by international copyright. hülsta opened a second production site in Heek (North Rhine-Westphalia, Münsterland). hülsta launched hülstamat, the first wardrobe featuring the add-on principle. In 1965, hülsta started to manufacture Rumat, the first base frame for mattresses. In 1967, hülsta opened a third production site in Ottenstein (North Rhine-Westphalia). "Allwand" was the first living room range in the market to feature the endless add-on principle with fronts in different heights. At the same time, the modular living room range "Universa" was designed. In 1969, the hülsta parent plant moved to the Wenningfeld industrial estate in Stadtlohn. In 1970, hülsta introduced a youth range to the market. Alois Hüls died on 28 April 1970.

The first edition of the interior design book “Vorbildlich Wohnen“ was published in 1975. In 1983, the company established a new training center for sales staff and fitters from the furniture trade at the headquarters in Stadtlohn.

In 1985, according to a Stern magazine brand study, hülsta was the best-known furniture brand in Germany in 1985 with a 58% level of recognition. In 1986, the company launched the home office range. In 1987 Karl Hüls was awarded the Bundesverdienstkreuz First Class.

In 1993, Ludwig Hüls, the third of four sons born to Gertrud and Karl Hüls, joined the hülsta-werke as overall Technical Director.

In 1994, under the name of now! by hülsta, hülsta were the first to launch furniture in the cash-and-carry sector. For the first time, the company became involved as a co-sponsor for the Gerry Weber Open ATP tennis tournament in Halle, for the first time. According to a Stern magazine brand study, hülsta achieved a recognition level of 49% in 1998.

In 2000, hülsta established the Soft-Technologies for automatic and silent closing of drawers and doors. In 2001, Karl Hüls was awarded the Großes Verdienstkreuz of the Federal Republic of Germany; he died on 5 October that year.

In 2002, by adding dining tables and chairs, hülsta extended its portfolio by the sector “Dining”. In 2003, the “Gerhart-Hauptmann-Straße“ in Stadtlohn was renamed “Karl-Hüls-Straße“. In 2004, hülsta became the first and only furniture manufacturer to be awarded the quality seal "Premium Qualität" by the Bavarian LGA. The company was included in the compendium "Marken des Jahrhunderts" (Brands of the Century).

In 2007 the initiative "Deutschland - Land der Ideen" (Germany – Country of Ideas) under the patronage of President of Germany Horst Köhler awarded hülsta the "Ausgewählter Ort 2007" (Selected Site 2007). The furniture manufacturer was one of 365 organisations, one for every day of the year, which is meant to represent innovative power and sustainability in Germany.

In the course of a period of restructuring in 2008/2009 hülsta merged two factories and, according to company information, outsourced a part of the production, such as veneer production and cutting. During the restructuring program, some suppliers took on hülsta employees. A veneer plant that is part of the group took over the work of several smaller suppliers.

To mark the 70th anniversary of the brand in 2010, an international print and radio campaign was carried out. The hülsta-werke are managed by the third generation of the Hüls family. Ludwig Hüls is responsible as Technical Managing Director.

== Production and sales ==
Under the brand names of hülsta and now! by hülsta the hülsta-werke design, manufacture, and distribute furniture for all areas of the home. The hülsta brand is aimed at the premium furniture trade whilst now! by hülsta has been designed for “Young Living”. hülsta furniture is sold by 300 retailers. The product range is displayed in a 6,000 m² showroom at the headquarters in Stadtlohn. Further showrooms are Located in London, Moscow, Shanghai and Dubai. The company’s main export markets are Europe and Asia (predominantly China and India).

== Marketing ==
hülsta invests around 6% of its turnover (2009) in Advertising and Sales Promotions. The Marketing mix includes lifestyle-oriented interior design books, printed adverts and inserts in the national and international press as well as the internet. In 2003 and 2006, the company ran two TV-campaigns.

The core target group for the hülsta brand are potential buyers aged 40+, who appreciate durable, timeless furniture of the medium and upper price ranges. Featuring cash-and-carry furniture, the "now! by hülsta" range primarily targets first-time buyers aged 28 to 35 years. Both brands are marketed independently.

Furthermore, the furniture manufacturer organizes planning events for its retailers. The headquarters in Stadtlohn host the “Days of Living”, which are aimed at both, the trade and the end-users.

The marketing-mix also includes sponsoring activities in art, music, and sport. According to a survey, hülsta is Europe's best-known furniture manufacturer brand(source: GfK, Nuremberg). In the meantime, the level of recognition in the German market reached approximately 60% and 80% in the premium segment. (source Allensbach Institute).

== Corporate design ==
The hülsta company brand logo consists of the word "hülsta" in black letters on a white background and a stylized H in white on black background. For “now! by hülsta” the words "now! by hülsta" is used in white on a black background. The brand name is spelled in small letters, whilst capital letters are used for the range names of the conventional hülsta collection.

== Patents ==
hülsta owns more than 220 national and international patents for inventions in the furniture sector. They include the softened automatic pull-in device for drawers based on smoothly running guide rails featuring quadro ball bearings, which hülsta sells under the name of "hülsta-SoftFlow". In 2008, hülsta registered a patent for a high-gloss lacquer surface that hardens withinseconds under UV light. The EverGloss lacquering technology set a new benchmark for the durability of high-gloss surfaces.

== Awards ==
The hülsta product portfolio has been awarded the "Blaue Engel" (Blue Angel) label and the "Premium Qualität" (Premium Quality) quality sign by the Bavarian LGA. In 1982, eleven products received the mark "good" from the Stiftung Warentest. Test winners were the "All Flex" base frame in 1999, the "Xpert" children's an youth desk ( marked "very good") in 2006, and the "Top Point 4000" mattress in 2009.
