= Buxheim Charterhouse =

Carthusian monastery in Bavaria, Germany

Coordinates: 47°59′58″N 10°08′02″E

Imperial Charterhouse of Buxheim Reichskartause Buxheim
- 1548–1802
- Coat of arms
- Status: Imperial Abbey
- Capital: Buxheim Charterhouse
- Government: Theocracy
- Historical era: Middle Ages
  - Charterhouse founded: 10th century
  - Donated to Carthusians: 1402 1548
  - Looted and abandoned during German Peasants' War: 1524–25
  - Occupied by Memmingen during Schmalkaldic War: 1546–47
  - Granted immediacy from Charles V at Augsburg: 1548
  - Secularised to Ostein: 1802
  - Ostein inherited by Bassenheim: 1809
Preceded by	Succeeded by
Memmingen	County of Ostein
- Today part of: Germany

Buxheim Charterhouse (German: Reichskartause Buxheim) was formerly a monastery of the Carthusians (the largest charterhouse in Germany) and is now a monastery of the Salesians. It is situated in Buxheim near Memmingen in Bavaria.

== History ==
The estate of Buxheim belonged from the mid-10th century to the chapter of Augsburg Cathedral, who in about 1100 founded a house of canons here, dedicated to the Virgin Mary.

In 1402, after a long period of decline, in an extreme move to preserve it the then provost, Heinrich von Ellerbach, gave the establishment to the Carthusians, a move which proved extremely successful in reviving Buxheim both spiritually and economically. Its wealth however drew the hostile attentions of the nearby city of Memmingen, which occupied the monastery in 1546 during the Reformation, and impounded its property. Prior Dietrich Loher was able by skilful diplomacy to obtain the favour of Emperor Charles V, and in 1548 the monastery was declared reichsfrei, and thus independent of all territorial authority save that of the Emperor himself, under whose protection it stood; it was the only charterhouse (Reichskartause) in Germany ever to be granted that status.

It was dissolved in the secularisation of 1802, when ownership passed first to the Counts of Ostein, who allowed the community to remain, and then in 1809 by inheritance to the Counts Waldbott von Bassenheim, who from 1812 used the premises as a castle. In 1916 the state took over the buildings, which in 1926 were acquired by the Salesians.

== Buildings ==
Parts of the monastery buildings were refurbished by Dominikus Zimmermann in the Rococo style: the monastic church, St. Anne's chapel in the cloisters, and also the nearby parish church.

== The Buxheim Carvings ==
A masterpiece of Baroque carving, the choir stalls in the chapel with their rich ornament and figurative decoration, known as the Buxheim Carvings, are still almost complete. Created between 1687 and 1691 by the Tyrolean sculptor and woodcarver Ignaz Waibl, they are of international significance. The carvings have a varied history. They were sold to a Governor of the Bank of England and subsequently installed in St. Saviour's Hospital, Osnaburgh Street, London, while it was run by the Community of the Epiphany, an order of Anglican nuns. The sisters later withdrew to Cornwall and their work was taken over by another Anglican order, the Community of the Presentation. In 1960 the sisters relocated to their other convent at Hythe, Kent, taking the carvings with them. The community dwindled in size and was forced to hand the hospital over to a charitable trust. The sisters decided to return the carvings to Buxheim, which finally took place in the early 1980s. The Reverend Mother of the Presentation Sisters attended a special repatriation ceremony, and was awarded the Freedom of the City of Buxheim, only the second person ever to receive that honour.

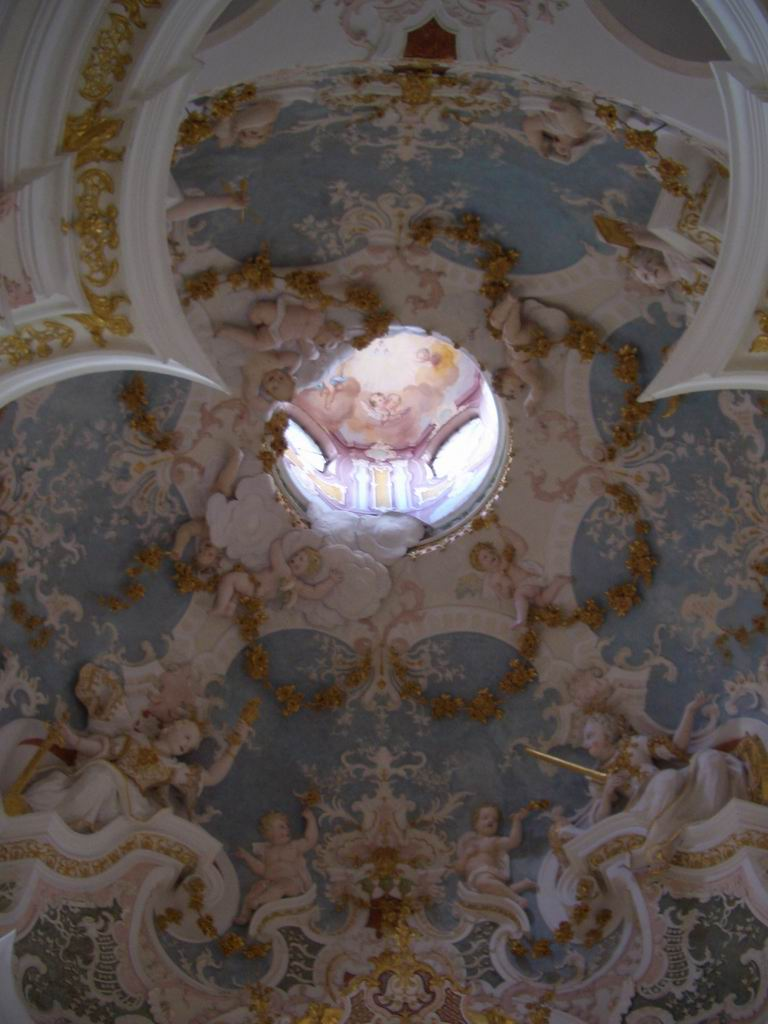
St. Anne's Chapel, by Dominikus Zimmermann

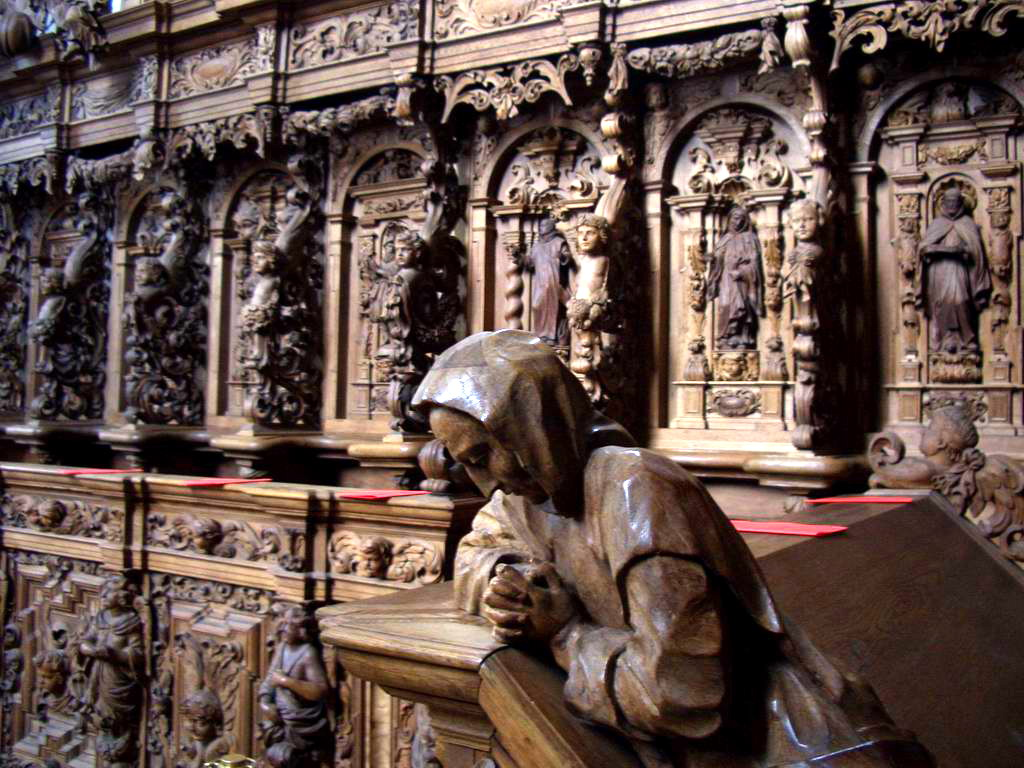
Choir stalls, St. Anne's Chapel, by Ignaz Waibl

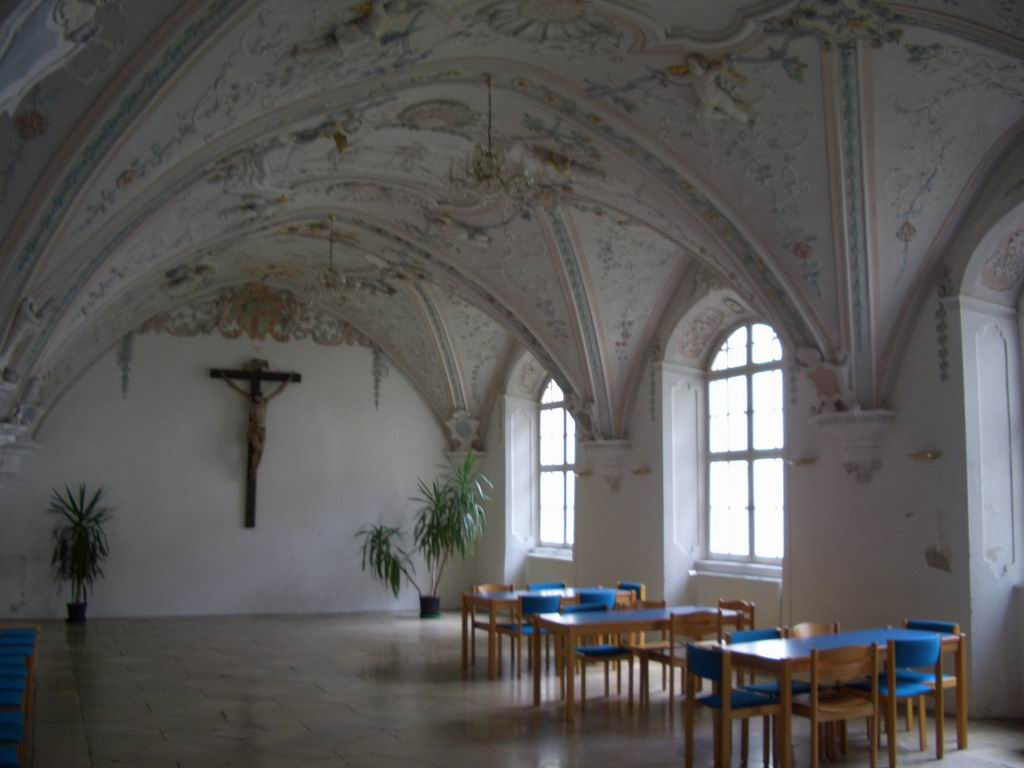
Refectory, with Rococo stucco ceiling
