= Ignaz Waibl =

Austrian artist

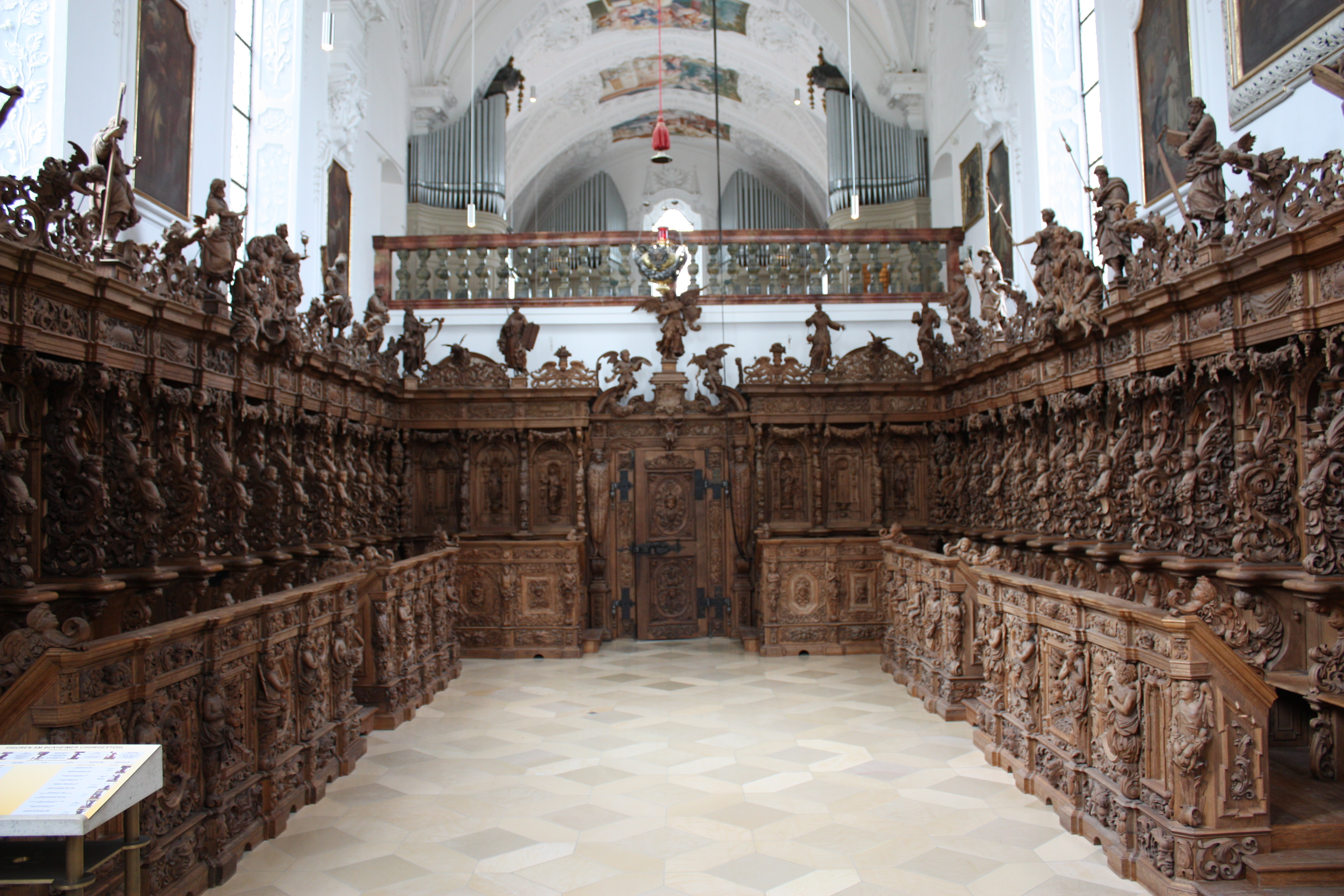
The choir stalls of Buxheim Charterhouse, one of Ignaz Waibl's greatest works

Ignaz Waibl otherwise Ignatzius Woibl or Waibel (1661 – 28 February 1733) was an Austrian woodcarver. His carvings are among the most significant of the period.

== Life ==
Waibl was born in Grins near Landeck in the Tyrol, son of Thomas Waibl or Waibel and his wife Eva (formerly Wucherer). He was apprenticed to Melchior Lechleitner, and finished his apprenticeship after 5 years, in 1681.

In 1683 he made the Angel Altar in the parish church of Saint George and Saint Nicholas in Oetz in the Tyrol. He was commissioned by Prior Johannes Bilstein to create the carvings of the choir stalls of Buxheim Charterhouse in Buxheim, Upper Swabia, from 1687 to 1691. For the same monastery from 1699 to 1700 Waibl carved the celebrant's chair and two side altars. His works for Buxheim are among the most important Baroque wood sculptures.

In about 1705 he was involved with several others on the refurbishment of the deanery church of Breitenwang in Reutte in the Tyrol. This is the only substantial corpus of his work in his native Tyrol.

From no later than 1708 (and quite possibly earlier) he lived in Heimertingen in Upper Swabia in Germany, a few kilometres from Buxheim Charterhouse. He died in Heimertingen on 28 February 1733.

== Selected works ==
- Saint Afra (sculpture in the parish church of Reutte, Tyrol)
- The Mouth of Hell (predella in the parish church of St. George and St. Nicholas, Oetz, Tyrol)
- Choir stalls of Buxheim Charterhouse
- The Good Shepherd in the choir of the church of Saint Ulrich in Amendingen

== Sources ==
- Ignaz Waibl in Ulrich Thieme, Felix Becker u. a.: Allgemeines Lexikon der Bildenden Künstler von der Antike bis zur Gegenwart. Band XXXV, E. A. Seemann, Leipzig 1942, p. 61
