= LGA (disambiguation) =

LGA or lga may refer to:

- Labor–Green Accord (1989), a political agreement between Australian parties
- Land grid array, a microprocessor surface-mount package
- Landesgewerbeanstalt Bayern, a German certification company
- Lansing Grand River Assembly, a General Motors automobile assembly plant
- Large for gestational age, a medical condition
- Lattice gas automaton, a type of cellular automaton
- Local government area, in several countries
- Local Government Association, England and Wales
- Local government areas of Nigeria, the second-level administrative division of Nigeria
- Lungga language, Solomon Islands (ISO 639-3 code: lga)
- LaGuardia Airport, United States (IATA code: LGA)
