= Christgarten Charterhouse =

Former monastery in Bavaria, Germany

Coordinates: 48°46′56″N 10°27′48″E

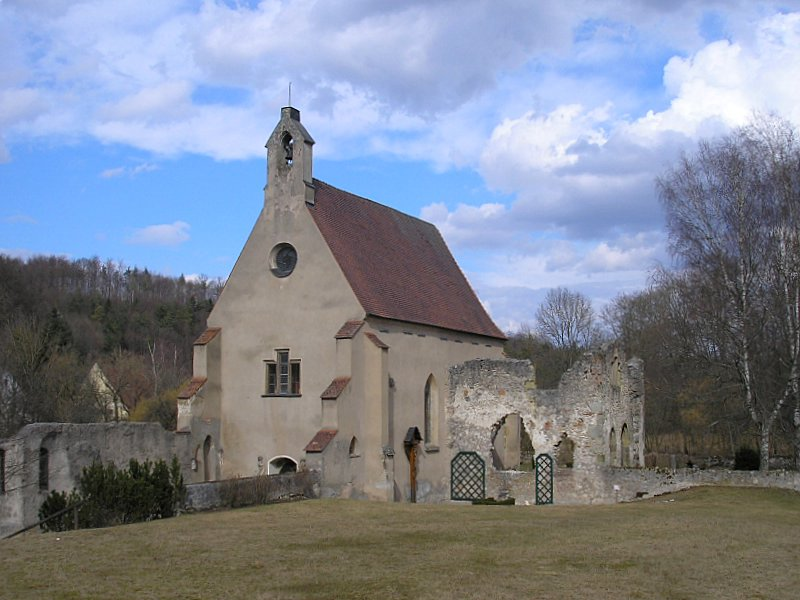
Christgarten church from the north-west

Christgarten Charterhouse (German: Kloster Christgarten) is a former Carthusian monastery, or charterhouse, near Ederheim in Bavaria, Germany.

== History ==
The monastery, dedicated to Saint Peter, was founded in 1383 by Counts Ludwig and Friedrich von Oettingen. From 1525 the counts of Oettingen supported the Reformation, and from 1558 Carthusian monks from Christgarten were called to be Protestant ministers. In the course of the Reformation the prior of Hürnheim (near Ederheim) also converted to the new teaching and from then on ministered to Christgarten in a Reformist spirit.

Nevertheless, the charterhouse was not dissolved until after the Thirty Years' War, in 1649. In 1656 the bell tower was demolished; further buildings followed in the 18th and 19th centuries. All that remained of the monastic church was the choir, which was used as the Protestant parish church. The "Scheuffelin altar" was given to the Alte Pinakothek in Munich.

== Sources and external links ==
- Klöster in Bayern: Christgarten (in German) (and all available information as a pdf: PDF (8 KB) (in German))
- Haus der Bayrischen Geschichte: Klöster in Bayern: Christgarten (in German)
