= Buxheim =

- Municipality
- Coat of arms

- Location of Buxheim within Eichstätt district
- Interactive map of Buxheim
- Location within Germany Location within Bavaria
- Coordinates: 48°47′N 11°18′E
- Country: Germany
- State: Bavaria
- Admin. region: Oberbayern
- District: Eichstätt

Government
  - Mayor (2023–29): Benedikt Bauer (SPD)

Area
  - Total: 22.53 km^{2} (8.70 sq mi)
- Elevation: 495 m (1,624 ft)

Population (2025-12-31)
  - Total: 3,771
  - Density: 167.4/km^{2} (433.5/sq mi)
- Time zone: UTC+01:00 (CET)
  - Summer (DST): UTC+02:00 (CEST)
- Postal codes: 85114
- Dialling codes: 08458
- Vehicle registration: EI

Buxheim (German pronunciation: [ˈbʊkshaɪm]) is a municipality in the district of Eichstätt in Bavaria in Germany.
