= Landesgewerbeanstalt Bayern =

Landesgewerbeanstalt Bayern (LGA) is a certification company based in Nuremberg, Germany. It specializes in toy and furniture testing.

== History ==
It traces its history back to the late 1860s where it began as a portal where companies could gain experience of the latest technology. Since 1 January 2007 it belongs to the TÜV Rheinland group.
