= List of Carthusian monasteries =

This is a list of Carthusian monasteries, or charterhouses, containing both extant and dissolved monasteries of the Carthusians (also known as the Order of Saint Bruno) for monks and nuns, arranged by location under their present countries. Also listed are ancillary establishments (distilleries, printing houses) and the "houses of refuge" used by the communities expelled from France in the early 20th century.

Since the establishment of the Carthusians in 1084 there have been more than 280 monastic foundations and several more unsuccessfully attempted ones, and this list aims to be complete. Dates of foundation and suppression are given where known. As of August 2025 there are 21 extant charterhouses, 16 for monks and 5 for nuns, indicated by bold type.

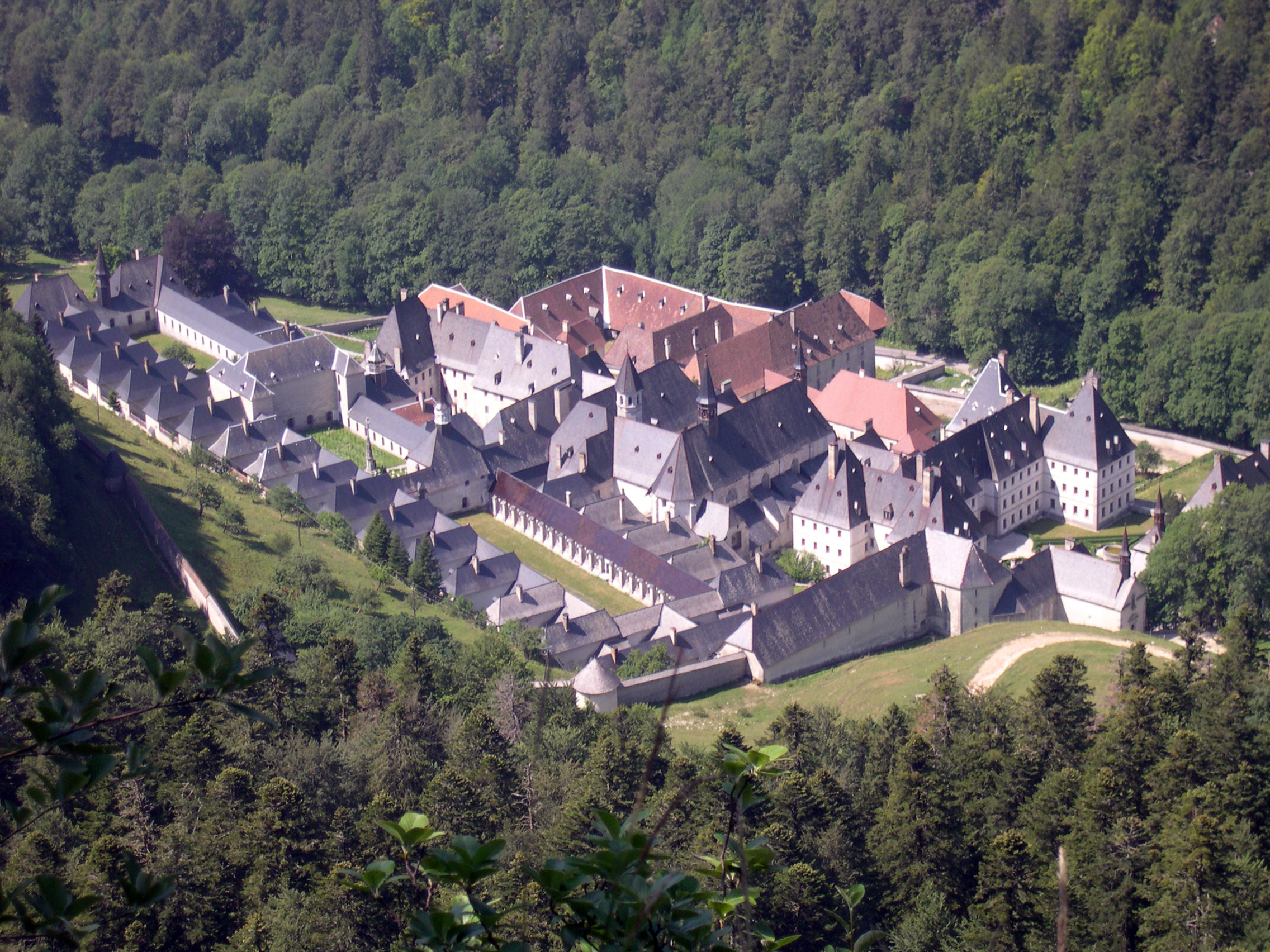
La Grande Chartreuse, from which the Carthusian Order took its name, mother house of all charterhouses

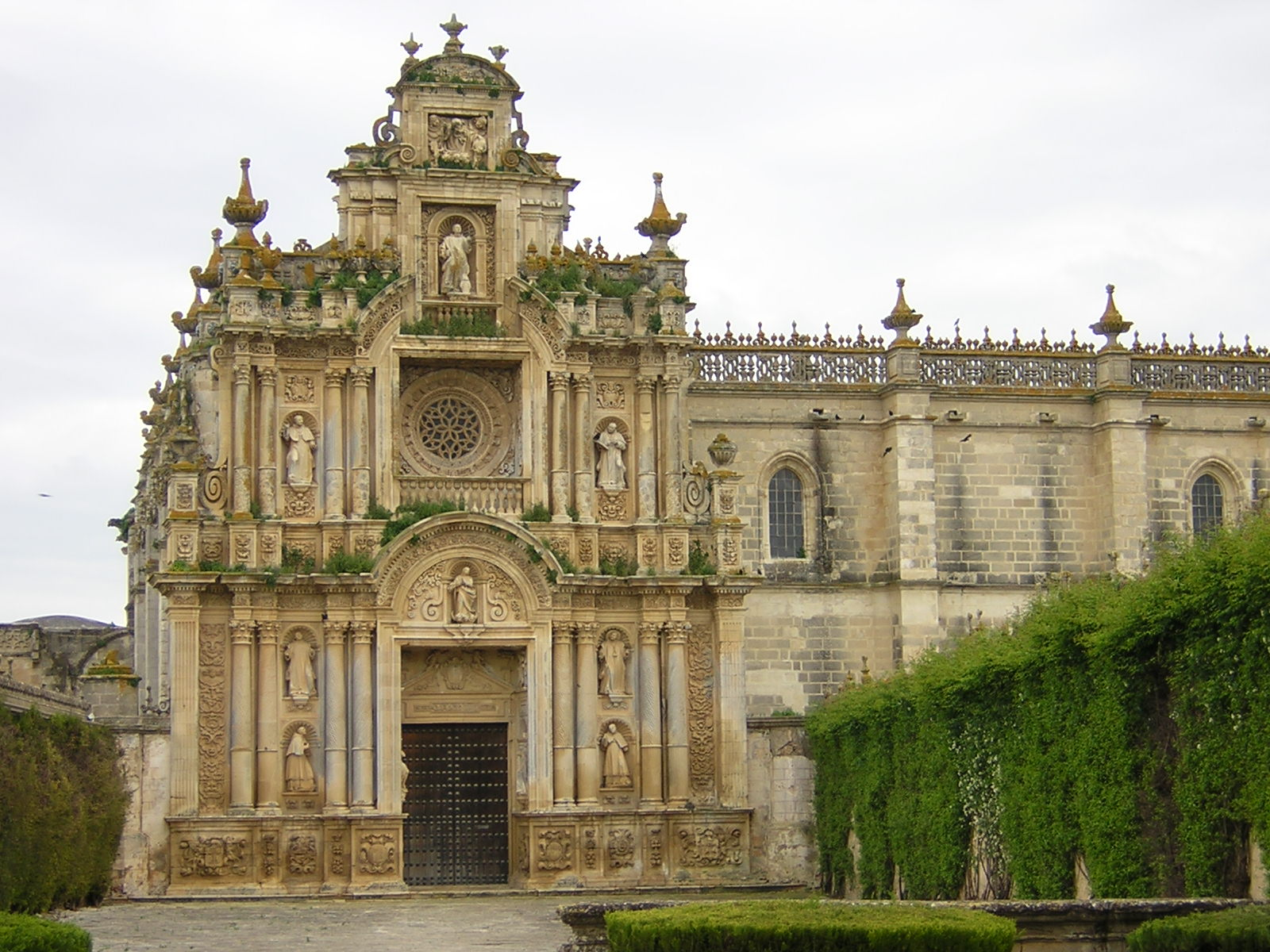
Charterhouse at Jerez de la Frontera

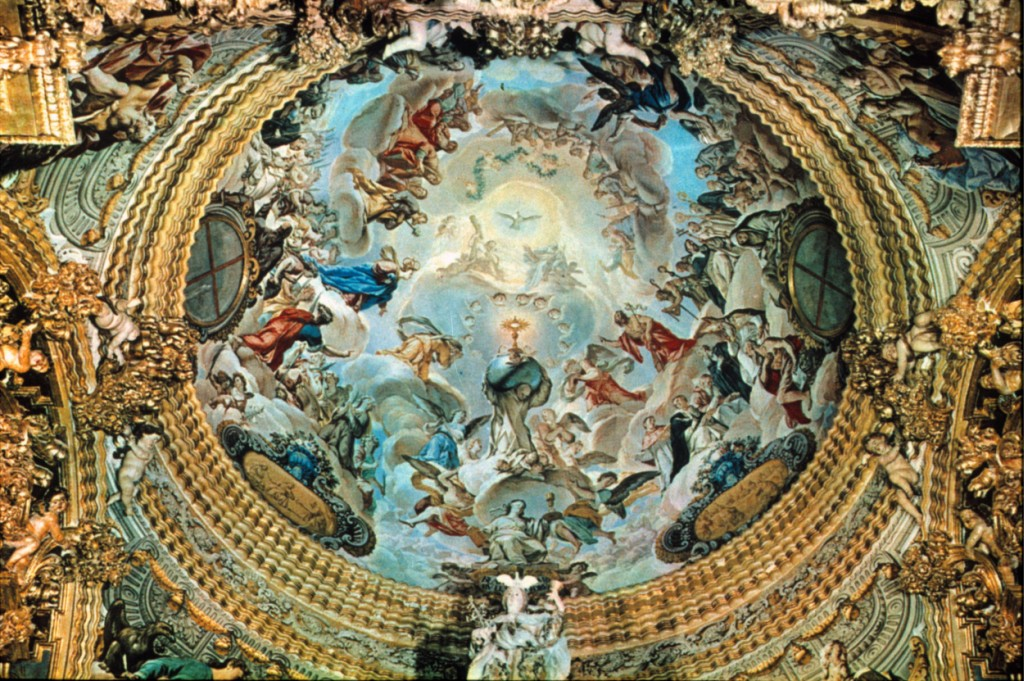
Granada Charterhouse

== Europe ==
=== Austria ===
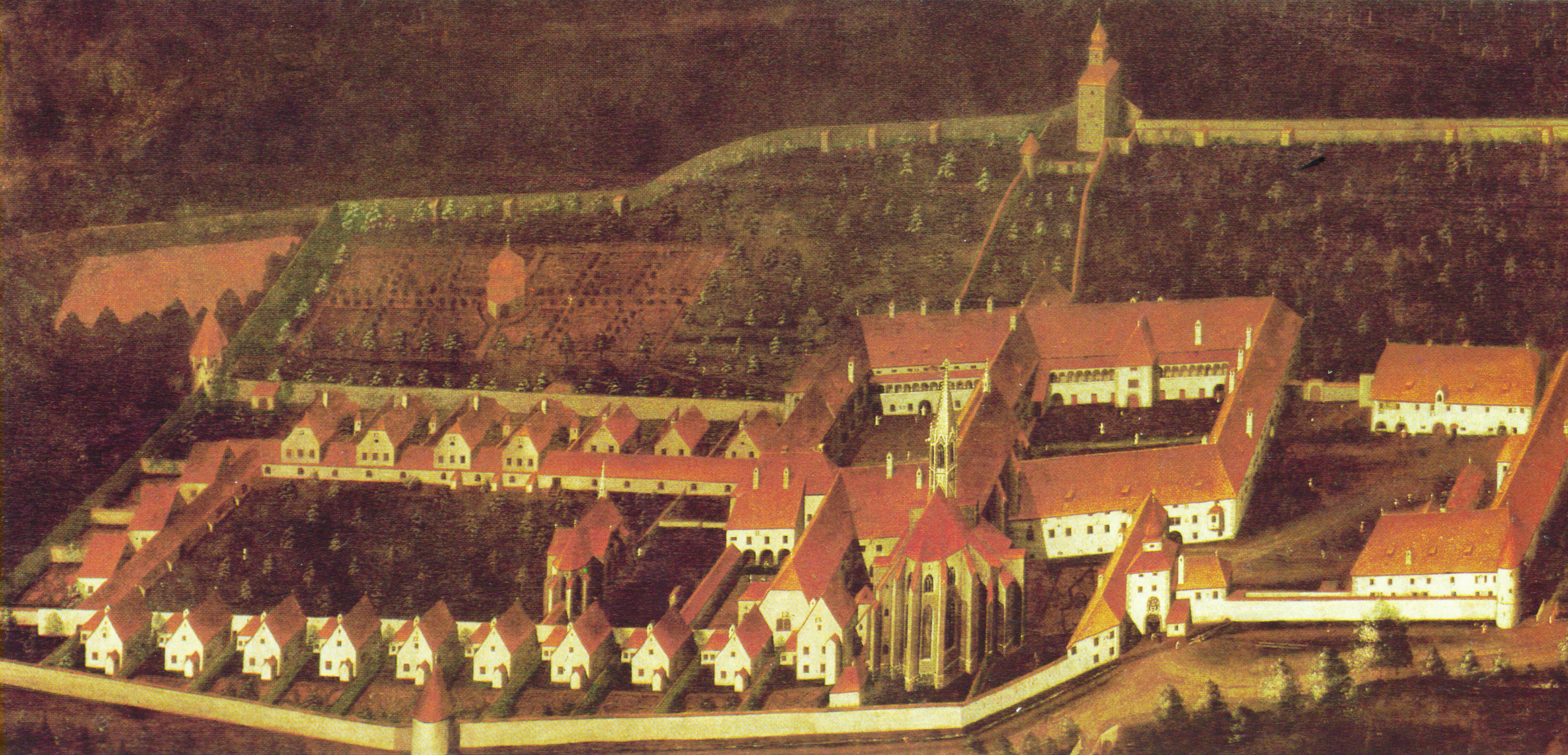
Gaming Charterhouse, original building

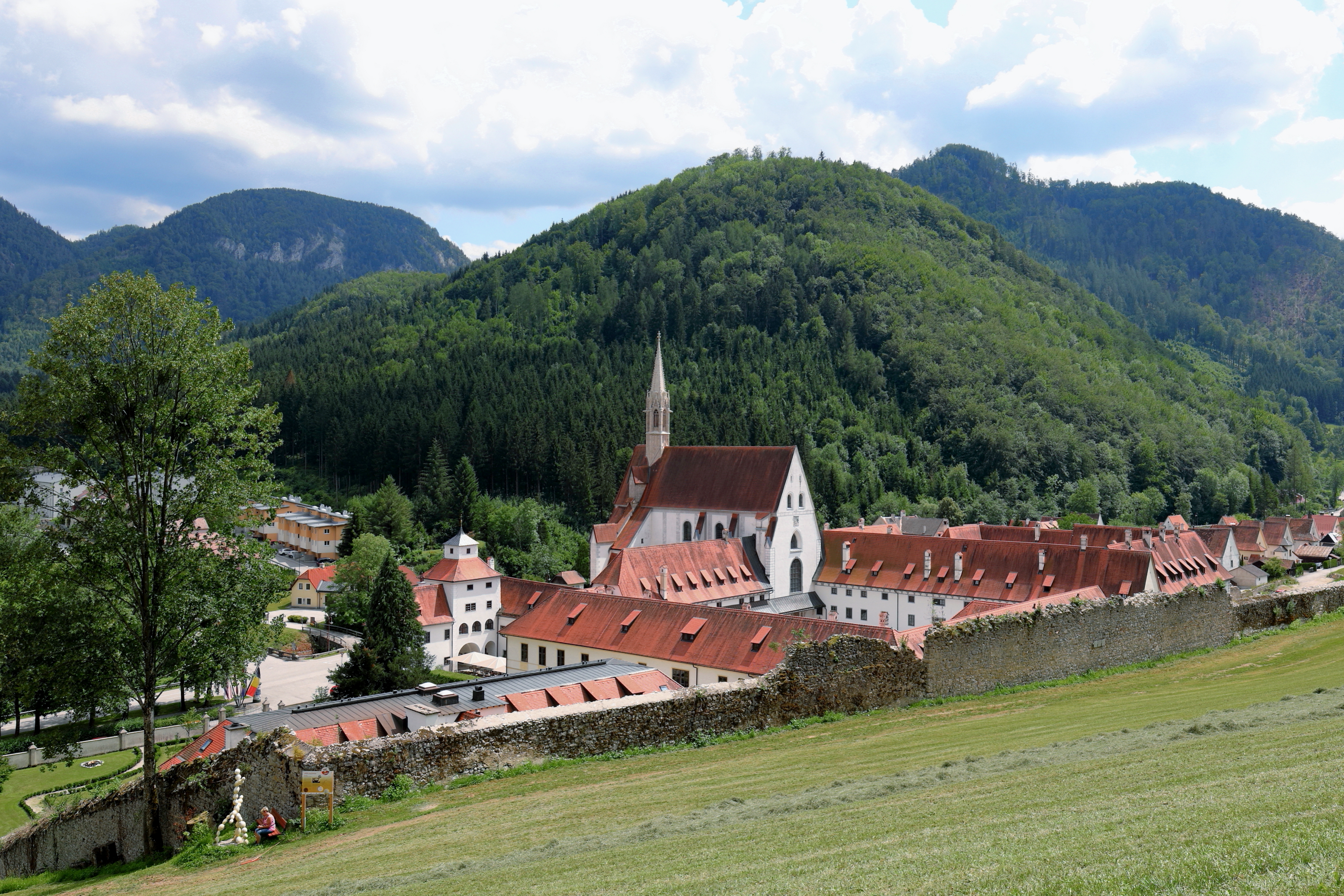
Gaming Charterhouse

- Aggsbach Charterhouse (Kartause Aggsbach or Kartause Marienpforte) in Aggsbach, Lower Austria (1380–1782)
- Gaming Charterhouse (Kartause Gaming or Kartause Maria Thron) in Gaming, Lower Austria (1330–1782)
- Mauerbach Charterhouse (Kartause Mauerbach) in Mauerbach near Vienna, Lower Austria (1313–1782)

=== Belarus ===
- Biaroza Charterhouse, Biaroza, formerly Biaroza-Kartuskaja (1648–1831)

=== Belgium ===
- Antwerp:
  - St. Catherine's Charterhouse, Antwerp, also known as Kiel Charterhouse (Kartuize t’Kiel or Kartuize Sint-Katharina-op-de-Berg-Sinai) (1324–1543, when relocated to Lier)
  - St. Sophia's Charterhouse, Antwerp (Kartuize Sint-Sophia, Antwerpen) (1625–1783)
  - see also Sheen Anglorum
- Bruges, see (1) Genadedal; and (2) Sheen Anglorum
- Brussels Charterhouse (Kartuize Onze-Lieve-Vrouwe van Gratie), Brussels (1588–1783; transferred from Scheut)
- Chercq, see Mont-Saint-Andre
- Diest, see Zelem
- Enghien, see Herne
- Genadedal or Genadendal Charterhouse (Kartuize Genadedal or Genadendal), Sint-Kruis (1383–1584); relocated to Bruges (1584–1783)
- Ghent Charterhouse, otherwise Charterhouse of Sint-Bruno in Eremo (Kartuize Sint-Bruno in Eremo), Ghent (1584–1783); successor to Koningsdal.
- Herne Charterhouse (Kartuize Onze-Lieve-Vrouwe-Kapelle), Herne (Flemish Brabant) near Enghien (Hainaut) (1314–1783)
- Koningsdal Charterhouse (Kartuize Koningsdal or 's-Koningsdale; Chartreuse Val-Royal), Rooigem (1328–1578); after a temporary refuge in Saint-Omer, relocated to Ghent (1584–1783)
- Kortrijk, see Koningsdal
- Leuven Charterhouse otherwise Louvain Charterhouse (Chartreuse Sainte-Marie-Madeleine-sous-la-Croix; Kartuize Maria-Magdalena-onder-het-Kruis op de Calvarieberg), Leuven (c. 1489/91–1783)
  - see also Sheen Anglorum
- Liège Charterhouse, also known as Mont Cornillon Charterhouse (Chartreuse des douze apôtres du Mont-Cornillon or Kartuize Twaalf Apostelen op de Mont Cornillon), Liège (1357–1796)
- Lier Charterhouse (Kartuize Sint-Katharina-op-de-Berg-Sinai), Lier (Antwerp) (1543–1783; transferred from Kiel, Antwerp)
- Malines, see Sheen Anglorum
- Mont-Saint-André Charterhouse (Kartuize Sint-Andreasberg or Chartreuse Mont-Saint-André), Chercq near Tournai (c. 1376/77–1783)
- Namur, see Sheen Anglorum
- Nieuwpoort Charterhouse, also known as Sheen Anglorum (Kartuize Nieuwpoort) (1626–1783; in other towns in Belgium from 1559): see Sheen Anglorum
- Scheut Charterhouse (Kartuize Onze-Lieve-Vrouwe van Gratie), Scheut near Anderlecht (1454–1588; relocated in Brussels)
- Sheen Anglorum Charterhouse (Charterhouse of Jesus of Bethlehem): English Carthusians in exile, located successively in Bruges (Val-de-Grâce) (1559–69), Bruges (Sinte-Clarastraat) (1569–1578), Namur (1578), Louvain (1578–1589), Antwerp (1589/90–1591), Malines (1591–1626) and Nieuwpoort (1626–1783)
- Sint-Martens-Bosch Charterhouse or Sint-Martens-Lierde Charterhouse (Kartuize Sint-Martens-Bosch or Sint-Martens-Lierde) Sint-Martens-Lierde, Geraardsbergen (1329–1783)
- Tournai, the order's printing press: transferred to Parkminster (1913–1954)
- Zelem Charterhouse, also Diest Charterhouse (Kartuize Sint-Jansberg or Sint-Jansdal), Zelem, Diest (1328–1796)
- Zepperen Castle, Sint-Truiden (1901–1905; house of refuge for exiled French community from Glandier)

=== Czech Republic ===
- Brno Charterhouse, Královo Pole Charterhouse, or Königsfeld Charterhouse (Holy Trinity), Brno (1370–1782)
- Dolany Charterhouse (Our Lady of the Valley of Jehosaphat), Dolany near Olomouc (1389–1437; moved here from Tržek (Litomyšl); moved to Olomouc in 1437, when the monastery at Dolany was ruined by Hussites)
- Litomyšl, see Tržek
- Mariengarten, see Prague
- Olomouc Charterhouse (Our Lady of the Valley of Jehosaphat), Olomouc (1437–1782; settled by the displaced community from Dolany)
- Poděbrady Charterhouse, at Poděbrady near Prague (1360–1369)
- Prague Charterhouse (Kartause Mariengarten), Smichow, Prague (1342–1419)
- Štípa Charterhouse, near Fryšták, Zlín (Moravia) (1617–1620; destroyed by Protestants during Thirty Years' War; refounded at Walditz)
- Tržek Charterhouse (Kartause Mariae Dornbusch [Our Lady of the Thornbush]), Tržek near Litomyšl (Bohemia) (1378–1390; moved to Dolany)
- Valdice, or Kartouzy-Valdice Charterhouse (Kartause Marienfeld, later Mariae Himmelfahrt), Valdice near Jičín (Bohemia) (1627–1782; settled by the displaced community from Štípa)

=== Denmark ===
- Asserbo Charterhouse, to the north of Roskilde (1162 or 1163–c.1169; site abandoned)
- Elvedgaard Charterhouse, Søndersø, island of Fyn (proposed 1475; not proceeded with because of insufficient endowment, and proposed instead as a hospital of the Order of the Holy Ghost, apparently also not proceeded with)
- Glenstrup Charterhouse, Glenstrup, Mariagerfjord (Benedictine monks; Carthusian foundation here proposed c. 1428–30, but formally abandoned for lack of funds in 1446. The project was for a time under the management of the Bishop of Aarhus, and the proposed charterhouse here was also sometimes referred to as Aarhus Charterhouse).

=== France ===
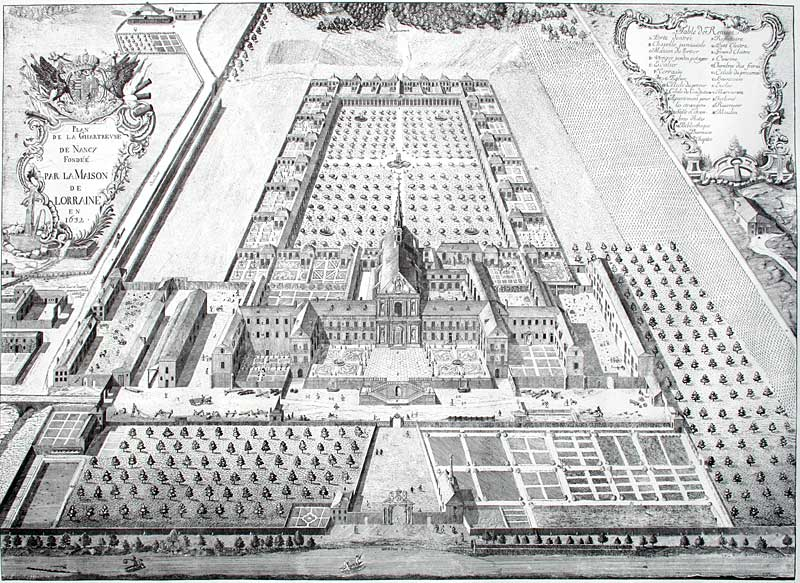
Bosserville Charterhouse

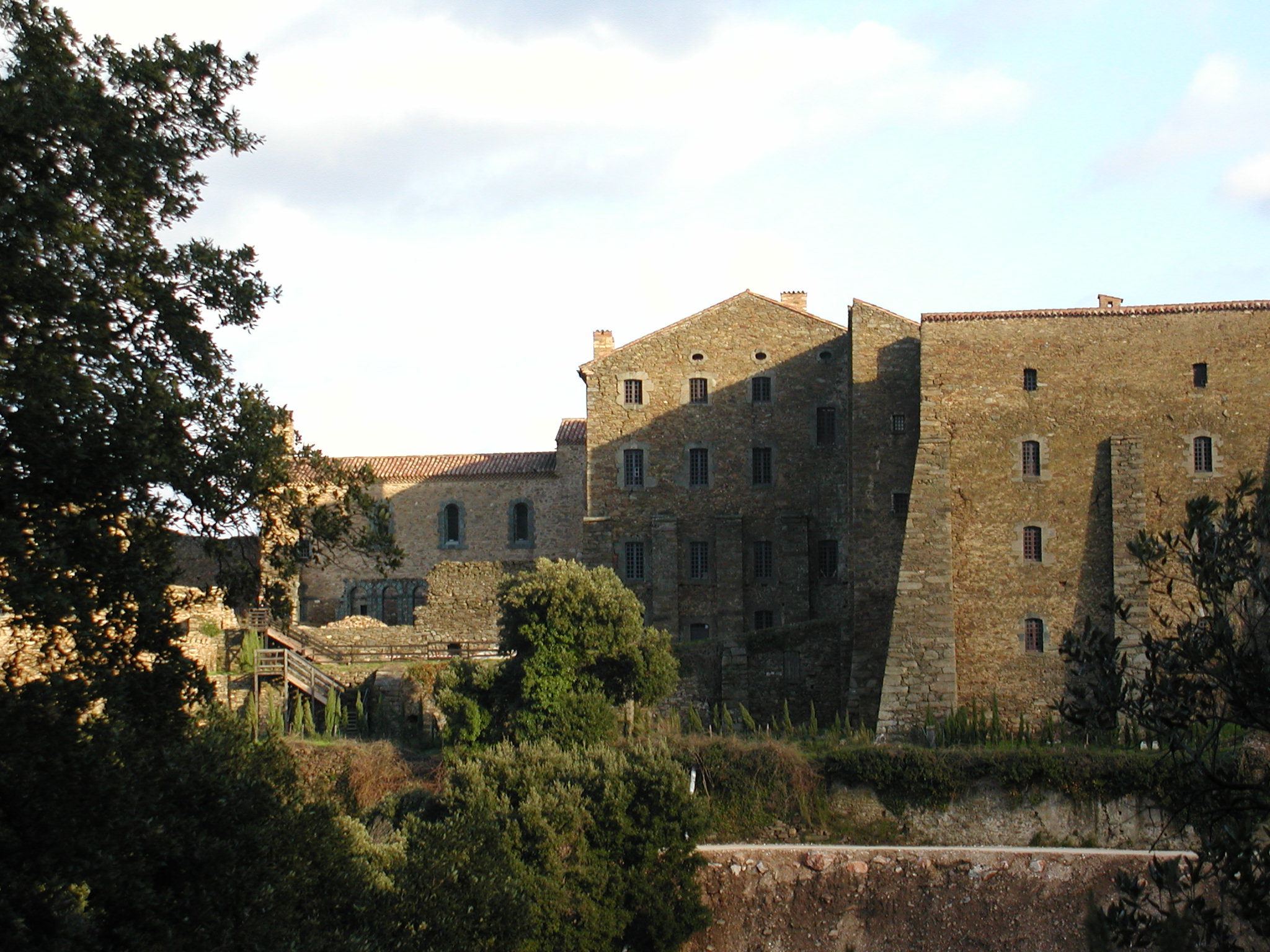
La Verne Charterhouse

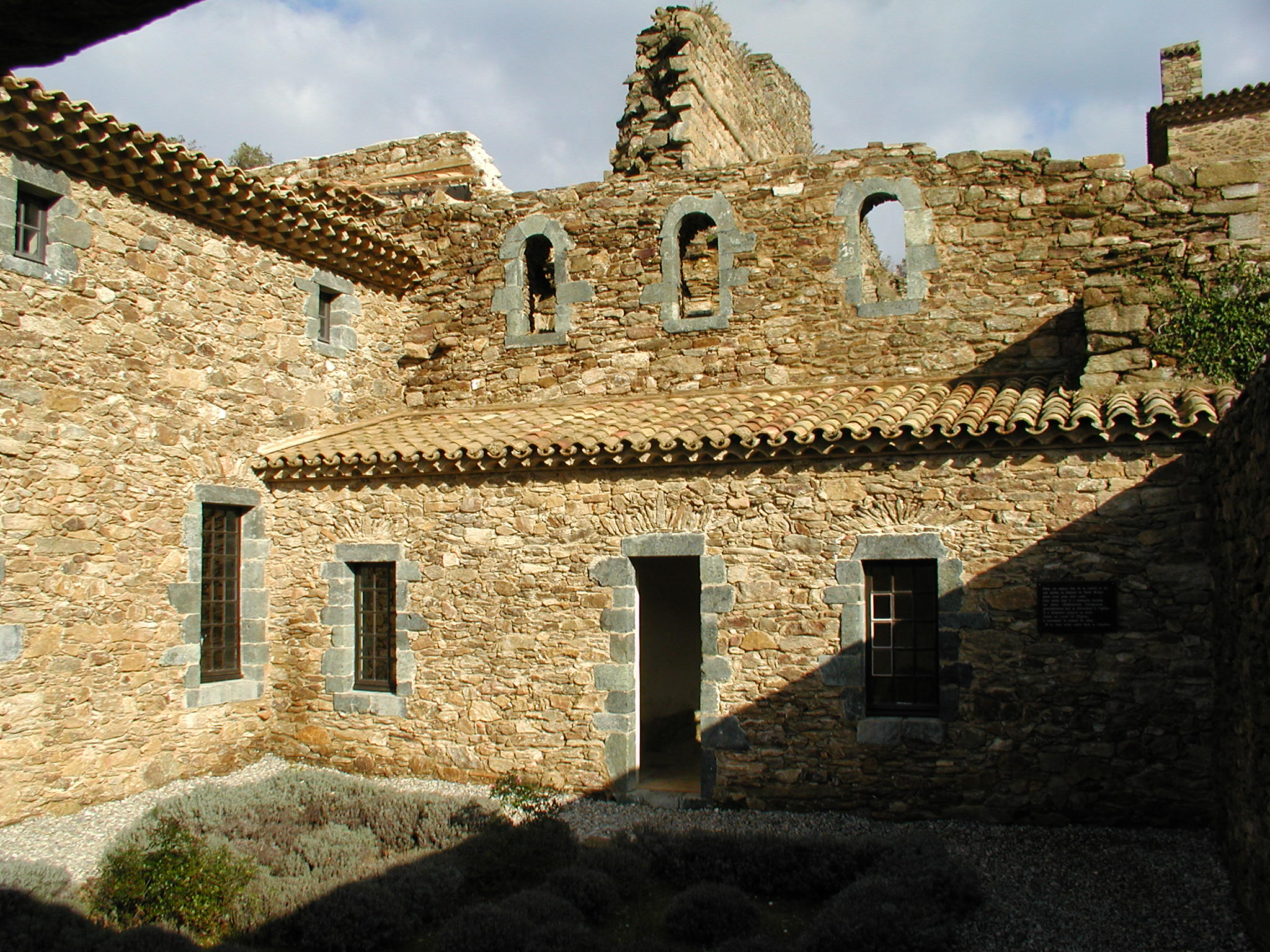
La Verne Charterhouse, ruins of a monk's house

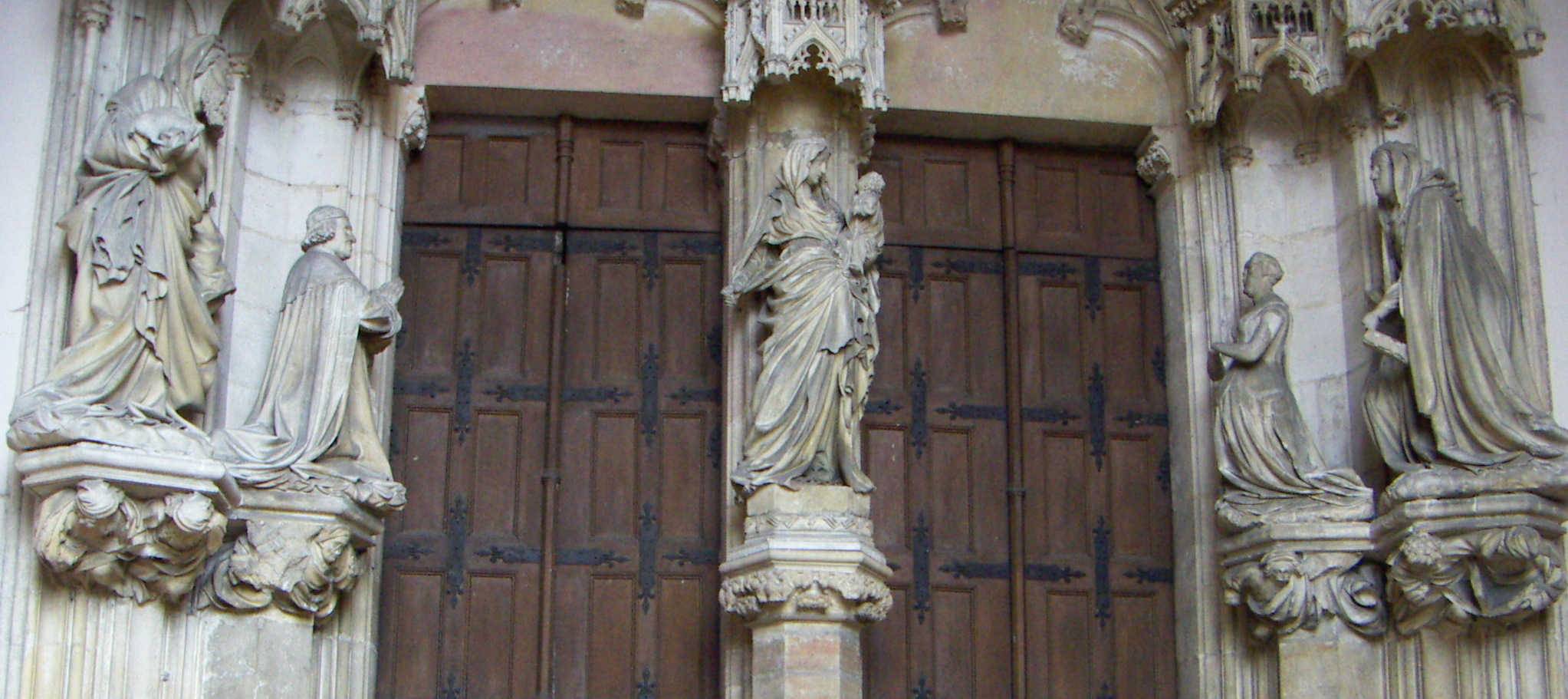
Champmol Charterhouse, church portal

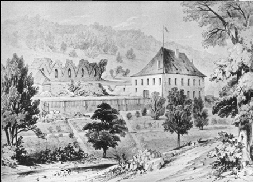
Le Glandier Charterhouse in Beyssac, about 1840

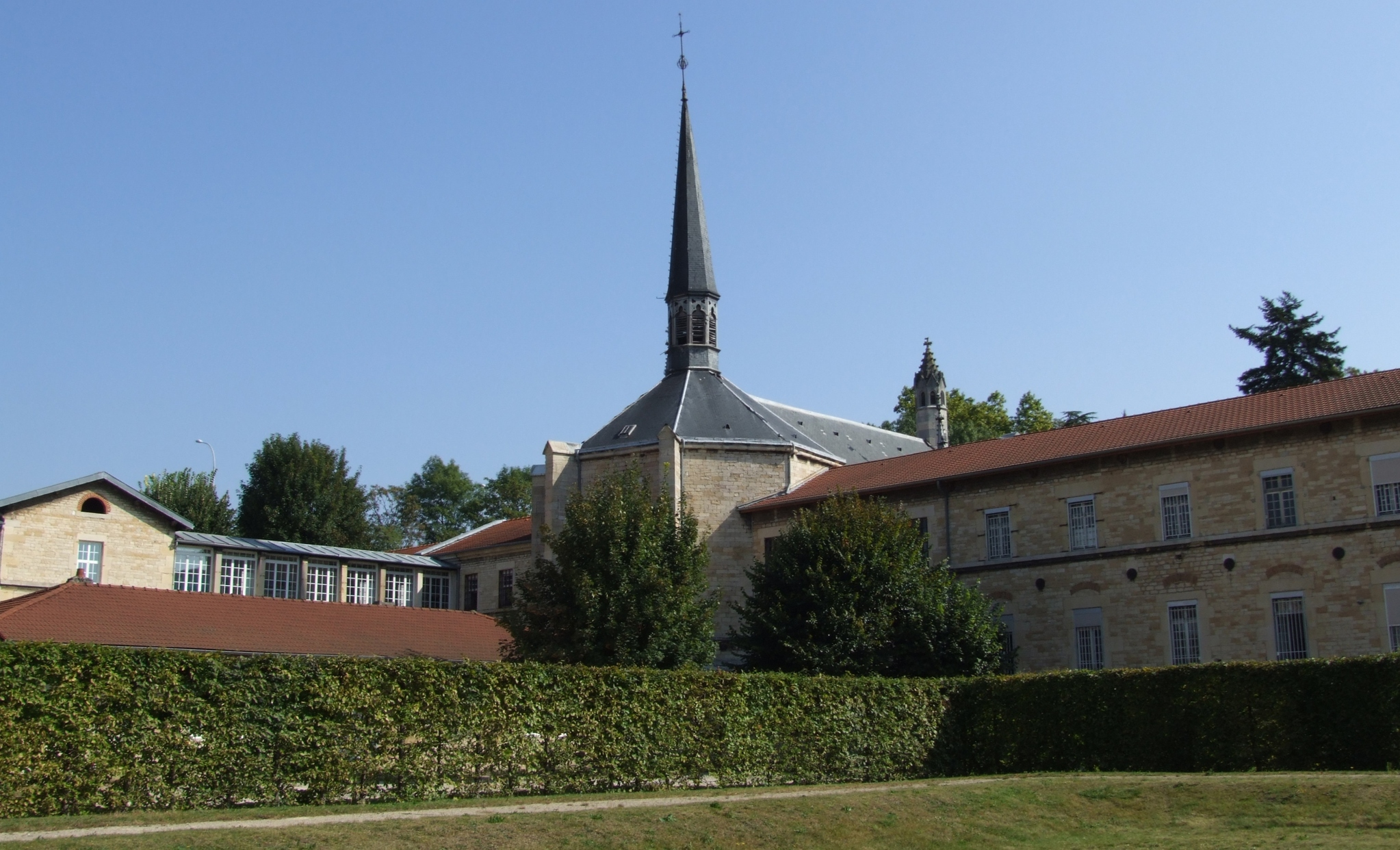
Champmol Charterhouse in Dijon

- La Grande Chartreuse, Saint-Pierre-de-Chartreuse near Grenoble (Isère), mother house of the Carthusian Order (extant since 1084: 1084–1792, 1816–1903, 1940– )
- Abbeville Charterhouse, also Thuison Charterhouse or Val-Saint-Honoré Charterhouse (Chartreuse Saint-Honoré de Thuison-lès-Abbeville, Chartreuse Val-Saint-Honoré), Abbeville (Somme) (1300–1791)
- Aillon Charterhouse, also Mont-Sainte-Marie Charterhouse (Chartreuse Notre-Dame d'Aillon, Chartreuse Mont-Sainte-Marie), in Aillon-le-Jeune, Le Châtelard (Savoie) (1178–1793)
- Aix Charterhouse (Chartreuse Sainte-Marthe d'Aix) in Aix-en-Provence (Bouches-du-Rhône) (1623–1791)
- Apponay Charterhouse (Chartreuse Notre-Dame d'Apponay), Rémilly (Nièvre)(1185–1790)
- Arvière Charterhouse (Chartreuse Notre-Dame d'Arvière), Lochieu (Ain) (1132–1791)
- Auray Charterhouse (Chartreuse Saint-Michel-du-Champ d'Auray), Auray, Brech (Morbihan) (1480–1791; built as a men's collegiate foundation soon after 1364; bought in 1810 by two priests for a school for deaf mutes)
- Basseville Charterhouse (Chartreuse Notre-Dame du Val-Saint-Jean, Basseville) in Pousseaux (Nièvre) (1328–1791)
- Bellary Charterhouse (Chartreuse de l'Annonciation de la Sainte-Vierge), Châteauneuf-Val-de-Bargis, Donzy (Nièvre) (1209–1791)
- Bellevue Charterhouse, Beauvoir Charterhouse or Belvezer Charterhouse, see Saïx
- Bonlieu Charterhouse (Chartreuse Notre-Dame de Bonlieu), Bonlieu, Saint-Laurent-en-Grandvaux (Jura) (1171–1791)
- Bonnefoy Charterhouse (Chartreuse Notre-Dame de Bonnefoy) in Le Béage (Ardèche) (1156–1791)
- Bonpas Charterhouse (Chartreuse Notre-Dame de Bonpas or Bompas), Caumont-sur-Durance (Vaucluse) (1318–1792; previously a house of the Knights Hospitallers from 1281)
- Bordeaux Charterhouse (Chartreuse Notre-Dame de Miséricorde), Bordeaux (Gironde) (1383–1460; 1605–1790)
- Bosserville Charterhouse (Chartreuse de l'Immaculée Conception, Bosserville), Art-sur-Meurthe (Meurthe-et-Moselle) (1666–1792; noviciate house 1835–1901; exiled to Saxon 1901 and moved to Pleterje in 1903)
- Bourbon-lès-Gaillon Charterhouse or Aubevoye Charterhouse (Chartreuse de Bourbon-lès-Gaillon, Chartreuse d'Aubevoye, Chartreuse Notre-Dame de Bonne-Espérance), Aubevoye near Gaillon (Eure) (1572–1791)
- Bourgfontaine Charterhouse (Chartreuse Fontaine-Notre-Dame de Bourgfontaine), Pisseleux, Villers-Cotterêts (Aisne) (1325–1792)
- La Boutillerie Charterhouse (Chartreuse de la Boutillerie, Chartreuse Notre-Dame-des-Sept-Douleurs), Fleurbaix (Pas-de-Calais) (1618–1792)
- Bouvante Charterhouse (Chartreuse de Bouvante, Chartreuse du Val-Sainte-Marie), Bouvante (Drôme) (1144–1791)
- Bugey, see Saint-Sulpice
- Cahors Charterhouse (Chartreuse Notre-Dame-du-Temple de Cahors), Cahors (Lot) (1328–1791)
- Carcassonne, see La Loubatiere
- Chalais Charterhouse (Chartreuse Notre-Dame de Chalais), Voreppe (Isère) (Benedictines 1170–1303, Carthusians 1308–1791, Dominicans 1844–1901, Dominican Sisters from 1961)
- Champmol Charterhouse (Chartreuse de la Sainte-Trinité de Champmol), Dijon (Côte-d'Or) (1383–1791)
- La Correrie, see La Grande Chartreuse
- Currières Charterhouse (Chartreuse Notre-Dame de Currières), Saint-Pierre-de-Chartreuse (Isère) (1296–1791; acted as the infirmary for the nearby Grande Chartreuse)
- Douai Charterhouse (Chartreuse Saints-Joseph-et-Morand), Douai (Nord) (1654–1791)
- Durbon Charterhouse (Chartreuse Notre Dame de Durbon), Saint-Julien-en-Beauchêne (Hautes-Alpes) (monks 1116–1791; nuns, originally from Bertaud, occupied the dependencies 1446–1601)
- Les Écouges Charterhouse (Chartreuse Notre-Dame-des-Surveillants des Écouges), Saint-Gervais, Vinay (Isère) (1116–1422)
- Fontenay Charterhouse (Chartreuse Notre-Dame de Fontenay), Beaune (Côte-d'Or) (1328–1791)
- Fourvoirie in Saint-Laurent-du-Pont, the order's distillery of chartreuse: built 1860; moved to Tarragona 1903, returned 1933; destroyed by a landslide in 1935, and re-established at Voiron, where it remains)
- Le Glandier Charterhouse (Chartreuse Notre-Dame du Glandier), Beyssac (Corrèze) (1219–1791; 1869–1901)
- Gosnay, see Val-Saint-Esprit
- Isles Charterhouse (Chartreuse d'Isles), near Troyes (possibly Isle Aumont) (1325–1428; moved to Troyes (La Prée))
- Koenigshoffen Charterhouse (Chartreuse Mont-Sainte-Marie de Koenigshoffen), Koenigshoffen, a district of Strasbourg (Bas-Rhin) (1355–1591; destroyed by Protestants; the community settled at Molsheim)
- Largentière Charterhouse (Chartreuse Notre Dame de la Pré or de la Prée), Troyes (Aube) (1325–1428 in Troyes (Isles or Isle Aumont), 1428–1620 in Troyes (La Prée), 1620–1792 in Troyes (Largentière))
- Le Liget Charterhouse (Chartreuse du Liget, Chartreuse Notre-Dame et Saint-Jean-Baptiste du Liget), Chemillé-sur-Indrois (Indre-et-Loire) (1178–1791)
- La Loubatière Charterhouse (Chartreuse de la Loubatière, Chartreuse Notre-Dame de Beaulieu), Lacombe (Aude) (1320–1427)
- Lugny Charterhouse (Chartreuse Notre-Dame de Lugny), Leuglay (Côte-d’Or) (1170–1791)
- Lyon Charterhouse (Chartreuse Notre-Dame-du-Lys-du-Saint-Esprit de Lyon), Lyon (Rhône) (1584–1791; between 1810 and 1901 the buildings accommodated the diocesan missionary society, known as the Société des Chartreux de Lyon)
- Macourt, see Valenciennes
- Maillard Charterhouse (Chartreuse Notre-Dame de Maillard), Amillis (Seine-et-Marne) (1504–1509)
- Marienfloss Charterhouse (Chartreuse de Marienfloss), Marienfloss near Sierck (Moselle) (1415–1431)
- Marly, see Valenciennes
- Marseille Charterhouse (Chartreuse Sainte-Marie-Madeleine de Marseille), Marseille (Bouches-du-Rhône) (1633–1791)
- Meyriat Charterhouse (Chartreuse de Meyriat), Vieu-d'Izenave (Ain) (1116–1792)
- Molsheim Charterhouse (Chartreuse Notre-Dame de Molsheim), Molsheim (Bas-Rhin) (1600–1792; settled by the displaced community of Koenigshoffen); now a museum, the Musée de la Chartreuse
- Mont-Dieu Charterhouse (Chartreuse Notre-Dame du Mont-Dieu), Le Mont-Dieu, Raucourt (Ardennes) (1134–1791)
- Montmerle Charterhouse (Chartreuse Montmerle, Chartreuse Notre-Dame-du-Val-Saint-Étienne), formerly Montmerle Priory, Lescheroux (Ain) (Benedictines from 1070; Carthusians 1210–1792)
- Montrieux Charterhouse (Chartreuse Notre-Dame de Montrieux), Méounes-lès-Montrieux (Var) (extant) (1117–1790, 1861–1901, and 1929– )
- Mont-Sainte-Marie, see Aillon
- Mortemart Charterhouse (Chartreuse de Mortemart), Mortemart, Mézières-sur-Issoire (Haute-Vienne) (1335–1413; thereafter Augustinians)
- Mougères Charterhouse (Chartreuse Notre-Dame-de-Pitié de Mougères), Caux (Hérault) (1825–1901, 1936–1977; thereafter Dominicans)
- Moulins Charterhouse (Chartreuse Saint-Joseph de Moulins) in Moulins (Allier) (1623–1790)
- Nancy Charterhouse (Chartreuse Sainte-Anne de Nancy), Laxou, Nancy (Meurthe-et-Moselle) (1632–1666; transferred to Bosserville)
- Nantes Charterhouse (Chartreuse Saints-Donatien-et-Rogatien de Nantes) in Nantes (Loire-Atlantique) (1446–1791)
- Neuville Charterhouse (Chartreuse de Neuville, Chartreuse Notre-Dame-des-Prés), Neuville-sous-Montreuil, Montreuil-sur-Mer (Pas-de-Calais) (1323–1791; 1870–1901, when exiled to Parkminster; buildings now occupied by the Famille monastique de Bethléem)
- Noyon Charterhouse (Chartreuse Mont-Saint-Louis, Chartreuse Notre-Dame de Mont-Renaud), Passel, Noyon (Oise) (1308–1791)
- Oiron Charterhouse otherwise Oyron Charterhouse (Chartreuse d'Oyron or d'Oiron), Oiron (Deux-Sèvres) (1396–1446)
- Orléans Charterhouse (Chartreuse Saint-Lazare), Orléans (Loiret) (1622–1790)
- Le Parc Charterhouse (Chartreuse du Parc en Charnie or Chartreuse Sainte-Marie d'Orques), Saint-Denis-d'Orques (Sarthe) (1236–1791)
- Paris, see Vauvert
- Passel, see Noyon
- Le Petit-Quevilly, Rouen (Seine-Maritime):
  - Chartreuse Notre Dame de la Rose (1384–1682; transferred to St. Julien)
  - Chartreuse Saint Julien (1667–1791; leper hospital from before 1183; Benedictine monks from 1600; Carthusians from 1667)
- Pierre-Châtel Charterhouse (Chartreuse Notre-Dame de Pierre-Châtel), Virignin (Ain) (1384–1791)
- Le Pin, see La Sylve-Bénite
- Pomier Charterhouse (Chartreuse de Pomier), Pomier, Présilly (Haute-Savoie) (1170–1793)
- Port-Sainte-Marie Charterhouse (Chartreuse du Port-Sainte-Marie), Chapdes-Beaufort, Pontgibaud (Puy-de-Dôme) (1219–1792)
- Portes Charterhouse (Chartreuse Notre-Dame de Portes), Bénonces (Ain) (extant; 1115–1791; 1855–1901 (exiled to Saxon); 1971–today)
- La Prée (Chartreuse Notre-Dame de la Prée), Troyes (1325–1428 in Isles, 1428–1620 in Troyes (La Prée), 1620–1792 in Troyes (Largentière))
- Le Puy Charterhouse (Chartreuse Notre-Dame de Charensac), Brives-Charensac, Le Puy-en-Velay (Haute-Loire) (1628–1791)
- Le Reposoir Charterhouse (Chartreuse Notre-Dame du Reposoir), Le Reposoir (Haute-Savoie) (1151–1793, 1846–1855, 1860–1901; exiled to Loèche; Carmelites since 1932)
- Rettel Charterhouse (Chartreuse Saint-Sixte de Rettel), Rettel, Sierck (Moselle) (1431–1792)
- Ripaille Charterhouse (Chartreuse Saints-Maurice-et-Lazare et Annonciade de Ripaille), Thonon-les-Bains (Haute-Savoie) (1624–1793)
- Rodez Charterhouse (Chartreuse Notre-Dame d’Aveyron), Rodez, Aveyron (1511–1791)
- Romans Charterhouse (Chartreuse de Romans), Romans (Drôme) (1791–1813; the monks of Val-Sainte-Marie, Bouvantes, took refuge here during the Revolution)
- Saint-Hugon, see Val-Saint-Hugon
- Saint-Sulpice Charterhouse (Chartreuse Saint-Sulpice en Bugey), Thézillieu (Ain) (1120–1130; opted to become Cistercian, and settled from Pontigny)
- Sainte-Croix-en-Jarez Charterhouse (Chartreuse Sainte-Croix-en-Jarez), Sainte-Croix-en-Jarez (Loire) (1280–1792)
- Saïx Charterhouse, otherwise Bellevue Charterhouse, Beauvoir Charterhouse or Belvezer Charterhouse (Chartreuse de Saïx, Chartreuse Notre-Dame-de-Bellevue de Saïx), Saïx, Castres (Tarn) (1361–1567; 1647–1791)
- Seillon Charterhouse (Chartreuse de Seillon), Péronnas (Ain) (Carthusians to 1169; Franciscans 1178–1792)
- Sélignac Charterhouse (Chartreuse de Sélignac or Chartreuse du Val-Saint-Martin de Sélignac), Simandre-sur-Suran (Ain) (1202–1792; 1869–1901, when exiled to Saxon; 1929–2001; continues to operate as a lay house, Maison St Bruno, within the Order)
- La Sylve-Bénite Charterhouse (Chartreuse de la Sylve-Bénite), Le Pin, Virieu (Isère) (1116–1792)
- Thuison, see Abbeville
- Toulouse Charterhouse (Chartreuse Notre-Dame de Toulouse), Toulouse (Haute-Garonne) (1569–1791; today a parish church)
- Troyes, see Isles, La Prée and Largentière
- Val-Saint-Esprit Charterhouse (Chartreuse du Val-Saint-Esprit), Gosnay, Béthune (Pas-de-Calais) (1329–1791) (double monastery with Mont-Sainte-Marie in Gosnay)
- Val-Saint-Georges Charterhouse (Chartreuse du Val-Saint-Georges, Chartreuse Sainte-Marie du Val-Saint-Georges), Pouques-Lormes (Nièvre) (1234–1792)
- Val-Saint-Honoré, see Abbeville
- Val-Saint-Hugon Charterhouse, also Saint-Hugon Charterhouse (Chartreuse du Val-Saint-Hugon, Chartreuse de Saint-Hugon), Arvillard, La Rochette (Savoie) (1172–1793; today a Buddhist centre)
- Val-Saint-Martin, see Sélignac
- Val-Saint-Pierre Charterhouse (Chartreuse du Val-Saint-Pierre), Braye-en-Thiérache (Aisne) (1140–1791)
- Val-Sainte-Aldegonde Charterhouse (Chartreuse du Val-Sainte-Aldegonde, Chartreuse du Val de Sainte-Aldegonde), Longuenesse (Pas-de-Calais) (1298–1791)
- Chartreuse du Val-de-Bénédiction in Villeneuve-lès-Avignon (Gard) (1356–1792)
- Val-Dieu Charterhouse (Chartreuse du Val-Dieu), Feings (Orne) (1170–1791)
- Valbonne Charterhouse (Chartreuse de Valbonne) in Saint-Paulet-de-Caisson (Gard) (1203-1792; Protestant 1836–1901)
- Valenciennes Charterhouse (Chartreuse Notre-Dame de Valenciennes), Valenciennes (Nord) (1288 in Val St. Paul; moved to Valenciennes 1293; moved to Macourt-lez-Marly ?–1794)
- Vallon Charterhouse (Chartreuse de Vallon), Bellevaux (Haute-Savoie) (1138-1628; moved to Ripaille)
- Valprofonde Charterhouse (Chartreuse Valprofonde), Béon (Yonne) (1301–1791)
- Vauclaire Charterhouse (Chartreuse de Vauclaire), Montignac, Montpon-Ménestérol (Dordogne) (1328–1790, 1858–1901)
- Vaucluse Charterhouse (Chartreuse Notre-Dame de Vaucluse), Onoz (Jura) (1125 or 1139 -1791)
- Vauvert Charterhouse (Chartreuse de Vauvert) in Paris (founded 1257 in Gentilly; moved 1258 to the site of the abandoned Château de Vauvert, adjacent to the site of the present Jardin du Luxembourg; dissolved 1792)
- La Verne Charterhouse (Chartreuse de la Verne), Collobrières (Var) (1170–1791; from 1983 Congregation of Bethlehem)
- Villefranche Charterhouse (Chartreuse Saint-Sauveur de Villefranche), Villefranche-de-Rouergue (Aveyron) (1450–1791)
- Voiron (distillery), see Fourvoirie

=== Germany ===
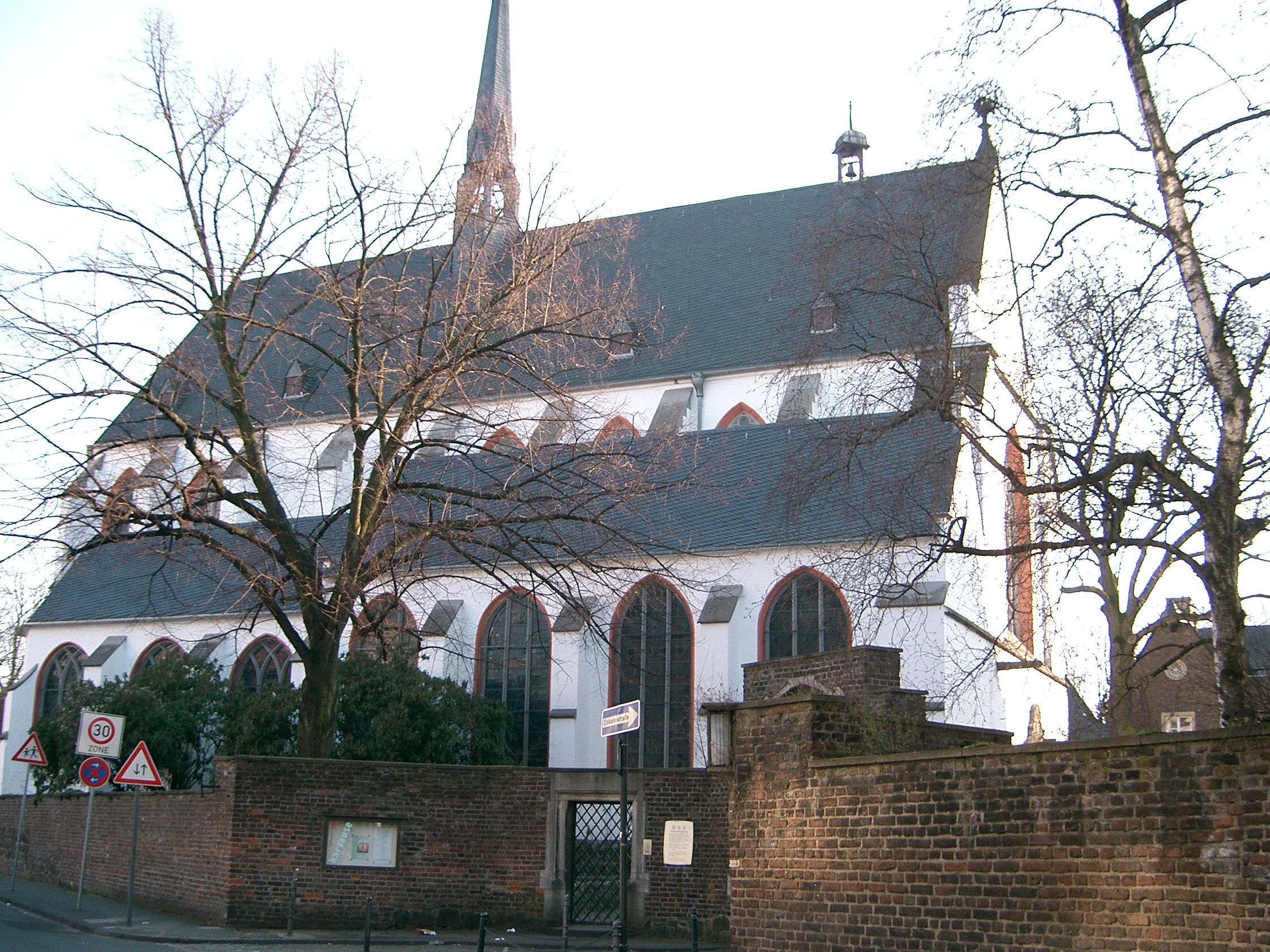
Former Carthusian church in Cologne, now St. Barbara's Church

- Ahrensbök Charterhouse (Kartause Marientempel or Templum Beatae Mariae), Ahrensbök near Lübeck (Schleswig-Holstein) (1397–1564)
- Astheim Charterhouse (Kartause Marienbrück), Astheim near Volkach (Bavaria) (1408–1803)
- Buxheim Charterhouse (Kartause Maria Saal), Buxheim (Bavaria) (1402–1803; the only Imperial charterhouse [Reichskartause]; previously a men's collegiate foundation, 1100–1402; from 1926, Salesians)
- Christgarten Charterhouse (Kartause Christgarten), Ederheim near Nördlingen (Bavaria) (1384–1552; 1631–1648)
- Cologne Charterhouse (Kartause Sankt Barbara), Cologne (North Rhine-Westphalia) (1334–1794; the church is now St. Barbara's Evangelical parish church)
- Eisenach Charterhouse (Kartause Sankt Elisabeth von Krimmelbach), Eisenach (Thuringia) (1378–1525; now Kartausgarten)
- Engelgarten Charterhouse, also known as Würzburg Charterhouse (Kartause Engelgarten), Würzburg (Bavaria) (1348/52–1803)
- Eppenberg Charterhouse, also known as Vogelsberg Charterhouse (Kartause Sancti Johannis Baptistae), Gensungen in Felsberg (Hesse) (1440–1532/1586; previously Premonstratensian canonesses, c. 1217–1438)
- Erfurt Charterhouse (Kartause Sankt Salvatorberg), Erfurt (Thuringia) (1371–1802)
- Flüren, see Wesel
- Frankfurt Charterhouse (Kartause Barmherzigkeit Gottes), Frankfurt an der Oder (Brandenburg) (1396–1568)
- Freiburg Charterhouse (Kartause Sankt Johannisberg), Freiburg im Breisgau (Baden-Württemberg) (1346–1782)
- Grünau Charterhouse (Kartause Neuzelle), Schollbrunn near Hasloch (Bavaria) (c. 1328–1557, 1629–1802)
- Güterstein Charterhouse (Kartause Güterstein), Güterstein near Bad Urach (Baden-Württemberg) (1439–1535; previously a Cistercian priory and a Benedictine priory)
- Hildesheim Charterhouse (Kartause Marienkloster), Hildesheim (Lower Saxony) (1387–1777)
- Ilmbach Charterhouse (Kartause Mariengarten), Prichsenstadt (Bavaria) (1453–1803)
- Kiedrich, see Mainz
- Koblenz Charterhouse (Kartause Sankt Beatusberg), Koblenz (Rhineland-Palatinate) (1331–1802)
- Konradsburg Charterhouse (Kartause Mariæ Verkündigung), Konradsburg near Ermsleben (Saxony-Anhalt) (1477–1525; previously Benedictine monks)
- Konz Charterhouse (Kartause Sankt Bruno), Karthaus, Konz, formerly known as Merzlich (Rhineland-Palatinate) (1680–1802; settled by the displaced community of St. Alban's Charterhouse, Trier)
- Mainz Charterhouse (Kartause Peterstal, later Kartause Michelsberg), on the Sankt-Michaelsberg, Mainz (Rhineland-Palatinate) (founded 1308 in the Tal Neuhaus or Peterstal in Kiedrich; moved to Mainz 1324; dissolved 1781)
- Maria Hain Charterhouse (Kartause Maria Hain), Unterrath near Düsseldorf (North Rhine-Westphalia) (founded 1869; moved to Bad Wurzach in 1964 as Marienau Charterhouse)
- Marienau Charterhouse near Bad Wurzach (Baden-Württemberg) (extant since 1964, when the community from Hain settled here)
- Marienburg Charterhouse (Kartause Marienburg), Weddern in the parish of Dülmen (North Rhine-Westphalia) (1476–1802)
- Marienehe Charterhouse (Kartause Marienehe, Kartause Himmelszinnen), Rostock (Mecklenburg-Vorpommern) (1396–1552)
- Marienkron Charterhouse (Kartause Marienkron) near Rügenwalde (founded 1394 in Körlin; from 1407 in Rügenwalde; dissolved 1534)
- Martinstal Charterhouse (Kartause Jesu Christi Verklärung am Martinstal), Crimmitschau near Neukirchen, Zwickau (Saxony) (1478–1527; formerly a canonry, ruined by the Hussites in 1430)
- Nördlingen, see Christgarten
- Nuremberg Charterhouse (Kartause Marienzell), Nuremberg (Bavaria) (1380–1525; today part of the Germanisches Nationalmuseum)
- Peterstal, see Mainz
- Prüll Charterhouse (Kartause Sankt Veit), Prüll in Regensburg (Bavaria) (1483–1803)
- Regensburg, see Prüll
- Rostock, see Marienehe
- Trier Charterhouse (Kartause Sankt Alban), Trier (Rhineland-Palatinate) (1331–1674; moved to Merzlich, now known as Konz-Karthaus)
- Tückelhausen Charterhouse (Kartause Heilszelle), Ochsenfurt (Bavaria) (1351–1803)
- Vogelberg or Vogelsberg, see Eppenberg
- Vogelsang Charterhouse (Kartause Mariae Mitleiden), near Jülich (North Rhine-Westphalia) (1478–1802)
- Wesel Charterhouse (Kartause Insula Reginae Coeli), Gravinsel in Flüren, between Wesel and Büderich, Düsseldorf (North Rhine-Westphalia) (1417–1590; the community eventually settled a new charterhouse in Xanten, in 1623)
- Würzburg, see Engelgarten
- Xanten Charterhouse (Kartause Insula Reginae Coeli), Xanten (North Rhine-Westphalia) (settled by displaced community from Wesel 1623; dissolved 1802)

=== Hungary ===
- Ercsi Charterhouse, at Ercsi, island of Csepel (1238–1253; formerly a Benedictine abbey, founded end of the 12th century; buildings given to Cistercians 1253)
- Lővőld Charterhouse (St. Michael's Valley), at Varoslőd, near Lake Balaton (1347–1552)
- Tárkány or Felsőtárkány Charterhouse, at Felsőtárkány near Eger (1330–1543)

=== Ireland ===
- Kinalehin Charterhouse, also Kinaleghin Charterhouse ("House of God"), near Abbey, in the parish of Duniry (Co. Galway), diocese of Clonfert ([1249 x 1256]–1341; house surrendered to the bishop of Clonfert and granted in 1371 to the Friars Minor or Franciscans, and from then on known as Kinalehin Friary

=== Italy ===
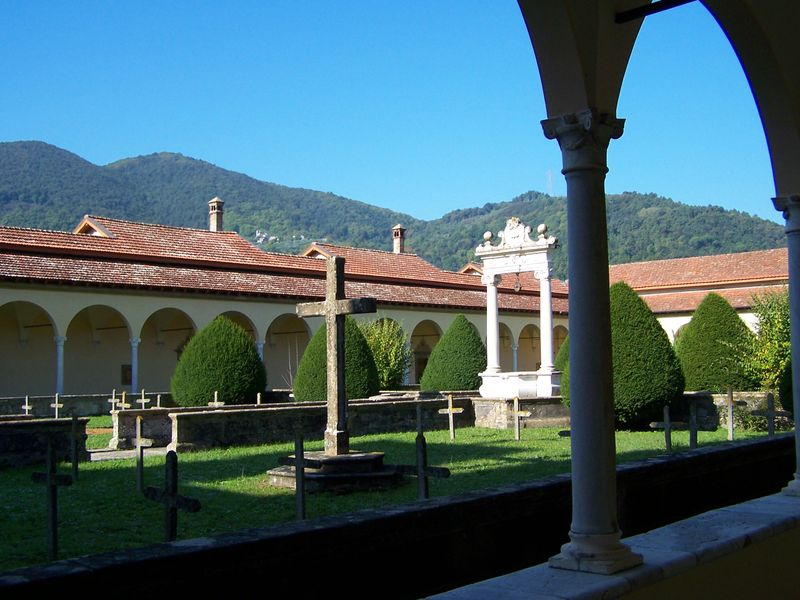
Farneta Charterhouse

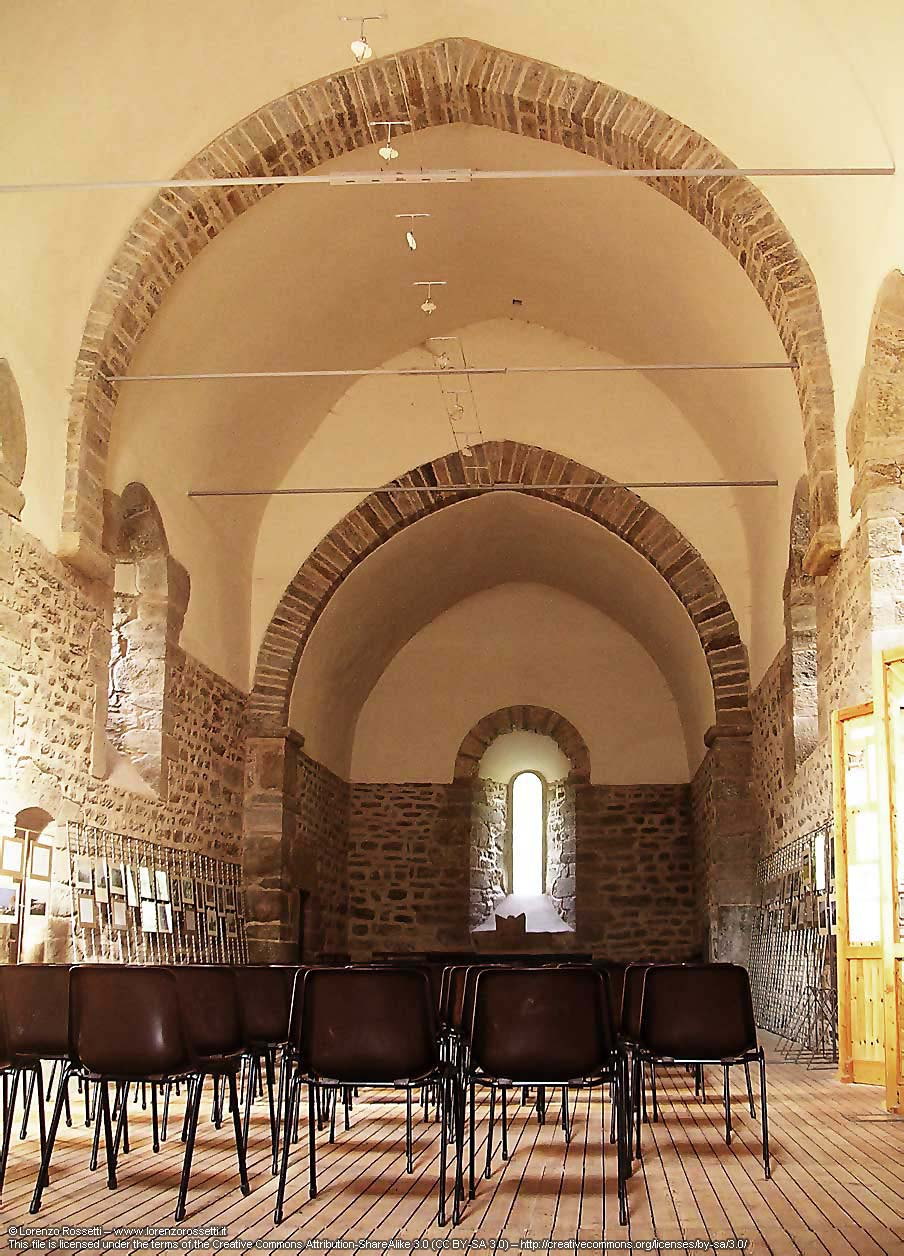
Montebenedetto Charterhouse

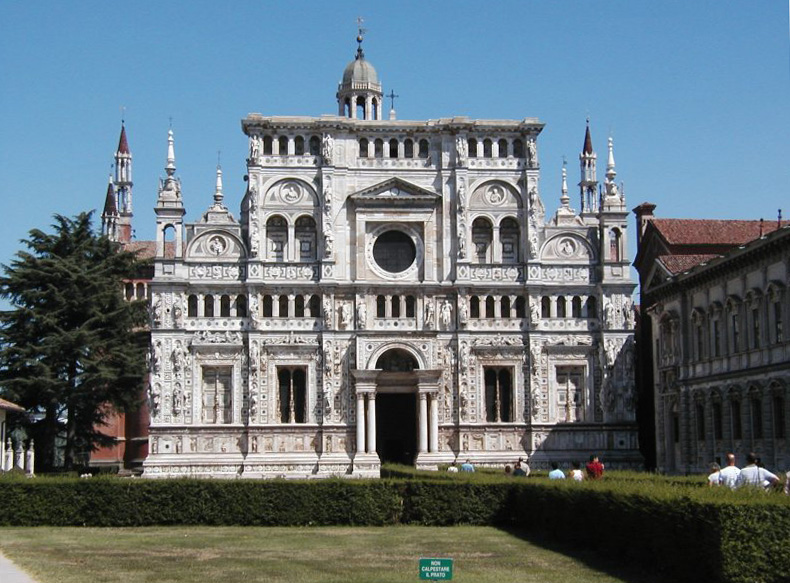
Pavia Charterhouse

- Albenga Charterhouse or Toirano Charterhouse (Certosa di San Pietro dei Monti di Toirano or Certosa di Monte San Pietro), Albenga (Savona) (1315–1799; previously a Benedictine monastery, San Pietro dei Monti, united in 1315 to Casotto Charterhouse; became autonomous c.1320; transferred to buildings further down the same valley in 1495)
- Allerengelberg, see Schnals
- Asti Charterhouse (Certosa d'Asti), Asti (1387–1801; previously a Vallombrosan monastery)
- Avigliana Charterhouse (Certosa della Santa Trinità di Avigliana), Avigliana (1598–1630; originally a house of the Humiliati; given to the Carthusians of Banda in 1595, whose community moved here in 1598; requisitioned and destroyed for military purposes in 1630, and the community transferred temporarily to Montebenedetto; given Collegno Charterhouse as a replacement for Avigliana in 1642)
- Banda Charterhouse (Certosa di Banda), Villar Focchiardo (Val di Susa (Piedmont) (1498–1598; settled by the displaced community from Montebenedetto Charterhouse; moved to Avigliana)
- Belriguardo Charterhouse (Certosa della Purificazione di Maria), Siena (1345–1636)
- Bologna Charterhouse (Certosa di San Girolamo di Bologna), Bologna (1334–1804)
- Calci, see Pisa
- Capri Charterhouse (Certosa di San Giacomo), Capri (1370–1808)
- Casotto Charterhouse (Certosa di Santa Maria di Casotto), Garessio (Asti) (1170 or 1183–1802)
- Catania Charterhouse (Certosa Dominae Nostrae Novae Lucis), Catania, Sicily (1360–1381)
- Cervara Abbey or La Cervara (Abbazia della Cervara, Abbazia di San Girolamo al Monte di Portofino), Santa Margherita Ligure (1901–1936; a former Benedictine abbey converted to a college of the Somaschi Fathers, the Collegio di San Girolamo, used as a house of refuge for the exiled French communities from Montrieux and Mougères)
- Chiaramonte Charterhouse (Certosa di Chiaramonte, Certosa della Valle di San Nicolò), Chiaramonte (1392–1808)
- Collegno Charterhouse (Certosa dell'Annunciazione di Collegno), Collegno, Turin (1642–1855; settled by the displaced community of Avigliana from temporary accommodation at Montebenedetto; after 1855, the community remained together at La Safforona, until dispersed in 1863)
- Farneta Charterhouse (Certosa di Farneta), Lucca (extant since 1338)
- Ferrara Charterhouse (Certosa San Cristoforo), Ferrara (1452–1801)
- Florence Charterhouse (Certosa di Firenze or Certosa San Lorenzo del Galluzzo), Galluzzo near Florence (founded 1345, dissolved as a charterhouse in the 1960s; from the 1960s onwards occupied by Cistercian monks)
- Galluzzo, see Florence
- Garegnano Charterhouse (Certosa di Garegnano), Milan (1349–1779)
- Genoa Charterhouse (Certosa di San Bartolommeo di Genova), Rivarolo Ligure, Genoa (1297–1798)
- Gorgona Charterhouse (Certosa di Santa Maria e San Gorgonio di Gorgona), island of Gorgona (Livorno) (1373–1425; abandoned in 1425, and community united with that of Pisa; sold in 1776)
- Guglionesi Charterhouse (Certosa di San Giovanni Battista e della Porta del Paradiso di Guglionesi, or Charterhouse of St. John the Baptist and the Gate of Paradise), Guglionesi near Termoli (Campobasso) (1338–1420; united to Naples)
- Losa Charterhouse (Certosa della Losa), Losa in Gravere, Susa Valley, Piedmont (1189–1197; community moved to Montebenedetto Charterhouse)
- Maggiano Charterhouse (Certosa di Maggiano), Siena (1314–1785)
- Mantua Charterhouse (Certosa della Santa Trinità di Mantova), Mantua (1408–1782)
- Milan, see Garegnano
- Mombracco Charterhouse (Certosa di Mombracco, also Monbracco, Montebracco or Monte Bracco) (1282–1303, established as a men's house under the short-lived women's charterhouse at Belmonte di Busca; 1325–1642 as an independent monastery until ruined by war and plague; its assets were given to Collegno. In 1794 the premises were given to the Trappists and, although the community did not stay long, became known also as the Convento di Trappa)
- Monte Oliveto, Pinerolo (Turin) (1903–1904; Olivetan monastery; house of refuge for the exiled French community of La Grande Chartreuse, previously at Rosière; moved on to Farneta)
- Monte San Pietro, see Albenga
- Montello Charterhouse (Certosa di Santa Maria e San Girolamo di Montello), Montebelluna (Treviso) (1349–1810)
- Montebenedetto Charterhouse (Certosa di Montebenedetto), Villar Focchiardo, Susa Valley, Piedmont (1197–1498, settled by the displaced community from Losa, and moved to Banda Charterhouse; 1630–1642, settled by the displaced community from Avigliana until the completion of the new monastery at Collegno)
- Naples Charterhouse (Certosa di San Martino), in the Castel Sant'Elmo in Naples (1325–1800; 1836–1921)
- Padua Charterhouse (Certosa dei Santi Girolamo e Bernardo di Padova), Padua 1448–1534; moved to Vigodarzere (1534–1768)
- Padula Charterhouse (Certosa di San Lorenzo di Padula), Marsico Nuovo (Salerno) (1306–1807; 1819–1866)
- Paradigna, see Parma
- Parma Charterhouse (Certosa di Parma, Certosa di Paradigna or Certosa di Maria della Schola Dei), Parma (1285–1769)
- Pavia Charterhouse (Certosa di Santa Maria delle Grazie di Pavia), Pavia (1396–1782; 1843–1881; 1931–1947)
- Pesio Charterhouse (Certosa di Pesio), Chiusa di Pesio, Piedmont (1173–1802)
- Pinerolo Charterhouse (Certosa di Santa Brigitta di Pinerolo), Pinerolo (Turin) (1418–19; project abandoned on death of the founder)
- Pisa Charterhouse or Calci Charterhouse (Certosa di Pisa, also Certosa di Calci), Val Graziosa, Pisa (1367–1808, 1814–1969)
- Pontignano Charterhouse (Certosa di Pontignano or di San Pietro), Castelnuovo Berardenga, near Siena (1343–1785)
- Rivarolo, see Genoa
- Rome:
  - Certosa della Santa Croce di Gerusalemme or Santa Croce in Urbe (1363–1561; moved to Santa Marìa dei Angeli)
  - Certosa di Santa Maria degli Angeli (1561–1884)
- La Safforona, see Collegno
- Savona Charterhouse (Certosa di Santa Maria di Loreto di Savona), Savona (1492–1801)
- Schnals Charterhouse (Kartause Allerengelberg), Schnals in South Tyrol (1325–1782)
- Serra San Bruno Charterhouse (Certosa Serra San Bruno), formerly San Stefano del Bosco, Serra San Bruno (Catanzaro) (1090–1197; 1197–1514, Cistercians; 1514–1808; resettled in 1856, still extant)
- Toirano, see Albenga
- Trisulti Charterhouse (Certosa di Trisulti), Collepardo near Frosinone (1204–1946)
- Turin, see Collegno
- Val Graziosa, see Pisa
- Vedana Charterhouse (Certosa di San Marco di Vedana), Mas di Sedico, later Sedico itself (Belluno) (1456–1768, community of Carthusian monks, established in a former hospice and suppressed in 1768 by the Republic of Venice; re-established as a community of monks 1882–1977; 1977–1994, nuns from San Francesco; 1998–, nuns from Riva: see below under women's foundations)
- Venice Charterhouse (Certosa di Sant'Andrea del Lido di Venezia), Venice (1422–1810)
- Vigodarzere, see Padua

=== Netherlands ===
- Amsterdam Charterhouse (Kartuize Sint-Andries-ter-Zaliger-Haven), Amsterdam (c. 1392/93–1579)
- Bethlehem Charterhouse, see Roermond
- Cadzand Charterhouse (Kartuize Cadzand), island of Cadzand, Oostburg: charterhouse proposed by charter of King Edward III of England in 1364, but not proceeded with
- Delft Charterhouse (Kartuize Sint-Bartolomaeusdal in Jerusalem), Delft (1470–1572)
- Geertruidenberg Charterhouse (Het Hollandse Huis), Raamsdonk near Geertruidenberg (1336–1573)
- Hertogenbosch Charterhouse, see Vught
- Holland Charterhouse, see Tubbergen
- Hollandse Huis, see Geertruidenberg
- Kampen Charterhouse or Sonnenberg Charterhouse (Kartuize Sint-Maarten op de Sonnenberg), Oosterholt in IJsselmuiden, Kampen (1485–1581)
- Monnikhuizen Charterhouse (Kartuize Beatae Mariae), Arnhem (c. 1335/42–c. 1585)
- Noordgouwe, see Zierikzee
- Roermond Charterhouse (Kartuize Onze-Lieve-Vrouwe van Bethlehem or Bethlehem Mariae), Roermond (1376–1783)
- Tubbergen Charterhouse or Holland Charterhouse (Kartuize Sint-Joseph van Holland), Tubbergen, Overijssel (1951–61)
- Utrecht Charterhouse (Kartuize Nieuwlicht or Nova Lux; also Kartuize Sint Salvator), in Bloemendaal, Utrecht (1391–1583)
- Vught Charterhouse or s'Hertogenbosch Charterhouse (Kartuize Sint-Sophie te Constantinopel), Vught near 's-Hertogenbosch (1466–1640)
- Zierikzee Charterhouse or Mount Zion Charterhouse (Kartuize Sionsberg) at Noordgouwe in Schouwen-Duiveland (1433/34–1578)

=== Poland ===
- Gidle Charterhouse, near Częstochowa (1641–1819)
- Grabow Charterhouse, near Szczecin (1360–1538)
- Kartuzy Charterhouse (also known as Karthaus Charterhouse and Marienparadies Charterhouse) in Kartuzy, west of Gdańsk (1380–1826)
- Kraków Charterhouse, Kraków: arrangements for this foundation were made in 1479 but the project was abandoned
- Liegnitz Charterhouse, Legnica (Liegnitz) in Lower Silesia (1423–1548)
- Połaniec Charterhouse, Połaniec: proposed 1425 but not proceeded with
- Przemyśl Charterhouse, Przemyśl: proposed 1602 but not proceeded with
- Schivelbein Charterhouse, Świdwin (Schivelbein) in Pomerania: founded in the 1440s; apparently not suppressed until in or after 1552, that is to say, after the Protestant Reformation in Pomerania

=== Portugal ===
- Cartuxa Santa María de Scala Coeli (Escada do Céu) in Évora (1587–2019, when the last four monks moved to Spanish monasteries; the buildings have since been occupied by the women's order of the Servants of the Lord and the Virgin of Matará)
- Lisbon Charterhouse or Laveiras Charterhouse (Cartuxa Santa María de Valle Misericordiae), Laveiras, Caxias, Lisbon (1594–1833; moved from Lisbon to Laveiras in 1598)

=== Romania ===
- Oradea Charterhouse (St. Stephen's Charterhouse), at Oradea (also known as Grosswardein and Nagyvárad) (1494–1498; formerly a Premonstratensian canonry; royal foundation suppressed by the local bishop for the sake of its assets)

=== Slovakia ===
- Lechnica Charterhouse, also Červený Kláštor ("Red Monastery"), at Lechnica (Carthusians 1320–1563; Camaldolese 1711–1782)
- Haynburg (Brezovička, formerly Hamburg or Haynburg), grange of Lapis Refugii (Letanovce) (1307-1329)
- Letanovce Charterhouse, otherwise Lethenkow Charterhouse (also known as Kláštorisko or Lapis Refugii) at Letanovce, otherwise Lethenkow (1299–1543)

=== Slovenia ===
- Freudental Charterhouse (Kartuzijanski samostan Bistra) in Bistra, formerly Freudental, near Vrhnika (1255–1782)
- Geirach Charterhouse (Kartuzijanski samostan Jurklošter) at Jurklošter, formerly Geirach (1169–1189; 1209–1591)
- Pleterje Charterhouse (Kartuzijanski samostan Pleterje; formerly Plettriach Charterhouse) at Drča near Šentjernej (1403–1593; re-founded 1889; extant)
- Seiz Charterhouse (Kartuzijanski samostan Žiče) at Žiče, formerly Seiz (founded 1155–1165; dissolved 1782)

=== Spain ===
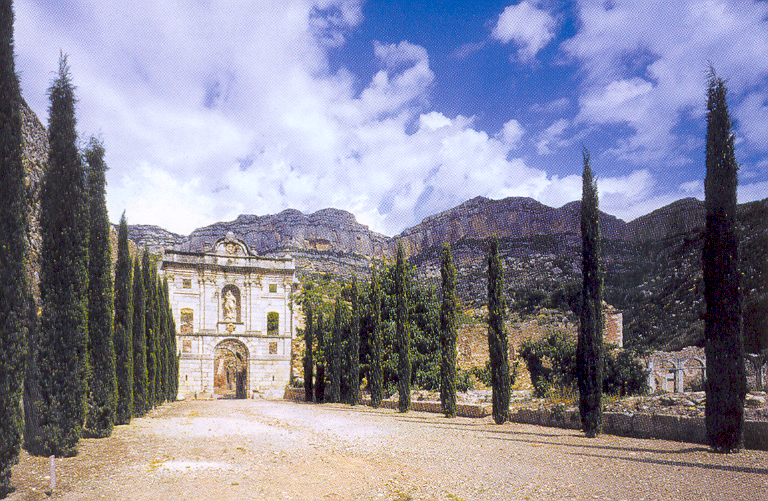
Ruins of the Scala Dei Charterhouse, La Morera del Montsant

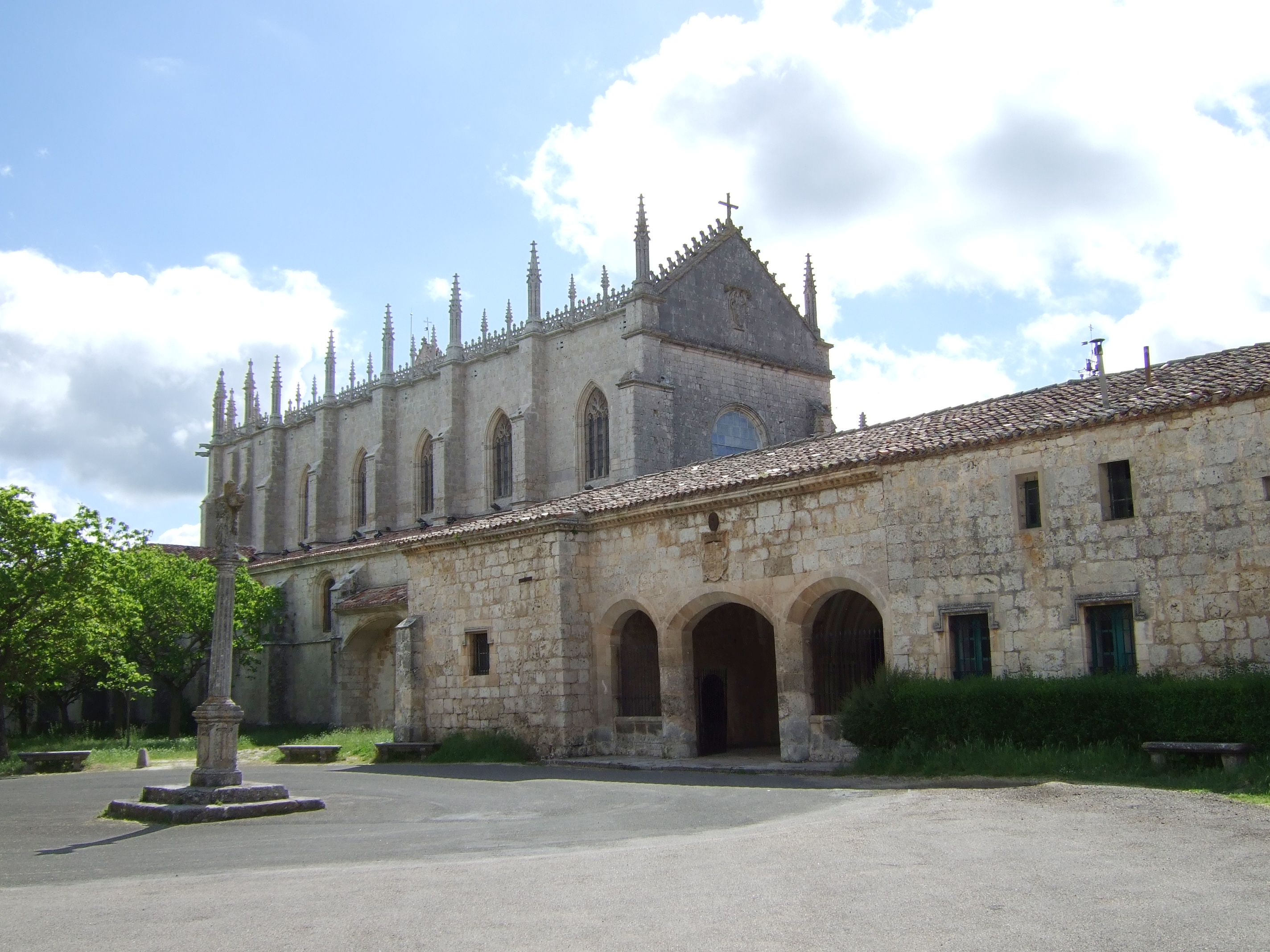
Miraflores Charterhouse, Burgos

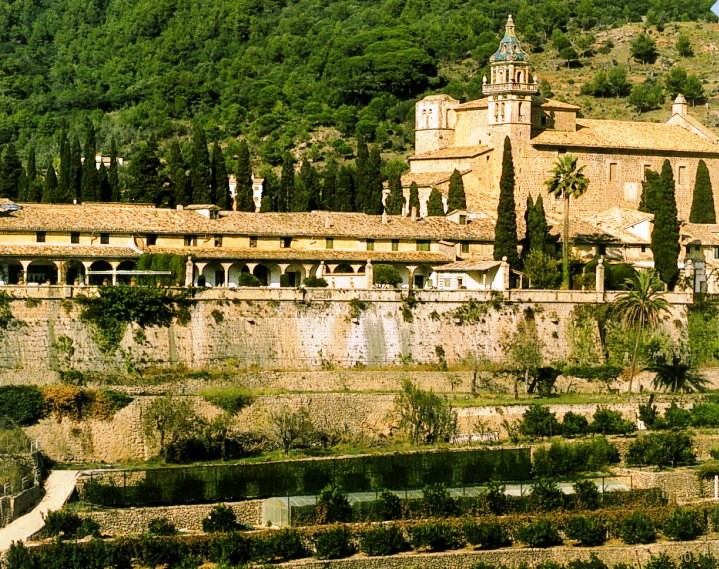
Valldemossa Charterhouse, Majorca

- Aniago Charterhouse (Cartuja de Aniago), Aniago, Villanueva de Duero, Valladolid (Castile) (1442–1808; 1815–1835)
- Charterhouse of the Annunciation (Cartuja de la Annonciade), at Micer Bas near Valencia (1442–45; unsuccessful foundation from nearby Porta Coeli)
- Ara Christi Charterhouse (Cartuja de Ara Christi), El Puig, near Valencia (1585–1808; 1815–1835)
- Ara Coeli Charterhouse (Cartuja de Ara Coeli), Lerida (1588–1596)
- Aula Dei Charterhouse (Cartuja de Aula Dei), Zaragoza (1564–1808, 1815–1835; 1901–2011; re-purchased in 1901 for the exiled French communities of Valbonne and Vauclaire, who arrived in that year in Cardeña and occupied Aula Dei in 1902; wound up, and premises transferred to the Chemin Neuf in 2012)
- Charterhouse of the Immaculate Conception (Cartuja de la Inmaculada Concepción), La Cartuja Baja near Zaragoza (1651–1835)
- La Cartuja, see Santa María de las Cuevas
- Cazalla Charterhouse (Cartuja de Cazalla de la Sierra, Cartuja de la Concepción), Cazalla de la Sierra; founded from Santa María de las Cuevas (1477–1834)
- Las Fuentes Charterhouse (Cartuja de Las Fuentes), Monegros near Lanaja, Cariñena (Huesca) (1507–1558; 1589–1808; 1814–1835)
- Granada Charterhouse (Cartuja de Granada), Granada (1516–1835)
- Jerez de la Frontera Charterhouse (Cartuja Jerez de la Frontera or Cartuja Santa María de la Defensión), Jerez de la Frontera (1463–1835; 1948–2001)
- Maresme Charterhouse (Cartuja de San Pablo del Mar de Maresme), Maresme, Arenys de Mar (Barcelona) (1269–1433; a Benedictine priory of Lérins Abbey founded no later than the 10th century; fell into ruin and bought by the Carthusians in 1265; settled from Scala Dei 1269; community moved to Montalegre with the former community of Valparaíso, into which it was merged)
- Miraflores Charterhouse (Cartuja de Miraflores), Burgos (extant since 1441)
- Montalegre Charterhouse (Cartoixa Santa-Maria de Montalegre), Tiana near Barcelona (extant; canonesses regular to 1362, charterhouse 1415–1808, 1814–1820, 1823–1835, (1867–) 1901–1939, 1944–)
- El Paular Charterhouse (Cartuja de Santa Maria de El Paular), Rascafría near Madrid (1390–1835; part of the premises have been occupied by Benedictine monks since 1954; the remainder is a hotel)
- Porta Coeli Charterhouse (Cartuja de Porta Coeli) near Valencia (1272–1800s; renewed 1946, still extant)
- Santa María de las Cuevas Charterhouse (Cartuja de Santa María de las Cuevas), on the island of La Cartuja on the Guadalquivir near Seville ( 1398–1810, established in a former Franciscan friary; 1816–1820; 1823–1835)
- Scala Dei Charterhouse (Cartoixa Scala Dei or Escaladei), La Morera de Montsant (1285–1769)
- Tarragona Distillery, Tarragona (1903–1933; distillery of chartreuse established here in 1883; exiled French distiller monks from Fourvoirie moved here in 1903 and began production in 1904; returned to Fourvoirie in 1933; but a small community of 3-4 continued distillation at Tarragona until 1989)
- Vall de Cristo Charterhouse (Cartuja Vall de Cristo) (1385–1835)
- Valldemossa Charterhouse (Cartuja Valldemossa), Valldemossa (Majorca) (1339–1835)
- Vallparadís or Valparaíso Charterhouse (Cartoixa de Vallparadís), Terrassa near Barcelona (1345–1415)
- Via Coeli Charterhouse (Cartuja de Santa María Via Coeli), Orihuela (Alicante) (1640–1681) (unable to find suitable premises, and foundation eventually abandoned)

=== Sweden ===
- Mariefred Charterhouse, formerly Gripsholm Charterhouse, Mariefred, formerly Gripsholm, near Stockholm (1493–1526)

=== Switzerland ===
- Basel, see St. Margaretenthal
- Bern, see Thorberg
- Géronde Charterhouse, Sierre (from before 1233 to 1331, Augustinian Canons; 1331–c. 1355/60, Carthusians; 1425–1644, Carmelites; 1651–60, Jesuits; 1803–05 and 1831–34, Trappists; Dominicans 1870–73)
- Ittingen Charterhouse in Warth (Thurgau) (from before 1152 to 1461, Augustinian Canons; 1461–1848, Carthusians)
- La Lance Charterhouse (Chartreuse du Saint-Lieu de la Lance), Concise (Vaud) (1317/20–1538)
- Loèche, château, Agarn (Valais) (1901–1903; house of refuge for exiled French community from Le Reposoir)
- Oujon Charterhouse near Arzier (Vaud) (1146/49–1537)
- La Part-Dieu Charterhouse in Vaudens, Gruyères (Fribourg) (1307–1848)
- Rosière, château, Grolley (Fribourg) (1902–1904; house of refuge for exiled French community from Grande Chartreuse)
- St. Margarethental Charterhouse in Basel (1401–1529/36)
- Saxon, casino and hotel, Saxon (Valais) (1901–1904; house of refuge for exiled French communities from Bosserville, Portes and Sélignac)
- Thorberg Charterhouse, now Schloss Thorberg, in Krauchthal (Bern) (1397–1528)
- Val de la Paix Charterhouse (Villa pacis) in Chandrossel (1327–after 1333)
- La Valsainte Charterhouse near Cerniat (Fribourg) (Carthusians 1294/95–1778; Trappists 1791–98, 1802–12 and 1814–15; Redemptorists 1818–26; recovered by Carthusians 1863, still extant)

=== United Kingdom ===
==== England ====
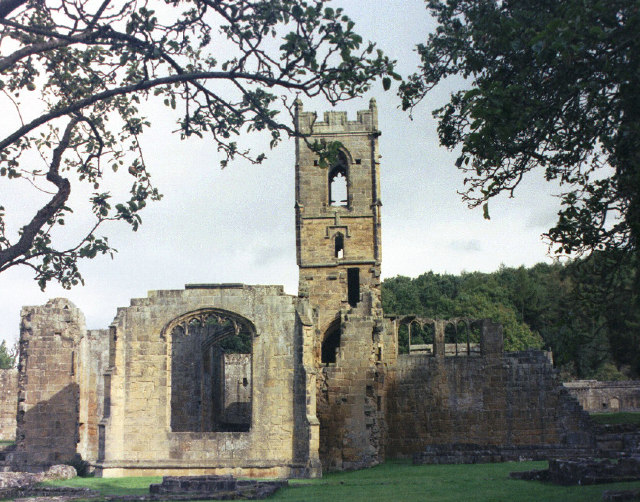
Mount Grace Priory

- Axholme Charterhouse, near Epworth, Lincolnshire (1397–1538)
- Beauvale Priory, Nottinghamshire (1343–1539)
- Coventry Charterhouse, Coventry (1381–1539)
- Hinton Priory, Somerset; founded at Hatherop, Gloucestershire in 1222, moved to Hinton in 1227 (1222–1539)
- Hull Charterhouse, Kingston upon Hull, East Riding of Yorkshire (1377–1539)
- London Charterhouse (1370–1538)
- Mount Grace Priory, North Yorkshire (1398–1539)
- Sheen Priory otherwise Richmond Priory, Surrey (1414–1539)
- St. Hugh's Charterhouse, Parkminster, Cowfold, Horsham, West Sussex (extant; founded 1873; in 1903, received exiled French community of Montreuil, as well as the novices of Bosserville and Sélignac [c. 100 monks]. In 1913, the order's printing works from Tournai were installed here, where they remained until 1954).
- Witham Charterhouse, Somerset (1178/79–1539)

==== Scotland ====
- Perth Charterhouse, Perth (1429–1567)

== Americas and Asia ==
=== Argentina ===
- San José Charterhouse (Cartuja San José), Deán Funes, Córdoba Province (extant since 1999)
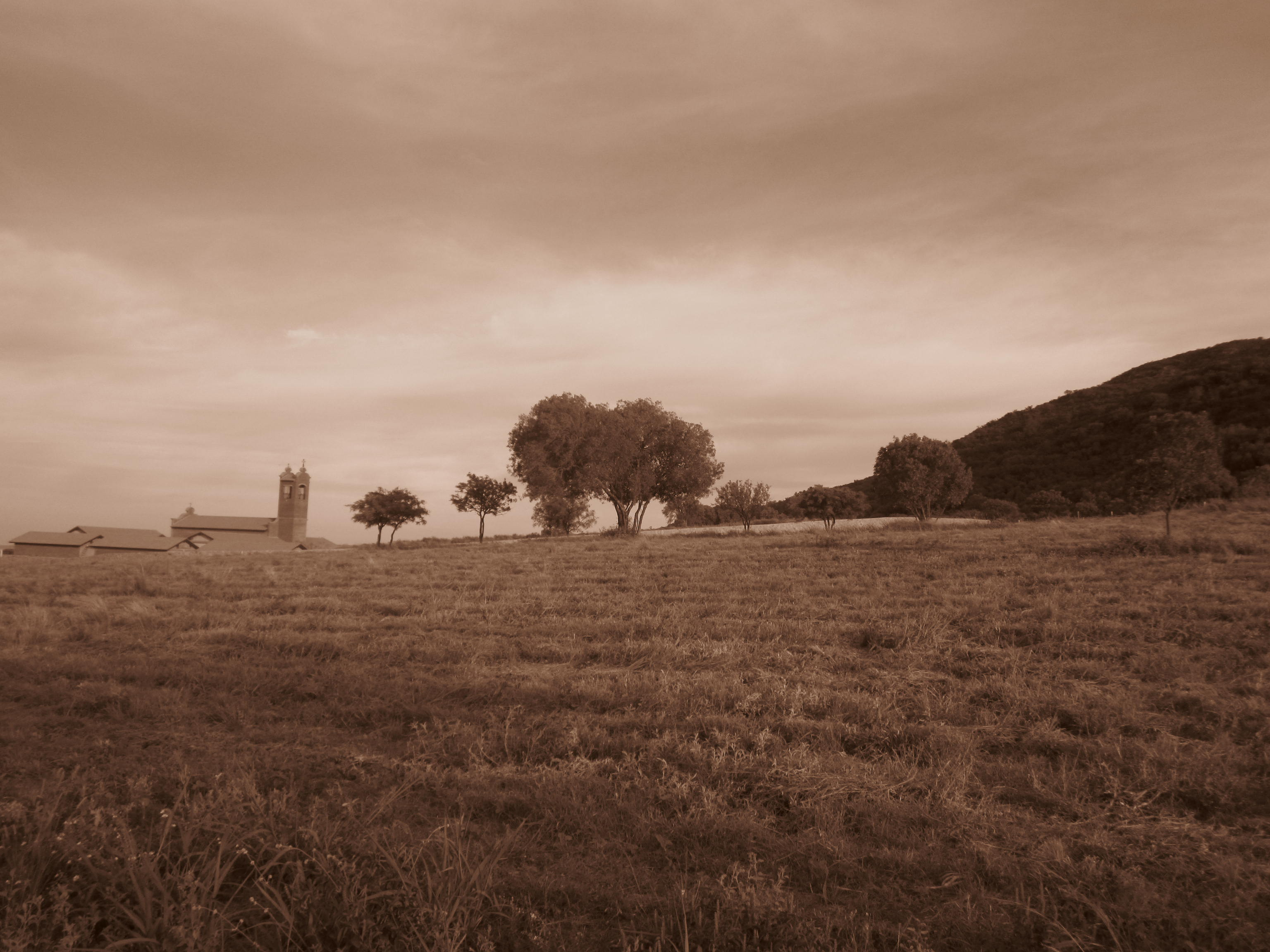
  San José Charterhouse, Argentina

=== Brazil ===
- Cartuxa Nossa Senhora Medianeira, Ivorá (Rio Grande do Sul) (extant since 1984)

=== South Korea ===
- Charterhouse Our Lady of Korea, Sangju (extant since 2004)

=== United States ===
- Sky Farm (Charterhouse of Our Lady of Bethlehem), near Whitingham (Vermont) (1950–60; community moved eventually to Transfiguration)
- Charterhouse of the Transfiguration, Sandgate (Vermont) (extant since 1970–71)

== Charterhouses for women ==
=== Belgium ===
- Burdinne, château, Huy (Liège) (1906–1928) (house of refuge for exiled French community from Le Gard; moved on to Nonenque)
- St. Anne's Charterhouse (Kartuize Sint-Anna ter Woestijne or Chartreuse Sainte-Anne-au-Désert; "St. Anne's Charterhouse in the Desert") in Sint-Andries, later Bruges (1348–1783; in Bruges from 1580)

=== France ===
- La Bastide-Saint-Pierre Charterhouse (Chartreuse Saints-Coeurs-de-Jésus-et-Marie), Labastide-Saint-Pierre (Tarn-et-Garonne) (1854–1903; exiled to Riva, later moved to Pinerolo)
- Beauregard Charterhouse (Chartreuse Sainte-Croix de Beauregard), Coublevie (Isère) (1821/22–1978; founded by survivors of the pre-revolutionary community of Prémol; moved 1978 to Reillanne)
- Bertaud Charterhouse (Chartreuse Notre-Dame de Bertaud or Notre-Dame d'Aurouse), Rabou (Hautes-Alpes) (1188–1446, then moved to Durbon)
- La Celle-Roubaud Charterhouse, also known as Sainte-Roseline Charterhouse (Chartreuse Sainte-Roseline de la Celle-Roubaud), Les Arcs (Var) (previously Benedictine nuns; 1260–1499 Carthusian nuns; from 1504, Franciscans)
- Durbon Charterhouse (Chartreuse Notre Dame de Durbon), Saint-Julien-en-Beauchêne (Hautes-Alpes) (monks 1116–1791; nuns, originally from Bertaud, occupied the dependencies 1446–1601)
- Eymeu Charterhouse (Chartreuse Eymeu Bonlieu) in Romans-sur-Isère (Isère) (1300–1309; thereafter Benedictines)
- Le Gard Charterhouse (Chartreuse Notre-Dame du Gard), Belloy-sur-Somme (Somme) (Cistercians 1137–1792; Carthusian nuns 1871–1906; exiled to Burdinne, resettled at Nonenque 1928)
- Gigondas, see Prébayon and Saint-André
- Gosnay, see Mont-Sainte-Marie
- Mélan Charterhouse (Chartreuse Notre-Dame de Mélan), Taninges (Haute-Savoie) (1283–1793; women's collegiate foundation 1803–1906)
- Mont-Sainte-Marie Charterhouse (Chartreuse du Mont-Sainte-Marie de Gosnay, Chartreuse des Dames de Gosnay), Gosnay, Béthune (Pas-de-Calais) (1329–1792) (double monastery with Val-Saint-Esprit in Gosnay)
- Nonenque Charterhouse (Chartreuse Notre-Dame du Précieux Sang de Nonenque), Marnhagues-et-Latour (Aveyron) (extant; Cistercians 1139–1791; 1927 onwards, Carthusian nuns of the community at Burdinne formerly exiled from Le Gard)
- Parménie Charterhouse (Chartreuse de Parménie, Chartreuse du Val-Croissant au Mont de Sainte-Marie), Beaucroissant (Isère) (1257–1391, then transferred to Les Écouges)
- Poleteins Charterhouse (Chartreuse de Poleteins, Chartreuse de la Bienheureuse Marie de Poleteins; also Poletains, Polletains etc) in Mionnay (Ain) (c. 1245–1605, when the few remaining nuns were transferred to Salettes and the endowment to Lyon)
- Prébayon Charterhouse, later Saint-André-de-Ramières Charterhouse (Chartreuse de Prébayon, later known as Chartreuse Saint-André-de-Ramières), Gigondas, Beaumes-de-Venise (Vaucluse) (founded c. 611 as a nunnery under the Rule of Caesarius of Arles; moved site c. 962 to Saint-André-de-Ramières but retained the name of Prébayon until c. 1227; became Carthusian c. 1155; expelled from the Order in 1336 but continued Carthusian practice as an independent house; suppressed in 1734)
- Prémol Charterhouse (Chartreuse Notre-Dame de Prémol), Vaulnaveys-le-Haut (Isère) (1234–1792; survivors of this community founded Beauregard in 1821)
- Reillanne Charterhouse (Chartreuse Notre-Dame de Reillanne), Reillanne (Alpes-de-Haute-Provence) (extant; founded 1978 as a new home for the community of Beauregard)
- Roubaud, see La Celle-Roubaud
- Saint-André-de-Ramières, see Prébayon
- Sainte-Rosaline, see La Celle-Roubaud
- Salettes Charterhouse (Chartreuse de la Salle [or Cour] de Notre-Dame de Salettes), La Balme-les-Grottes, Crémieu (Isère) (1299–1792)

=== Italy ===
- Belmonte di Busca Charterhouse (Certosa Belmonte di Busca), Busca near Cuneo (c.1274–c.1285)
- Bricherasio Charterhouse or Molare di Bricherasio Charterhouse (Certosa di Bricherasio or di Molare di Bricherasio), Bricherasio (c.1277–1303; apparently governed together with Buonluogo; became Cistercian in 1303)
- Buonluogo Charterhouse (Certosa di Santa Maria di Buonluogo), Pinerolo (1223–1303; became Cistercian in 1303)
- Dego Charterhouse (Certosa della Trinità), Dego (extant since 1994; settled by community from San Francesco)
- Motta Grossa, see Riva
- Riva Charterhouse (Certosa di Riva, formerly Certosa di Motta Grossa), castle of Motta Grossa, Riva di Pinerolo (Turin) (1903–1998; house of refuge for the exiled French community of La-Bastide-Saint-Pierre; became an autonomous charterhouse in 1936; name changed from Motta Grossa to Riva in 1971; community moved to Vedana in 1998)
- San Francesco Charterhouse (Certosa di San Antonio di Padova), Giaveno (Turin) (1904–1994; former Franciscan convent; house of refuge for the exiled French community from Beauregard; autonomous charterhouse from 1912; moved to Dego 1994)
- Vedana Charterhouse (Certosa di Vedana), Sospirolo (1456–1977 as monastery; when the monks left in 1977, nuns from San Francesco moved here, and after they moved to Dego in 1998, were replaced by nuns from Riva; the nuns had left by 2018, when the premises were occupied by a community of nuns of the Perpetual Adoration of the Sacrament)

=== Republic of Korea ===
- Charterhouse of the Annunciation, Boeun (extant since 2002)

=== Spain ===
- Santa Maria de Benifassà, La Pobla de Benifassà near Vinaròs (Castellón) (extant since 1967; established in the premises of the former Cistercian Benifasar Abbey (1233–1835)
- Murviedro Charterhouse (Cartuja del Espíritu Santo di Murviedro), Murviedro (now Sagunto) (Valencia) (c.1389-c.1610)

== See also ==
- List of sites of the Dominican Order
- List of Jesuit sites
