= Charterhouse Our Lady of Korea =

Carthusian monastery in South Korea

- Charterhouse Our Lady of Korea
- 36.2814°N 127.9788°E
- Address: 251-70 Jungmo-ro, Modong-myeon, Sangju, North Gyeongsang Province, South Korea
- Denomination: Carthusian

History
- Status: Active
- Founded: 2002

Charterhouse Our Lady of Korea is a Carthusian monastery located in Sangju, South Korea. It was established in 2002, and as of 2022 is one of two Carthusian monasteries in Asia, with the other being Charterhouse of the Annunciation, also in South Korea.

It was the subject of a 2019 KBS documentary, entitled The Carthusian Cloistered Monastery.

In October 2022, a German priest was killed in a fire at the monastery.
