= San José Charterhouse =

Carthusian monastery in Argentina

Coordinates: 30.453034°S 64.281489°W

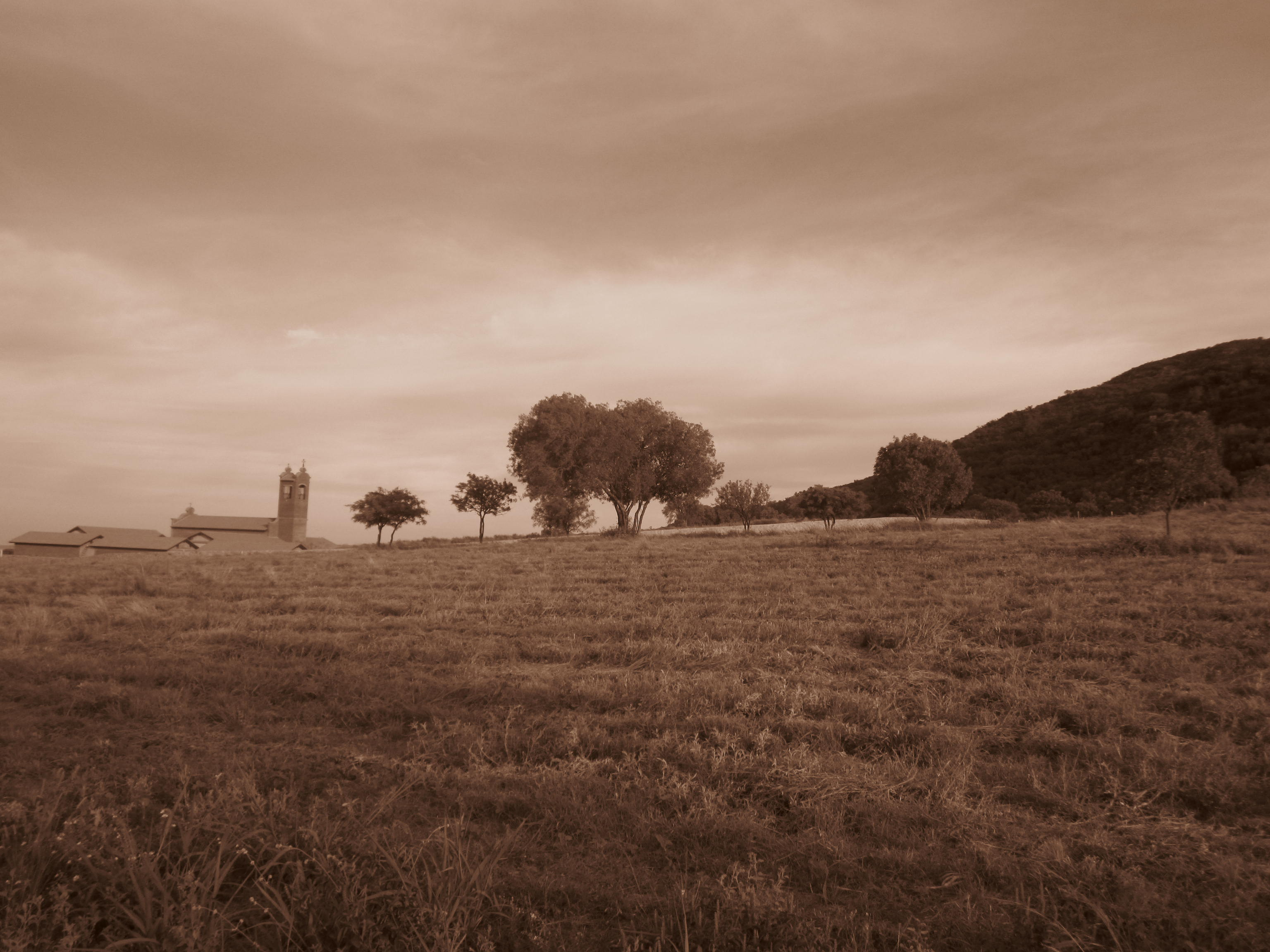
San José Charterhouse

San José Charterhouse (Spanish: Cartuja San José) is a Carthusian monastery dedicated to Saint Joseph which is located in the city of Deán Funes, Córdoba in Argentina. It is the third Carthusian monastery in the Americas and the second in Latin America.

== Foundation ==
The idea of establishing a charterhouse in Argentina emerged because those Argentinians who considered the Carthusian vocation had to emigrate to other countries. In 1997 the project was supported by the General Chapter of the Carthusian Order and by the Argentine Conference of Catholic Bishops. On that year, four Carthusian monks were sent from the Grand Chartreuse (the head monastery of the Carthusian Order) to Argentina to look for a suitable place for the new monastery. They found the ideal setting to establish the new charterhouse in the "Campo de la Trinidad", which is a secluded area near the city of Deán Funes, Córdoba.

== The Monastery ==
The architect who designed this charterhouse is Federico Shanahan. On October 15, 1998, a small part of the hermitage was inaugurated and, on March 19, 2004 (on Saint Joseph's Day), the whole building was completed and the church consecrated. The construction has 22 cells, several chapels, a refectory, a chapter house and a guesthouse. Nowadays, this monastery is inhabited by more than a dozen monks.

== Sources ==
- José Antonio Díaz Gómez, "La Cartuja de San José en Argentina: historia, patrimonio y singularidades de una cartuja contemporánea. Entrevista con Federico Shanahan", Revista Hispano Americana 7 (2017), 1-23. Real Academia Hispano Americana de Ciencias, Artes y Letras.
- "A Solas con Dios" (Alone with God) by Diario Clarín (26 March 2006)
- San José Charterhouse on the official web page of the Carthusian Order

== See also ==
- Photography exhibition "Luz y misterio. El secreto de los monjes" (by Eduardo Longoni)
