= Engelgarten Charterhouse =

Former monastery in Bavaria, Germany

Coordinates: 49°47′46″N 9°56′17″E

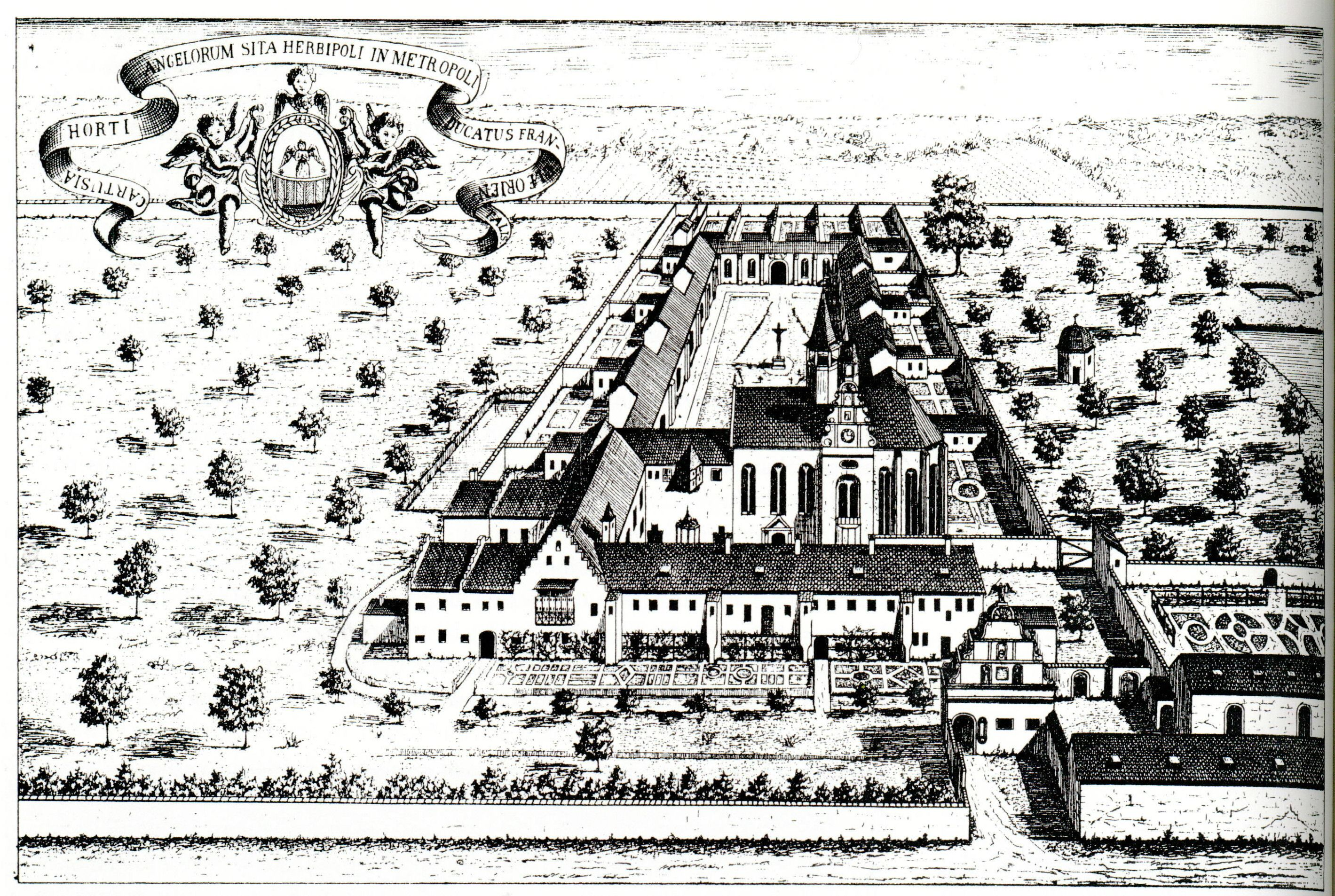
View of Würzburg Charterhouse

Engelgarten Charterhouse or Würzburg Charterhouse (German: Kartause Engelgarten; Latin: Hortus angelorum) is a former Carthusian monastery, or charterhouse, in Würzburg in Bavaria, Germany.

== History ==
The monastery was dedicated on 13 May 1352 by the bishop-elect of Würzburg Albrecht von Hohenlohe. The extensive monastery precinct, with church and outbuildings, gardens and fishponds, through which the Kürnach flowed, stretched from the present Berliner Ring as far as the Mainfranken Theater, on both sides of the modern Ludwigstrasse, where the hotel Zum Karthäuser and the street name Kartause still indicate the area's past.

During the Thirty Years' War Engelgarten gave refuge in 1631 to the Carthusian community from Grünau, who had been forced to take flight from the Swedes. Shortly afterwards, however, Würzburg was also taken, and the charterhouse was plundered.

The monastery was dissolved in 1803 during the secularisation of Bavaria. The church was given to the Protestants. In 1853 it was demolished to make way for the construction of the former railway station of the Ludwigs-West-Bahn, on the site of the present Mainfranken Theater.

== Sources and external links ==
- Klöster in Bayern (in German)
