= Nuremberg Charterhouse =

Coordinates: 49°26′53″N 11°04′35″E

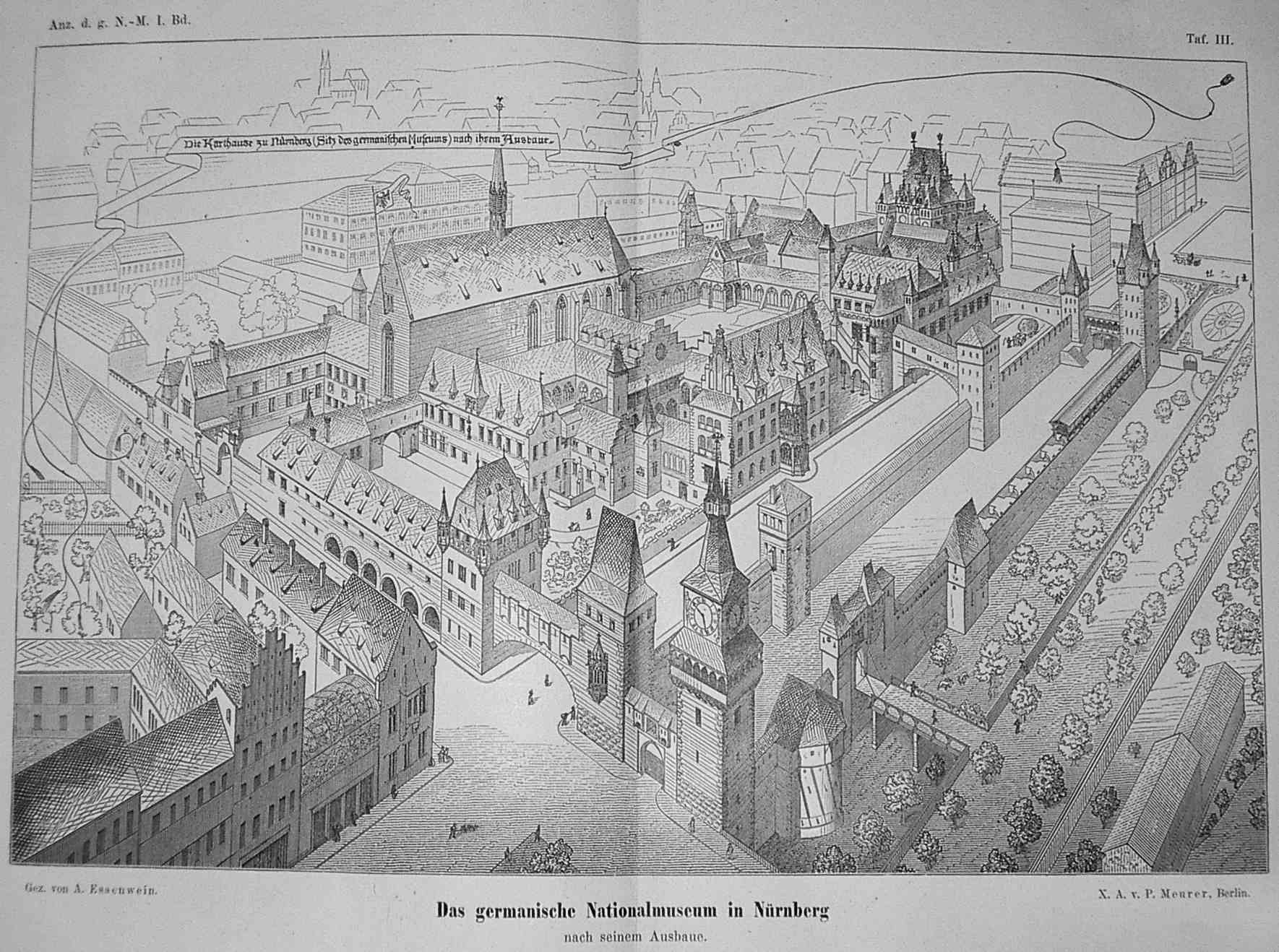
The Germanisches Nationalmuseum in 1884, incorporating the remains of the former Nuremberg Charterhouse

Nuremberg Charterhouse (Kartäuserkloster Nürnberg, also Kartause Marienzell) was a Carthusian monastery, or charterhouse, in Nuremberg in Germany. Its surviving premises are now incorporated into the Germanisches Nationalmuseum.

== History ==
The monastery was founded in 1380 for the Carthusian order by the merchant Marquard Mendel. The extensive building complex was erected outside the first city wall in the southern suburb of Nuremberg, between the convent of the Poor Clares and St. James's (Jakobskirche), the former church of the Teutonic Knights. The laying of the foundation stone of the monastery church took place on 16 February 1381, and was attended by Wenceslaus, King of the Romans, and the Papal Legate Cardinal Pileus. The first monks there are documented from as early as 1382, and the church is believed to have been consecrated in 1383 (or possibly 1387). In 1385 the founder, Marquard Mendel, was buried in the quire of the new church.

After the laying of the foundation stone (16 February 1381) the church, a Gothic structure with a single nave, was constructed in two portions: the eastern parts up to c. 1383/87 and the western extension until 1405 (according to dendrochronological investigation the roof timbers were felled in that year). At the same time as the church and the sacristy the chapter house was built on the south side of the church, producing a cruciform ground-plan. Probably shortly after 1459 the chapter-house received its own integral choir and the whole building was covered with a fan-vaulted ceiling.

The small courtyard was finished by 1405.

== Dissolution ==
During the Protestant Reformation many monks followed the teachings of Martin Luther and left their monasteries. Nuremberg Charterhouse was the only Carthusian monastery in Germany where so many did so that the monastery was dissolved, which it was, in 1525. Its assets were transferred to the general alms fund of the city. On part of the former monastic premises houses were built, and in 1552 the church was pressed into service as a gunpowder magazine. It was restored to religious use in 1615 as a Protestant church. From 1784 it was again a Roman Catholic church. In 1810 it was taken over by the Bavarian military authorities as a magazine, and also for stables.

In 1857 the remaining structures, severely damaged, were taken over by the Germanisches Nationalmuseum.

World War II caused substantial damage, including the destruction of the chapter house, which was investigated archaeologically in 1998.

Some of the once-monastic buildings round the church still survive, although often greatly changed in the re-building: the large and small courtyards with parts of the vaulted cloister as well as the monks' houses along its north range.

== Sources ==
- Dehio: Bayern I: Franken, 2. edn., Munich, 1999, pp. 766 ff.
- Günther P. Fehring und Anton Ress: Die Stadt Nürnberg. Kurzinventar, 2nd edn revised by Wilhelm Schwemmer, Munich: Dt. Kunstverl. 1977 [reprint 1982] (Bayerische Kunstdenkmale; 10), pp. 198 ff.
- Claudia Frieser, Die archäologische Untersuchung des ehemalige Kapitelsaals im Kartäuserkloster zu Nürnberg, in Anzeiger des Germanischen Nationalmuseums 2000, pp. 67–75
- G. Ulrich Großmann: Architektur und Museum - Bauwerk und Sammlung, Ostfildern-Ruit 1997 (= Kulturgeschichtliche Spaziergänge im Germanischen Nationalmuseum, Bd.1), passim and esp. pp. 12–26
- Sabina Fulloni, Untersuchungen am Dachstuhl der Marienkirche des Kartäuserklosters zu Nürnberg, in: Anzeiger des Germanischen Nationalmuseums 2001, pp. 177–183
- Hermann Maué: Die Bauten der Kartause von ihrer Gründung 1380 bis zur Übernahme durch das Museum im Jahre 1857, in: Bernward Deneke and Rainer Kahsnitz (eds): Das Germanische Nationalmuseum. Nuremberg, 1852-1977. Beiträge zu seiner Geschichte, Munich/Berlin 1978, pp. 315–356
