= Montebenedetto Charterhouse =

Former Carthusian monastery in Piedmont, Italy

Coordinates: 45°05′42″N 7°11′26″E

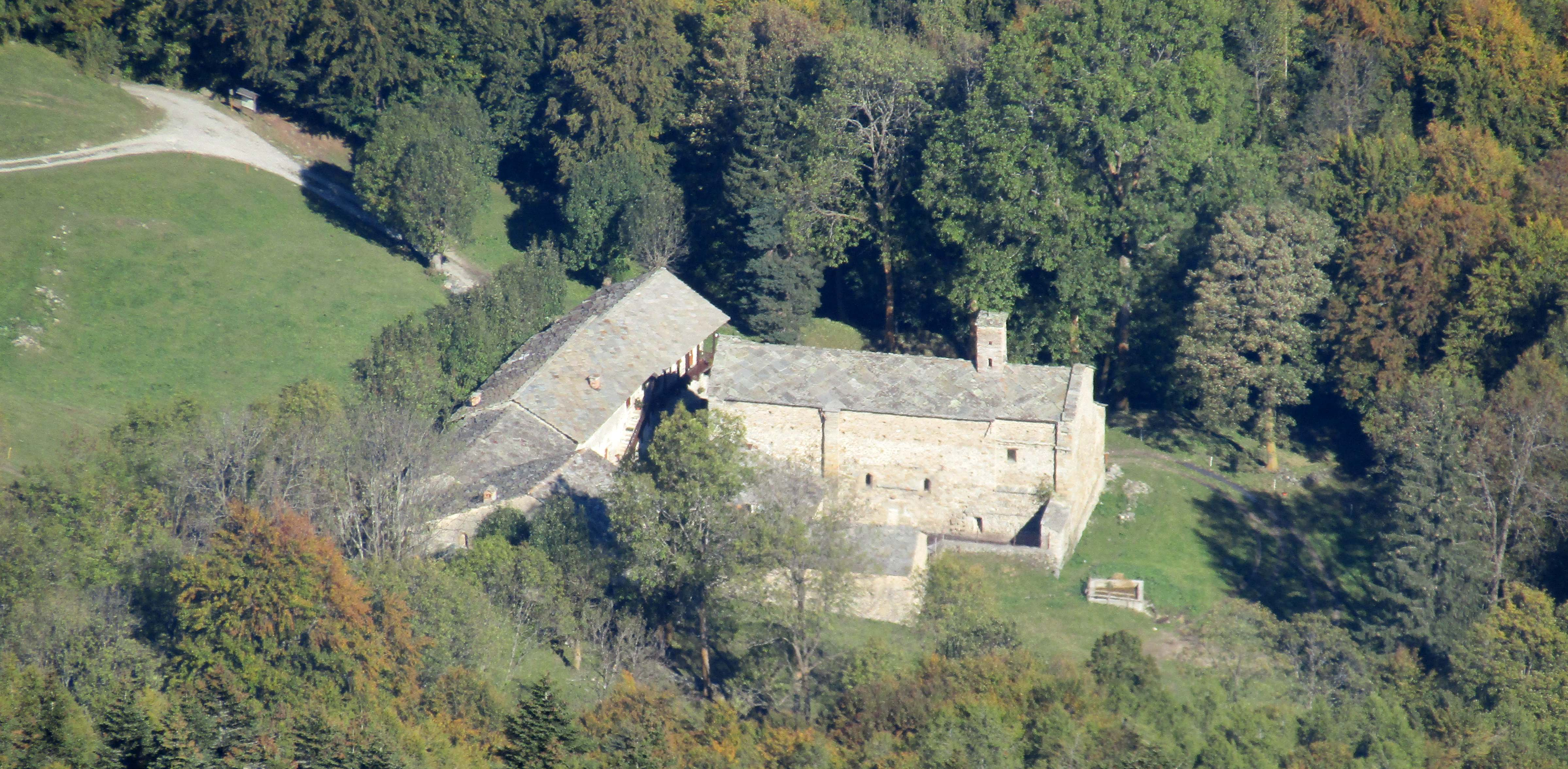

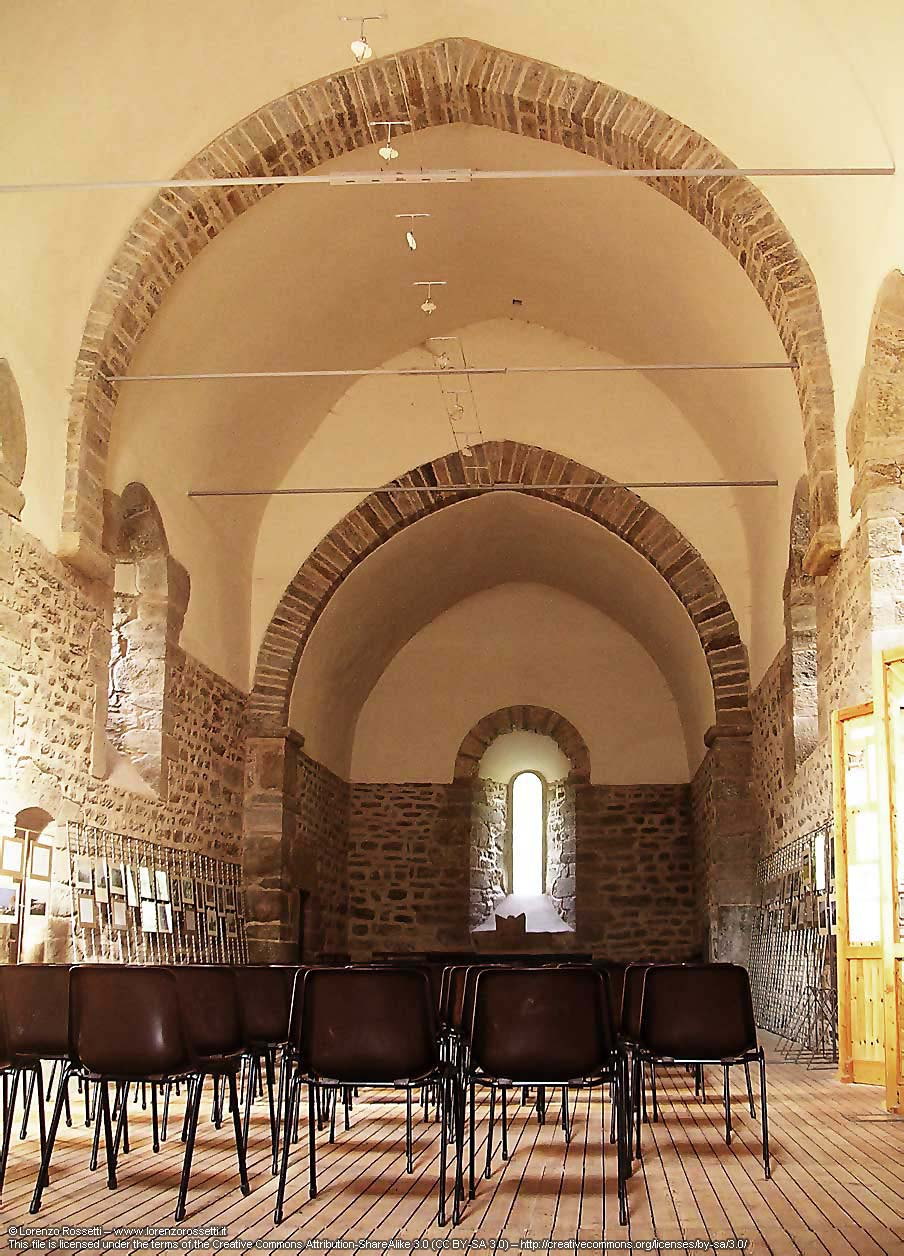
Church interior

Montebenedetto Charterhouse (Italian: Certosa di Montebenedetto) is a former Carthusian monastery (or charterhouse) in the Val di Susa in Piedmont, Northern Italy.

== History ==
In 1189-91 the Carthusians founded Losa Charterhouse (Certosa della Losa) at Losa in Gravere. The site quickly proved unsuitable and the monks built a new monastery on lands given by Tommaso of Moriana, Montebenedetto Charterhouse, which the Losa community occupied in 1197 or 1198.

In 1205 the charterhouse, which already owned the Orsiera valley, acquired the estate of Banda, situated lower down the mountains and more accessible than the monastery, where they established a grange, the monastery infirmary and a guest house.

During the 15th century pressure grew within the monastery for the community to move down to the valley floor. In 1473 the premises were largely destroyed in a flood, and in 1498 the monks re-settled to expanded premises at Banda, from then onwards Banda Charterhouse. From this date the premises at Montebenedetto were reduced to the status of a grange and came to be used as a farmstead. The community at Banda moved in 1598 to Avigliana Charterhouse, but Charles Emmanuel I, Duke of Savoy, had the buildings destroyed for defensive reasons in 1630. The dispossessed monks were given Collegno Charterhouse in 1642, but in the intervening years temporarily reoccupied the buildings at Montebenedetto and Banda.

Repair and restoration works took in 1987 and 2000, focussing on the monastic church.

== Location and structure ==
Montebenedetto is situated at an altitude of 1,120 metres above sea level, in a clearing surrounded by woods, next to the Fontane river. It is now part of the comune of Villar Focchiardo.

The best-preserved part of the monastery is the former Carthusian church (built in the Romanesque style in the 13th century). The great and small cloisters, the cells and the buildings of the lay brothers were damaged in the flood and fell into ruin after the monastery was abandoned.
