= Xanten Charterhouse =

Former monastery in Germany

Coordinates: 51°39′47″N 6°27′16.4″E

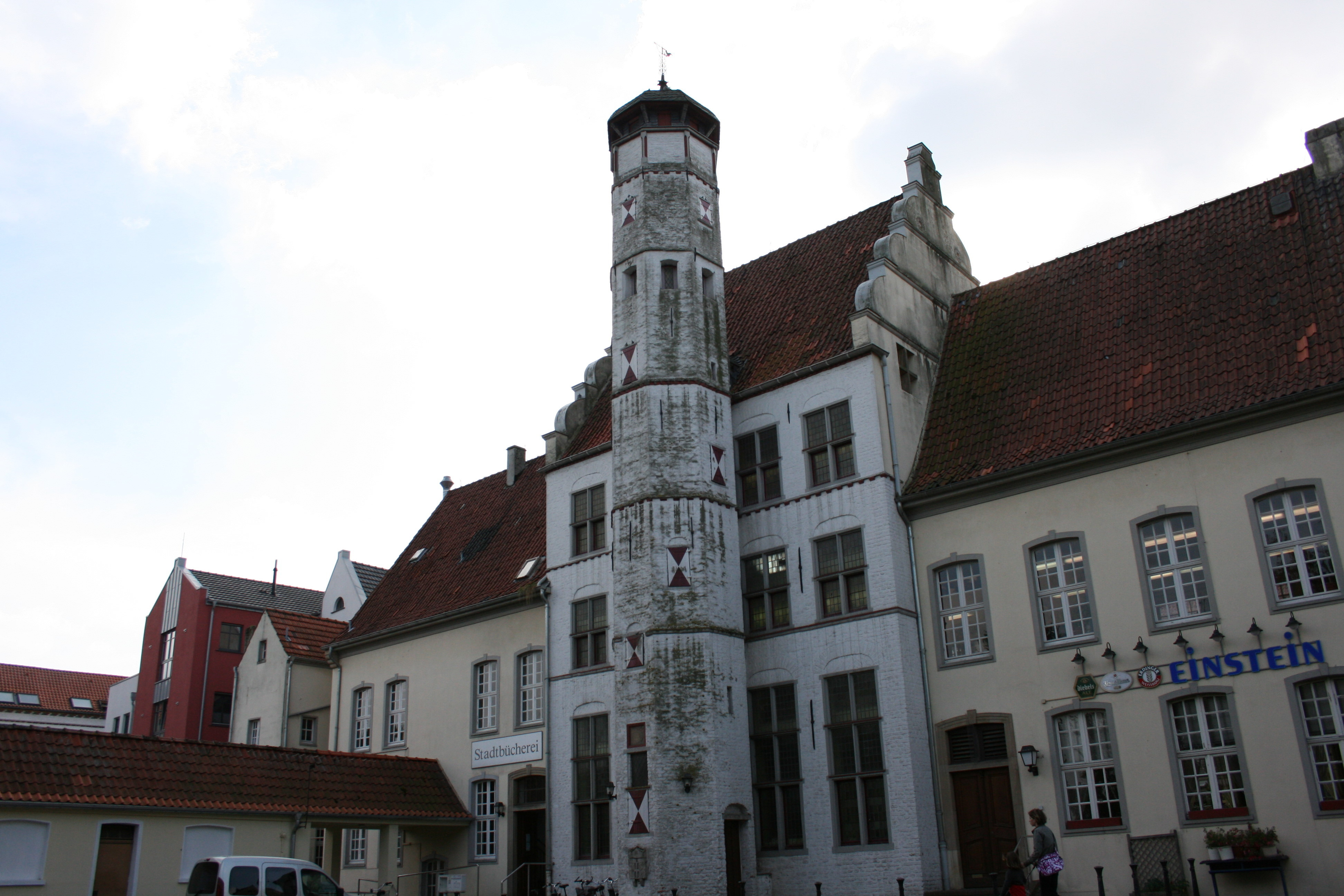
The former charterhouse building

Xanten Charterhouse (German: Karthaus Xanten) is a former Carthusian monastery, or charterhouse, in Xanten, North Rhine-Westphalia, Germany. The monastery was originally founded in 1417 in Flüren near Wesel but was moved to Xanten in 1628. It was suppressed in 1802 during the secularisation of Germany under Napoleon. The buildings passed into private ownership and later into the ownership of the town of Xanten.

The upper part of the premises is now used as the town library, while on the ground floor is a bar and restaurant.

== Sources ==
- Robert Scholten: Das Karthäuserkloster Insula Reginae Caeli auf der Grave bei Wesel. In: Annalen des Historischen Vereins für den Niederrhein, 52 (1891), pp. 61–136 (online version)
- Goder, Harald (2004). "Wesel, Xanten". In Schlegel, Gerhard; Hogg, James (eds.). Monasticon Cartusiense. Vol. 2. Salzburg. pp. 630–637 & 660–665.
- Michael Lehmann: Die Karthaus in Xanten. Ein Beitrag zur Gebäudegeschichte unter besonderer Berücksichtigung der Jahre 1933 bis 1945. Jahrbuch Kreis Wesel, Kreisarchiv Wesel, 2015, pp. 196–204
