= Ilmbach Charterhouse =

Former monastery in Bavaria, Germany

Coordinates: 49°48′14″N 10°24′32″E

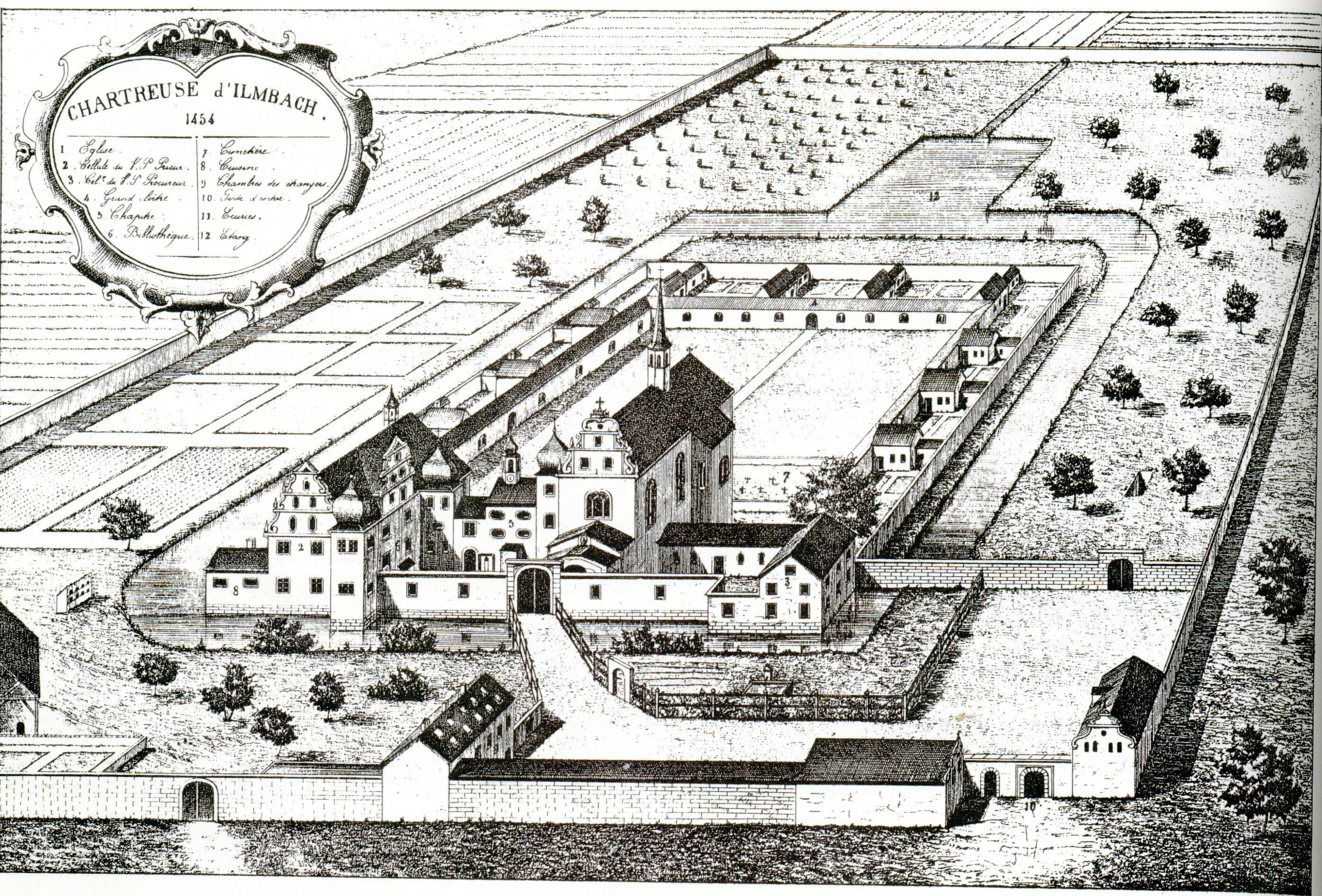
Ilmbach Charterhouse as it was before 1634; view from Maisons de l'Ordre des Chartreux vol. IV.

Ilmbach Charterhouse, also Mariengarten Charterhouse (German: Kloster or Kartause Ilmbach; Kartause Mariengarten), is a former Carthusian monastery, or charterhouse, in Prichsenstadt in Bavaria, Germany.

== History ==
The monastery, dedicated to Our Lady, was founded in 1453 by the knight Balthasar Fere vom Berge and his wife Magdalena von Vestenberg. It was burnt down in 1525 during the Peasants' War but was rebuilt and reoccupied within two years with the help of the Bishop of Würzburg.

It was dissolved in 1803 in the secularisation of Bavaria.

The property was purchased by Baron Friedel, who installed a cheese factory and a sugar factory in the premises. In 1836 there were still remains of the monastery church, but these have disappeared. On the site of the charterhouse a hunting lodge was later constructed.

The only structural survival is the main entrance gateway, built of sandstone in the 17th century. At the dissolution a local farmer moved it to his farm in Gräfenneuses in Geiselwind near Bamberg, where it still stands.
