= Peter Blomevenna =

Carthusian writer (1466–1536)

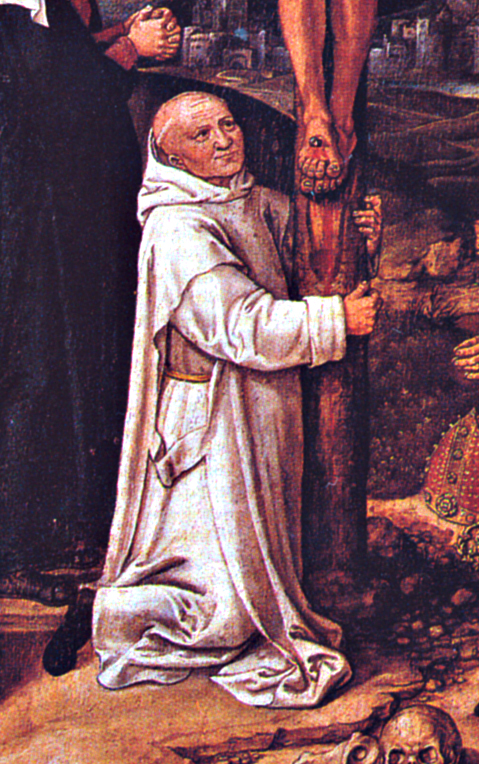
Peter Blommeveen by Anton Woensam (1535)

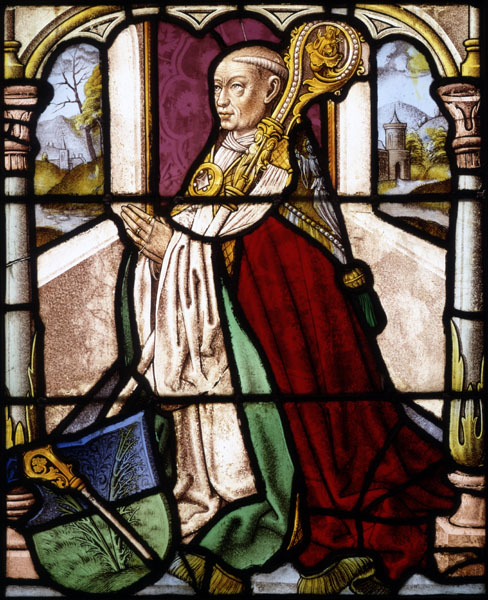
Stained glass window of Peter Blomevenna (1510–1530)

Peter Blomevenna Cart. (Dutch: Pieter Blommeveen; 29 March 1466 in Leiden – 14 August 1536 in Cologne) was a Carthusian author and prior of Cologne Charterhouse from 1507 to 1536.

He was a translator of Denis the Carthusian, among many other works, and an active opponent of early Protestantism. He was a close friend of Werner Rolewinck (died 1502).

== Biography ==
Because of the avarice of his parents, although they belonged to a wealthy background, he spent his first years in poverty and difficulties. He studied at the Faculty of Arts in Cologne from 1483, then entered the Carthusian monks in 1489 where he professed his vows on 7 March 1490. He is distinguished by his piety and his intellectual capacities. He was a close friend of the Carthusian Werner Rolevinck.

In 1506, he was elected prior of the Charterhouse of Cologne, a position he assumed until his death. During troubled times, he emphasized a more personal mystique and the demands of the rule of his order. The Charterhouse flourished under his priorate, with between 16 and 25 professed monks and 16 to 17 lay brothers, and quickly became an intellectual and mystical center of its day. Taking advantage of the progress of the printing press, it published authors including Harphius, Johannes Tauler, Henry Suso, Lanspergius (disciple of Peter Blomevenna), Ruysbroeck, Denis the Carthusian (1424–1471).

In 1520–1530, Peter had an extension built outside the monastery cloister in order to receive visitors wishing to follow the spiritual direction of the Carthusians. The anonymous editor of La Perle évangélique was among these, as were the first Jesuits (Peter Faber and Peter Canisius); pious beguines like Marie Van Houte d'Oisterwijk likely attended as well.

Gérard Kalkbrenner (1494–1566) succeeded him as prior.

== Works ==
He composed treatises, some of which were controversial (against the Anabaptists for example, who had seized Münster in February 1534). In his Enchiridion sacerdotum (1532), he clarified the mystery of the Holy Eucharist. His De Bonitate divina inspired many preachers. In 1509, he published Le Miroir de perfection by the Flemish Franciscan Harphius (1410–1477) and also translated his treatise Directorium Aureum Contemplativorum into Latin which he supplemented with explanatory notes. He edited many texts by Denis the Carthusian and opposed the growing Reformation in Assertio Purgatorii (1534) about Purgatory and the Anabaptists, in De Auctoriate Ecclesiaein (1535) on the teaching authority of the Church, in De Vario Modo adorandi Deum, Sanctos et eorum Imagines (1535) about images and the worship of God in beauty, and Candela Evangelica (1536).

He wrote an introduction to D. Dionysii Carthusiani Contra Alchoranum and sectam Machometicam libri quinque against the "Mohammedan sect".

The writings of Peter Blomevenna were printed in 1538 by Dietrich Loher.

=== Partial list of works ===
- Sermo de Sancte Brunone (1516)
- Vita sancti Brunonis (1516)
- De bonitate divina
- Modus legendi Rosarium B. Mariæ Virginis (published at the end of Harphius ' Directorium aureum contemplativorum, published in 1509, 1510 and 1513) concerning the Carthusian rosary
- Enchiridion sacerdotum in quo quae ad divinissimam Eucharistiam et sacratissimae Missae officium attinent (1532)
- D. Dionysii Carthusiani, de his quae secundas Sacras Scripturas et orthodoxorum patrum sententias ... catholice credantur ... [cum epistolae noncupatoriis P. Blomevennae and T. Loer a Stratis] (1535)
