= Laurentius Surius =

German Carthusian hagiographer and church historian

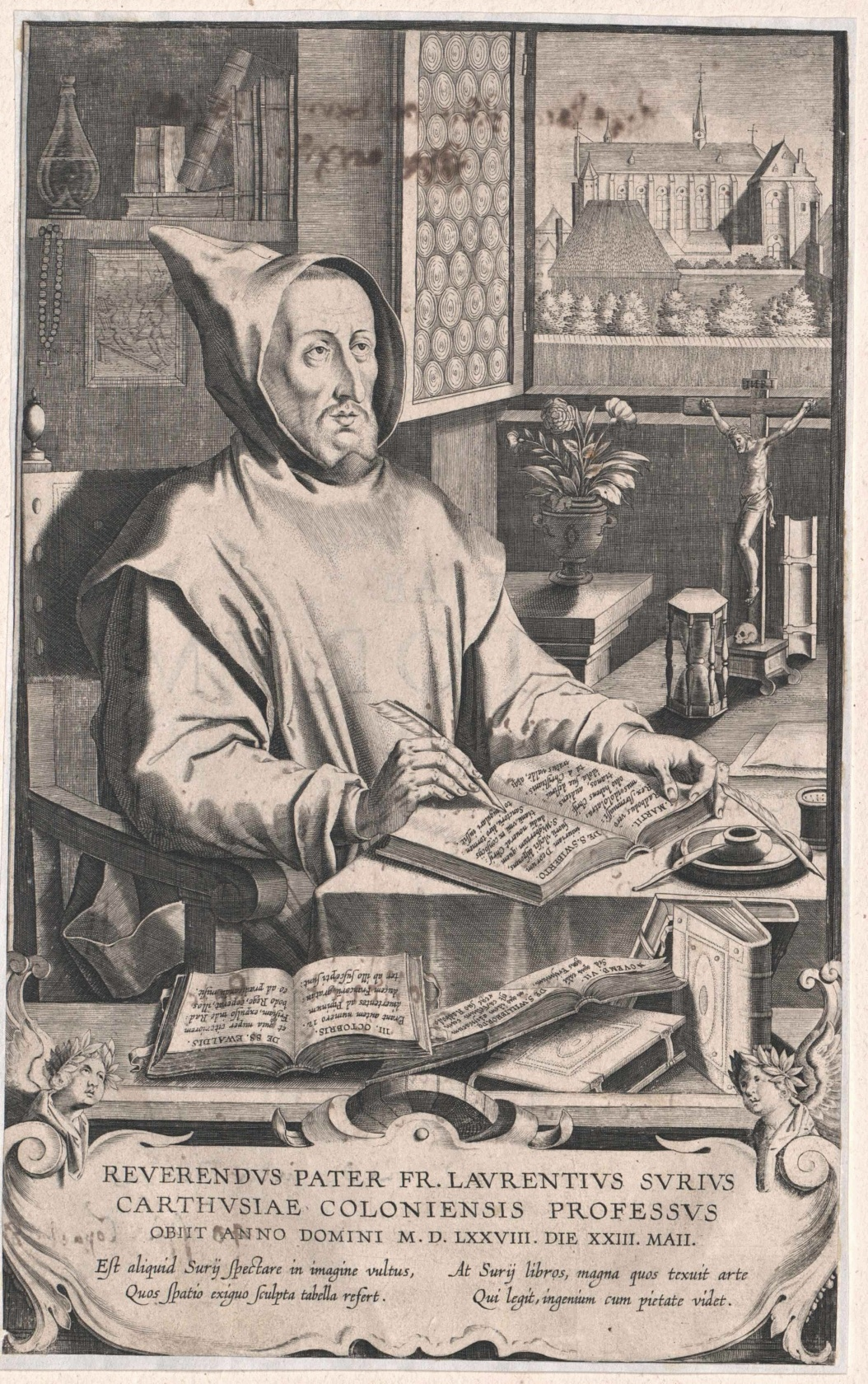
Engraving of Surius, 1580

Laurentius Surius (translating to Lorenz Sauer; Lübeck, 1523 – Cologne, 23 May 1578) was a German Carthusian hagiographer and church historian.

== Biography ==
Laurentius Surius was born in Lübeck in 1523, to a wealthy and respected family. His father was a goldsmith. It is not certain whether his parents were Catholics or Lutherans. Peter Canisius suggests that he was born a Protestant. Surius' brother became a canon at Lübeck.

In 1534 Surius began studies at the University of Frankfort-on-the-Oder. He may have left there due to an outbreak of the plague in 1536. He then went to Cologne, where he obtained a bachelor's degree in 1537, and a Master of Arts in 1539. Canisius was a fellow-student at Cologne. "His friendship with Canisius led to a fascination with Reform Catholicism, which combined his interests in the Reformation, Humanism, and the Early Church."

With his credentials, Surius could have had a university career, but he met Lanspergius, who induced him to enter the Carthusian monastery of Saint Barbara at Cologne, in 1542. He made his vows in 1541 and was ordained a priest two years later.

Except for a brief stay at the charterhouse in Mainz, the greater part of his life after this was spent in his monastery, where he was a model of piety, of rigid observance of the rules of the order, and of earnest work as a scholar; for these reasons he was held in high esteem by St. Pius V.

Surius died in Cologne on May 25, 1578.

== Works ==
Surius wrote many works on church history and hagiography. He translated into Latin editions of German mystics of the later Middle Ages, such as Johannes Tauler, Henry Suso, and John of Ruysbroeck. He presented the works in Latin in order to make them more accessible to a broader European readership.

Around 1556, Surius took up controversialist literature, translating a treatise by the Dominican Johann Fabri, and one by Johannes Gropper on the body and blood of Christ; also the sermons of Michael Sidonius, the apologies of Friedrich Staphylus, and an oration by Martin Eisengrein. He completed the Institutiones of Florentius of Haarlem, prior of the Carthusians of Louvain, and edited a new edition of the Homiliarium of Charlemagne. He wrote against Sleidanus his "Commentarius brevis rerum in orbe gestarum ab a. 1500 ad a. 1564" (Cologne, 1566), which was continued by others, including Michael ab Isselt.

Turning to church history, in 1561, he published an edition of the works of Pope Leo I. He also published in 1567 a collection of the Acts of the councils: Concilia omnia tum generalia tum provincialia (4 vols., Cologne, 1567). He followed this in 1539 with a collection of sermons by Alcuin.

=== Hagiography ===
His major work is his collection of the lives of the saints, De probatis Sanctorum historiis ab Al. Lipomano olim conscriptis nunc primum a Laur. Surio emendatis et auctis, the first edition of which appeared in six volumes at Cologne in 1570–75. He began a second edition which was finished after his death by his colleague in the monastery, Mosander, who added a seventh volume (Cologne, 1582). A third edition with an improved text appeared at Cologne in 1618; a new and revised edition was published (1875–80) at Turin in 13 volumes. Surius gave credit to some fabulous accounts. Derived works on lives of the saints have been published in various languages.
