= Henry of Kalkar =

German theological writer (1328–1408)

Henry of Kalkar, otherwise Heinrich Eger (or Egher) of Kalkar (1328 – 20 December 1408), was a Carthusian theological writer.

== Life ==
Henry was born at Kalkar in the Duchy of Cleves. He began his studies at Cologne, and completed them at Paris, where he became Master of Arts in 1357. He forthwith occupied the post of "procurator of the German nation" in 1358, being also a professor of theology.

Having obtained canonries in the collegiate churches of Saint Suitbert in Kaiserswerth and St. George in Cologne in 1362, he returned to his native land. Soon after, however, disgusted with the world, he resigned his benefices and retired in 1365 to the Cologne Charterhouse, where, owing to his talents and virtues, he was rapidly raised to the most important offices.

Successively prior of the charterhouses of Arnhem (1368–72), of Roermond (1372–77), newly founded, of Cologne (1377–84) and of Strasbourg (1384–96), which he restored, and from 1375 provincial visitor for the space of 20 years, he was thus called upon to play, under the circumstances produced by the Great Schism, a considerable role in the Netherlands and German-speaking countries.

Relieved at length, at his own request, of all his offices, he retired in 1396 to Cologne Charterhouse, and there lived in recollection and prayer until his death.

Henry was celebrated not only as a writer, but also as a reformer. During his priorate at Arnhem he had the happiness and honour of "converting" one of his friends and fellow-students at Paris, Gerard Groote (the future founder of the Brothers of the Common Life), whom he attracted into his charterhouse and directed for three years. "Moreover by his spiritual writings ... he exercised on the whole school of Deventer and Windesheim the influence of a recognized master." He was to this extent the organizer of the great movement of the Catholic Renaissance, which, initiated at Windesheim and in the convents of the Low Countries, went on developing throughout the 15th century, finding its definite expression in the Council of Trent.

Kalkar contributed to the development of the rosary when, in 1365 he grouped the 150 Angelic Salutations into fifteen groups of ten (decades), with an Our Father before each, and with each decade referring to an event in the life of Jesus and Mary. He died in Cologne on 20 December 1408.

Peter Canisius went so far as to insert his name in his German martyrology for 20 December.

== Works ==
As a writer Kalkar has left a number of works treating a variety of subjects. Prominent in several fields, he was erudite, a man of letters, a distinguished musician and theologian, ascetic, as well as the author of many sermons, letters, and treatises on the spiritual life.

These works, few of which have ever been printed, are scattered about in different libraries – at Basel, Brussels, St. Gallen and elsewhere. The first one published, the Exercitatorium Monachale or Tractatus utilis proficere volentibus, enjoyed a strange career. Inserted in a number of manuscripts of The Imitation of Christ between the first and third books, it has sometimes passed as an unedited book of that work, and was published as such by Dr. Liebner at Göttingen in 1842. Several times reprinted, notably by J. B. Malou in his 1858 Recherches historiques et critiques sur le véritable auteur de l'Imitation, it has been translated into French (Waille, Paris, 1844) under the title L'Imitation de J. C., livre inédit trouvé dans la bibliothèque de Quedlinbourg. It has in great part passed into the Mystica theologia (chap. I) of Henry de Beaume, and into the treatise De Contemplatione (lib. I, art. xxi) of Denis the Carthusian, and, after having inspired Thomas à Kempis and Garcias de Cisneros, it furnished Saint Ignatius himself with some ideas for his Exercises.
