= Vogelsang Charterhouse =

Carthusian monastery in Germany

Coordinates: 50°54′48″N 6°22′38″E

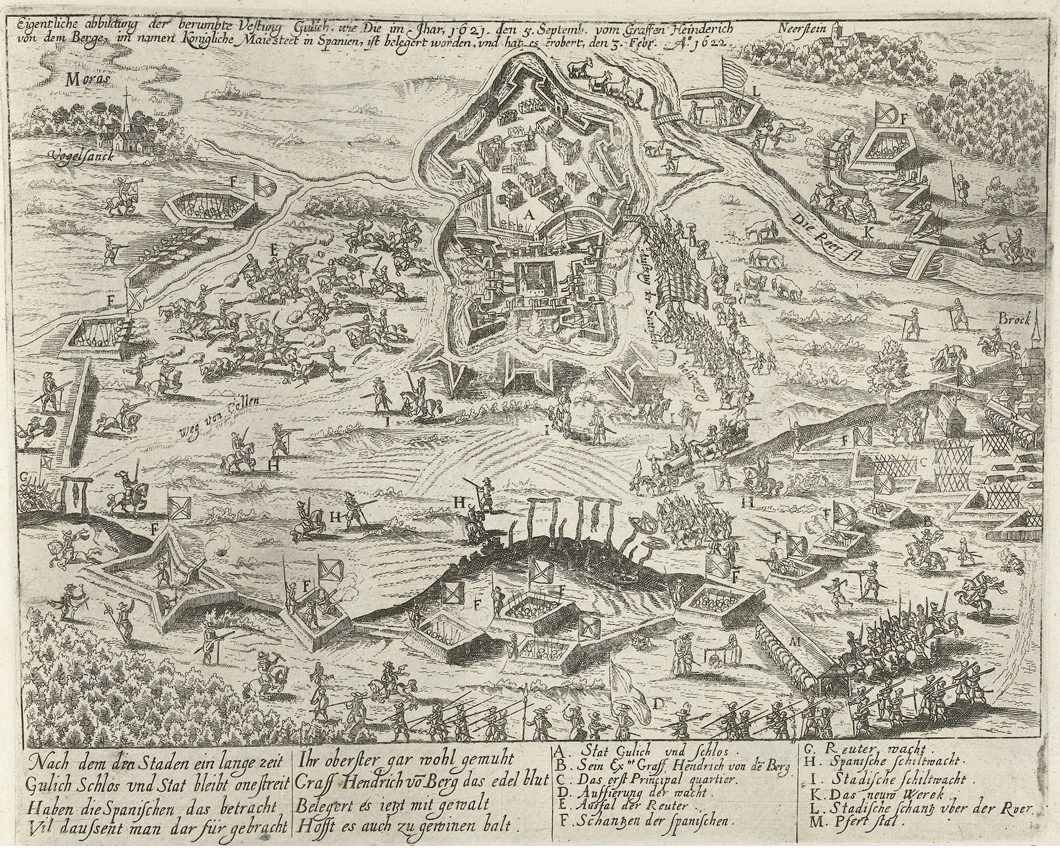
Vogelsang (top left) in a picture of the siege of Jülich in 1621–1622

Vogelsang Charterhouse (German: Kartause zum Vogelsang bei Jülich; Latin: Domus compassionis Beatae Mariae in Cantavio prope Iuliacum) was a Carthusian monastery or charterhouse near Jülich in the present North Rhine-Westphalia, Germany, founded in 1478 and secularised during the mediatisation of Germany in 1802.

== History ==
At the instigation of the chancellor of the Duchy of Jülich, Hermann von Brakel, the community of Roermond Charterhouse in the Duchy of Guelders were invited to set up a daughter house near the former ducal property of Vogelsang, about 1600 metres to the south of the town of Jülich. In accordance with the Carthusian tradition of Marian devotion, the new foundation was dedicated to the compassion of Mary (German: Mitleiden Mariens unter dem Kreuz; Latin: compassio Beatae Mariae).

For the foundation Duke William IV of Jülich and Berg and his first wife Elisabeth gave their property zum Vogelsang to the Carthusian Order. Further endowments followed. The construction of the new monastery, for the usual Carthusian community of 12 monks, lasted almost 50 years, ending with the completion of the monastic church in 1527.

During the Reformation the prior was Johannes Justus of Landsberg from Cologne Charterhouse, who led on the necessity of a thorough spiritual renewal without going over to Lutheran teachings. Through his many publications he became a significant figure in the Counter-Reformation.

Although the monastery was not economically as secure as was desirable, it did manage to attract further endowments and enjoyed the favour of the rulers.

During the War of the Jülich Succession (1609/10) the monastery, lying unprotected as it did on open ground in front of the fortified town of Jülich, was in constant danger. In 1609 and 1610 cattle, equipment and the church treasures were sent elsewhere for safety, and some of the monks and lay brothers sought refuge in other charterhouses, but the monastery itself suffered such plundering and destruction that for a time it seemed impossible that it could ever be made habitable again.

In the Thirty Years' War however it suffered little damage but on the contrary moved slowly from considerable poverty back to stable economic circumstances.

In the second half of the 17th century under the priors Theodor Monheim and Antonius Basel the monastery enjoyed a golden age of prosperity, to which properly-managed forestry contributed, and was able to acquire gold and silver liturgical vessels and to invest capital at interest. Starting in 1696 the buildings were refurbished and the church decorated in the Baroque manner.

== Dissolution and after ==
In 1794, when the territories on the left bank of the Lower Rhine were conquered by French revolutionary troops and incorporated into the Département de la Roer, some of the monks had to flee. Although some were able to return in the following years, continuing the strict discipline of the Carthusians was made increasingly difficult by a series of compulsory legal measures and eventually became impossible. Nevertheless, even though it was legally forbidden, the monastery secretly accepted one more novice, who later took the final vows.

In August 1802 the charterhouse was finally closed down and the former monks were forbidden to wear the habit of their order. Half of them returned to their homes. As far as can be ascertained, all the former monks made themselves available for pastoral duties. The last prior, Carl Unkraut (1731–1823), who had come to Vogelsang in 1778 from Hildesheim Charterhouse, which had been dissolved in the previous year, and became prior in 1796, went to the parish of St. Mariä Himmelfahrt in Cologne where he died in 1823.

The lands and buildings of the charterhouse were sold and mostly demolished. After further destruction during World War II the few remains of the site are in private ownership.

== Sources ==
- Harald Goder: Die Kartause zum Vogelsang bei Jülich, Band 1, Bau und Ausstattung, Archiv und Bibliothek, historische Übersicht, Salzburg 2000, ISBN 3901995250
- Harald Goder: Die Kartause zum Vogelsang bei Jülich, Band 2, Verfassung , Salzburg 2013, ISBN 9783902895073
- Harald Goder: Vogelsang/Jülich, in: Monasticon Cartusiense, ed. Gerhard Schlegel, James Hogg, Band 2, Salzburg 2004, pp. 646–653
