= Roermond Charterhouse =

Monastery in Limburg, Netherlands

Coordinates: 51°11′48″N 5°59′23″E

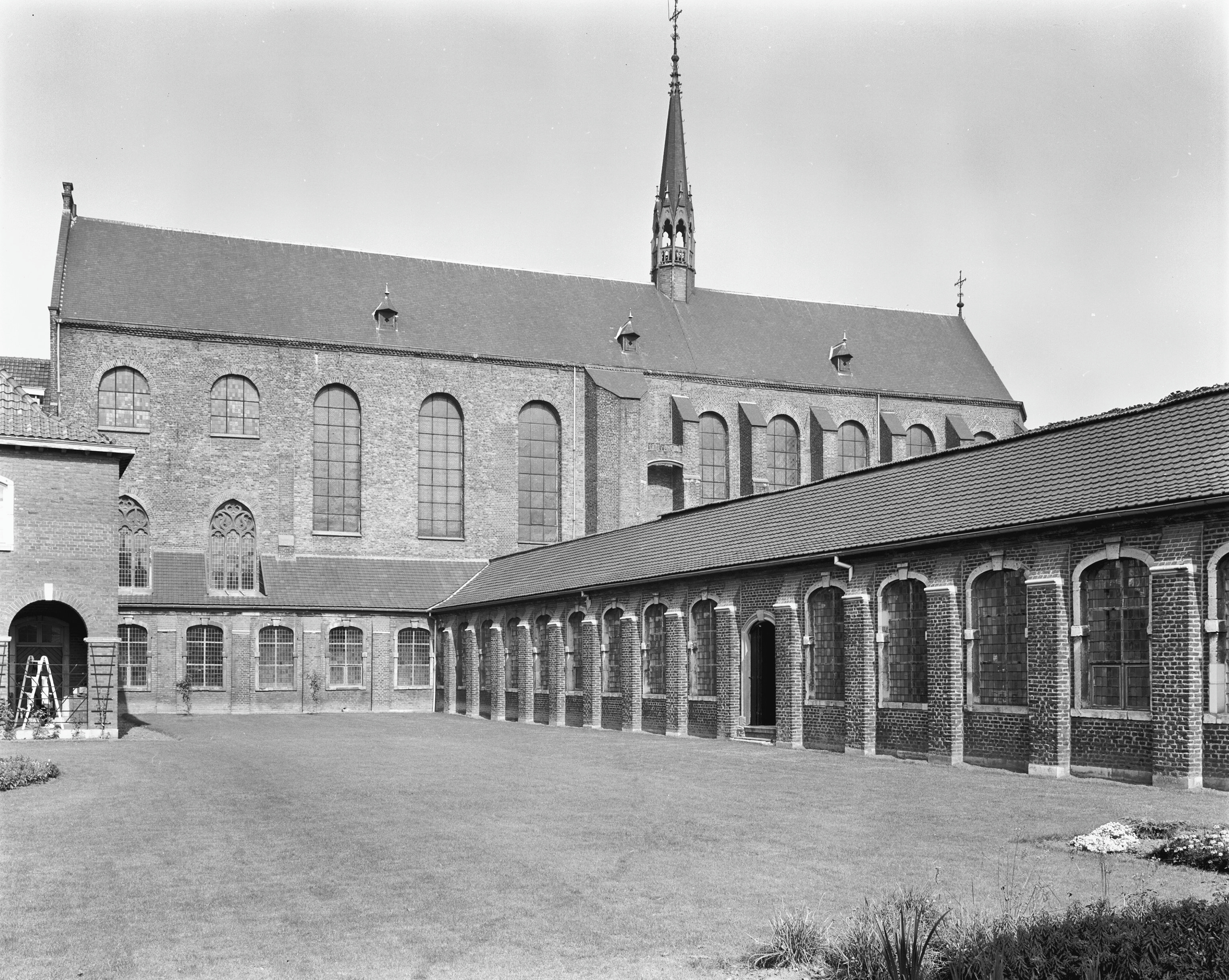
Buildings of Roermond Charterhouse: cloisters with St Charles' Chapel

Roermond Charterhouse, otherwise Bethlehem Charterhouse (Dutch: Kartuizerklooster Bethlehem, Kartuizerklooster Onze Lieve Vrouwe van Bethlehem), was a Carthusian monastery or charterhouse in Roermond in the province of Limburg in the south Netherlands. It was founded in 1376 by Werner van Swalmen, a canon at Maastricht, after he had returned from a pilgrimage to the Holy Land, and settled by 12 monks from Cologne Charterhouse. One of the first priors was the prominent scholar Henry of Kalkar. The important and prolific 15th-century theologian Denis the Carthusian (1402–1471) was a monk here.

In the 15th century the charterhouse was able to undertake the settlement of two new monasteries, Vught Charterhouse (1466) and Vogelsang Charterhouse (1478).

The monastery was destroyed by fire in 1554 and pillaged by the army of William the Silent, Prince of Orange, in 1572, when half the monks were killed, subsequently known as the Martyrs of Roermond. The monastery was re-founded in 1576 but suffered another serious fire in 1665.

The monastery enjoyed prosperity in the 18th century but was suppressed under the Josephine Reforms in 1783.

In 1841 the buildings were taken over for the seminary of the Diocese of Roermond, which occupied them until 1961. They are now used as the diocesan offices. The mediaeval monastic chapel, re-dedicated to Saint Charles Borromeo in 1841, continues in use as a church.

== Sources ==
- Het geheim van de stilte. De besloten wereld van de Roermondse kartuizers. Krijn Pansters (ed.), Uitg. Waanders, Zwolle, 2009. ISBN 9789040084881
- The Carthusians in the Low Countries. Studies in Monastic History and Heritage. Krijn Pansters (ed.), Peeters, Leuven, 2014 ISBN 9789042931800
- Archeologische Opgraving Bethlehemstraat - Voogdijstraat, Roermond. J.E.M. Wattenberghe, Heinenoord, 2011 ISBN 9789461920201
