= Doctor Ecstaticus =

Doctor Ecstaticus may refer to:

- Denis the Carthusian (1402 – 1471), Roman Catholic theologian and mystic
- Meister Eckhart (c. 1260–c. 1328), German theologian, philosopher and mystic
- John of Ruusbroec (1293–1381), Flemish mystical theologian
