= Martyrs of Roermond =

Dutch Catholic clerics killed in 1572

The Martyrs of Roermond
- The Martyrs of Roermond, 1587, copper engraving in: Richard Verstegen, Theatrum Crudelitatum Haereticorum Nostri Temporis, Antwerp, A. Huberti, 1587, p. 61
- Born: 16th century
- Died: 23 July 1572, Roermond, County of Holland, Spanish Netherlands
- Martyred by: The Geuzen
- Venerated in: Catholic Church (Netherlands and the Carthusians)
- Notable martyrs: Stefanus van Roermond; Albertus van Winsen; Johannes van Sittard; Erasmus van Maastricht; Matthias van Keulen; Henricus Wellen; Johannes van Luik; Johannes Leeuwis; Johannes Gressenich; Severus van Koblenz; Paulus van Waelwijck; Wilhelmus Wellen; Vincentius van Herck

The Martyrs of Roermond (Dutch: Martelaren van Roermond) were a group of 13 Dutch Catholic clerics, secular and religious, who were murdered on 23 July 1572 in the town of Roermond by militant Dutch Calvinists during the 16th-century religious wars—specifically, the Dutch Revolt against Spanish rule, which developed into the Eighty Years' War.

== Events ==
On April 1, 1572 a group of Dutch rebels led by William van der Marck, Lord of Lumey, and by two of his captains, Willem Bloys van Treslong and Lenaert Jansz de Graeff managed to take the harbor city of Brielle – a turning point in the Dutch war against the Spanish Empire. Prince William the Silent, the main leader of the Dutch revolt against King Philip II of Spain, was in exile in Germany when he heard of the success of Dutch rebels in the Netherlands – not only did they manage to take Brielle, other cities in the Western part of the Netherlands quickly fell to the Dutch rebels. To support the revolt, William of Orange launched an invasion of the Spanish Netherlands from 3 sides: 2 armies would attack the Spanish Netherlands from Germany and 1 would invade from the South. The army led by William of Orange attacked the Southern part of the Netherlands, now the provinces of North Brabant, Limburg and Flanders. One of the first cities to be attacked was the Spanish held city of Roermond. An army of 24,000 men attacked Roermond and managed to take it after 5 assaults on 23 July 1572. After the capture of the city the troops of William the Silent stormed Roermond and massacred many priests and clerics, including the secretary of Bishop Lindanus. The Roermond Charterhouse was assaulted by Protestants. Of the 24 Carthusians 13 were murdered and two died in the days that followed.

== The 13 martyrs ==
- Stefanus van Roermond
- Albertus van Winsen
- Johannes van Sittard
- Erasmus van Maastricht
- Matthias van Keulen
- Henricus Wellen
- Johannes van Luik
- Johannes Leeuwis
- Johannes Gressenich
- Severus van Koblenz
- Paulus van Waelwijck
- Wilhelmus Wellen
- Vincentius van Herck

== Legacy ==
Numerous works of art were created to commemorate the events in Roermond. The Italian painter Vincenzo Carducci made three paintings about the Roermond Martyrs in 1632:

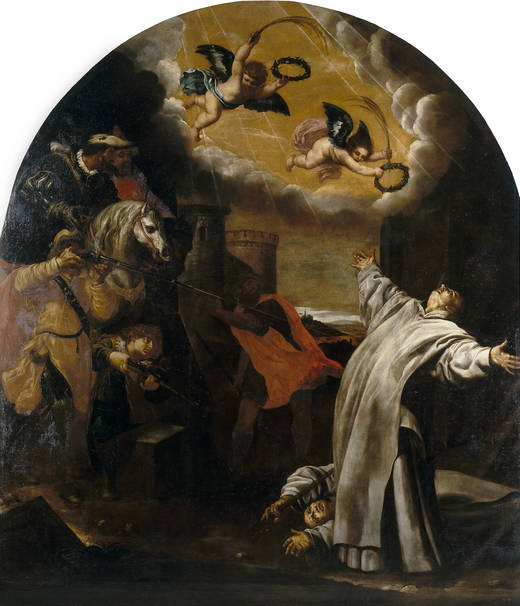
Carducho (El martirio de Roermond de Vinzenz Herck y Jan van Loewen.)

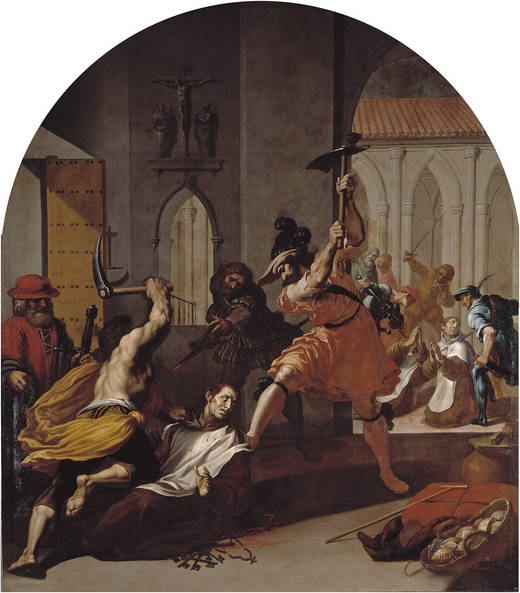
Carducho (El martirio de los cartujos de Roermond)

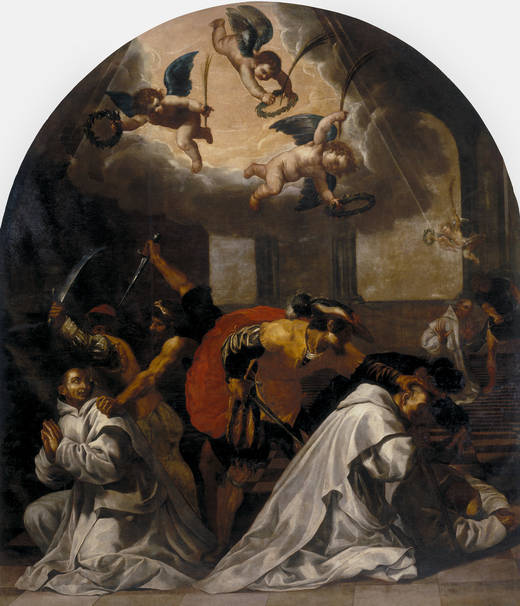
Carducho (El martirio de los cartujos de Roermond)

== See also ==
- Martyrs of Alkmaar
- Martyrs of Gorkum

== Bibliography ==
On the martyrs of Roermond, see Hesse, “De martelaren van Roermond,” Limburg's Jaarboek (1911), 170–209, 264–290.
