= Hildesheim Charterhouse =

Charterhouse in Hildesheim, Germany

Coordinates: 52°08′49″N 09°56′54″E

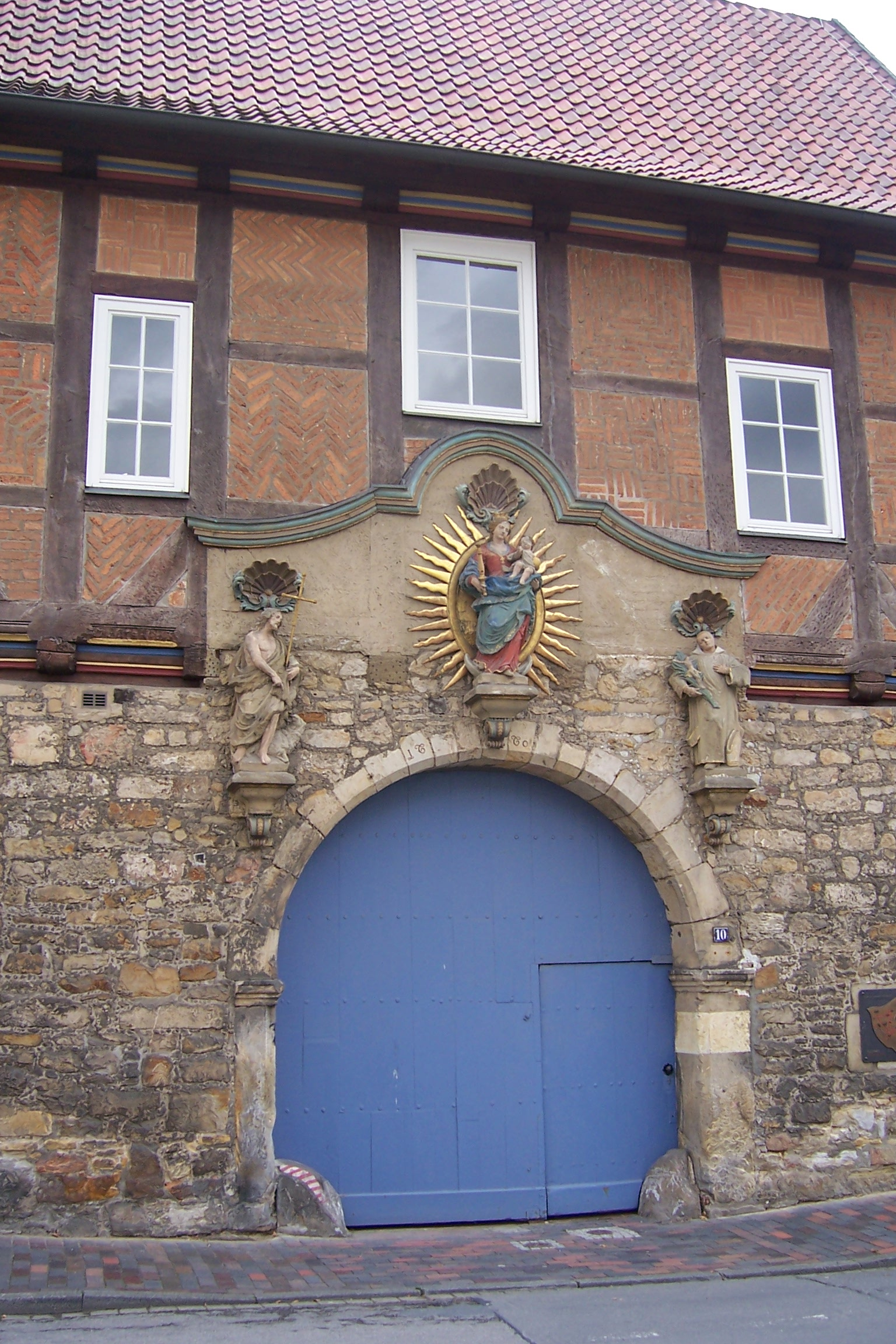
Baroque gateway of the charterhouse

Hildesheim Charterhouse (German: Kartause Hildesheim, Kartause Marienkloster; Latin: Domus Claustri Beatae Mariae) is a former Carthusian monastery or charterhouse in Hildesheim in Lower Saxony, Germany.

== History ==
The charterhouse was founded by Gerhard vom Berge (or von Berg), bishop of Hildesheim from 1365 to 1398, in thanks for his victory over Magnus I, Duke of Brunswick-Lüneburg, in the battle of Dinklar. The deed of foundation was executed on 2 May 1388. The first monks were from Erfurt Charterhouse. The monastery premises were built to begin with outside the town of Hildesheim, in front of the Dammtor (a gate to the new suburb of Dammstadt) to the west of the town, on land belonging to the von Rössing family where the Bennoburg fortress had previously stood. The charterhouse did not become the full owner of the ground on which it stood until 1448.

On 20 June 1522 inhabitants of Hildesheim set fire to the monastery during the Hildesheim Diocesan Feud. In 1542 the town council introduced the Protestant Reformation and after repeated looting of the charterhouse in 1542 and 1542 the monks, under their prior Dietrich Loher (c.1495–1554), withdrew to Cologne. When in 1543 Loher was appointed prior of Buxheim Charterhouse near Memmingen in Upper Swabia, several of the Hildesheim monks accompanied him.

On 30 July 1545 the monastery was plundered yet again. The documents and the contents of the treasury were taken over by the town council. Parts of the buildings were used for town defence. Only in 1613 were the Carthusians able to reoccupy the premises. On 23 July 1626, during the Thirty Years' War, Danish troops and inhabitants of Hildesheim destroyed the monastery. The ruins were completely demolished in 1632.

Hildesheim about 1750

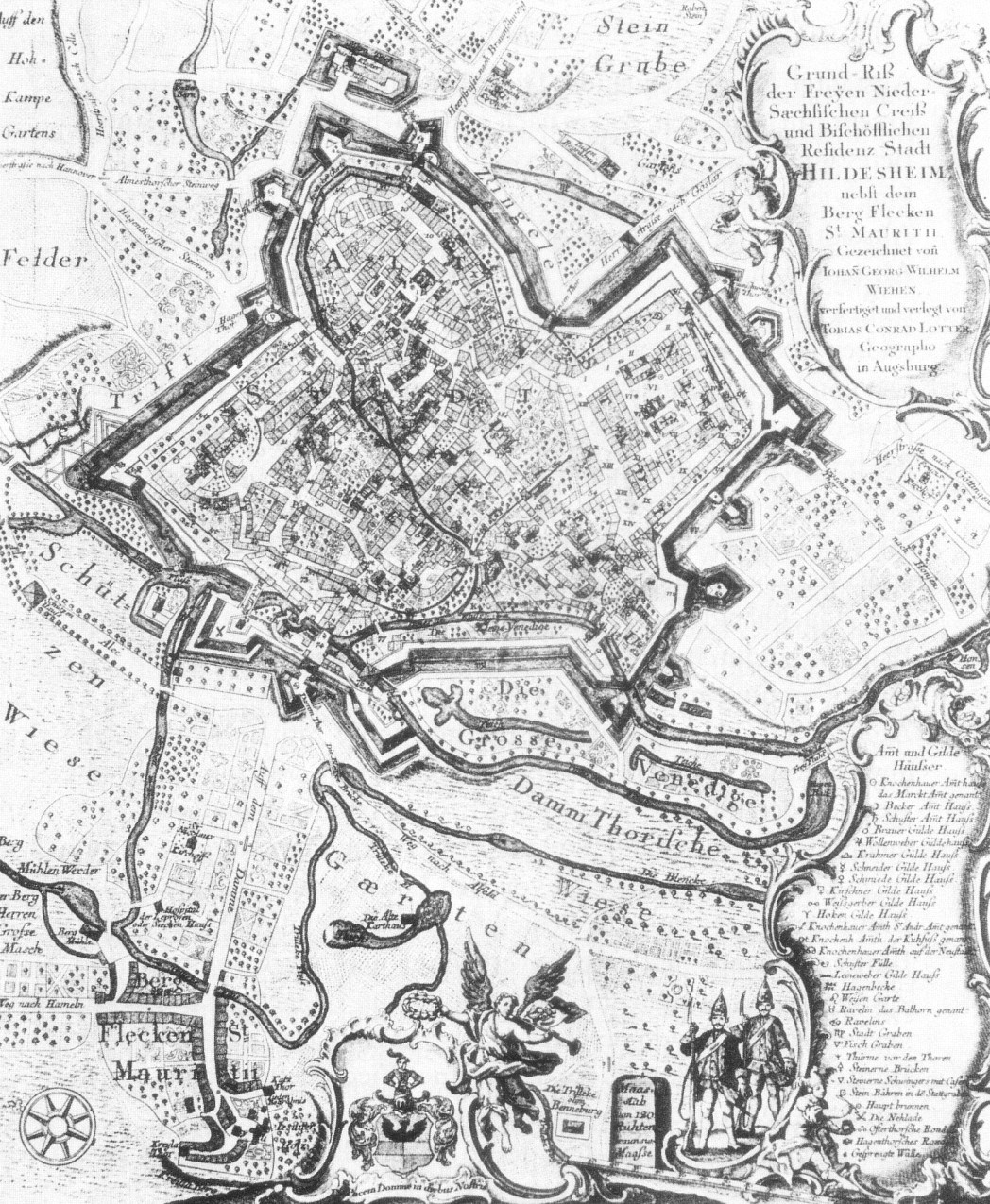
The old charterhouse (1388–1632)

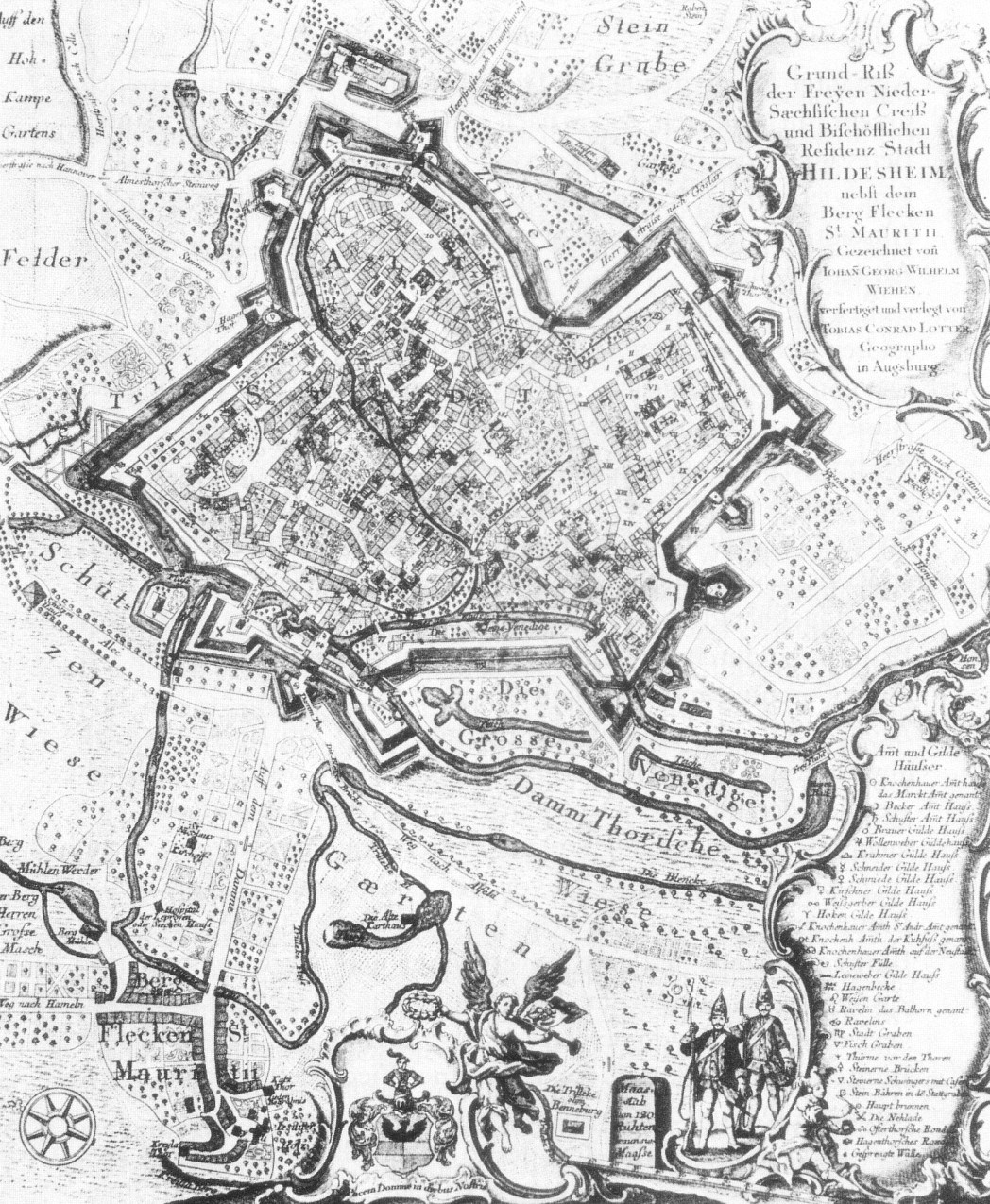
The new charterhouse (1659–1777)

Under Prince-Bishop Maximilian Henry of Bavaria the monastery was re-established inside the town walls in 1659–1660 for its better protection, between the cathedral close and the Langelinienwall.

In 1708 Bernhard Aly, an assimilated Ottoman prisoner of war (German: Beutetürke), entered the monastery. Aly, who at his baptism took the surname "Weissenburg" after the German name of his home town, Belgrade, was still evidenced in the monastery in 1758 under his Carthusian name Pater Josephus.

In 1777 the monastery was dissolved, after the Prince-Bishop of Hildesheim Friedrich Wilhelm von Westphalen, in agreement with Pope Pius VI and Emperor Joseph II, assigned its assets and estate to the improvement of the income of the Hildesheim seminary. The monks were transferred to various other monasteries. The last prior, Carl Unkraut (1731–1823), moved to Vogelsang Charterhouse near Jülich, where he became prior in 1796 and remained until its suppression in 1802.

Part of the monastery library was acquired by Hildesheim Cathedral library. The buildings were used firstly as a seminary and later as a poorhouse and charity school. On 11 June 1852 the bishop of Hildesheim, Eduard Jakob Wedekin, opened in the "Karthaus", as the south wing of the secularised charterhouse was called, the St. Bernward Hospital (St. Bernward Krankenhaus), which still exists.

== Buildings ==
The last visible structural trace of the charterhouse is the Baroque gateway in the Neue Straße, now part of the St. Bernward Hospital, with figures of the Madonna in glory, Saint John the Baptist and Saint Bruno of Cologne, the founder of the Carthusian Order, standing on pedestals above it.
