= Master of the Legend of Saint Bruno =

German 15th-century painter

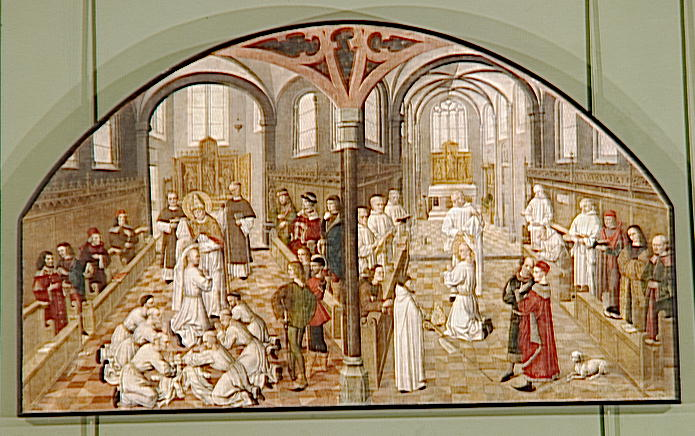
Master of the Legend of Saint Bruno: Saint Bruno and Saint Hugh Take the Habit

The Master of the Legend of Saint Bruno is the "notname" of an anonymous Gothic painter who was active in Cologne in the late 15th century. He is best known for the cycle of paintings on canvas produced for Cologne Charterhouse after which he is named.

== Name ==
The anonymous artist is conventionally named after the cycle of paintings, created in around 1486, which depicts scenes from the life and legend of Saint Bruno the Carthusian, also known as Bruno of Cologne, founder of the Carthusian Order. Initially attributed to various different painters, the cycle was at last recognised as the work of a specific artistic personality by Rolf Wallrath, who came up with the "notname".

== Style ==
The Master of the Legend of Saint Bruno is one of the painters of the Cologne School, influenced by the Master of the Life of the Virgin. His style suggests an apprenticeship in the circle around the latter, active in Cologne from 1460 to 1490. It has been hypothesised that he may have spent some time in Bruges and Ghent during his training, based on a detectable Dutch and Flemish influence already present in the work of the Master of the Life of the Virgin.

== Cycle of the Legend of Saint Bruno ==
The cycle of paintings was installed in 1489 in the small cloister ("Kleine Galilea") of Cologne Charterhouse, one of the most important Carthusian monasteries. The complete cycle probably comprised 11 paintings representing scenes from the life and legend of Saint Bruno, the founder of the order in the 11th century. It was also a means of presenting the order itself, its objectives and importance. At the time when the cycle was painted, Bruno had not yet been canonised.

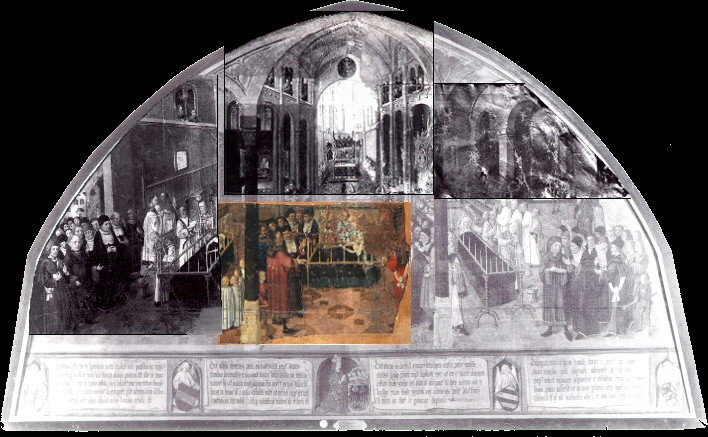
Miracle of the Talking Corpse. The coloured section has survived, and been added to an old photograph of the complete work. The strip at the bottom contains the figure of the donor in the centre panel.

=== Composition ===
The paintings are very large, up to three metres across, and partly adapted to fit the lunettes of the vault of the small cloister where they were hung. Their initial dimensions were variable, and the surviving fragments have been further re-cut. Each painting depicted between one and three scenes, separated by columns.

Of the original cycle of 11 pictures, the following survive, either whole or as fragments:

- The Miracle of the Talking Corpse and The Conversion of Bruno. Four fragments, Wallraf-Richartz Museum, Cologne, WRM 0155 A-D
- Oath of Fidelity by Bruno's Companions and Visit to the Hermit. Two fragments, Hessisches Landesmuseum Darmstadt, GK 28A and GK 28B
- Saint Bruno and Saint Hugo Take the Habit. Musée du Louvre, Paris, M.N.R.972
- Confirmation of the Carthusian Order by the Pope and two other fragments. Formerly in the Virnich collection, Bonn; now lost
- The Miracle of the Partridges. Formerly in the Schlesisches Museum für Kunstgewerbe und Altertümer, Breslau (Wrocław); now lost

=== Donors ===
Each panel of the cycle was the gift of an important dignitary, and bears the name and arms of its donor, represented kneeling at prayer. Besides the Emperor Frederick III and his son Maximilian, at that time King of the Romans, there are also Philip the Handsome, duke of Burgundy and son of Maximilian; Charles VIII, king of France; Casimir IV Jagiellon, king of Poland; the Archbishop of Cologne; the Archbishop of Trier; the Elector Palatine; the Elector of Saxony; the Duke of Jülich; and the Duke of Cleves.

The list of donors demonstrates the importance of the monastery. The cycle was probably completed around the time of the coronation ceremonies of Maximilian as King of the Romans in 1486, and it has been speculated that the reason for the choice of canvas as a support was for ease of moving and displaying the paintings in different locations. Also, this cycle constitutes the first set of paintings of such monumental dimensions produced in Cologne. It is plausible that this work inspired other cycles of saints' lives in Cologne, particularly that created by the Master of the Legend of Saint Ursula.

== Other works ==
Nicole Reynaud attributes to the same Master the following works:

- a triptych Mass of Saint Gregory at Bamberg;
- two wings with Saint Catherine and Saint Barbara on one and Saint Martin and Saint Anthony on the other, at Darmstadt;
- an Annunciation painted on the reverse of the wings added in about 1490, to the Deposition by the Master of the Life of the Virgin, in the Wallraf-Richartz Museum, Cologne (WRM 137–138).
