= Martyrs of Alkmaar =

Dutch Catholic clerics killed in 1572

The Martyrs of Alkmaar
- Anonymous print of the Alkmaar Martyrs, contained in Petrus Opmeer, 'Martelaars-boek ofte historie der Hollandsche Martelaren' II, Antwerp (1700), Pl. 19
- Born: 16th century
- Died: 24 June 1572, Alkmaar, County of Holland, Spanish Netherlands
- Martyred by: The Geuzen
- Means of martyrdom: Hanging
- Venerated in: Catholic Church (Netherlands)
- Notable martyrs: Daniël van Arendonk; Hadrianus van Gouda; Cornelis van Diest; Johannes van Naarden; Lodewijk Voets

The Martyrs of Alkmaar (Dutch: Martelaren van Alkmaar) were a group of 5 Dutch Catholic clerics, secular and religious from Alkmaar, who were hanged on 24 June 1572 in the town of Enkhuizen by militant Dutch Calvinists during the 16th-century religious wars—specifically, the Dutch Revolt against Spanish rule, which developed into the Eighty Years' War. These atrocities were inflicted by the Calvinist leader, Diederik Sonoy.

== The 5 martyrs ==
1. Daniël van Arendonk
2. Hadrianus van Gouda
3. Cornelis van Diest
4. Johannes van Naarden
5. Lodewijk Voets (also known by his Latin name Ludovicus Boethuis)

Engelbert Terburg, a lay brother of the Franciscan monastery outside Alkmaar, was transferred by Sonoy to the village of Ransdorp, near Amsterdam, where he was hanged on 11 August 1572 after being subjected to torture.

== See also ==
- Martyrs of Gorkum
- Martyrs of Roermond

== Bibliography ==
- Willibrord Lampen, “De martyribus Alcmariensibus P. Daniele ab Arendonck et sociis O.F.M.,” Archivum Franciscanum Historicum, 16 (1923), 453–468; and 17 (1924), 13–29, 169–182;
- W. Nolet, “De historische waarheid aangaande de Alkmaarsche martelaren,” Studia Catholica, 5 (1928–1929), 171–199;
- Willibrord Lampen, “De dienaar Gods P. Daniel van Arendonk O. F. M., martelaar van Alkmaar”. Brabantia, 4 (1955), 65–72.
