= Anton Woensam =

German painter and engraver

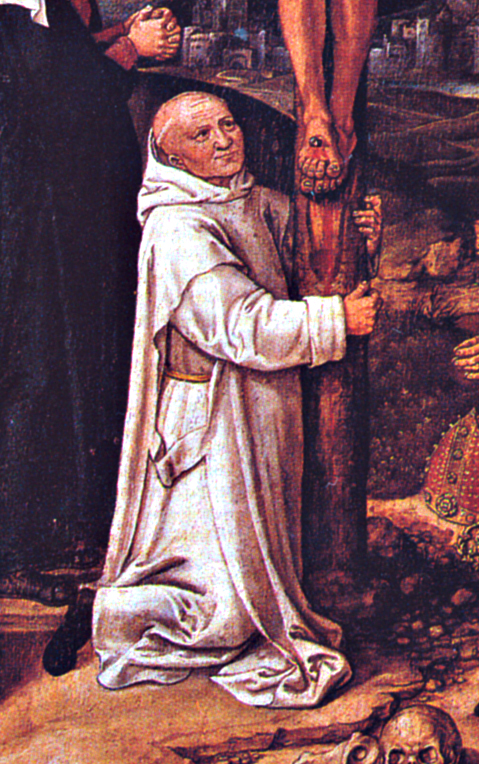
Peter Blommeveen by Woensam, 1535

Anton Woensam (c.1493/1496 – c.1541) was a German painter and wood-engraver.

Woensam was "probably" trained by his father Jaspar as a painter. He mainly created book illustrations.

He relocated from Worms to Cologne in about 1510.

His work is in the permanent collection of the National Gallery of Art, Washington DC, US.
