= Denis the Carthusian =

Catholic theologian (1402–1471)

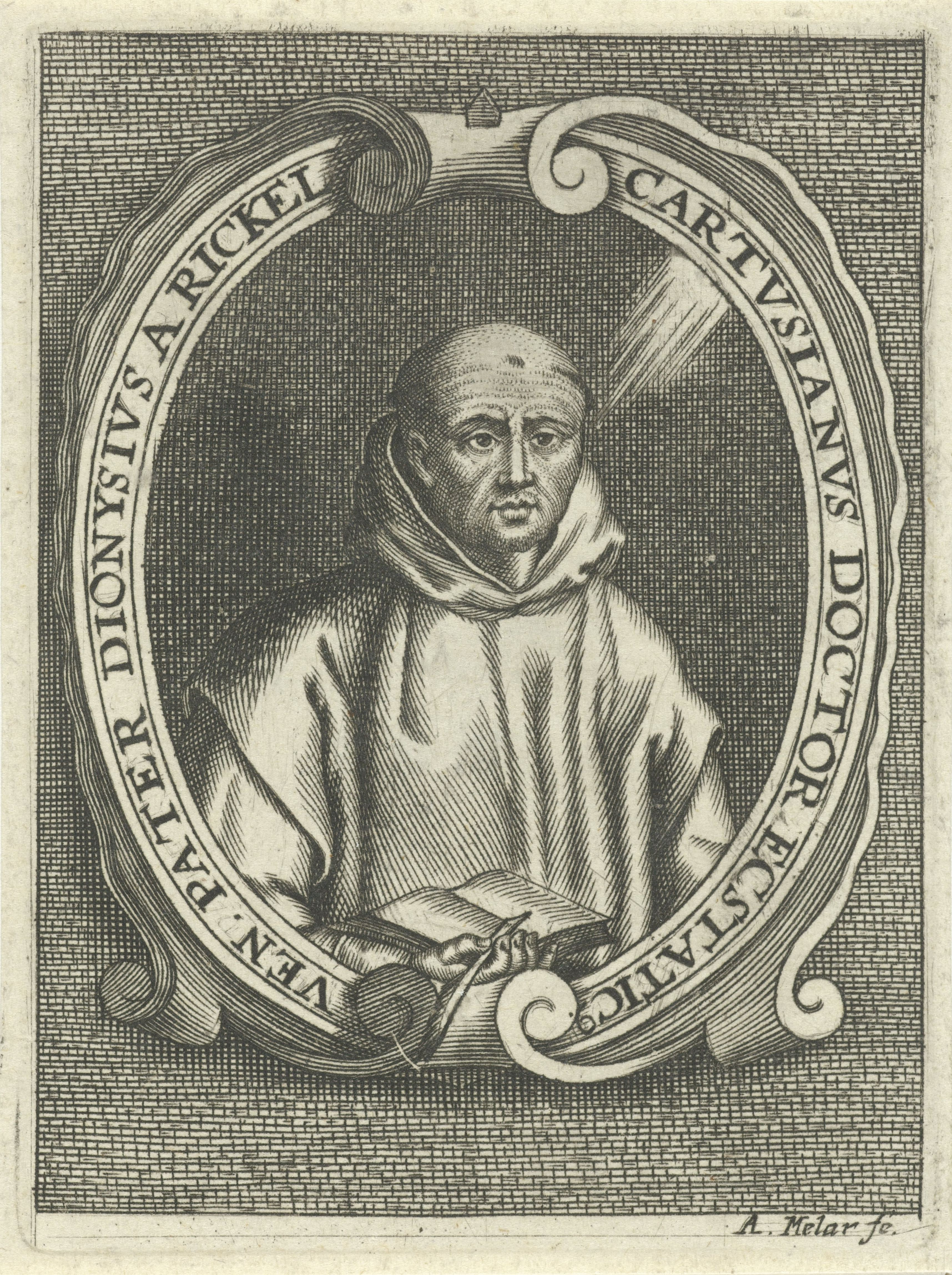
Portrait of Denis the Carthusian by Adriaen Millaert

Denis the Carthusian (A.D. 1402–1471), also known as Denys van Leeuwen, Denis Ryckel, Dionysius van Rijkel, Dionysius Carthusianus, Denys le Chartreux (or other combinations of these terms), was a Roman Catholic theologian and mystic.

== Life ==
Denis was born in 1402 in that part of the present-day Belgian Province of Limburg which was formerly comprised in the County of Hesbaye. His birthplace was Rijkel, a small village a few miles from Sint-Truiden, whence ancient writers have often surnamed him "Ryckel" or "à Ryckel". He first attended school at Sint-Truiden. In 1415, he went to another school at Zwolle (Overijssel), which was then of great repute and attracted many students from various parts of Germany. He there entered upon the study of philosophy and became acquainted with the principles and practice of religious life, which the rector, John Cele, himself taught. Shortly after the rector's death (1417), Denis returned home. By the age of 18, he had decided to become a monk. He applied to the Carthusian monastery at Roermond only to be told he could not be admitted until he reached the minimum age of 20. The Prior at Roermond urged him to enter the University of Cologne to study philosophy and theology for the next two years. Having earned his Master of Arts degree, he entered the Carthusian monastery at Roermond (Dutch Limburg) in 1424.

Believing that the most perfect life was a blend of contemplation and action, he divided his day into two, devoting the first part to prayer and the second to study and writing, and this remained his pattern for almost 50 years. He is said to have devoted eight hours a day to reciting prayer and receiving mass, while only allotting three hours each night for sleep.

Denis only twice left Roermond for a significant amount of time. For seven months in 1451, Denis accompanied Cardinal Nicholas of Cusa in an attempt to reform the Church in Germany and to preach a crusade against the Turks. In July 1466, he was appointed to superintend the building of a monastery at Hertogenbosch. A three-year struggle against the difficulties of the new foundation broke down his health, already impaired by work and privations, and he was obliged to return to Roermond in 1469.

Posterity has surnamed him Doctor ecstaticus. Fundamental to Denis the Carthusian's teachings is his theory on contemplation. He proposes a division of life and wisdom into three parts: I. In the purgative stage, the Christian is occupied with overcoming sin and growing in virtue. This stage is associated with what he calls natural wisdom, naturally acquired. II. In the illuminative stage, the Christian's mind is occupied with the contemplation of divine things. The illuminative stage concerns what Denis calls supernatural wisdom, naturally acquired, also known as scholastic theology. III. In the Unitive stage, he experiences a vehement love from his contemplation of the divine. This type of experience can only come from supernatural wisdom, supernaturally bestowed. Denis the Carthusian was said to have reached the Unitive stage, being privileged to divine ecstatic experiences lasting hours at a time. While still a novice he had ecstasies which lasted two or three hours, and later on they lasted sometimes seven hours and more. During his ecstasies, many things were revealed to him which he made known only when it could profit others, and the same may be said of what he learnt from the souls in purgatory, who appeared to him very frequently. In physical austerities, he was assisted by a strong constitution, for he was a man of athletic build and had, as he said, "an iron head and a brazen stomach".

During the last two years of his life, he suffered intensely from paralysis, the stone, and other infirmities. He had been a monk for forty-eight years when he died at the age of sixty-nine.

Upon his remains being disinterred one hundred and thirty-seven years after, day for day (12 March 1608), his skull was said to have emitted a sweet perfume and the fingers he had most used in writing, i.e. the thumb and forefinger of the right hand, were apparently found in a perfect state of preservation. Although the cause of his beatification has never yet been introduced in accordance with the Carthusian tradition of not seeking such recognition, St. Francis de Sales, St. Alphonsus Liguori, and other writers style him "Blessed"; his life is in the Acta Sanctorum of the Bollandists (12 March), and his name is to be found in many martyrologies.

== Works ==
The main contribution of Denis the Carthusian was to synthesise all previous doctrine on the spiritual life and then to make an evaluation of the various conclusions. He wrote over 150 works, now presented as 43 volumes, which include commentaries on the entire Bible and over 900 sermons. He began by commenting on the Psalms in 1434 and then went on to comment on the whole of the Old and the New Testament. After seeing one of his commentaries Pope Eugene IV exclaimed: "Let Mother Church rejoice to have such a son!"

He also commented on the works of Boethius, Peter Lombard, John Climacus, as well as those of, or attributed to, Pseudo-Dionysius the Areopagite. He also translated Cassian into easier Latin. He wrote theological treatises, such as his "Summa Fidei Orthodoxæ"; "Compendium Theologicum", "De Lumine Christianæ Theoriæ", "De Laudibus B. V. Mariæ", and "De Præconio B. V. Mariæ" (in both of which treatises he upholds the doctrine of the Immaculate Conception), "De quatuor Novissimis", etc.; philosophical treatises, such as his "Compendium philosophicum", "De venustate mundi et pulchritudine Dei" (a most remarkable æsthetic dissertation), "De ente et essentia", etc.; a great many treatises relating to morals, asceticism, church discipline, liturgy, etc.; sermons and homilies for all the Sundays and festivals of the year, etc.

As a theologian and a philosopher, he belongs to no particular school. Although an admirer of Aristotle and Thomas Aquinas, he is neither an Aristotelian nor a Thomist in the usual sense of the words, but seems inclined rather to the Christian Platonism of Pseudo-Dionysius the Areopagite, St. Augustine, and St. Bonaventure. As a mystical writer he is akin to Hugh and Richard of St. Victor, St. Bonaventure, and the writers of the Windesheim School, and in his treatises may be found summed up the doctrine of the Fathers of the Church, especially of Pseudo-Dionysius the Areopagite, and of Meister Eckhart, Henry Suso, John van Ruysbroeck, and other writers of the German and Flemish Schools.

He has been called the last of the Schoolmen, in that he is supposedly the last important Scholastic writer. His works may be considered to form a vast encyclopedia, a complete summary of the Scholastic teaching of the Middle Ages; this is their primary characteristic and their chief merit.

He was consulted as an oracle by men of different social standing, from bishops and princes downwards; they flocked to his cell, and letters came to him from all parts of the Netherlands and Germany. The topic of such correspondence was often the grievous state of the Church in Europe, i.e. the evils ensuing from relaxed morals and discipline and from the invasion of Islam. Soon after the Fall of Constantinople (1453), impressed by revelations God made to him concerning the terrific woes threatening Christendom, he wrote a letter to all the princes of Europe, urging them to amend their lives, to cease their dissensions, and to join in war against their common enemy, the Turks. A general council, being in his eyes the only means of procuring serious reform, he exhorted all prelates and others to unite their efforts to bring it about.

He also wrote a series of treatises, laying down rules of Christian living for churchmen and for laymen of every rank and profession. "De doctrina et regulis vitæ Christianæ", the most important of these treatises, was written at the request, and for the use, of the Franciscan preacher John Brugman. These and others, which he wrote of a similar import, inveighing against the vices and abuses of the time, insisting on the need of a general reform, and showing how it was to be effected, give an insight into the customs, the state of society, and ecclesiastical life of that period.

His treatise De Meditatione was the last that he wrote, in 1469.

== Later editions ==
=== Latin editions ===
- Commentary on Petrus Lombardus, 4 vols., Cologne 1534, Venice 1584
- Commentary on Dionysius Areopagite, Cologne 1536, 1556
- Opera omnia, ed. M. Leone, 42 vols., Montreuil-sur-mer, Tournai, Parkminster 1896–1935.
- Kent Emery Jr, ed, Dionysii Carthusiensis Opera Selecta: Prolegomena, CCCM 121-121a, (Turnhout: Belgium, Brepols, 1991) [The critical edition to follow this two-volume preliminary work has yet to appear]

=== English translations ===
- The Spiritual Writings of Denis the Carthusian: contemplation, meditation, prayer, the fountain of light and the paths of life, monastic profession, exhortation to novices, translated by Íde Ní Riain, with an introduction by Terence O'Reilly, (Dublin, Ireland; Portland, OR: Four Courts, 2005)
- Commentary on the Psalms (in six volumes), translated by Andrew M. Greenwell, (Waterloo, ON: Arouca Press, 2020–2023), remaining volumes forthcoming
1. Beatus Vir (Psalms 1–25)
2. Dominus Illuminatio Mea (Psalms 26–50)
3. Quid Gloriaris in Militia (Psalms 51–75)
4. Voce Mea (Psalms 76–100)
5. Domine Exaudi Orationem Meam (Psalms 100-125)
6. Nisi Dominus (Psalms 126–150)
- Denis the Carthusian Opera Omnia: English Edition—An active project to translate the complete works of Denis the Carthusian from Latin into English.
- Devotio Deliciosa: Denis the Carthusian on the Eucharist and the Mass (translated by Andrew M. Greenwell) (Angelico Press).
