= Lanspergius =

German Carthusian monk and ascetical writer (1489–1539)

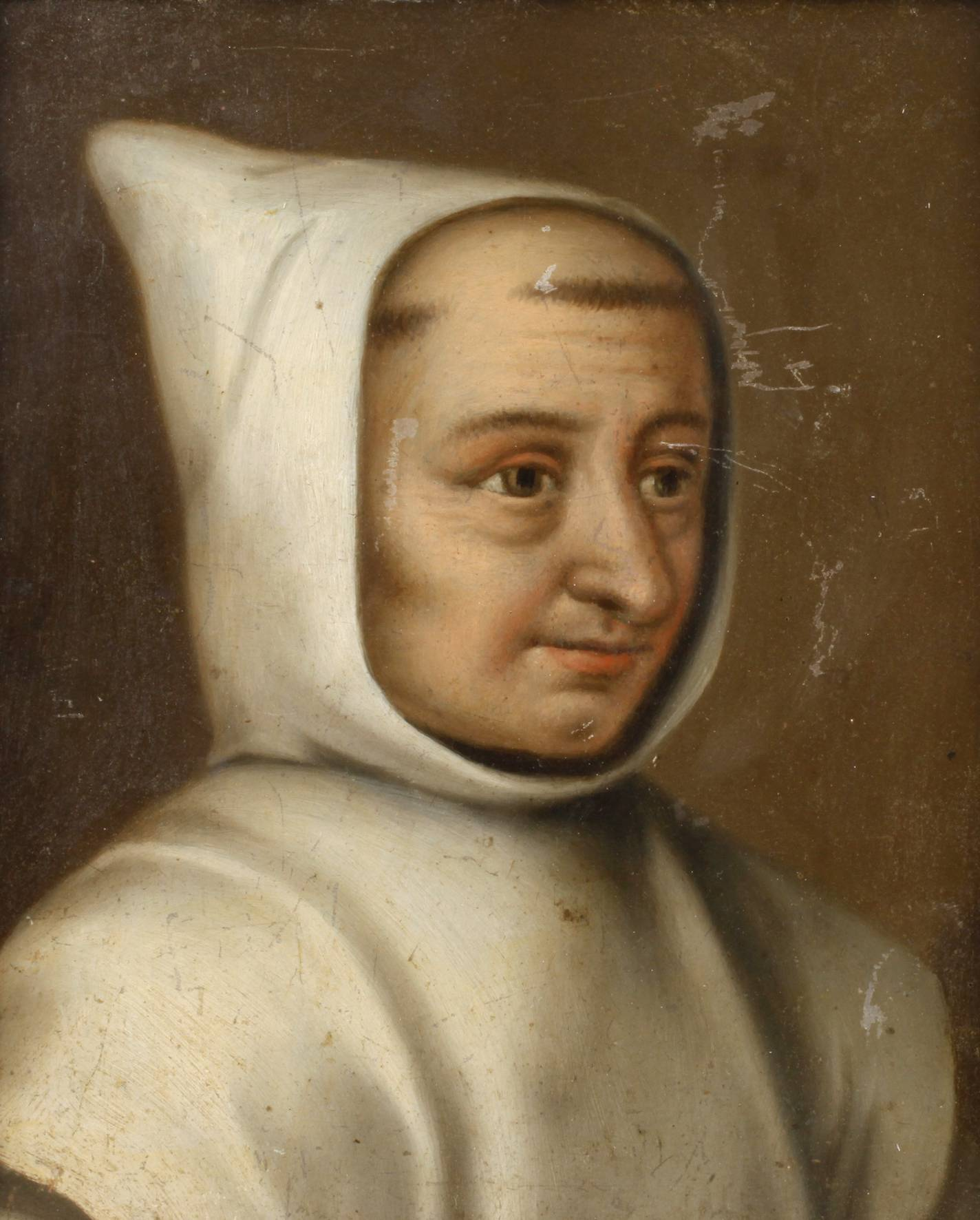
Portrait of Lanspergius

John Justus of Landsberg Cart. (1489 – 10 August 1539) was a German Carthusian monk and ascetical writer.

His family name was Gerecht, of which Justus is merely a Latin translation. The appellation, however, by which he is generally known is Lanspergius (latinization 'of Landsberg'), from his birthplace.

== Biography ==
He was born at Landsberg am Lech in Bavaria in 1489, and died at Cologne on 11 August 1539. After studying philosophy at the University of Cologne, he joined the Carthusian Order at the age of twenty (1509), entering the Charterhouse of St. Barbara at Cologne. He was named novice-master there in 1520, and in 1530 became prior of the Charterhouse of Vogelsang near Jülich, where according to Hermann Joseph Hartzheim, he was also preacher (concionator) to the Court of William, Duke of Jülich, and confessor to the duke's mother. Because of bad health in 1534 he had to return to Cologne, where a few years later he was named sub-prior and remained in that office until his death.

He was a monk of saintly life, employing all the time he could spare from his duties towards others in prayer, contemplation and writing on ascetical and mystical subjects.

== Writings ==
His literary works comprise paraphrases and homilies on the Epistles and Gospels of the liturgical year, sermons for Sundays and festivals, meditations and discourses on the Life and Passion of Christ, and a variety of treatises, sermons, letters, meditations, etc. on subjects pertaining to the spiritual life.

He was not a polemist. Among his productions the only ones of a controversial kind are two dissertations against Lutheran errors (from the Catholic point of view) and in defense of the monastic life. These two treatises are also all that he wrote in German, his other writings being in Latin.

The chief feature of his writings is ardent and tender piety. The Love of God for man, calling for a corresponding love of man for God, is his usual theme treated in various ways. One thing particularly worthy of mark is the frequency with which he speaks of the Heart of Christ, and pressingly exhorts every Christian to take the Sacred Heart as an object of special love, veneration, and imitation. He is noted as perhaps being one of the first to clearly illustrate the principles upon which that devotion is grounded and develop their practical application. He was one of the last, and was perhaps the most precise in language, of those whose written teachings paved the way for Saint Margaret Mary Alacoque and her mission, and helped to prepare the Catholic mind for the great devotion of modern times. He is attributed for the first Latin edition (Cologne, 1536) of the "Revelations of Saint Gertrude".

The best known of his treatises is the Alloquia Jesu Christi ad animam fidelem, which has been translated into Spanish, Italian, French and English.

A new and revised edition of all the works of Lanspergius in Latin has been issued by the Carthusian press of Notre-Dame-des-Prés (Tournai, 1890), in five quarto volumes.

=== Editions and Translations ===
==== Editions ====
- Jo. Justus Lenspergus, Enchiridion militiae christianae, ad novitatem vitae, quae in Christo est, perfecte instituens (Paris: Barbęus and Garamontius, 1545). (Latin edition of the Enchiridion.)

==== Translations ====
- Jean Lanspergius, Enchiridion ou Manuel de la milice sacrée: lectures de piété pour les personnes qui tendent à la perfection, trans. by E. Hasley (Lyon: Pélagaud, 1867). (French translation of the 1551 edition.)
- P. Dom Cyprien-Marie Boutrais, Lansperge-le-Chartreux et la Dévotion au Sacré-Cœur (Grenoble: Cite, 1878). (Includes extracts from Lanspergius's works in French translation, among them the Alloquia Jesu Christi ad animam fidelem.)
- Jean Juste Lansperge, Entretiens de Jésus-Christ avec l'âme fidèle pour lui apprendre à se connaître et à devenir parfaite, 3rd edn (Montreuil-sur-mer: Imprimerie Notre Dame des Prés, 1900). (French translation of the Alloquia Jesu Christi ad animam fidelem, first published 1896.)
- D. Joannes Lanspergius, Pharetra Divini Amoris variis orationibus ignitique aspirationibus referta (Monsterolii: Typis Carthusiae Sanctae Mariae de Pratis, 1892). (Reprinted from the 1890 complete works.)
- Ioannes Lanspergius, An epistle or exhortation of Iesus Christ to the soule, that is deuoutly affected towards him: VVherein, are co[n]tained certaine diuine inspiratio[n]s, teachinng a man to know himself, & instructing him in the perfection of true piety, trans. by Philip Earl of Arundell (Saint-Omer: The English College Press, 1610). (English translation of the Alloquia Jesu Christi ad animam fidelem. This ran to at least four editions.)

===== Other available links to Lanspergius' works =====
- Joannes Justus Lanspergius, Enchiridion militiae christianae, ad novitatem vitae, quae in Christo Jesu est, perfecte instituens (Cologne: Birckmannica, 1557).
- D. Joannes Justus, Opuscula spiritualia, volume II (Cologne, Joannem Kreps, 1630)

== Influence ==
Lanspergius was a significant influence among his fellow Carthusian brothers. He was highly praised in the Chapter Sermons dedicated to the General of the Order (Cologne ed., 1536). His brothers referred to him as "viri certe integerrimi, devotissimique simul in activa et contempliva vita, ac sacris litteris exercitatissimi." The editor of Lanspergius' complete works (1554), described him in the preface as his most worthy teacher within the Carthusian Charterhouse "quondam in nostrae religionis instituto praeceptoris mei dignissimi."

He also developed a close relationship with his Carthusian brother, Bruno Loher, who recognised his "rigorous asceticism, piety and virtues" while highlighting his perfect submission to authority and chosen way of life shortly before Lanspergius died in his fifties.
