= Kinderfest (Memmingen) =

Children's festival in Memmingen, Germany

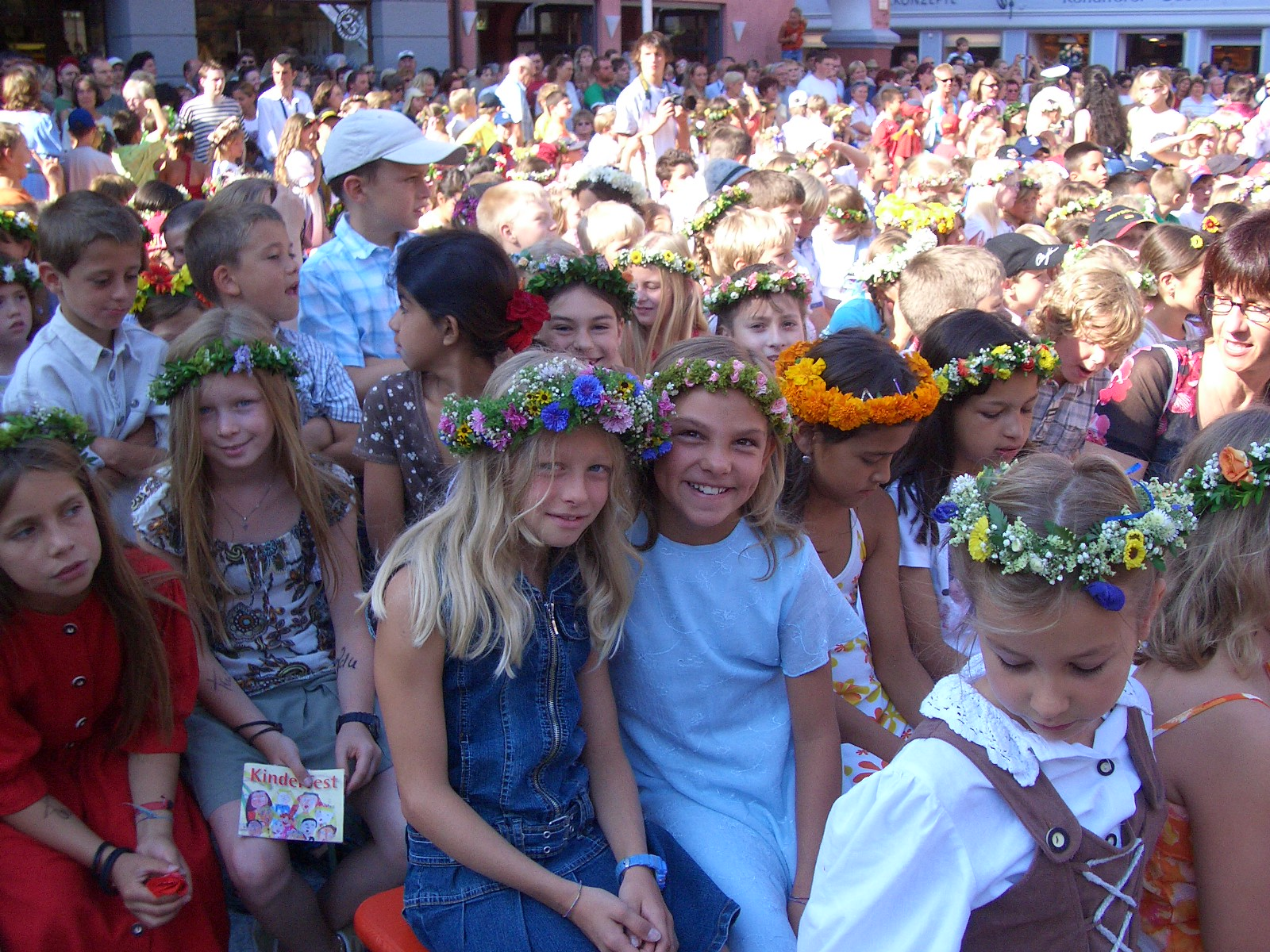
Kids in the marketplace. The girls with the traditional floral wreaths in their hair.

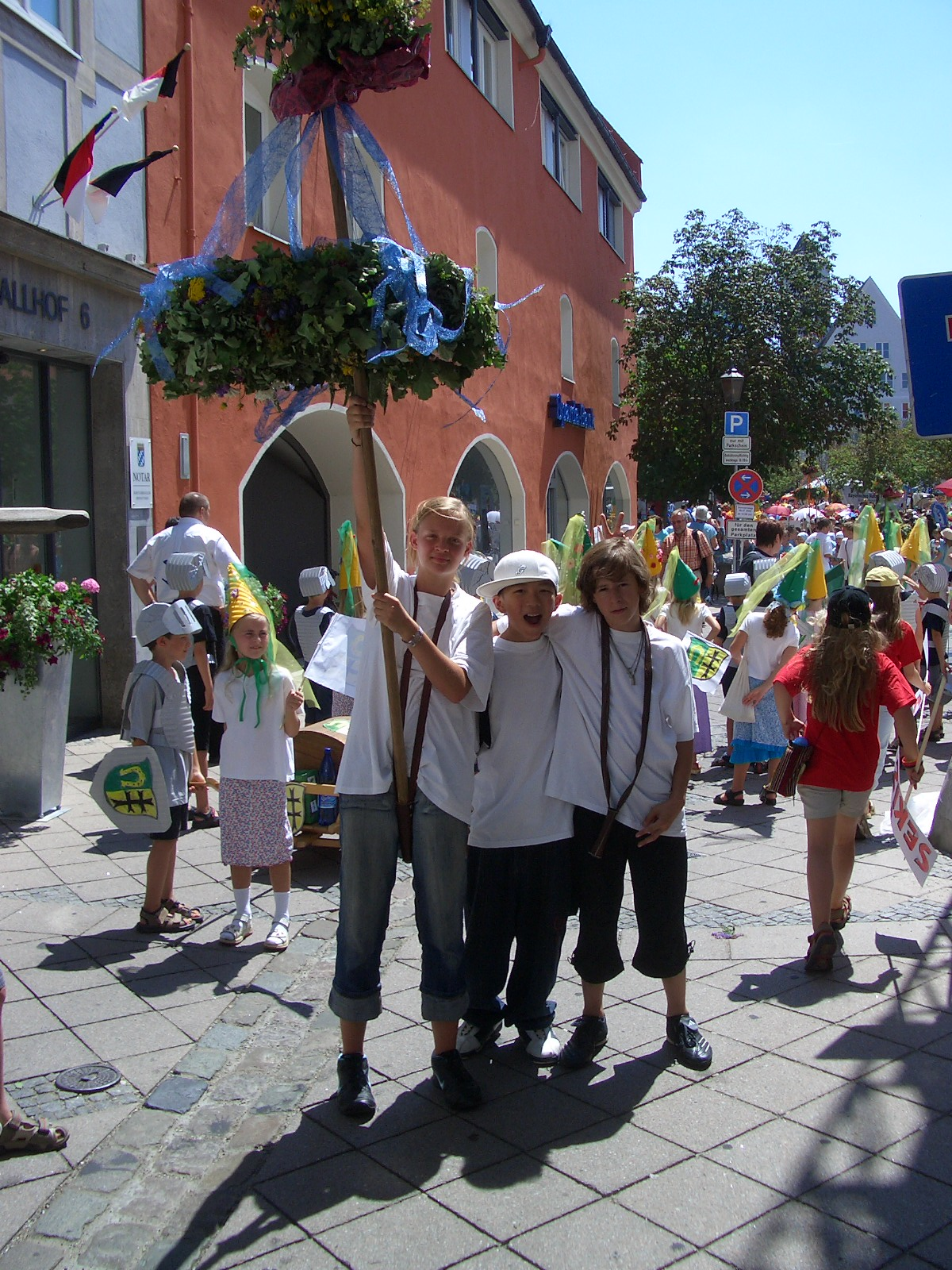
Children with the traditional Stängele

The Kinderfest (Children's Festival) in Memmingen has a tradition going back more than 400 years. Every year more than 2000 children from the municipal primary and secondary schools take part in the festival.

== History ==
The exact beginning of the children's festival is unknown. It probably developed from spring walks of the school classes and the awarding of the best children. The festival was first mentioned in 1571. Referencing to the "Ordnung der Königin inn denn Meidlin Schuolen" from the year 1587, we get a good overview about the course of the festival at that time, as it is still valid almost unchanged. After the spring examination, the girls went to church twice (in the morning and at noon). Then they ate together in the schoolmaster's apartment, bringing the food with them. The best pupils were rewarded, crowned queens and dressed festively. After the round dance in the afternoon, the parents of the queens invited the schoolmasters with their wives and the queen leaders to dinner. A few days later a walk took place. In 1789 the coronation took place for the last time, after there had been many abuses.

Even after the mediatization in 1802, the children's festival was held in unchanged form. After singing songs together on the market square between the festival church services, the schoolchildren moved with music from their schoolyard or the "Hallhof" (courtyard in the city) to the "Reichshain" (park in the city), where various games took place. During the Second World War the children's festival was cancelled.

From 1946 it was held again on the initiative of the town council Ernst-Wilhelm Hermann and some teachers, since 1949 every year thereafter. Since 1950 the children's festival song by Ernst-Wilhelm Hermann, which since has become a tradition, is being sung. The second children's festival song, "Reigen auf dem grünen Rasen", composed by Adalbert Meier and written by Sepp Skalitzky, was performed for the first time in 1969. In 1975 the canon of songs was supplemented with the wake-up call (text and melody by Adalbert Meier).

Since 1955, the children's festival has been held together with the Fischertag in July. Herbert Müller, the chairman of the children's festival committee at the time, also ensured the continuation of the children's festival.

== Today's schedule ==
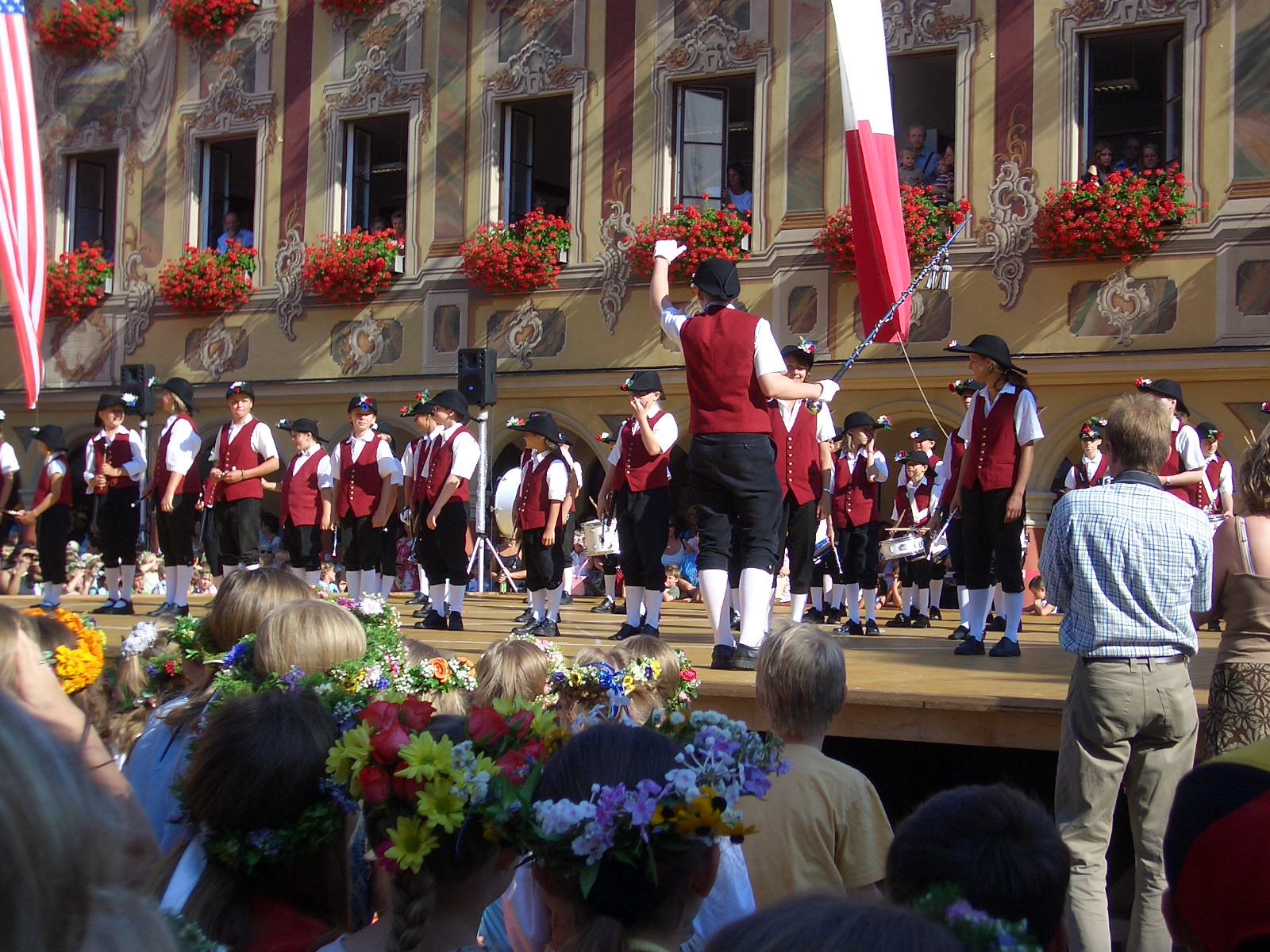
The drummer boys on the grandstand at the market square.

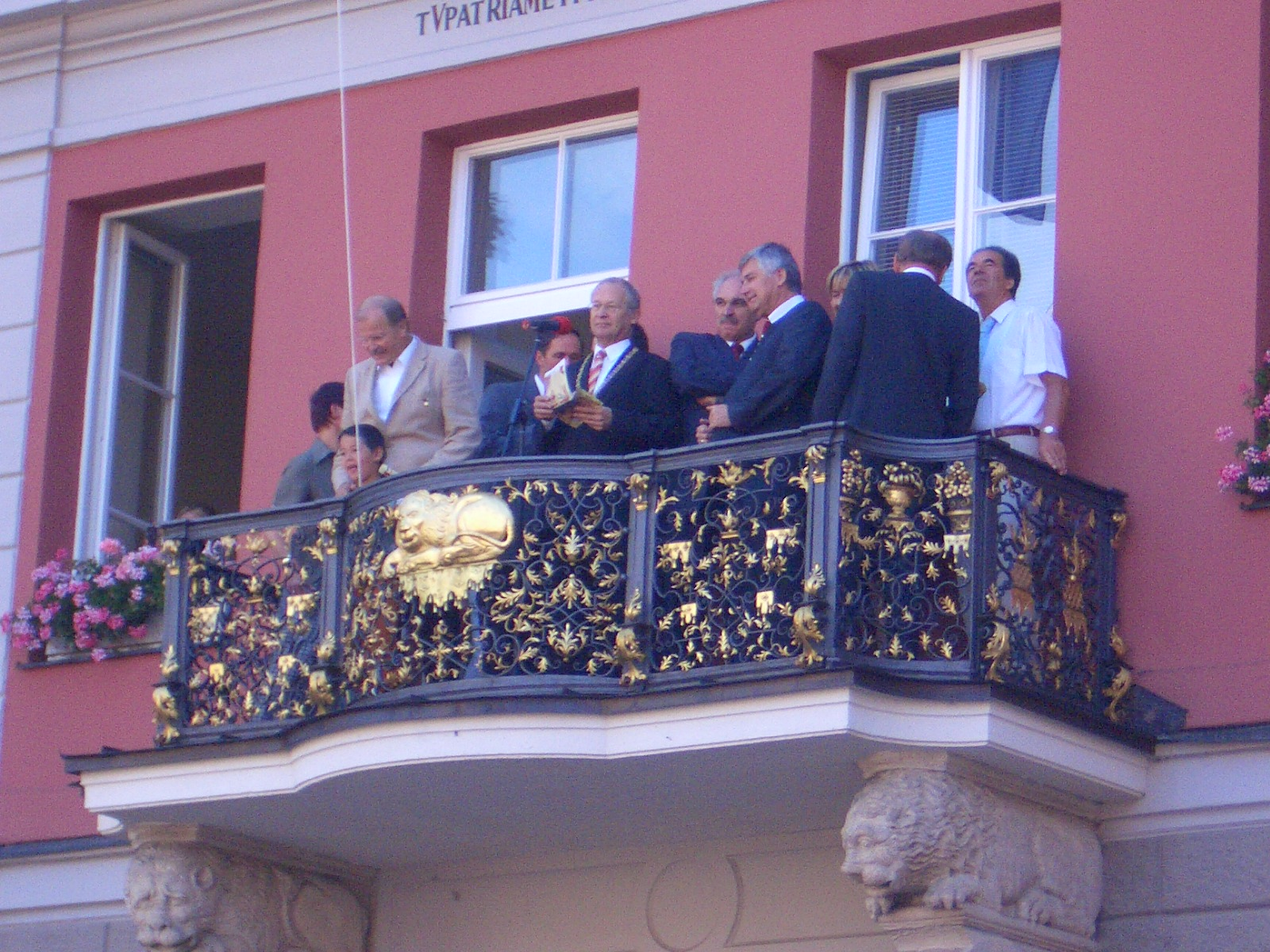
The city's celebrities on the balcony of the Grand Guild.

The Children's Festival takes place on the penultimate Thursday before the Bavarian summer holidays, two days before the Fischertag. On Wednesday evening, numerous Memmingen chapels and groups will be playing music in the old town and playing the so-called "Zapfenstreich". The next morning, the children are festively dressed. The girls traditionally receive a wreath of flowers. After an ecumenical service in the inner-city churches, the children walk to the market square, accompanied by music bands. There they sing on a stage and perform modern and historical dances. The Lord Mayor with his golden chain of office welcomes children and guests from the balcony of the Grand Guild. If the weather is bad, the event takes place in the city's town hall. After the event on the market square, the children return to their schools where they receive presents, including a sausage and a pretzel.

The procession from the "Hallhof" to the stadium grounds starts begins at 1 pm. For this purpose, the children in their school classes come up with various costumes weeks in advance and usually make them themselves. Each school presents a different motto. The parade is accompanied by municipal music bands and chapels from the surrounding area. The final event is the "Memminger Mau wagon", which is accompanied on which the Lord Mayor of the city of Memmingen and dignitaries drive.

On the stadium grounds the children can take part in various games or ride a historic train on wheels and a pony carriage. For the older generations, the city's chapel plays in the stadium hall.

== Symbols of the children's festival ==
The Stängele, which was carried during the parade, was made from the decorated rods and the royal insignia sceptre and crown. It is the actual symbol of the children's festival. The Memmingen children's festival song "Reigen auf dem Grünen Rasen" also belongs to that.

== Children's festival songs ==
- Reigen auf dem grünen Rasen (Adalbert Meier / Sepp Skalitzky)

1. Reigen auf dem grünen Rasen,
Liederklang und Übermut,
Buben putzet eure Nasen,
Mädchen steckt die Kränze gut!
Oberbürgermeister-Kette
leuchtet stolz auf dem Balkon,
Männlein, Weiblein um die Wette,
tummeln sich zum Stadion.

2. Sieben wacker tapfre Schwaben
In dem langen Kinderzug,
wollen gar bis Lindau traben,
auch der Spieß ist lang genug.
Laßt die Musik Märsche schmettern,
haltet fest den Luftballon,
seht, sogar vom Land die Vetter
säumen alle Straßen schon.

3. Körbe mit den letzten Würsten
Und den Bretzen knusprig fein.
Hei, wir leben wie die Fürsten,
wenn auch Sprudel fließt statt Wein.
Kunterbunte Fähnlein flattern
Um des Jahres goldnen Rest,
tausend flinke Zungen schnattern:
Schönes altes Kinderfest!

- Rings im Kranze (E. W. Herrmann / F. Schropp / Adalbert Meier)

1. Rings im Kranze grüner Matte
Wälder, Felder, Bach und Ried,
Liegst Du vor den Allgäu Bergen:
Memmingen! Dir gilt mein Lied!

2. Rauschend führst der Berge Wasser,
Iller, Du, der Donau zu,
Über meinem Heimatstädtchen
lacht der Mau in stiller Ruh!

3. Freude durch die Mauern jubelt.
Wenn geschmückt im Wiesenhag,
Jugend ihren Festtag feiert.
Mit Gesang und Paukenschlag.

4. Vaterstadt im Schwabenlande,
Gott beschirm Dich immerdar.
Friede, leht am Kinderfeste
für dich deine Kinderschar.

- Weckruf (Adalbert Meier)

1. Heute nacht, heute nacht, da bin ich aufgewacht, aufgewacht,
aufgewacht, hab geträumt mir hätt` ein Vogel eine Botschaft bracht,
eine Botschaft bracht.
Ich sinne hin, ich sinne her, was das für eine Botschaft wär'!

2. Heute früh, heute früh, da hab ich nachgedacht, nachgedacht,
nachgedacht, was der Vogel mir im Traum für eine Botschaft bracht,
eine Botschaft bracht.
Jetzt fällt mir's ein, jetzt fällt mir's ein, heut' muß das Kinderfest doch sein!

3. Und schon trommelten die Trommelbuben, daß es kracht, daß es kracht; und
Dann rannte ich zum Fenster und hab gelacht, und hab gelacht!
Drimm, dromm, derum müde Kinder drehten sich noch einmal um.

4. Und dann bliesen die Fanfarenbläser voller Macht, voller Macht bis der letzte
Schläfer schließlich auch noch aufgewacht.
Raus aus dem Bett, raus aus dem Nest, heute ist doch unser schönes Kinderfest!

5. Und dann spielten all' zusammen, daß es dröhnt und schallt, dröhnt und
Schallt und ich horchte ihnen nach, bis es ganz verhallt, bis es ganz verhallt
