= Gertrud Otto =

German art historian

Gertrud Otto (7 June 1895 – 12 October 1970) was a German art historian who researched sculpture of the 15th and 16th centuries, in particular the late Gothic Memmingen and Ulm schools.

== Life ==
Gertrud Otto was born in Memmingen, the daughter of Gustav Otto and Berta Otto, née Derpsch, Her father was the publisher of the Memminger Zeitung as well as a print shop owner. After elementary school she attended the secondary school for girls in Memmingen. In 1910 at the age of 15, she left Memmingen and went to Munich, which at the time was the only place where it was possible for girls to take their Abitur. In July 1916, she passed the Abitur at the Ludwigsgymnasium. She was one of the first women to take the Abitur in Bavaria.

=== Academic career ===
Her further career aspiration was to take up a degree in art history, which was not immediately possible because of the war. As part of the war aid organization, she worked for two years in the editorial office of the Memminger Zeitung and completed a year-long home economics training in Memmingen.

In September 1919, she began studying art history, classical archaeology, pedagogy and psychology at the Ludwig-Maximilians-Universität München. Three years later - in 1922 - she moved to the University of Tübingen. There she submitted her dissertation Die Ulmer Plastik in der Spätgotik (Ulm Sculpture in the Late Gothic) and passed her doctorate on 13 December 1923. She then became an assistant of Georg Weise at the Art History Institute of the University of Tübingen. She stayed there for 17 years.

=== Nazi era and World War II ===
After the Nazis came to power, a difficult time began for Gertrud Otto because she did not sympathize with the Nazi ideology. In order not to lose her job, she became a member of the Nazi women's association in 1935, but refused to become a member of the NSDAP. On 31 March 1936, she was advised to leave university voluntarily.

On 31 March 1941, Otto left the Art History Institute of the University of Tübingen and began work with Otto Kletzl at the newly founded Reichsuniversität Posen, which urgently needed academic staff, including women. On 26 November 1943, Otto completed her habilitation there with the work Das Werk des Ulmer Bildhauers Gregor Erhart (The work of the Ulm sculptor Gregor Erhart). When the Red Army advanced to Posen, Gertrud Otto was evacuated on 20 January 1945; she experienced the end of the war in Memmingen.

=== Postwar ===
From May 1945 to August 1947, she tried in vain to regain a professional footing. In 1947, she applied for a job at the Städtische Realschule, today's Vöhlin-Gymnasium. There she was allowed to teach German and history by the hour. In 1952, she was proposed for the office of deputy school director. It came to light that she had not passed a teaching degree, and it took the intervention of the then mayor Heinrich Berndl to allow her to teach. He managed to keep her employed, albeit under considerably worse conditions: her service contract could be terminated every year, and her number of hours was reduced. The remuneration was correspondingly modest.

In addition to teaching, Gertrud Otto devoted herself again to art historical research and also published. In 1953, she was the first woman in Memmingen to visit the Buxheim choir stalls in the chapel of St. Savior's Hospital in London. Two years later she toured the ancient sites of Greece. In 1960 Gertrud Otto retired from teaching.

During her retirement, she wanted to go to America to research Bernhard Strigel's works there. She even took English lessons from a colleague. A serious illness with subsequent constant care prevented this. In 1970, at the age of 75, she suffered a heart attack and died on 12 October 1970 in Memmingen, where she is buried.

The city of Memmingen honored her by naming a street after her in the south of the city.

== Scholarly focus ==
The focus of her art-historical work was on researching the late Gothic sculpture of the Swabian region. This was also due to the fact that at Georg Weise's chair at the beginning of the 1920s, the entire remaining inventory of plastic works from the 15th and early 16th centuries had been viewed and recorded. She recognized the Ulm Minster and the Minster Builder's Hut there as a center of the sculptural work of that period. This was the era when the sculptural decorations were being made for the Ulm Minster, a favorable situation for the local artists of the time. Her concern was to find out what prompted the artists of that time to abandon the late Gothic plastic forms and find the form of the Renaissance. She documented this development with the artist Bernhard Strigel. Strigel developed from a simple medieval sign maker to the court painter of Emperor Maximilian I. As part of this research, she made trips to the Netherlands to the places that Bernhard Strigel visited on his wanderings in the 1480s and trips in 1507 and 1508. Bernhard Strigel later came to the Viennese court of Emperor Maximilian I, who had gathered the most famous artists of his time there. Here the artist was able to study the spatial conception of the Italian Renaissance. He got to know the sophisticated colorism and figures whose body proportions determined the garment and posture that no longer corresponded to the late Gothic pattern. Her monograph on Bernhard Strigel from 1964 is still the state of the art.

== Publications (selection) ==
- Die Ulmer Plastik des frühen 15. Jahrhunderts. Tübingen 1924.
- Die Ulmer Plastik der Spätgotik. Reutlingen 1927.
- Der Export der Syrlin-Werkstatt nach Graubünden. In: Anzeiger für Schweizerische Altertumskunde 37, 1935, p. 283–291.
- mit Georg Weise: Die religiösen Ausdrucksgebärden des Barock und ihre Vorbereitung durch die italienische Kunst der Renaissance. Stuttgart 1938.
- Hans Multscher. Burg 1939.
- Gregor Erhart. Berlin 1943.
- Kloster Blaubeuren. Berlin 1947.
- Die freigelegten Fresken in der Zangmeisterkapelle der St. Martinskirche In: Memminger Geschichtsblätter. 1963, p. 17–21.
- Bernhard Strigel. Berlin 1964.
- Der Memminger Bildhauer Hans Thoman. In: Memminger Geschichtsblätter. 1965, p. 5–14.
- Ivo und Bernhard Strigel, Hans Thoman. Ergänzungen zu Fragen der Memminger Kunstgeschichte. In: Memminger Geschichtsblätter. 1967, p. 23–28.

== Literature ==
- Robert Stepp: Gertrud Otto und ihr Werk. Memmingen 1995.
- Irmgard Brommersbach, Rita Huber-Sperl, Rosemarie Simmerding, Jutta Stefl-Didden, Peter Wischmann: Frau Dr. habil., Jahrgang 1895. Zur Erinnerung an die Kunsthistorikerin Gertrud Otto (1895–1970). In: Memminger Geschichtsblätter. 1993/96, ISSN 0539-2896, p. 125–143.

== Citations ==
1. Kunsthistorisches Institut in Tübingen biography of Gertrud Otto
2. Archiv der Universität Tübingen Sign. 155/4406 Personal files G. Otto.
