= Wallenstein Festival =

Historical festival in Memmingen, Bavaria, Germany

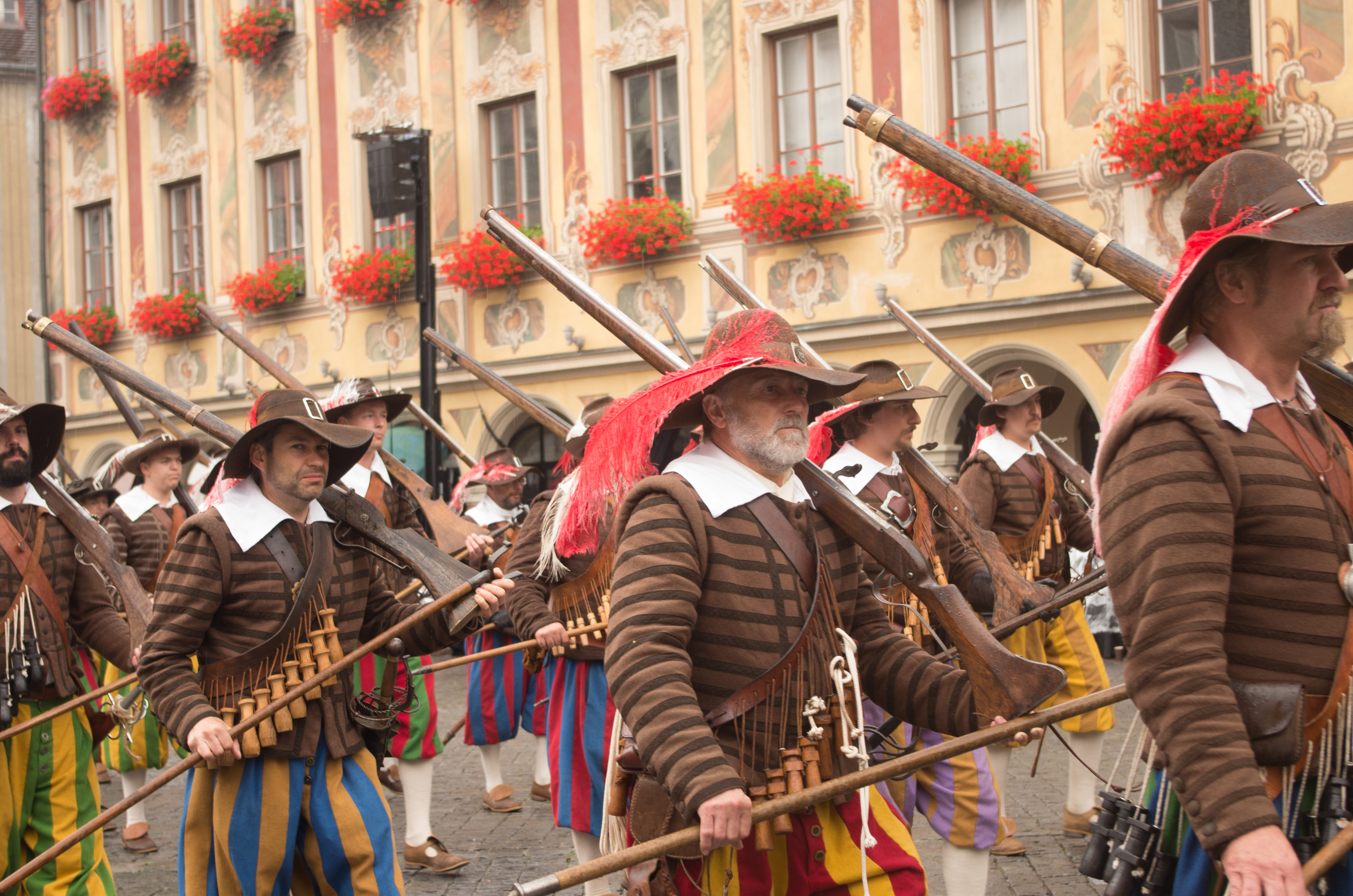
Historical pageant during the 2016 Wallenstein festival

The Wallensteinfestspiele (Wallenstein Festival) in Memmingen, Bavaria, Germany is the largest historical festival in Europe and exists since 1980. Over 4,500 participants with 300 horses reenact the stay of Albrecht Wenzel Eusebius von Waldstein, known as Wallenstein, the supreme commander of the imperial forces of the Holy Roman Empire during the Thirty Years' War, in the city in 1630. The festival is organized every four years in the summer by the Fischertagsverein Memmingen. In 2018, the festival was awarded the Bavarian Heritage Prize.

== History ==
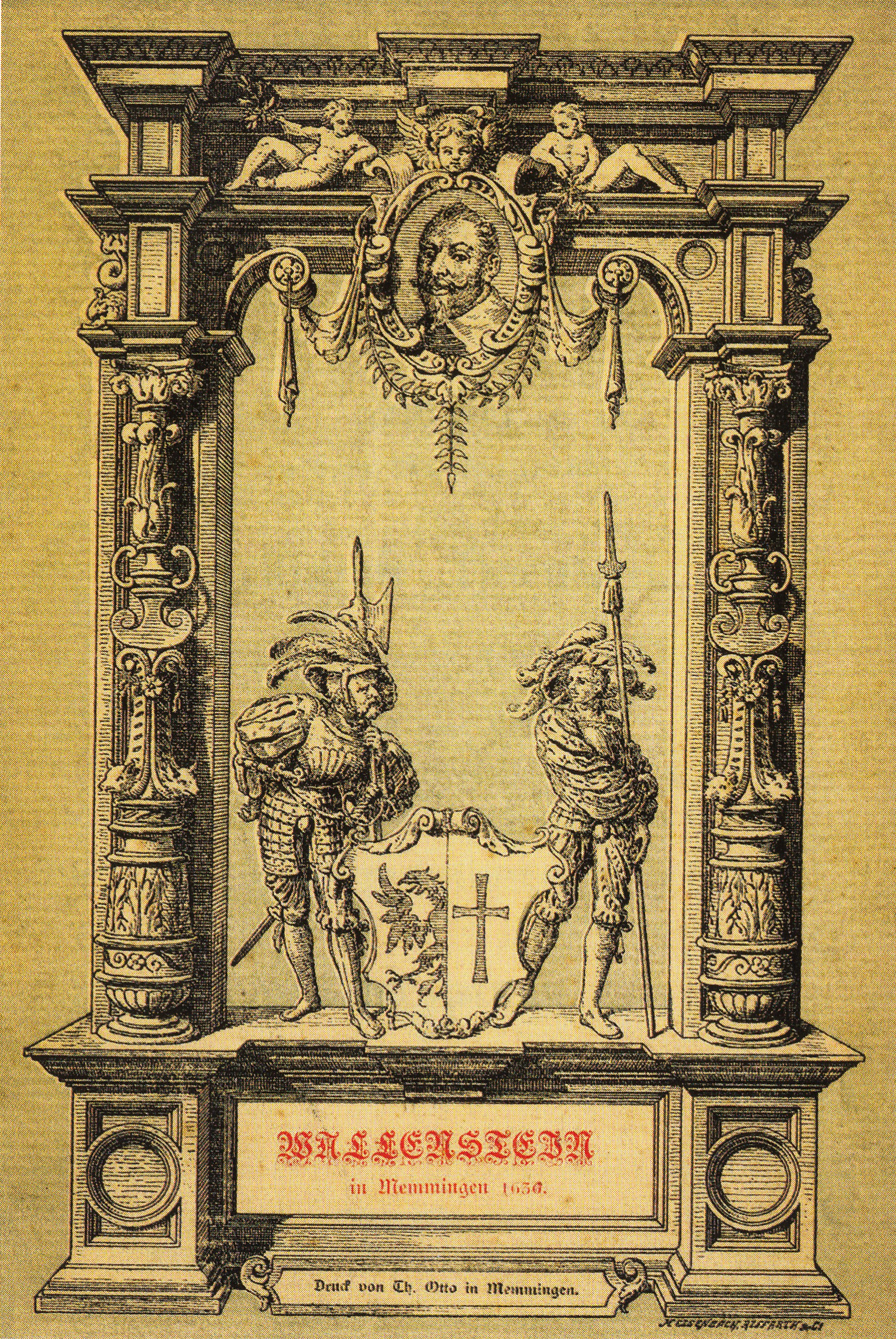
Front Page of the 1895 Wallenstein Festival Program in Memmingen

The first reworking of the historical theme of Wallenstein in Memmingen in 1630 within the framework of a festival took place towards the end of the 19th century. A small initial festival was performed on February 23, 1895, by the reading society Harmonie in the Gasthaus Falken. Subsequently, the festivals were incorporated into the Great Fishermen's Day, which occurred every five years. The first Great Fishermen's Day took place in 1900 and was organized by the city magistrate. In the same year, the association Fischertagsverein Memmingen e. V. was founded, which subsequently participated in the organization of the Fishermen's Day. From 1919 onwards, it was solely responsible for the event.

During the first Great Fishermen's Day in 1900, not only was Wallenstein's arrival in Memmingen depicted, but also the themes of Welf VI with the Crusader group and the Peasants' War. In 1905, Wallenstein was not the focal point, but rather, on the occasion of Crown Prince Ludwig of Bavaria's visit to Memmingen, Emperor Maximilian was featured. The play "Emperor Maximilian in Memmingen" by Bernhard Hofmann was performed. The next Great Fishermen's Day in 1925 after the First World War revisited the theme of Wallenstein, as did the one in 1930. After a break during the Second World War, Great Fishermen's Days were held again every five years from 1950 to 1975 in Memmingen.

For the next Great Fishermen's Day in 1980, there was consideration for a different large-scale event to be held at regular intervals. Three historical major events emerged in the vote. Besides Wallenstein's stay, the Peasants' War with the first proclamation of human rights in Europe, the so-called Twelve Articles, and the Reformation, as well as the first Bavarian period in Memmingen around 1803, were discussed. Due to greater possibilities in representation and to avoid religious conflicts on the topic of the Reformation, it was decided to focus on Wallenstein in Memmingen in 1630. The week-long Wallenstein Festival has been held in Memmingen in 1980, 1983, 1987, and every four years since 1992.

== Festival Schedule ==
The Wallenstein Festival, with around 4,500 participants and an estimated 150,000 visitors in 2016, is the largest historical festival in Europe. The next largest historical festival in Germany is the Landshut Wedding with about 2,000 participants. Due to their high attention to detail, both are among the most notable historical festivals in Germany. The dress code is strictly detailed, and the equipment, such as carts, cannons, flags, muskets, and similar items, are reconstructed. The costumes are all handmade by the organizers based on old pictures and drawings.

=== Pageants ===
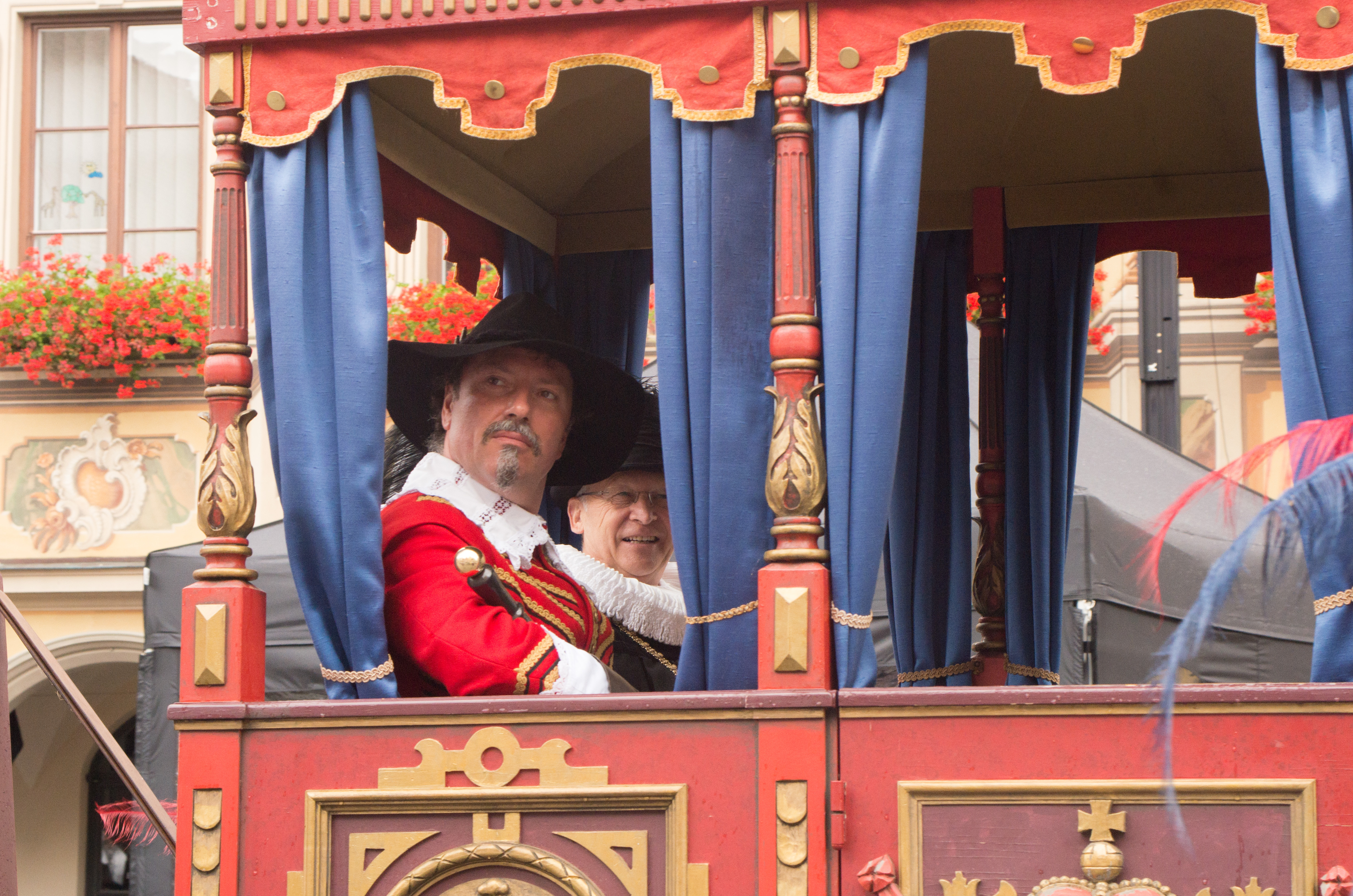
Wallenstein in his horse-drawn carriage during the pageant

On Sundays, Wallenstein's entry or exit from Memmingen takes place. A large parade with all participating festival groups, along with their carts, cannons, horses, etc., begins at Ulmer Tor and proceeds through the city center.

=== Life in the camps ===
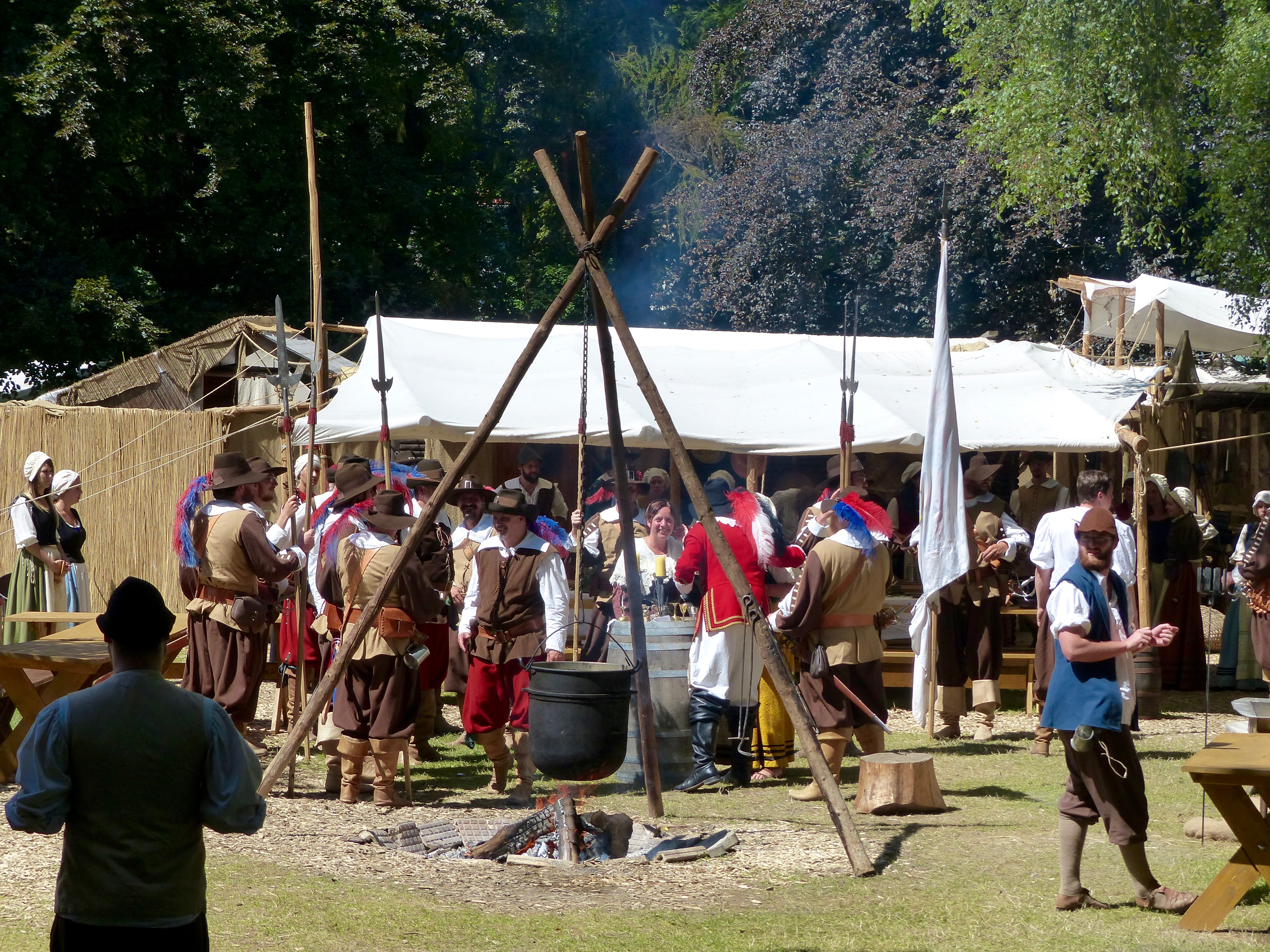
Life in the camps

Throughout the week, the historical camp life is reenacted in Grimmelschanze and Reichshain Park. Each group sets up its own camp, with many selling food and drinks or entertaining visitors with shows and performances.

=== Historical circus and Games of riders ===
Every evening during the week, both a historical circus in the Grimmelschanze featuring acrobat and fire-breather performances and Games of riders in Reichshain park take place.

=== Theater ===
The theater group of the Fischertagsverein performs a play in the Memmingen dialect against the backdrop of the marketplace in the old town during the festival week.

=== Crafts Market ===
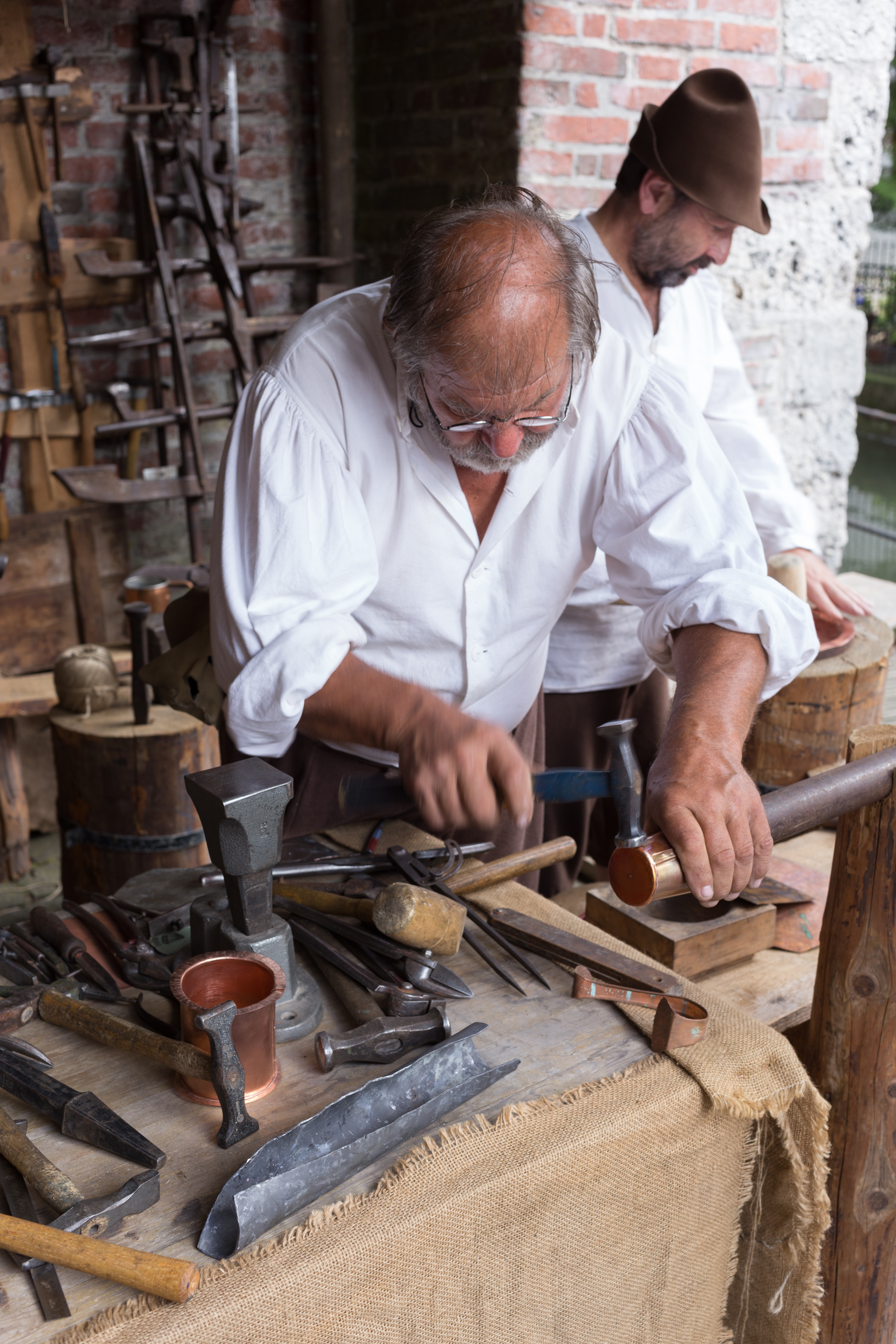
Crafts market

As part of the Wallenstein Festival, craftsmen present their trades at a historical crafts market in Memmingen.

=== Additional Performances ===
During the event week, there is also the Tanz auf dem Kopfstein (Dance on the Cobblestones), a large dance performance in historical costumes on the marketplace, followed by a torchlight procession. Additionally, there is a large battle reenactment with pyrotechnics, usually on Saturday at the Landesgartenschau grounds. The second Sunday of the festival begins with a historical service in St. Martin's Church.

== Historical Background ==
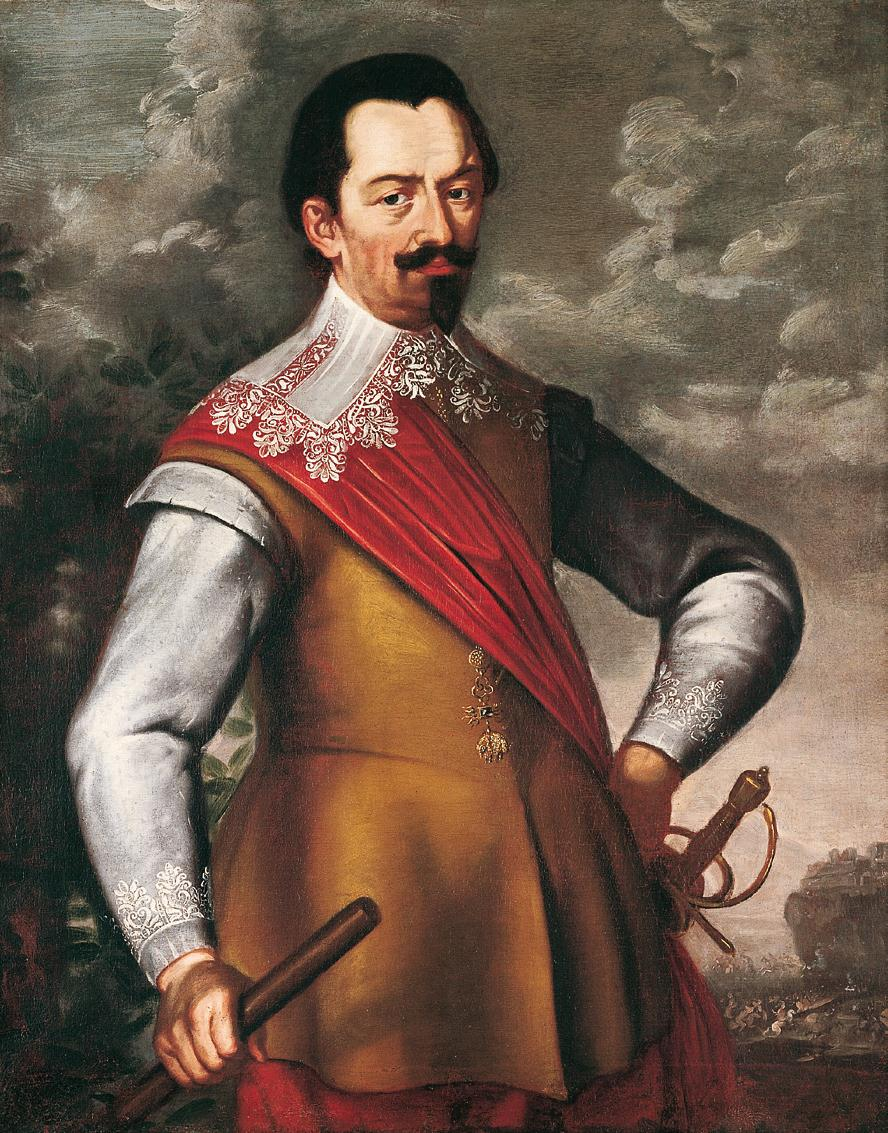
Albrecht Wallenstein

The historical background for the Wallenstein Festival in Memmingen is the stay of Albrecht Wenzel Eusebius von Waldstein in Memmingen from May 30, 1630, to October 22, 1630. Wallenstein was twice the supreme commander of the imperial army during the Thirty Years' War, from 1625 to 1634. He fought on the side of the Emperor and the Catholic League against the Protestant forces of Germany, as well as Denmark and Sweden.

Wallenstein, along with his large court, took up residence for four months in the Fuggerbau. There, he received leading military figures from his army as well as guests and envoys, such as the papal Nuncio Rocci, Cardinal Richelieu's confidant Père Joseph, and Prince Ulrik of Denmark. The latter stayed in Memmingen for 50 days, with feasts and tournaments being held. The city chronicle states: "It was a time of luck and prosperity!"

During his stay in Memmingen, Wallenstein received his dismissal, decided by Emperor Ferdinand II at the Elector's Diet in Regensburg, in the Fuggerbau in July 1630. Due to the active intervention of Gustavus Adolphus of Sweden in the Thirty Years' War, Wallenstein was reappointed as supreme commander in 1632. In that year, the Swedish king also stayed briefly in the Fuggerbau. Wallenstein was declared dismissed again by the Emperor in 1634 and was assassinated on February 25, 1634, in Eger, Bohemia.
