= Andreas Mayer (politician) =

German politician (born 1995)

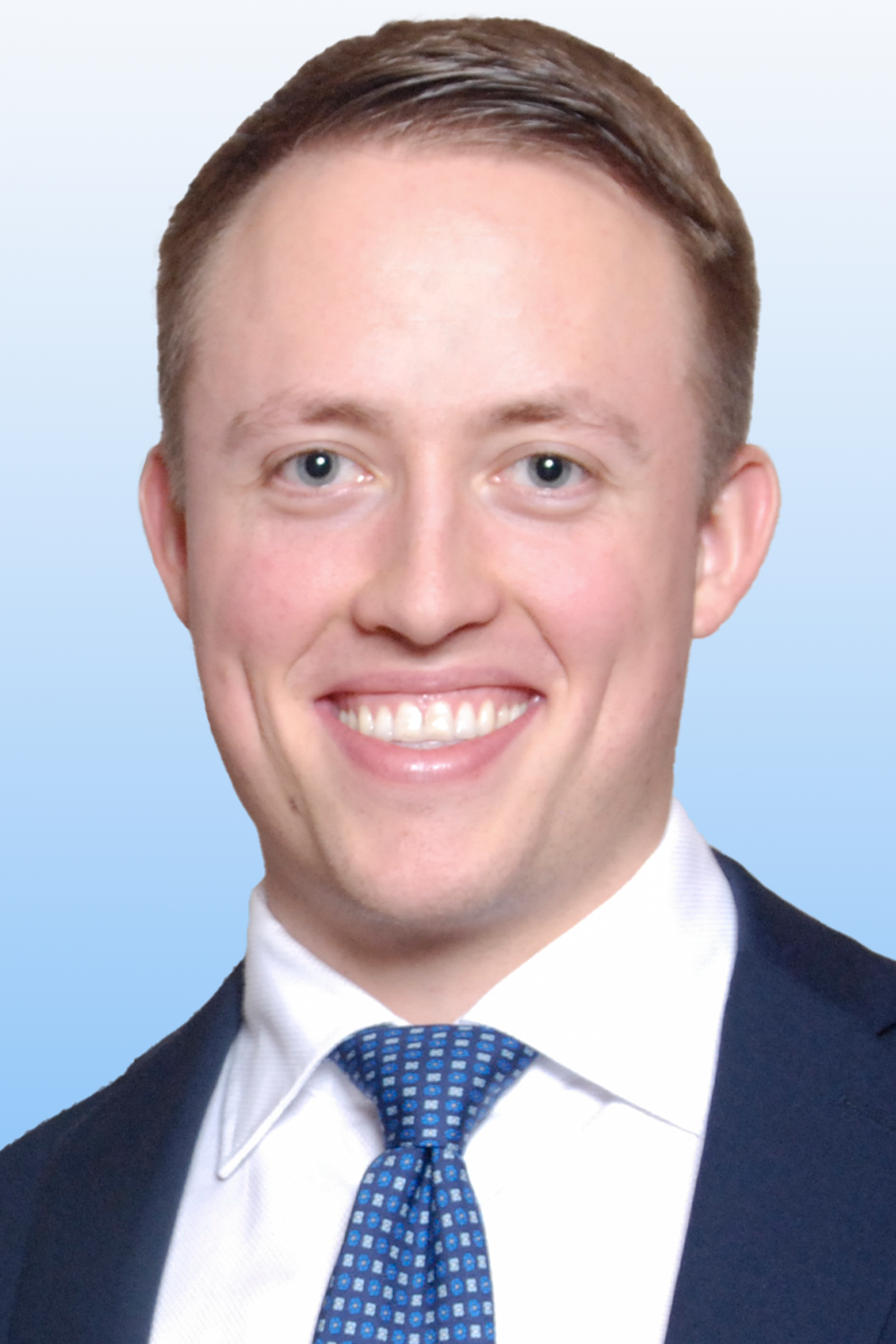
- Mayer in 2019

Member of the Bundestag
- Incumbent
- Assumed office 25 March 2025
- Constituency: Bavaria

Personal details
- Born: 25 January 1995 (age 31) Memmingen
- Party: Alternative for Germany

Andreas Mayer (born 25 January 1995 in Memmingen) is a German politician who was elected as a member of the Bundestag in 2025. He has served as treasurer of the Alternative for Germany in Oberallgäu-Kempten since 2023.
