= Memmingen =

- Town
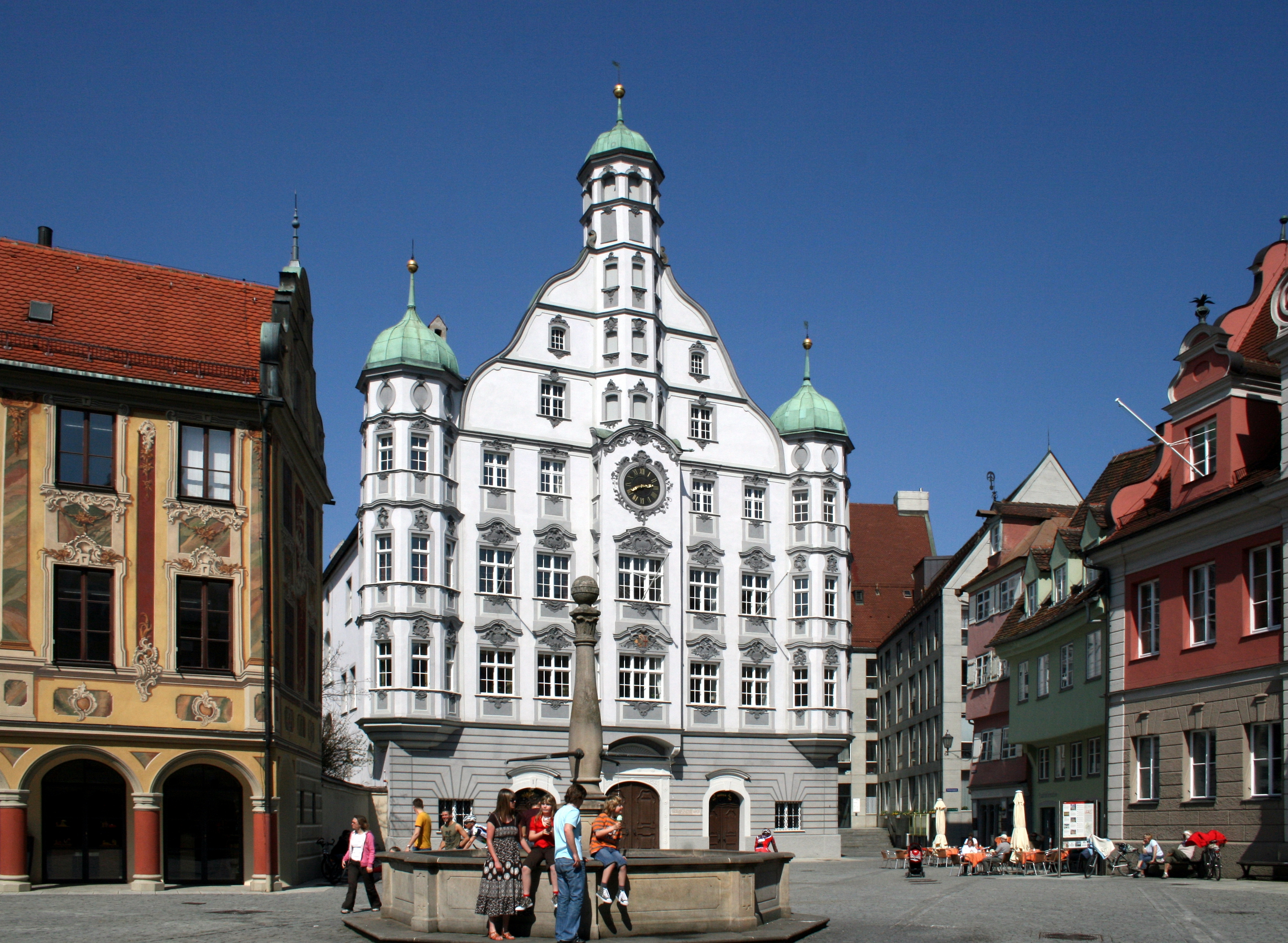
- The Renaissance town hall of Memmingen

- Flag Coat of arms
- Interactive map of Memmingen
- Location within Germany Location within Bavaria
- Coordinates: 47°59′16″N 10°10′52″E
- Country: Germany
- State: Bavaria
- Admin. region: Swabia
- District: Urban district

Government
  - Mayor (2023–29): Jan Rothenbacher (SPD)

Area
  - Total: 70.11 km^{2} (27.07 sq mi)
- Elevation: 601 m (1,972 ft)

Population (2025-12-31)
  - Total: 44,378
  - Density: 633.0/km^{2} (1,639/sq mi)
- Time zone: UTC+01:00 (CET)
  - Summer (DST): UTC+02:00 (CEST)
- Postal codes: 87700
- Dialling codes: 08331
- Vehicle registration: MM
- Website: Memmingen.de

Memmingen (German: [ˈmɛmɪŋən]; Swabian: Memmenge) is a town in Swabia, Bavaria, Germany. It is the economic, educational and administrative centre of the Danube-Iller region. To the west, the town is flanked by the Iller river, which marks the Baden-Württemberg border. To the north, east and south the town is surrounded by the district of Unterallgäu (Lower Allgäu).

With about 42,000 inhabitants, Memmingen is the fifth biggest town in the administrative region of Swabia. The origins of the town go back to the Roman Empire. The old town, with its many courtyards, castles and patricians' houses, palaces and fortifications is one of the best preserved in southern Germany. With good transport links by road, rail and air, it is the transport hub for Upper Swabia and Central Swabia, and the Allgäu.

Due to its proximity to the Allgäu region, Memmingen is often called the Gateway to the Allgäu (Tor zum Allgäu). The town motto is Memmingen – Stadt mit Perspektiven ("Memmingen – a town with perspectives"). In recent times it has been frequently referred to as Memmingen – Stadt der Menschenrechte (Memmingen – the town of human rights). This alludes to the Twelve Articles, considered to be the first written set of human rights in Europe, which were penned in Memmingen in 1525. Every four years there is the Wallensteinfestspiel, with about 4,500 participants, the biggest historical reenactment in Europe. It commemorates the invasion of Wallenstein and his troops in 1630.

== History ==
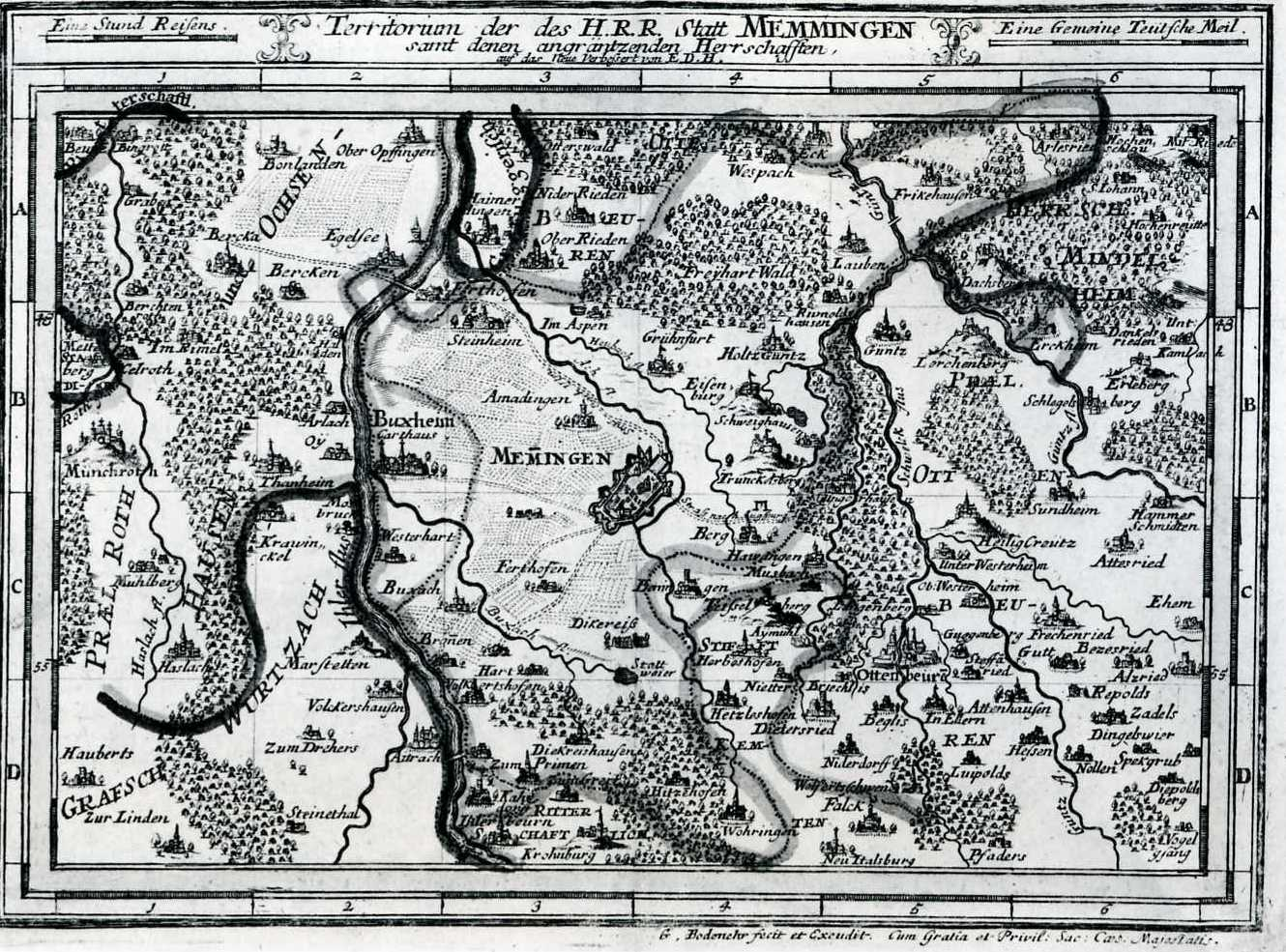
Territory of the Free Imperial City of Memmingen

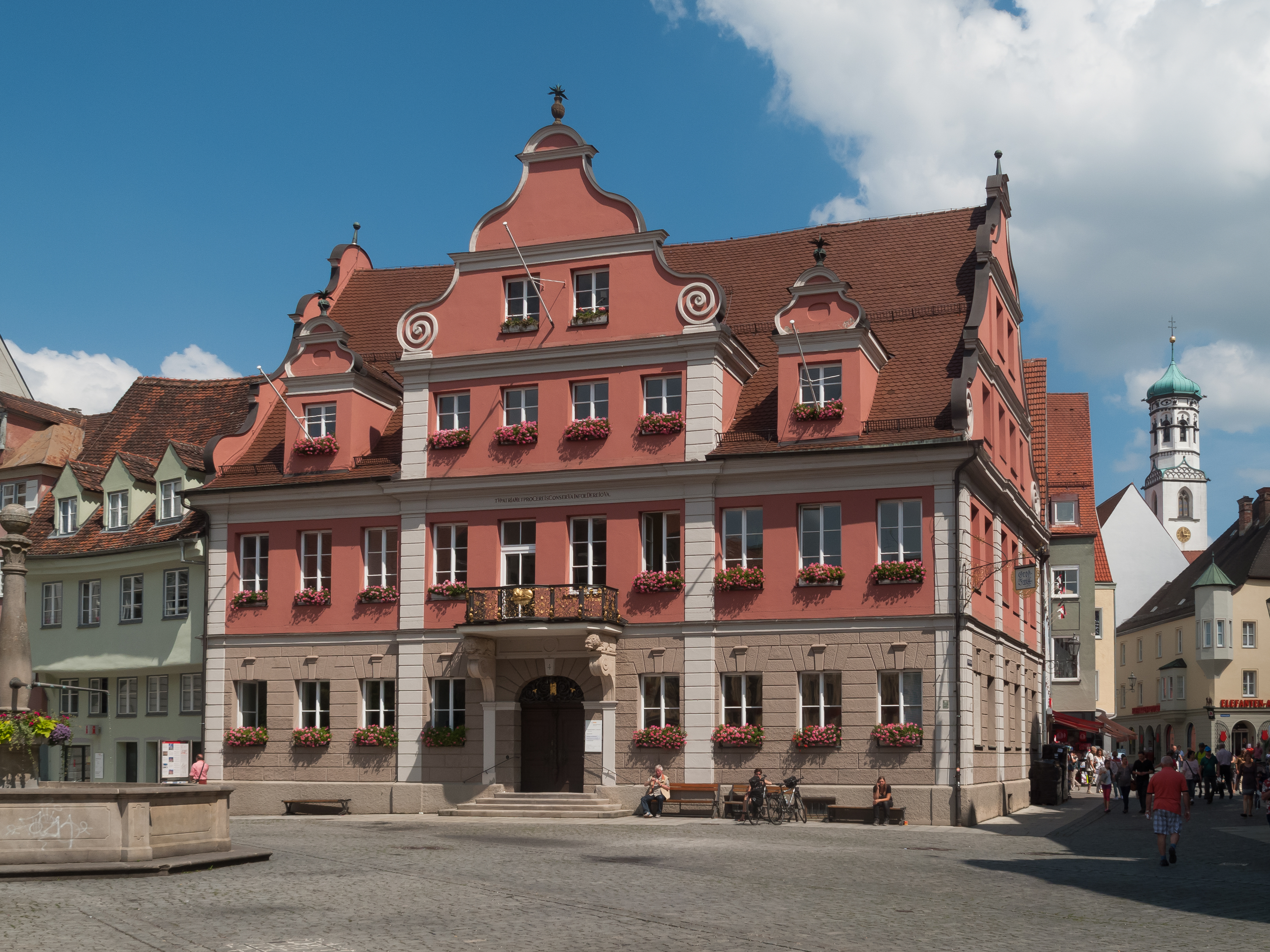
Monumental building: der Grosszunft

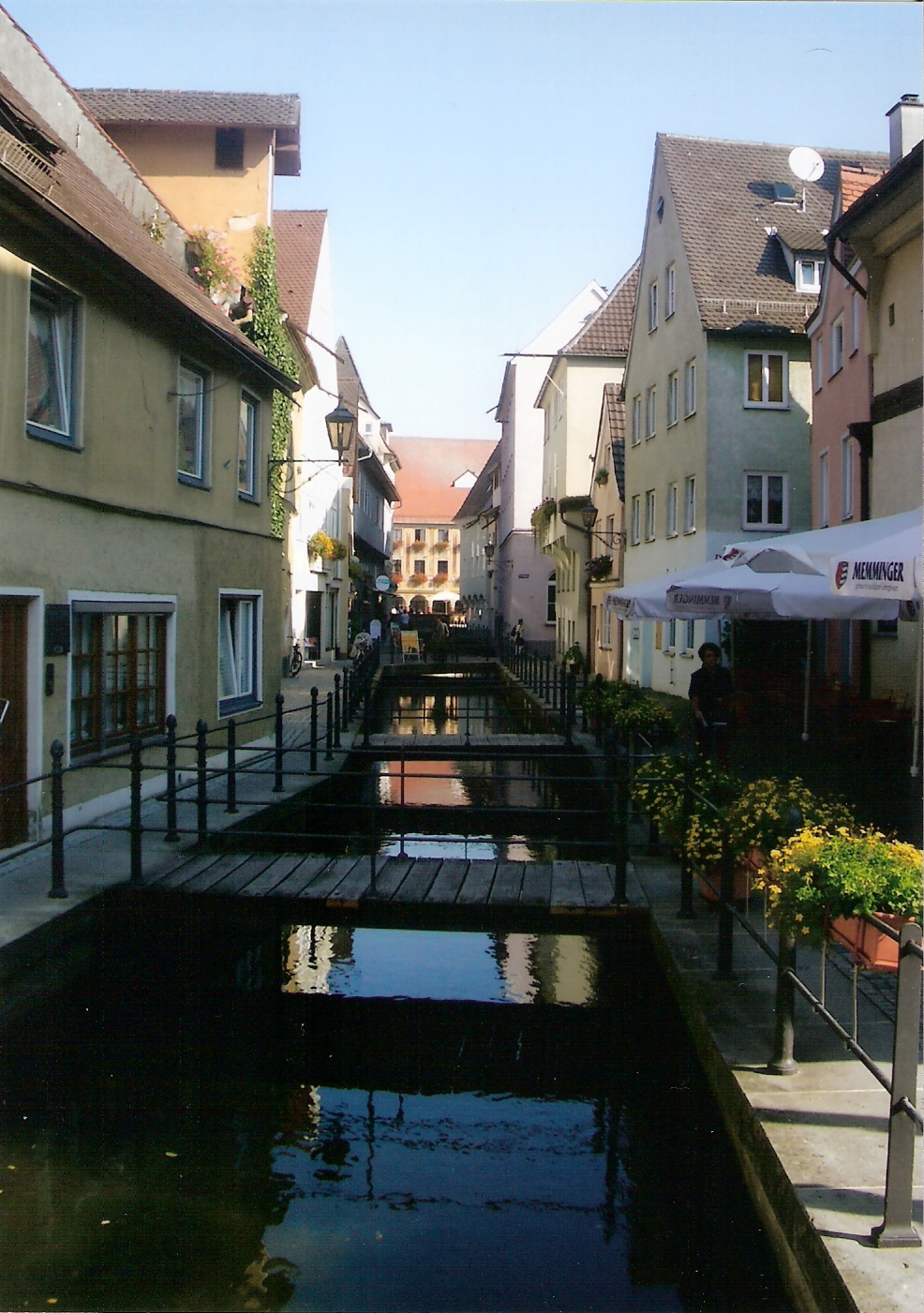
The picturesque Stadtbach (Town Brook)

It is believed that on the site of present-day Memmingen in Roman times there was a small military town, probably called Cassiliacum. In the 5th century an Alemannic settlement was established and in the 7th century there was a palace belonging to the king of the Franks.

Memmingen was linked to Bohemia, Austria and Munich by the salt road to Lindau. This road helped Memmingen gain importance as a trading centre. In the Middle Ages, the place was known as Mammingin; in 1158 the Welfian Duke Welf VI founded the town of Memmingen. In 1286 it became an Imperial City, responsible only to the Holy Roman Emperor.

Christoph Schappeler, the preacher at St. Martin's in Memmingen during the early 16th century, was an important figure during the Protestant Reformation and the German Peasants' War. His support for peasant rights helped to draw peasants to Memmingen. The city first followed the Tetrapolitan Confession, and then the Augsburg Confession.

The Twelve Articles: The Just and Fundamental Articles of All the Peasantry and Tenants of Spiritual and Temporal Powers by Whom They Think Themselves Oppressed was written (probably by Schappeler and Sebastian Lotzer) in early 1525. This was a religious petition borrowing from Luther's ideas to appeal for peasant rights. Within two months of its publication in Memmingen, 25,000 copies of the tract were in circulation around Europe. These are the first known set of human rights documents in the world (if one ignores Magna Carta in England in 1215).

In the 1630s Memmingen was at centre stage during the Thirty Years' War, and the Imperial generalissimo Wallenstein was quartered in the town when he was dramatically dismissed from service. From 1632 Memmingen was briefly garrisoned by the Swedish army, and became a base of operations for Swedish troops in Swabia. In September 1647 the Imperialists under Adrian von Enkevort besieged the Swedish garrison, under Colonel Sigismund Przyemski. Two months later the town surrendered.

Following the reorganization of Germany in 1802, Memmingen became part of Bavaria. The 19th century saw the slow economic deterioration of the town, which was halted only with the building of a railway following the course of the River Iller.

Since World War II Memmingen has been a developing town, with a rate of economic growth above the average for Bavaria.

== Geography ==
Memmingen is located at the western border of Bavaria at the river Iller, 50 km south of Ulm, and 100 km west of Munich. The landscape or region beginning with Memmingen is called Unterallgäu and forms a part of the region Mittelschwaben who is next to Oberschwaben and Allgäu. Memmingen is also sometimes called the Gate to the Allgäu.

=== Climate ===
Climate data for Memmingen, elevation 615 m (2,018 ft), (1991–2020 normals, extremes 1961–present)
Month	Jan	Feb	Mar	Apr	May	Jun	Jul	Aug	Sep	Oct	Nov	Dec	Year
Record high °C (°F)	15.9 (60.6)	19.5 (67.1)	22.8 (73.0)	28.0 (82.4)	30.4 (86.7)	36.6 (97.9)	35.8 (96.4)	34.8 (94.6)	29.9 (85.8)	26.5 (79.7)	20.8 (69.4)	16.7 (62.1)	36.6 (97.9)
Mean daily maximum °C (°F)	2.8 (37.0)	4.4 (39.9)	9.1 (48.4)	13.9 (57.0)	18.2 (64.8)	21.7 (71.1)	23.6 (74.5)	23.4 (74.1)	18.5 (65.3)	13.4 (56.1)	7.0 (44.6)	3.4 (38.1)	13.3 (55.9)
Daily mean °C (°F)	−0.3 (31.5)	0.3 (32.5)	4.1 (39.4)	8.2 (46.8)	12.7 (54.9)	16.2 (61.2)	17.8 (64.0)	17.4 (63.3)	12.9 (55.2)	8.6 (47.5)	3.6 (38.5)	0.5 (32.9)	8.5 (47.3)
Mean daily minimum °C (°F)	−3.4 (25.9)	−3.4 (25.9)	−0.3 (31.5)	2.6 (36.7)	7.1 (44.8)	10.7 (51.3)	12.3 (54.1)	11.9 (53.4)	8.2 (46.8)	4.7 (40.5)	0.5 (32.9)	−2.4 (27.7)	4.0 (39.3)
Record low °C (°F)	−25.2 (−13.4)	−23.2 (−9.8)	−25.1 (−13.2)	−8.8 (16.2)	−3.7 (25.3)	−0.4 (31.3)	3.0 (37.4)	3.2 (37.8)	−1.6 (29.1)	−6.6 (20.1)	−15.4 (4.3)	−23.2 (−9.8)	−25.2 (−13.4)
Average precipitation mm (inches)	51.5 (2.03)	45.9 (1.81)	57.9 (2.28)	64.3 (2.53)	108.5 (4.27)	124.6 (4.91)	118.9 (4.68)	117.7 (4.63)	80.1 (3.15)	65.7 (2.59)	62.0 (2.44)	63.9 (2.52)	961 (37.84)
Average precipitation days (≥ 0.1 mm)	15.3	14.3	15.2	13.8	16.6	16.8	15.8	15.0	14.5	15.7	15.4	17.6	186
Average relative humidity (%)	85.5	82.1	78.1	73.7	73.9	73.9	76.2	81.3	84.9	88.1	87.0	79.9	80.4
Mean monthly sunshine hours	66.3	88.5	127.2	165.5	196.6	205.3	232.5	213.4	156.3	113.3	67.7	51.2	1,683.8
Source 1: SKlima
Source 2: WetterzentraleDeutscher Wetterdienst (sun 1981–2010)

== Transport ==
Memmingen is reached by the A7 and the A96 motorways and Memmingen station is on railways connecting Munich and Lindau and the Ulm–Oberstdorf railway.

The town is served by Memmingen Airport which provides direct routes to some European destinations. The nearest major international airport is Munich Airport, located 142 km (88 mi) east of Memmingen.

== Economy ==
Most companies are SMEs, including the following:

- Alpine Hydraulik GmbH
- Berger Holding
- Dachser Logistics
- Gebrüder Weiss
- Gefro Reformversand Frommlet
- Hans Kolb Wellpappe
- Goldhofer
- Magnet-Schultz
- Metzeler Schaum GmbH
- Pfeifer Holding
- Rohde & Schwarz

== Politics ==
Although the Lord Mayor has been from the Social Democratic Party of Germany for most of the time since the end of the World War II (1948 - 1952, 1966 - 2016, and since 2023), the biggest party in the town council is traditionally the Christian Social Union.

The town politics is mostly dominated by a coalition of bigger parties ("coalition of the reasoned") from CSU, SPD, Christlicher Rathausblock Memmingen (Christian Town Hall Party Memmingen) and the Free Voters. The smaller parties of Ecological Democratic Party, Alliance '90/The Greens and the Free Democratic Party make up the opposition.

There was a hefty dispute between the parties in 2005, concerning financial participation in the Memmingen Airport. The Ecological Democratic Party and the Greens initiated a referendum to inhibit financial support for the airport, but this vote met with no success.

At the top of the town government is the Lord Mayor, who is elected directly by the people. He is the representative of the town and the leader of municipality. As second representatives, the majors are elected from the members of the town council. Historically the CSU, as biggest party, appoints the second major. The third major is appointed by the third biggest party. The second biggest party, the SPD, traditionally declines to appoint the third major, because they already appoint the Lord Mayor.

Memmingen is building, alongside the double centre Ulm/Neu-Ulm, the second economical centre in Upper Swabia. It thus leads the central supply function for the adjoining cities and districts.

=== Town council ===
The last local elections were on March 2, 2008, with following results:

	CSU	SPD	CRB ¹	FV	Greens	ödp	FDP	Sum
Seats	13	9	4	5	3	4	2	40
Percent	32,2%	22,0%	10,8%	11,8%	6,7%	10,5%	5,9%	

¹ Christlicher Rathausblock Memmingen ("Christian Townhall-Party")

=== Lord Mayors ===
- 1884–1909: Karl Scherer
- 1910–1931: Fritz Braun
- 1932–1945: Heinrich Berndl, NSDAP
- 1945–1948: Georg Fey, CSU
- 1948–1952: Lorenz Riedmiller, SPD
- 1952–1966: Heinrich Berndl, without party
- 1966–1968: Rudolf Machnig, SPD
- 1968–1980: Johannes Bauer, SPD
- 1980–2016: Ivo Holzinger, SPD
- 2016: Markus Kennerknecht, SPD (died while in office)
- 2026-2017: vacant, interim: 2nd mayor Margareta Böckh, CSU
- 2017–2023: Manfred Schilder, CSU
- 2023-today: Jan Rothenbacher, SPD

=== Town finances ===
With €512 per capita, Memmingen is one of the cities in Germany with the lowest level of debt (The German average is more than €1,300). The town had 2007 a management budget (Verwaltungshaushalt) of €94,925,160 and an asset budget (Vermögenshaushalt) of €19,490,860. The income from trade taxes amounted to about €40 million, the income tax assignment to about €20 million. The local rates were last changed in 2003. The town has many charitable foundations, with roots partly going back to the Middle Ages (such as the Unterhospitalstiftung).

=== Coat of arms and flag ===
Blazon: Split from gold and silver, in front a half, reinforced in red, black eagle. Backward a red pawcross

The town's colours, handed down since 1488, are Black, Red, White. The flag is a banner flag with cross bar.

Amendingen and Eisenburg have their own historical coats of arms.

== Culture and main attractions ==
=== Historic festivals ===
Every year Memmingen celebrates the Fischertag (Fisherman's day), recreating medieval traditions. The town brook is fished out to be completely drained and cleaned, and at the same time a "Fisherman's King" (the one that caught the heaviest trout) is appointed among almost 1,200 fishermen. Every year up to 40,000 people come to this festival as participants or spectators.

Every four years Memmingen re-enacts the events around the visit of Wallenstein in the year 1630 with Europe's biggest historic festival: the Wallensteinfestspiele (Memmingen).

=== Theatre ===
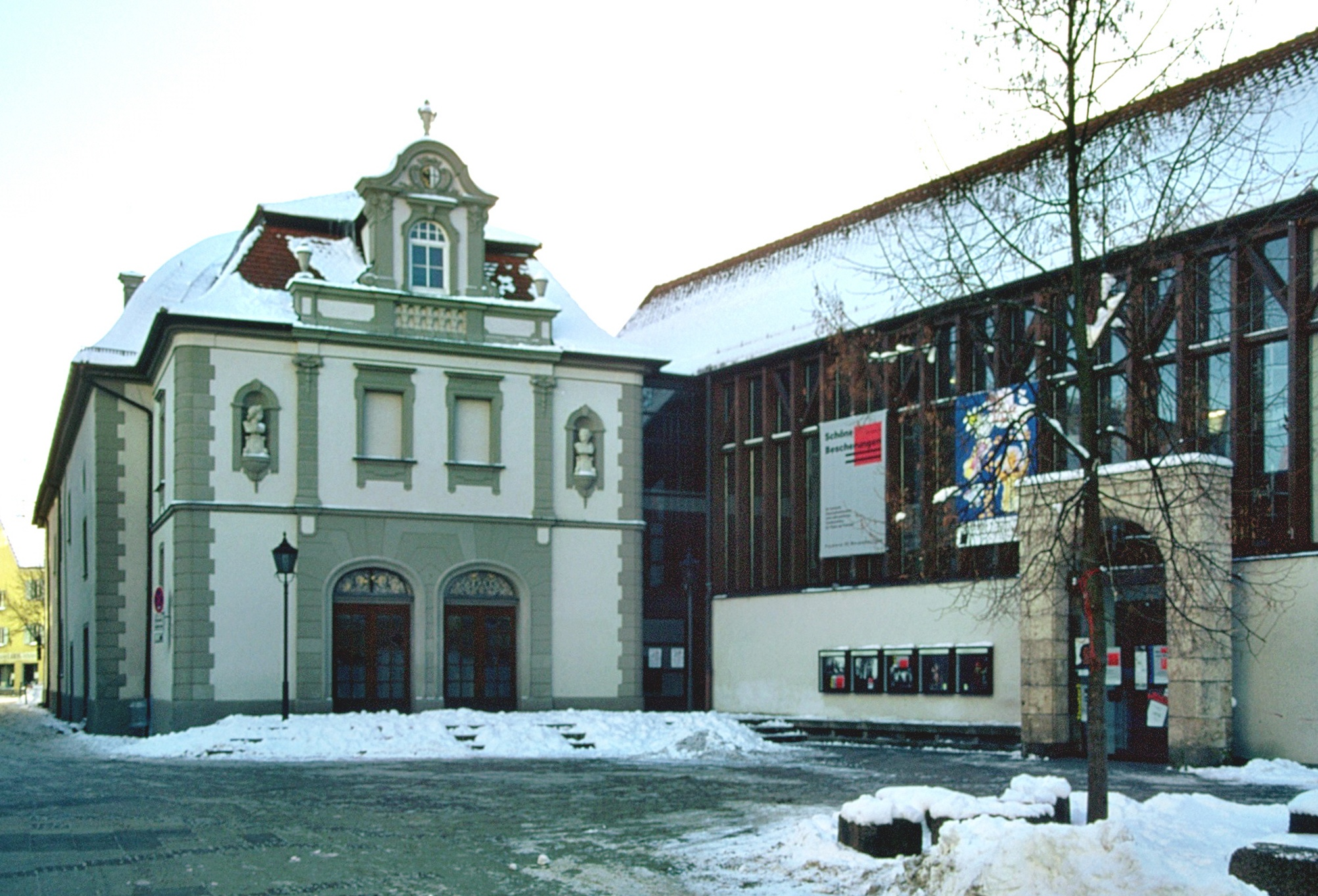
The Landestheater Schwaben in Memmingen

The theatre has a long tradition in Memmingen. By the Middle Ages some chroniclers were already recording different theatre performances. In 1937 the Landestheater Schwaben (State Theatre of Swabia) or LTS was founded in the town. In 1945, after World War II, the LTS was one of the first theatres in West Germany to begin putting on performances again. The performances take place in the Rooms of the Town Theatre, the theatre at the Schweizerberg (cabaret stage), in the Kaminwerk cultural centre or in rooms at the boroughs of Memmingen. The Schweizerberg Theatre will be closed at the end of 2010. It will move to new premises in the Elsbethen area, behind the Town Theatre, where a new cabaret stage, rehearsing rooms, workshops, depots, management rooms, the foyer and some guest rooms will be built. Another theatre was founded by Helmut Wolfseher and members of the Alternative Kleinkunst e.V. (Alternative Cabaret Society), Parterretheater im Künerhaus (PIK). This theatre is specifically for amateur actors and young talented musicians. The Kaminwerk also puts on major plays by amateur actors. The municipal hall is for Volksschauspieler or other artists.

The following works featuring Memmingen have been produced:

- Stage play Memmingen from Bettina Fless (1989)
- Book Mohr of Memmingen from Utz Benkel
- Song Memmingen by Blackmore’s Night, see also Shadow of the Moon

Stage plays and operas that have had world premières in Memmingen are:

- 1995: The Jewbank
- Metal-Operas by David DeFeis:
  - 1999: Klytaimnestra
  - 2001: Hel
  - 2005: Lilith
- 2005: Mohr of Memmingen
- 2007: Green Organes
- 2008: Katharina and Till (10 January 2009)

=== Museums ===
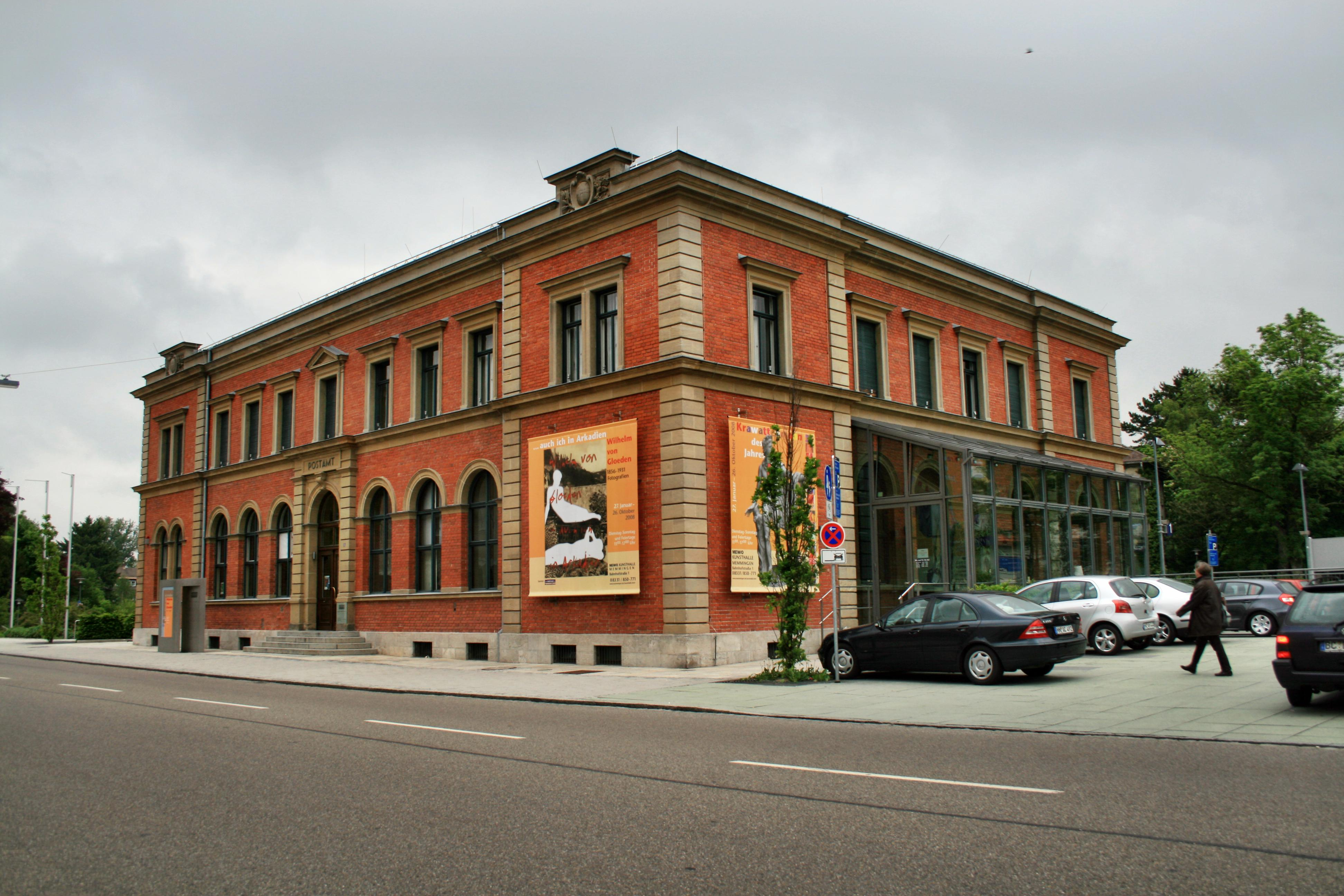
MeWo-Kunsthalle (art hall)

The biggest museum in Memmingen is the Town Museum at the Hermannsbau. The town's history is described in its historical rooms. There is also a section covering the history of the Jewish community in Memmingen, whose members were killed or forced into exile in 1939. Part of the Torah from the destroyed synagogue is on display there. The Freudenthal/Altvater Homeland Museum for refugees who have settled in Memmingen is also part of the town museum. It is one of 43 homeland museums recognised by the Ministry of the Interior. A foundation, founded and administered by the town, takes responsibility for the museum. The Strigel- and Antoniter-Museum at the Antonierkloster present wood carvings and paintings by the Strigel family of artists as well as a permanent exhibition on the work of the Hospital Brothers of St. Anthony. The museum was established in 1996. With donations from the Memminger Wohnungsbaugenossenschaft (MeWo) the MEWO-Kunsthalle was opened in 2005 in the old post office next to the station. The museum holds the estates of the Memmingen artists Max Unold and Josef Madlener and presents a wide selection of contemporary art exhibitions. The size and scope of this art gallery is unique in region. The former Kreuzherren monastery is used for changing exhibitions.

=== Music ===
The organ concerts in the churches of St. Martins and St. Josef are famous in the region. Chamber music would be performed in the former Kreuzherren monastery and also in some other buildings in Memmingen.

There are several pubs, restaurants, wine taverns and cafés and also some discothèques in and around the town. The cultural centre Kaminwerk (Chimney factory) is for concerts, theatre, program cinema, readings and special parties.

=== Buildings ===
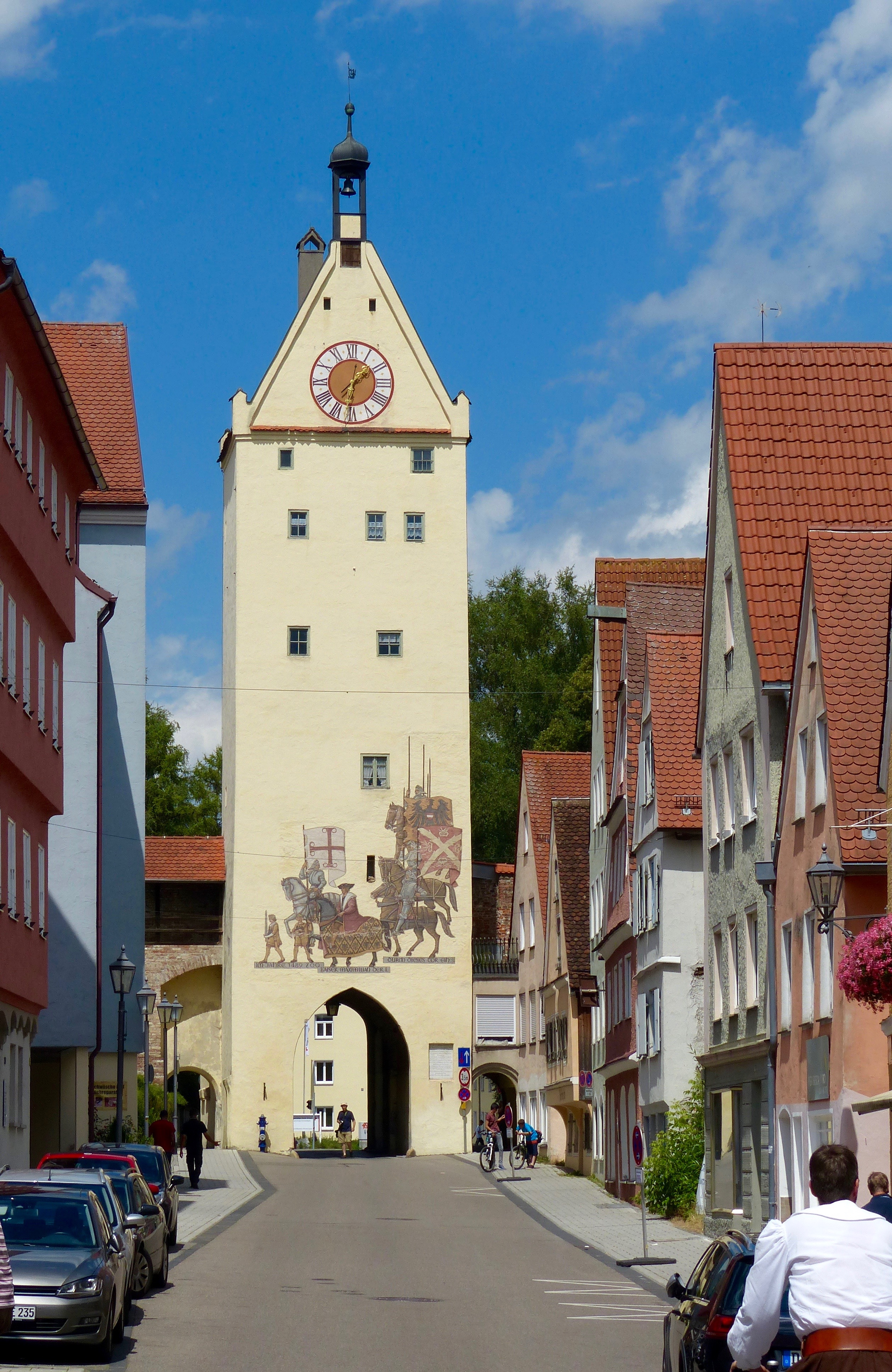
The Ulmer gate

Memmingen has considerable tourist interest, mainly because large areas of the medieval old town survived World War II. There are ten town gates and towers and about two kilometres of the town wall. The old town contains many interesting houses of patricians, some in the baroque style. They are picturesque Streets with the Stadtbach (town river) beside. The medieval market place, surrounded by the town hall, which is built in renaissance style, the Großzunft (Guildhouse) and the painted Steuerhaus (tax house). Also famous is St. Martin's church, built in gothic style with its more-than-500-year-old Choir and the 1996 restored Hospital Brothers of St. Anthony monastery (Antonierkloster), the oldest, best conserved and biggest of these kind. The probably oldest church in town Unser Frauen (Church of Our Lady) or also called Frauenkirche with significant frescos of the 15th and 16th centuries. Also the Seven Roof House, the baroque Kreuzherren monastery, the renovated whorehouse of the town, the Salzstadel (salt barn), the Kramerzunft (shopkeepers guild, also called the Twelve-Article-House are sights in Memmingen). Not so well known is the Bismarck tower in the west of Memmingen. Beside the tower is the 2007 build new soccer stadium.

=== Parks ===
Green areas were created all along the town wall. The old ditches were filled in and replaced with green areas or parks with partially over 150-year-old trees. The names of the parks are (starting clockwise at the Ulmer Gate): Hubergarten, Zollergarten, Ratzengraben/Zollergraben, Kohlschanze, Reichshain, Kaisergraben, Hohe Wacht, Westertorplatz, Grimmelschanze. Nearby every residential area has its own smaller park. There is also the town park in the New World, the old Landesgartenschau place. Also the old and the forest cemetery, which are both used as parks.

=== Cemeteries ===
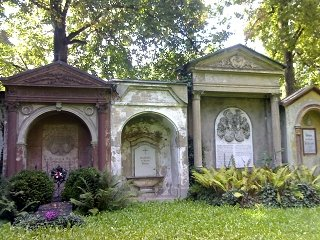
Old cemetery

There were four cemeteries in Memmingen in the Middle Ages. They were around the St. Martin's Church and the Church of Our Lady, also at the Kreuzherren monastery and the Scottish monastery. They were abandoned in 1530. The replacement was the Old cemetery at the former Scottish monastery. This cemetery was abandoned in 1930. The closing of the Old Cemetery has involved a new Cemetery. It was founded in the east of Memmingen as a Forest Cemetery. More cemeteries are in the districts Amendingen, Steinheim, Buxach, Volkratshofen, Ferthofen and Dickenreishausen. In the east of the town is also a Jewish cemetery.

== Twin towns – sister cities ==
Memmingen is twinned with:

- Glendale, United States (1976)
- Province of Teramo, Italy (1981)
- Teramo, Italy (1986)
- Auch, France (1990)
- Eisleben, Germany (1990)
- Kiryat Shmona, Israel (2009)
- Karataş, Turkey (2009)
- Litzelsdorf, Austria (2009)
- Chernihiv, Ukraine (2009)

=== Friendly cities ===
Memmingen also has friendly relations with:

- Colmar, France (1965)

== Notable people ==
- Bernhard Walther (1430–1504), merchant, humanist and astronomer
- Bernhard Strigel (1461–1528), portrait and historical painter
- Johann Heiss (1640–1704), painter
- Gertrud Otto (1895–1970), art historian
- Franz Roth (born 1946), footballer
- Heinrich Bedford-Strohm (born 1960), Lutheran bishop
- Holger Badstuber (born 1989), footballer
- Timo Gebhart (born 1989), footballer
- Sergejs Boldaveško (born 1970), hockey player
- Mario Götze (born 1992), footballer
- Andreas Mayer (born 1995), politician
