= Johann Heiss =

German painter (1640–1704)

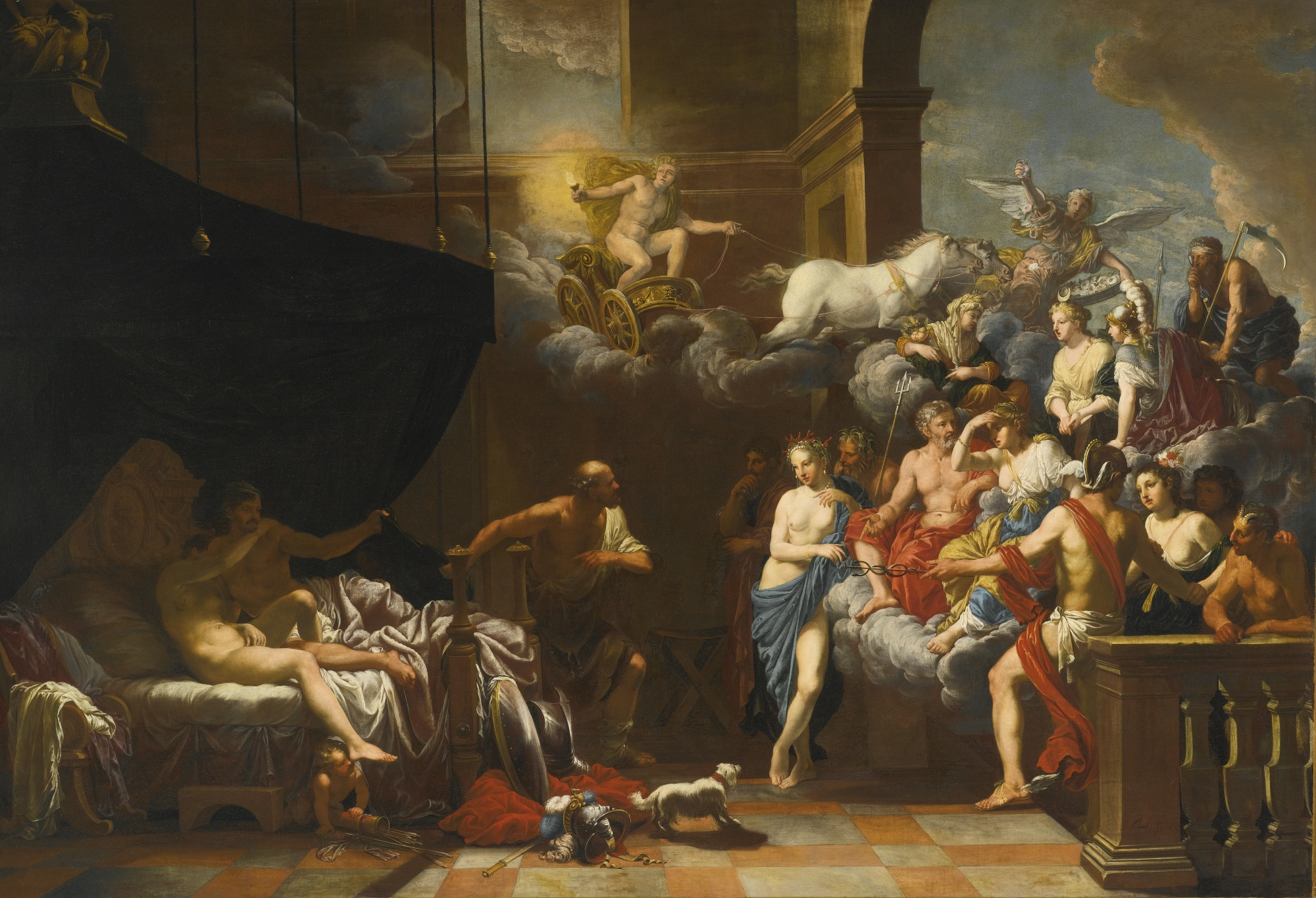
Vulcan surprising Venus and Mars

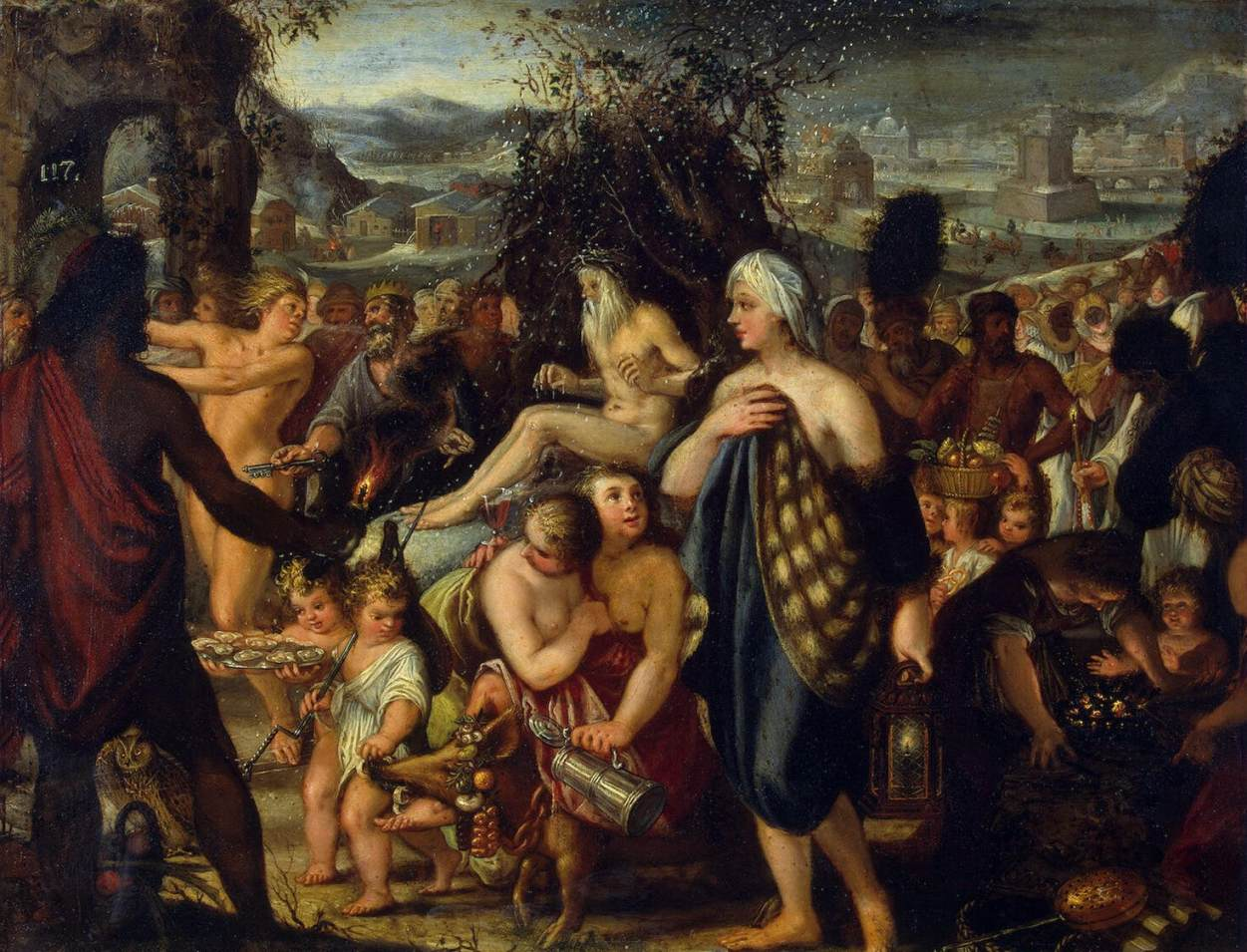
Allegory of Winter

Johann Heiss, or Heiß (19 June 1640 – February 1704) was a German painter in the Baroque style, known for historical, Biblical and mythological scenes.

== Life and work ==
Heiss was born in Memmingen in 1640. His artistic training took place in Memmingen, under the tutelage of the Sichelbein brothers; Johann Conrad (1581–1669) and Johann (1589–1670). After completing his studies, in 1663, he went to Stuttgart and was in the service of Eberhard III, Duke of Württemberg. In 1675, his works were praised by the art historian Joachim von Sandrart in his book, the Teutsche Academie. After 1677, he lived and worked in Augsburg. While there, he came under the influence of Johann Heinrich Schönfeld.

His works may be seen in museums throughout Germany, as well as at the Louvre, the Kunsthistorisches Museum (Vienna), the Hermitage and the Milwaukee Art Museum.

On site works include altarpieces at the Pilgrimage Church in Grafrath, a cycle on the Crucifixion at the Benedictine monastery in Ochsenhausen and an allegory of Abundantia at the Merkantilmagistrat in Bolzano.

His work Manus Dei, made famous due to a forgery of it by Wolfgang Beltracchi that was displayed in the Szépművészeti Múzeum, is now considered lost.

== Sources ==
- Wenzel, Carola (2003). "Heiss, Johann". Grove Art Online.
