= Bernhard Strigel =

German portrait and historical painter (c. 1461 – 1528)

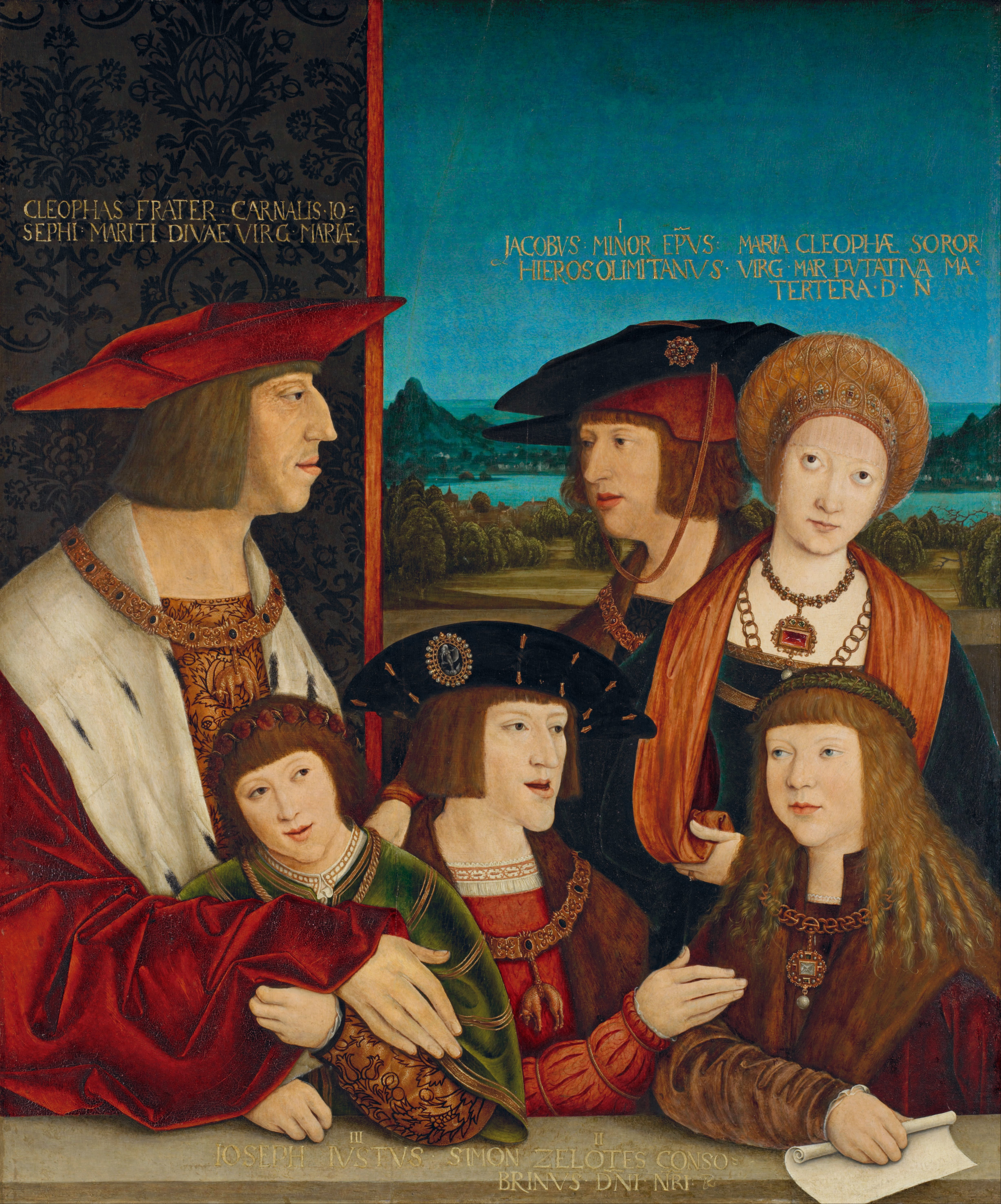
Emperor Maximilian I and his family, Bernhard Strigel

Bernhard Strigel (c. 1461 – 4 May 1528) was a German portrait and historical painter of the Swabian school, the most important of a family of artists established at Memmingen. He was born at Memmingen and was probably a pupil of Zeitblom at Ulm. Strigel stood in high favor with the Emperor Maximilian I, in whose service he repeatedly journeyed to Augsburg, Innsbruck, and Vienna.

His religious paintings, which include four altar wings with scenes from the Life of the Virgin, in the Berlin Gallery, and 10 paintings illustrating the Genealogy of Christ, in the Germanic Museum, Nuremberg, are historically interesting, but of less artistic value than his portraits, which, though detailed, are ably handled and luminous in color. Notable examples are those of Conrad Rehlinger, lord of Hainhofen (1517), Alte Pinakothek, Munich; "Councilor Cuspinian and Family," (1520), Berlin Museum; Count John of Montfort, at Donaueschingen; An Unknown Lady, Metropolitan Museum, New York; and portraits of Emperor Maximilian in the Strassburg, Munich, and Vienna galleries. In Madrid at the Thyssen-Bornemisza Museum three of his Works can be seen, one "Portrait of a man" (1528) and a pair of religious paintings The annunciation to St. Anne (1505–1510) and The Virgin of the Annunciation, also called The Angel of the Annunciation (1515–1520). The Royal Academy of Saint Fernando holds a copy on canvas of Strigel's famous work of Emperor Maximilian I and his family.
