= Sergejs Boldaveško =

Latvian ice hockey player

- Born: October 9, 1970 (age 56) Rīga, Latvian SSR, Soviet Union
- Height: 5 ft 8 in (173 cm)
- Weight: 168 lb (76 kg; 12 st 0 lb)
- Position: Forward
- Shot: Right
- Played for: Dinamo Riga; Stars Riga; HK Pārdaugava Rīga; Augsburger Panther; Vojens IK; HK Liepājas Metalurgs
- National team: Latvia
- Playing career: 1986–2008

Sergejs Boldaveško (born October 9, 1970 in Rīga, Latvian SSR, Soviet Union) is a retired Latvian ice hockey forward, who played for Dinamo Riga later HK Pārdaugava Rīga of the Soviet Hockey League, Liepājas Metalurgs and various German regional teams. He also was a part of Latvian national team during its resurrection after fall of Soviet Union.
