= Fischertag =

Festival held in Memmingen, Germany

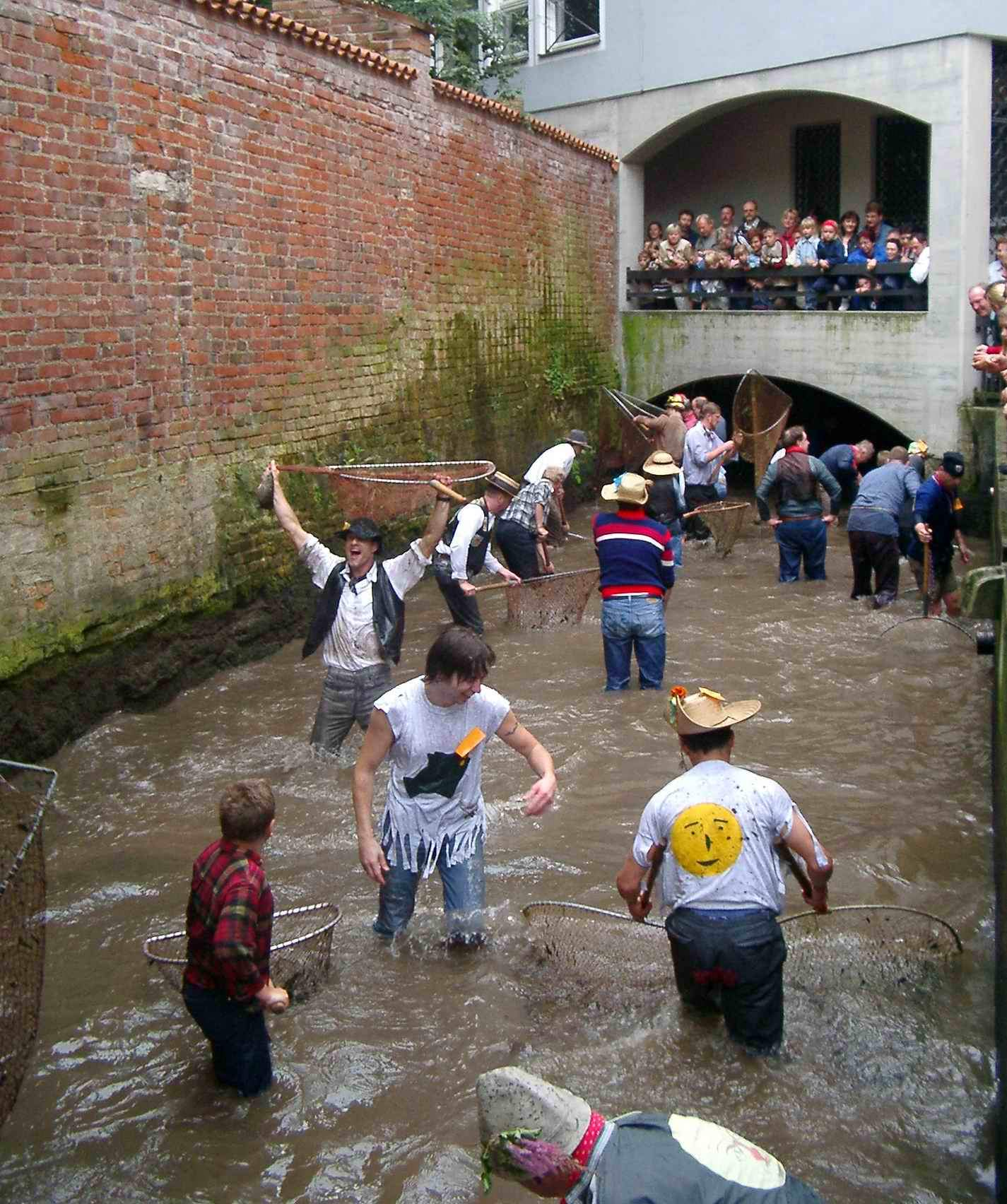
Fishermen fishing out the creek at the Einlaß

The Fischertag (German pronunciation: [ˈfɪʃɐˌtaːk], lit. 'Fishermen's Day') is a traditional festival of the town of Memmingen, Germany. The town creek is fished out to be drained and cleaned, and at the same time the "Fisherman's king" is determined among almost 1,200 fishermen. Every year 30,000 to 40,000 people come to the festival as participants or spectators.

== History ==
The Fishermen's Day has its origins in the Middle Ages. Since 1465 the people of Memmingen have been fishing the town stream empty every year. Until 1955, the Fishermen's Day took place around "Bartholomä" day (24 August). Since 1955 it takes place (together with the children's festival) in the last week before the school summer holidays.

In former times the Memminger Ach served as irrigation and drainage system for the craftsmen. The tanners in particular needed the water to process the skins. At the same time, the stream was used to dispose of tannery waste, faeces and the remains from the slaughterhouses. Once a year it was drained to remove the rubbish from the stream bed and to renovate the bridges. Alternating between the guilds, the apprentices were allowed to fish the brook empty every year since the 16th century.

Around the turn of the century the festival was reorganised. This included the founding of the Fischertagsverein Memmingen e.V., to which the city entrusted the organisation of the Fischertag in 1919. Since 1980, the association is also organising the Wallenstein Festival for one week as the "Great Fisherman's Day" every four years in addition to the Fisherman's Day.

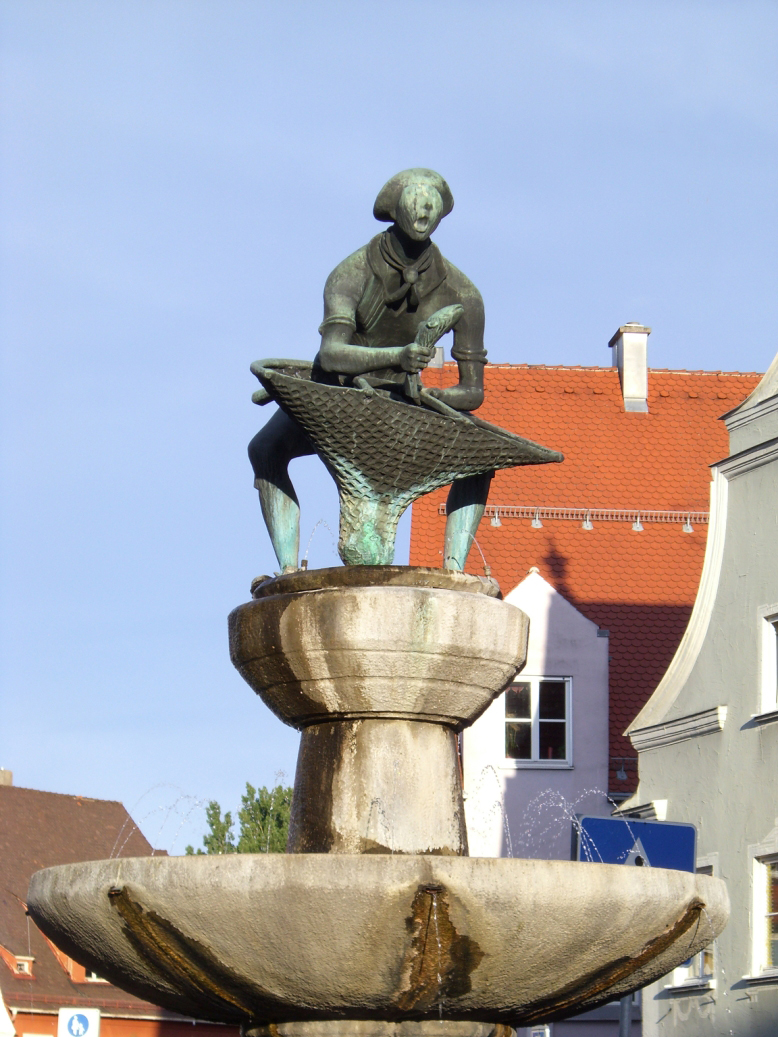
The Fisherman's Fountain at the Schrannenplatz

== Festival Schedule ==
The focus of the festival is fishing out the creek. On the evening before the Fishermen's Day at 18:00 the "Stadtbüttel" (bailiff), together with the "Stadtgarde" (historic city guards) in traditional costumes, announces the Fishermen's Day. A parade then leads through the old town to the Schrannenplatz, where the sculpture on the Fischerbrunnen (fisherman's fountain) is dressed. Until the early hours of the morning, the town's lanes and pubs are the scene of celebrations. Meanwhile, the night watchman walks through the old town with his sharp servants on the historic night watchman's path. Between three and six o'clock the hustle and bustle is ended by the closing hour.

Already from 6 o'clock in the morning the fishermen meet in the schoolyard in front of the Westertor. Every fisherman has to stamp his fishing card there. The fishermen's parade then departs at 7 am from there, accompanied by numerous chapels, through the streets to the Schrannenplatz. Here the head fisherman reads his poem, referring to what happened in the city during the last year, on a huge wooden barrel and. At about 7:50 a.m. the fishermen hurry to their place at the town stream.

The "Kübelesträger" (bucket carrier, most often the fisherman's wife) is the most important person next to the fisherman and is responsible for ensuring that the bucket for the caught fish is sufficiently filled with water. At eight o'clock the fishermen "jucken" (jump) into the town stream after a saluting gun shot and start fishing.

The goal of every fisherman is to catch at least one of the trouts. The fishermen and the spectators cheer a lot every time a trout is caught by someone. In order to preserve the centuries-old tradition, all fishermen must be born in Memmingen or have been registered with their first residence in the town for 5 years and be members of the Fischertagsverein. Furthermore, the participants must be in possession of the state fishing licence or have attended the association's internal fishing course and must behave appropriately when fishing. Fishing is only allowed with a stamped fishing card on the hat. Numerous supervisors pay attention to this.

The heaviest trout is determined at the scales in front of the Grand Guild on the market place and at the Frauenkirche. The fisherman that caught it will be crowned new fisherman's king in the city's stadium hall in the following "Königsfrühschoppen" (morning pint). His predecessor is deposed by kicking his ass with a loaf of bread, a radish and a glass of beer. The new Fisherman's King is then carried to the stage by the City Guard and a group of fishermen where he takes his seat on the birch throne. In addition, six fishermen with particularly beautiful clothing are selected in the morning and then awarded prizes here. In the evening at 18 o'clock the new fisher king is introduced to the spectators at another parade. In honour of the Fisher King, the Fishermen's Evening takes place, where various groups entertain the spectators with music and dance. During the festival, the Fishermen's Day Theatre is held in the Municipal Theatre.

The traditional fisherman's day song, the "Schmotzmarsch", reads: "Schmotz, schmotz, Dreck auf Dreck, Schellakönig, wüaschte Sau!". It was composed in 1903 by Mr. Ostermayer, the city's capellmeister at the time.

Every four years, the Wallenstein Festival begins in the city on the Sunday after the Fishermen's Day. That festival is regarded as the largest historical festival in Europe.
