= List of Bugatti vehicles =

This is a list of vehicles produced by Bugatti (under Ettore Bugatti), Bugatti Automobili S.p.A., and Bugatti Automobiles.

== Automobiles Ettore Bugatti (1909-1963) ==
=== Production cars ===
- 1910 Type 13
- 1912–1914 Type 18
- 1913–1914 Type 23/Brescia Tourer (roadster)
- 1922–1934 Type 30/38/40/43/44/49 (touring car)
- 1927–1933 Type 41 "Royale"
- 1929–1939 Type 46/50/50T (touring car)
- 1932–1935 Type 55 (roadster)
- 1934–1940 Type 57/57S/Type 57SC (touring car)
- 1951–1956 Type 101 (coupe)

=== Race cars ===
- 1910–1914 Type 13/Type 15/17/22
- 1912 Peugeot Bébé Built by Bugatti under license from Peugeot. Known as Bugatti Type 16/Peugeot Type 69 and BP1
- 1922–1926 Type 29 "Cigare"
- 1923 Type 32 "Tank"
- 1924–1930 Type 35/35A/35B/35T/35C/37/39 "Grand Prix"
- 1927–1930 Type 52 (electric racer for children)
- 1936–1939 Type 57G "Tank"
- 1937–1939 Type 50B
- 1931–1936 Type 53
- 1931–1936 Type 51/51A/54GP/59
- 1955–1956 Type 251

=== Prototypes ===
- 1899 Type 1
- 1900–1901 Type 2
- 1903 Type 5
- 1908 Type 10 "Petit Pur Sang"
- 1925 Type 36
- 1929–1930 Type 45/47
- Type 56 (electric car)
- 1939 Type 64 (coupe)
- 1939 Bugatti Model 100
- 1943/1947 Type 73C
- 1957–1962 Type 252 (2-seat sports convertible)

== Bugatti Automobili S.p.A. (1987–1995) ==
- 1991–1995 Bugatti EB 110
- 1993 Bugatti EB 112 (Concept)

== Bugatti Automobiles S.A.S. (1998–present) ==
=== Production cars ===
- 2005–2015 Bugatti Veyron
- 2016–2024 Bugatti Chiron
  - 2019–2021 Bugatti Divo
  - 2019 Bugatti La Voiture Noire
  - 2022 Bugatti Centodieci
  - 2026 Bugatti F.K.P. Hommage
- 2023–2025 Bugatti Mistral
  - 2025 Bugatti Brouillard
- 2024–2025 Bugatti Bolide
  - 2026 Bugatti Destrier
- 2026 Bugatti Tourbillon

=== Prototypes ===
- 1998 Bugatti EB 118
- 1999 Bugatti EB 218
- 1999 Bugatti 18/3 Chiron
- 2009 Bugatti 16C Galibier "Royale"
- 2015 Bugatti Vision Gran Turismo
- 2015 Bugatti Atlantic
- 2020 Bugatti Vision Le Mans
- 2020 Bugatti W16 GT "Rembrandt"
