= Bugatti EB 112 =

Concept car developed by Bugatti Automobili in 1993

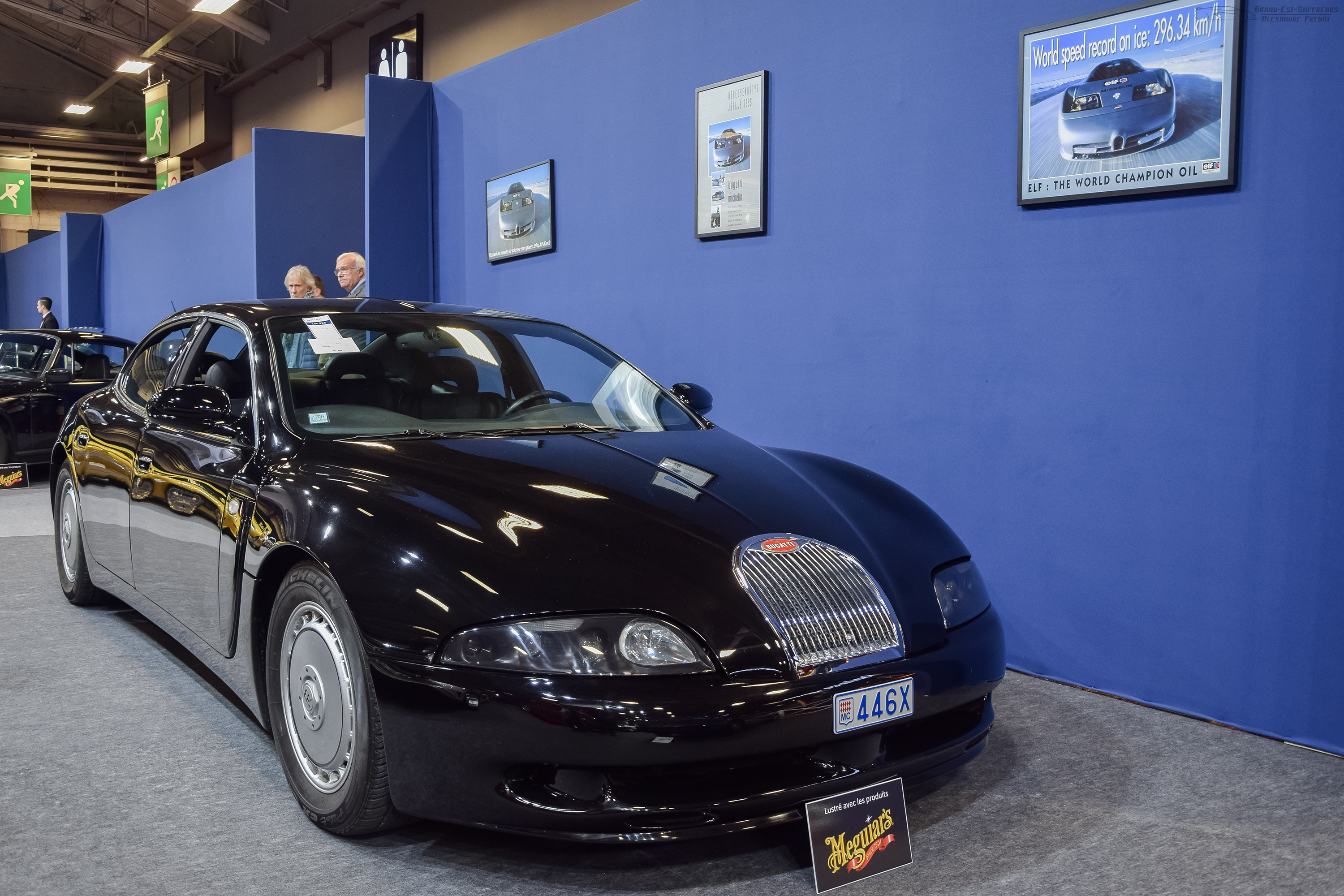

Overview
- Manufacturer: Bugatti Automobili S.p.A.
- Production: 1993 (first prototype); 1998 (later examples) 3 produced
- Assembly: Italy: Modena (first prototype); Monaco (later examples)
- Designer: Giorgetto Giugiaro at Italdesign

Body and chassis
- Class: Concept full-size luxury car (F)
- Body style: 4-door fastback saloon
- Layout: Front-engine all-wheel-drive
- Related: Bugatti EB 110; Bugatti EB 118

Powertrain
- Engine: 6.0 L Bugatti V12
- Transmission: 6-speed manual

Dimensions
- Wheelbase: 3,100 mm (122.0 in)
- Length: 5,070 mm (199.6 in)
- Width: 1,960 mm (77.2 in)
- Height: 1,405 mm (55.3 in)
- Kerb weight: 1,800 kg (3,968 lb)

Chronology
- Predecessor: Bugatti Type 57
- Successor: Bugatti EB 218

The Bugatti EB 112 is a concept 4-door fastback saloon presented by Bugatti Automobili S.p.A. in 1993. Giorgetto Giugiaro of Italdesign was responsible for designing the car. The EB 112 features a 456 PS (335 kW; 450 hp) V12 engine and permanent four-wheel drive system.

== Design ==
Bugatti S.p.A. commissioned Giorgetto Giugiaro of Italdesign to create a full-size saloon version of the EB 110 sports car. The result was the EB 112, which was a retro-styled four-door fastback saloon reminiscent of older Bugatti models, such as the well-known Type 57 Galibier. The body was made entirely of aluminium, with a carbon-fibre chassis shared with the EB 110.

== Powertrain ==
Power comes from a V12 engine generating a power output of 456 PS (335 kW; 450 hp) and 479 lb⋅ft (649 N⋅m) of torque. The engine featured 5 valves per cylinder, and has a displacement of 6.0-litres opposed to the EB110's 3.5-litres. The engine is placed behind the front wheels, more towards the center of the car inside of the wheelbase to have a much better weight distribution. The EB 112 features permanent all-wheel drive. The car can accelerate from 0–100 km/h (62 mph) in 4.3 seconds and has a claimed top speed of 300 km/h (186 mph).

== Production ==
Bugatti debuted the EB 112 in March 1993, at the Geneva Motor Show. It received mixed reviews due to its unconventional design. However, Automobile magazine had named the car "The most beautiful car in the world" when it was introduced.

Since the Bugatti EB 112 was a concept car, the development was undertaken in the factory and the show car was completed on the assembly line. When Bugatti Automobili S.p.A. went bankrupt in 1995, some assets of the company were purchased by businessman Gildo Pallanca Pastor. The assets included spare parts and three unfinished EB 112 saloons. Two of those were completed in 1998 by his firm Monaco Racing Team located in Monaco. One car was finished in Black exterior colour and the other was finished in Anthracite colour. Each of the three cars are slightly different, as the red car has bumper integrated taillights opposed to having them placed above the rear bumper on the other cars. The blue design study (repainted in the same red as the working prototype) differs from the others because it has more aerodynamic enhancements, such as a subtle front splitter and a rear lip spoiler just below the rear window.

The EB 112 had several cars meant to be an evolution of its 4-door design. The first is the EB 218, with a W18 engine and larger dimensions. The second was the 16C Galibier, a concept luxury saloon conceived and developed in 2009.

== Owners ==
A black EB 112 (s/n 39003), once owned by Gildo Pallanca Pastor, the current CEO and owner of the French car company Venturi, was spotted being driven around in Monaco in 2013. The car was sold to Marc Gindorf, a German collector in Monaco in 2016. The first working prototype (red, s/n 39001) is owned by Italdesign while a third car finished in dark Anthracite exterior colour was sold to a Russian individual by Pastor's firm, Monaco Racing Team, which completed the car. Today the black EB 112 is the only car, out of the three, which is totally homologated.

The s/n 39002 was sold in 2021.

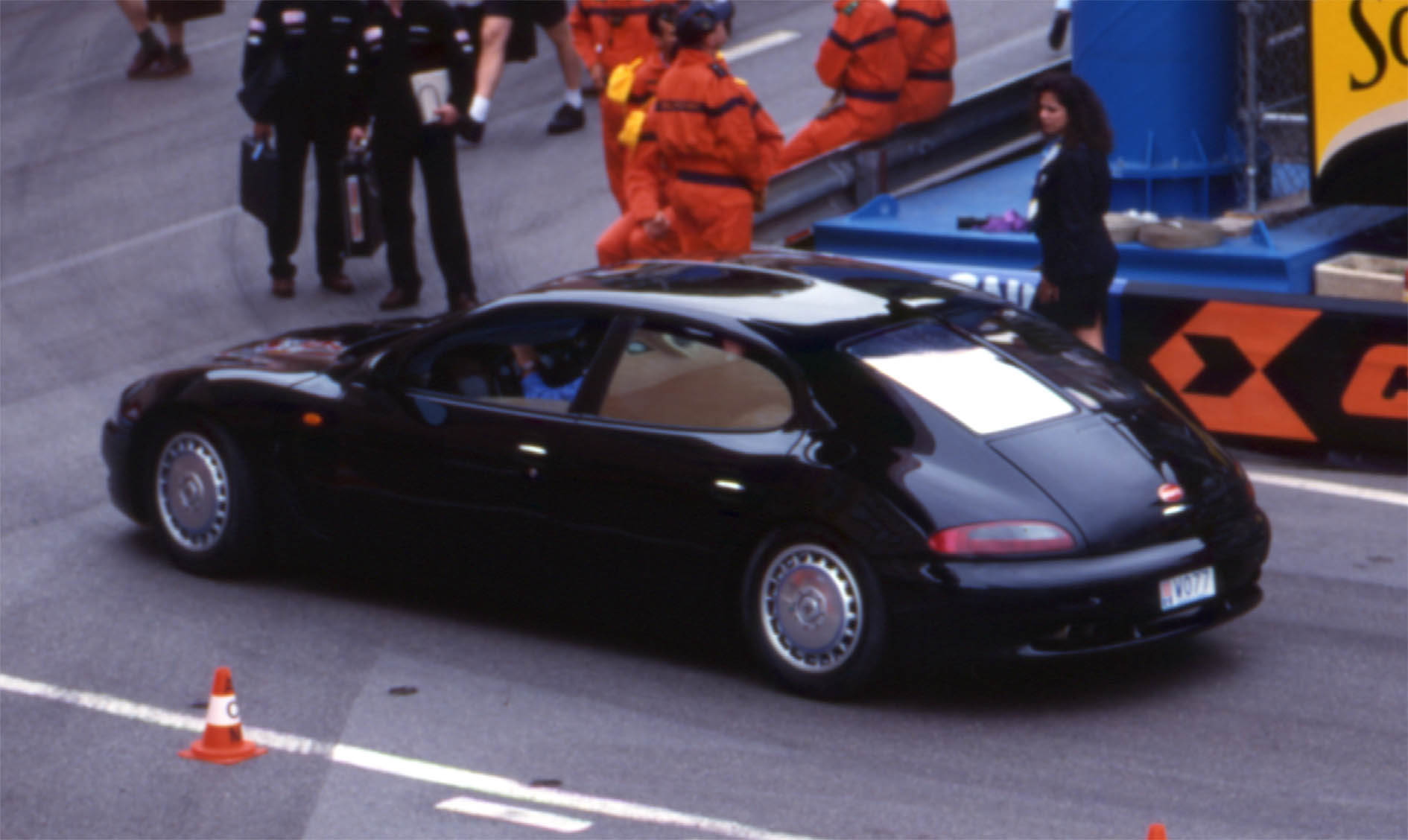
Gildo Pallanca Pastor's black EB 112 at the Monaco Grand Prix.

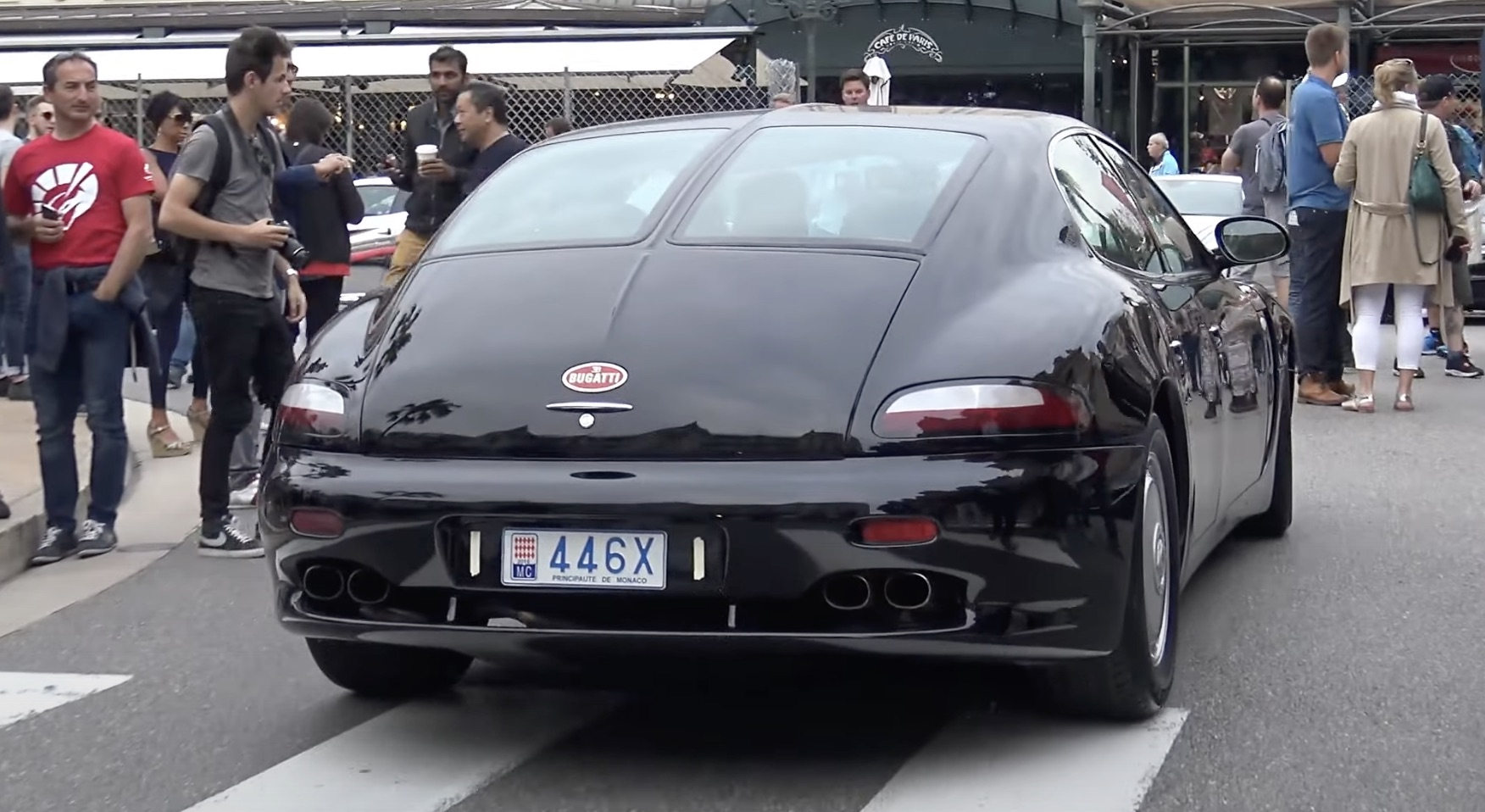
Rear view of the EB 112 in Monaco.
