= W18 engine =

Piston engine with 18 cylinders in W configuration

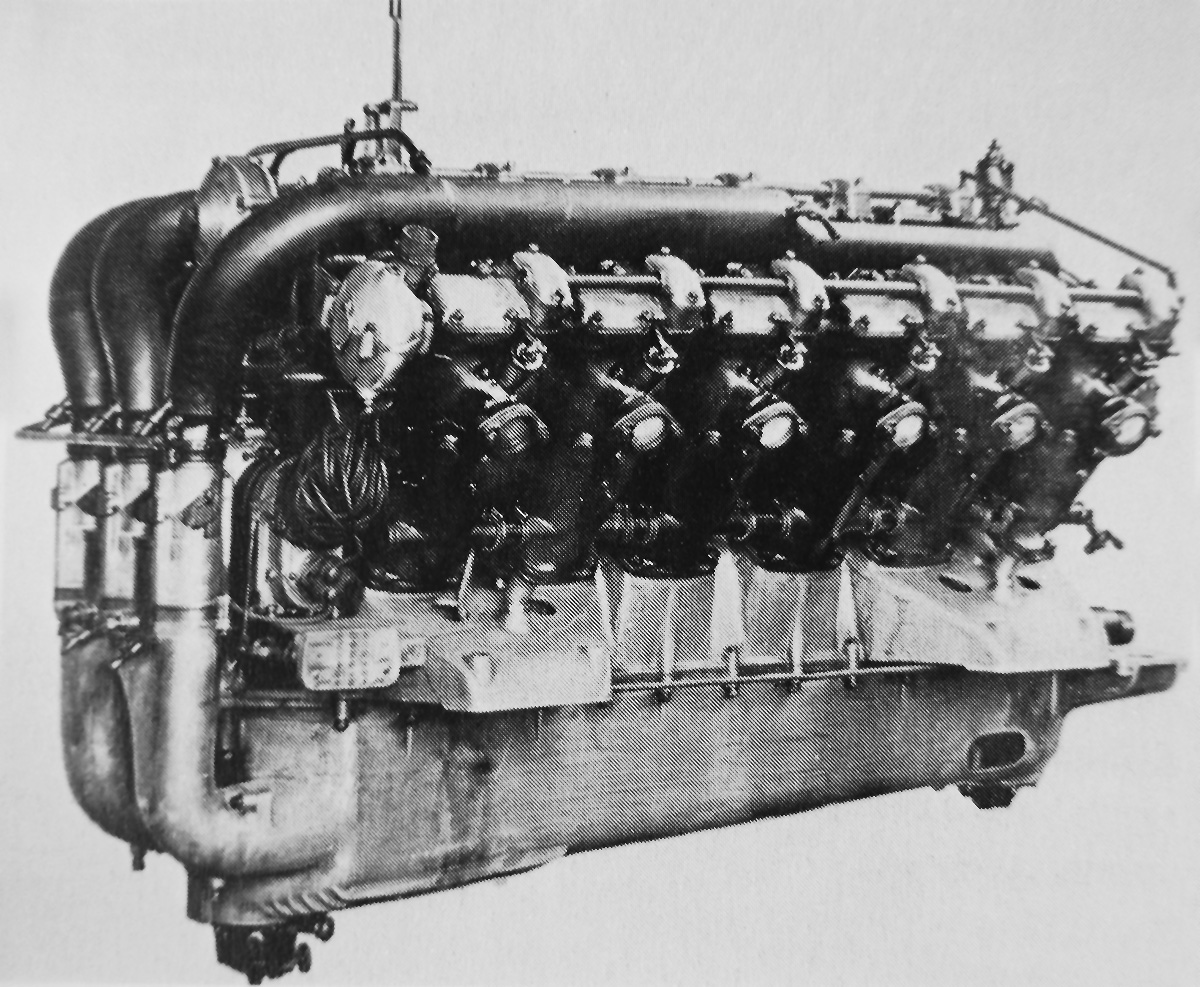
1915 Mercedes D.VI 517 hp aeroengine

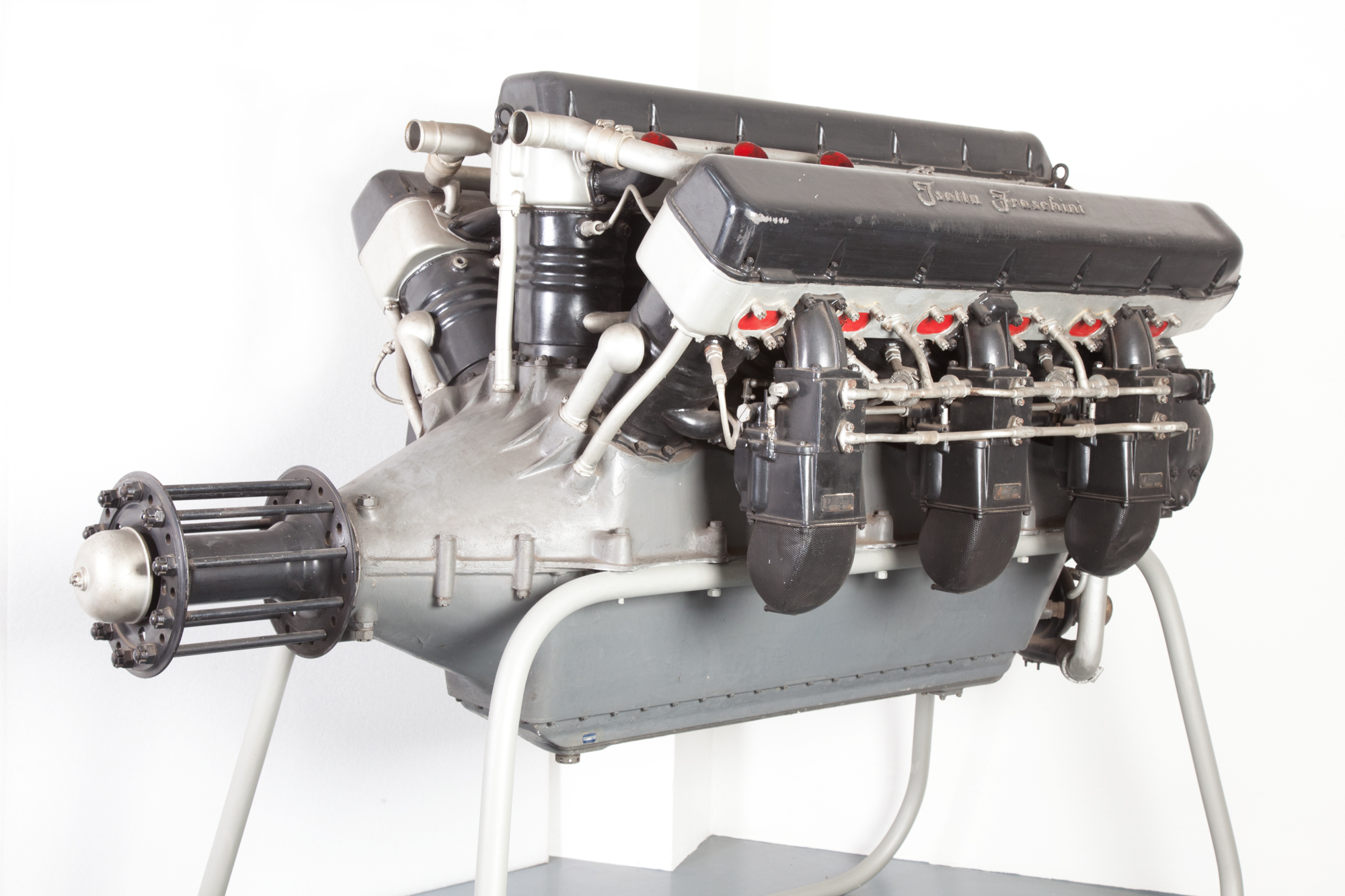
1930s Isotta Fraschini Asso 750 aircraft engine

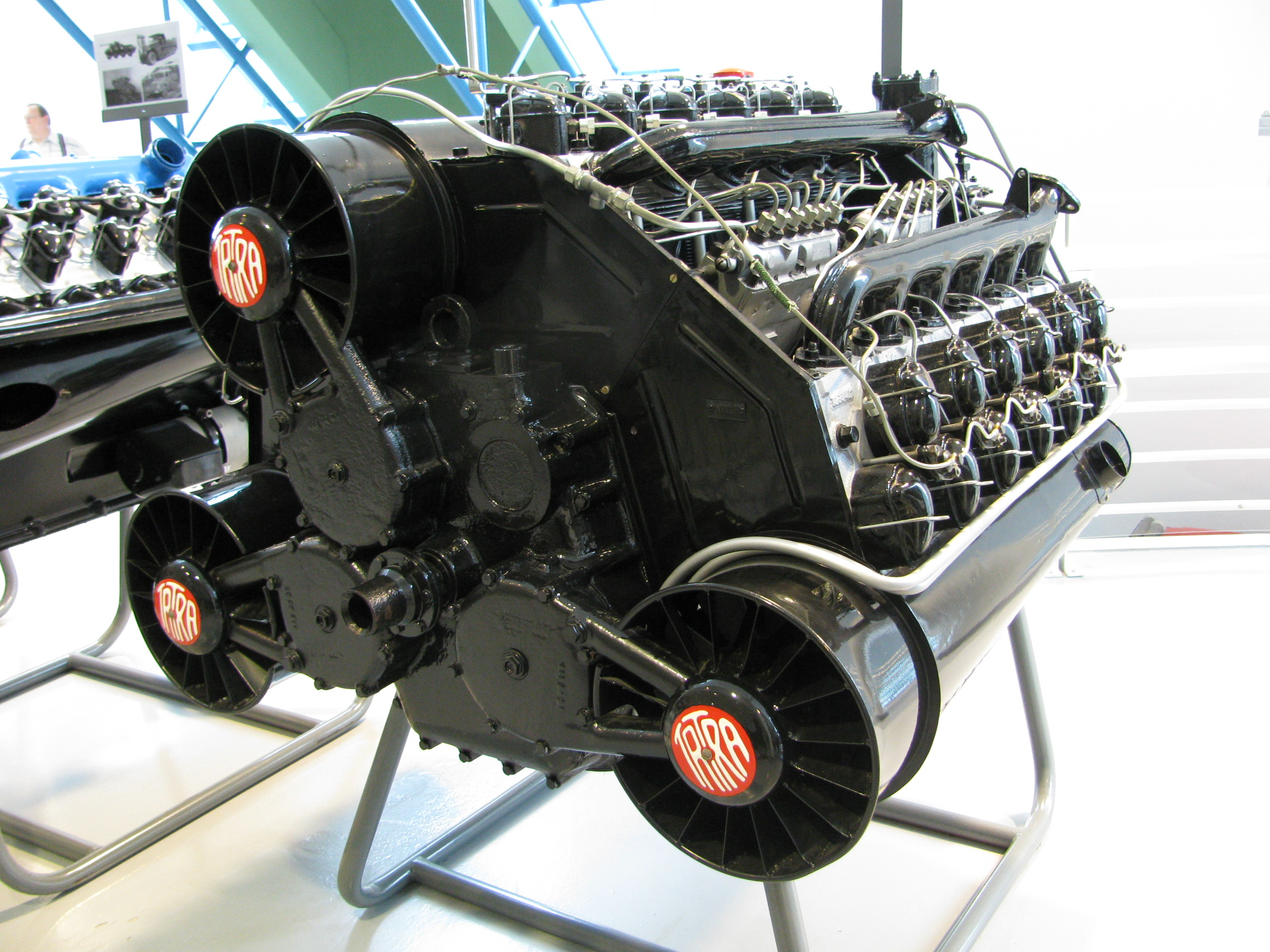
1943 Tatra T955 prototype diesel aircraft engine

A W18 engine is an eighteen-cylinder piston engine with three banks of six cylinders in a W configuration.

The W18 layout is rarely used, with the only production examples being several aircraft during the 1920s and 1930s. Prototype W18 engines were produced for concept cars predecessors to the Bugatti Veyron in the late 1990s.

== Aircraft usage ==
The first example was the German Mercedes D.VI aeroengine, which were built since 1915. A later example is the 1929 Hispano-Suiza 18R, an aircraft racing engine produced in limited quantities in France. This was followed in 1934 by the Isotta Fraschini Asso 750, which was built in Italy and used in several flying boats. The Asso 750 was water-cooled and used an angle of 60 degrees between banks. The 1943 Tatra T955 was a prototype diesel aircraft engine which used a W18 layout.

== Automotive usage ==
The W18 layout has rarely been considered for use in motor vehicles by car manufacturers, and none have reached production.

In 1967, Scuderia Ferrari built a prototype W3 engine as a feasibility study for a 3.0 L (183 cu in) W18 engine to use in Formula One.

A W18 was considered as a flagship option for the Mercedes-Benz W140 S-Class and a potential future supercar to supersede the M120 V12, which was still being developed at the time. Internally classified as the M216, it was to share many internal components with existing Mercedes-Benz inline-six engines in order to save on development and production costs. Development of the engine was halted when prototypes of the M120 engine proved satisfactory, and it was decided there was no need for a larger engine.

In the late 1990s, the Bugatti EB 118, Bugatti EB 218, Bugatti 18/3 Chiron and Bugatti EB 18/4 Veyron concept cars were fitted with W18 engines, prior to the production version of the Bugatti Veyron using a W16 engine instead.

In 2025, Porsche filed a patent for a W18 with intake manifolds atop each cylinder head. The patent also details the potential for turbocharging.

== Marine usage ==
The W18 layout has been used on the high seas; CRM Motori SpA marine engines.
