= Bugatti Type 252 =

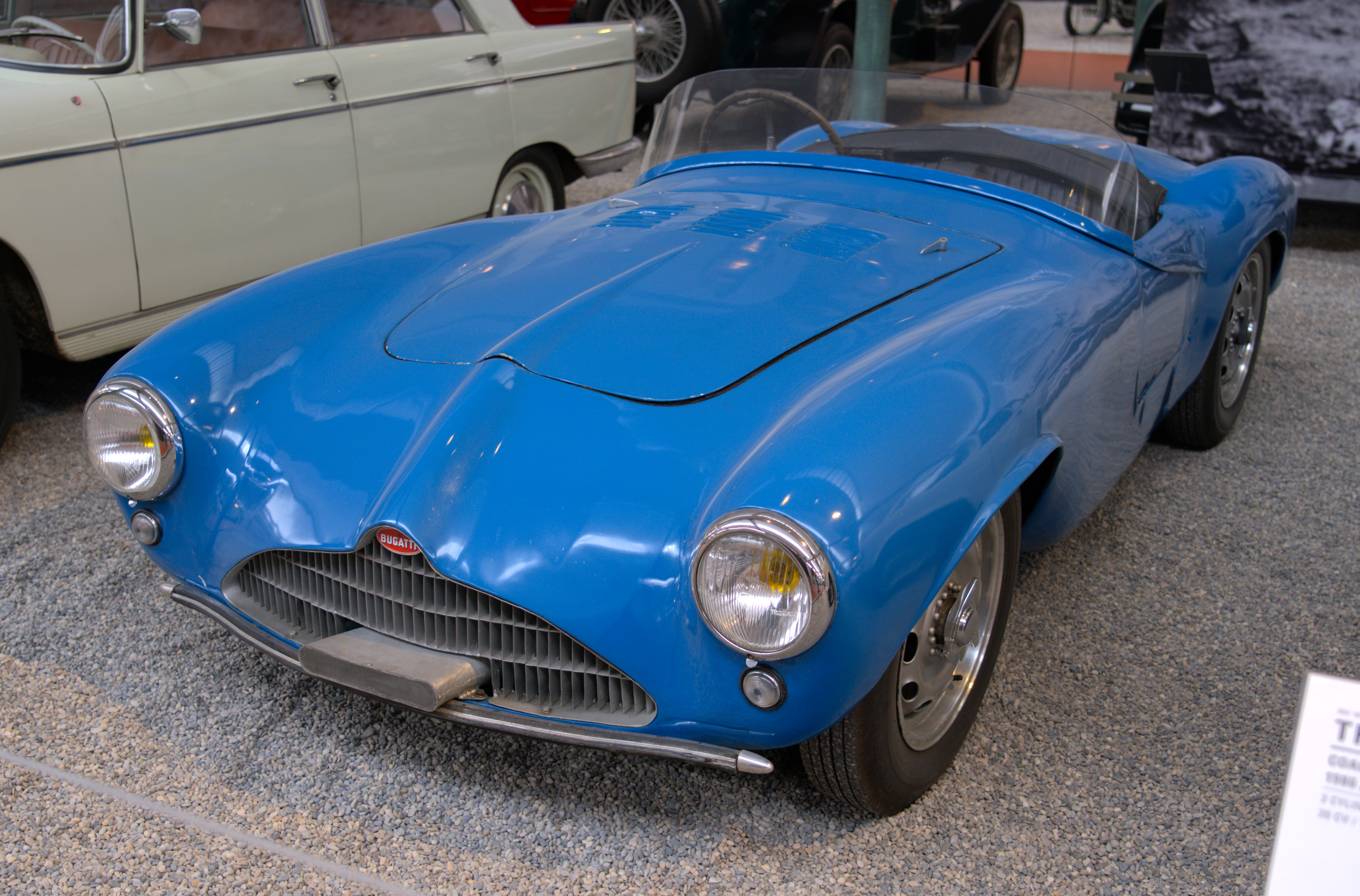
- Bugatti Type 252 - Musée de l'automobile de Mulhouse

Overview
- Manufacturer: Bugatti
- Production: 1957–1962; 1 (prototype)
- Designer: Giovanni Michelotti

Body and chassis
- Body style: 2-door convertible
- Layout: FR layout

Powertrain
- Engine: 1.5 L Inline four

The Bugatti Type 252 is a one-off sports car developed by Bugatti between 1957 and 1962. However the Bugatti Type 252 never went beyond the prototype stage. The car now resides in the Cité de l'Automobile museum in Mulhouse, France.

== History ==
Developed between 1957 and 1962, the Bugatti Type 252 was the last car proposed by the historic Bugatti brand before it was sold to Hispano-Suiza in 1963. The Bugatti Type 252 is the result of a mid-size sports car study conducted by Roland Bugatti and was designed by Giovanni Michelotti. It was reportedly pitched to multiple different investors but never was funded and remained a one-off. It is powered by a 1.5 L (1,488 cc, 76 x 82 mm) inline 4 engine with twin overhead camshafts and uses MacPherson strut suspension in the front and rear. During development, the car suffered numerous engine problems, and on test drives, driver Pierre Macoin would frequently end up broken down on the side of the road. To avoid any unwanted publicity, Bugatti decided that they would fit the prototype engine under the hood of a Bugatti Type 73 saloon. Later though, both the engine and chassis of the Type 252 were redesigned. Work on the suspension began in August 1959 and was completed in 1962, but the project was abandoned soon after.
