= Bugatti 16C Galibier =

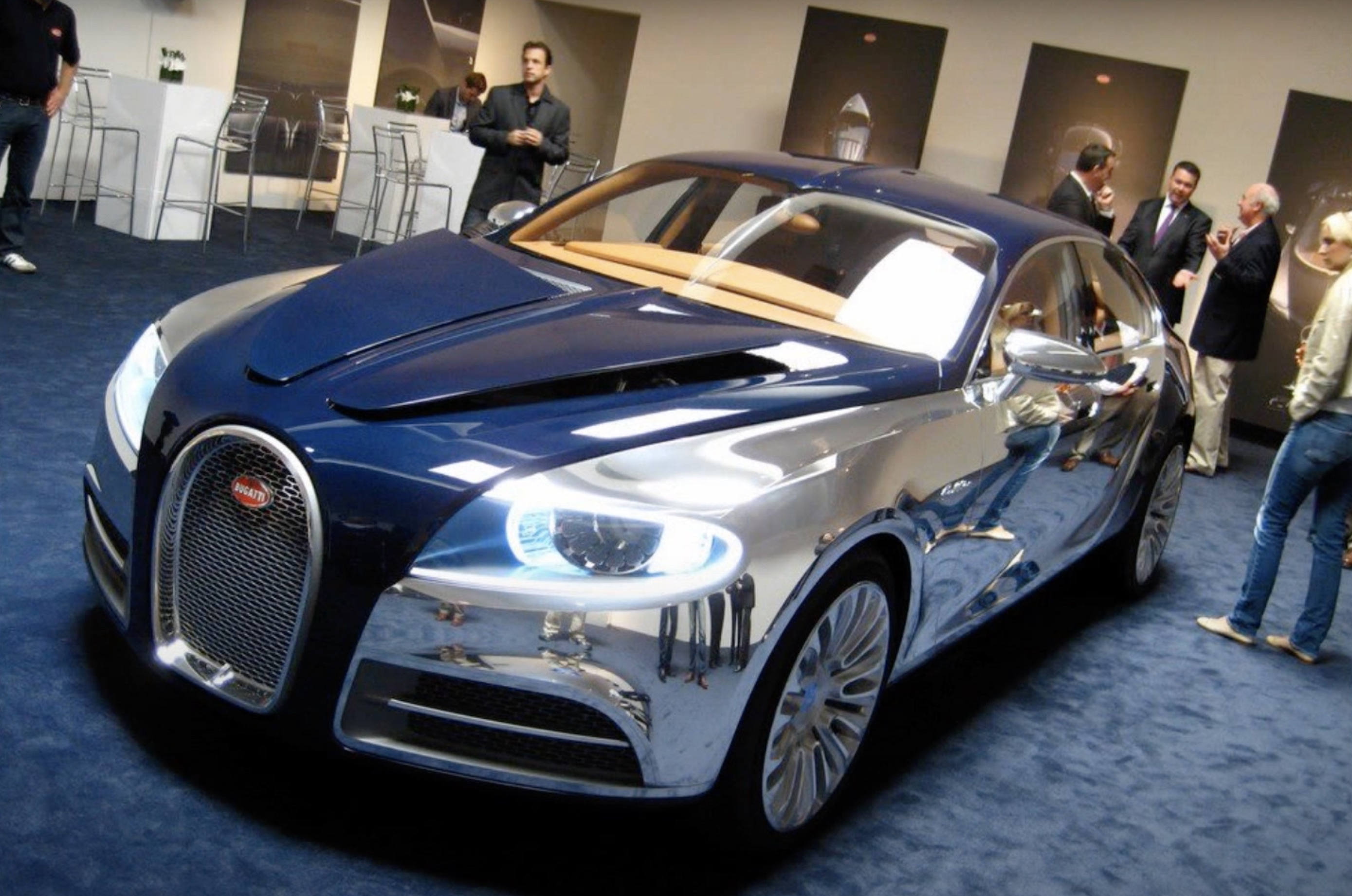
- 16C Galibier with two-part bonnet opened

Overview
- Manufacturer: Bugatti Automobiles S.A.S.
- Production: 2009
- Assembly: France: Molsheim, Alsace

Body and chassis
- Class: Concept car
- Body style: 5-door fastback sedan
- Layout: Front-engine, all-wheel drive

Powertrain
- Engine: 8.0 L twin-supercharged Volkswagen WR16
- Transmission: 8-speed ZF 8HP automatic

Chronology
- Predecessor: Bugatti EB 218

The Bugatti 16C Galibier is a luxury 5-door fastback concept car built by Bugatti Automobiles S.A.S. It was unveiled at an invitation-only show held at the Molsheim, France assembly salon on September 12, 2009. The 16C Galibier was to use a front-mounted, 8.0 L twin-supercharged W16 engine delivering power via permanent all-wheel drive. A production version of the 16C Galibier concept was initially expected to reach the market around 2014 to 2015; however in September 2013, Bugatti announced that it will be "pulling out" of the Galibier project in favour of the Veyron's successor, the Chiron.

== Name origin ==
The 16C Galibier name is a reference to the Bugatti Type 57 Galibier. Bugatti traditionally gave Type 57 variants names that referred to mountain passes. Galibier refers to France's Col du Galibier. The "16C" refers to the engine's 16 cylinders.

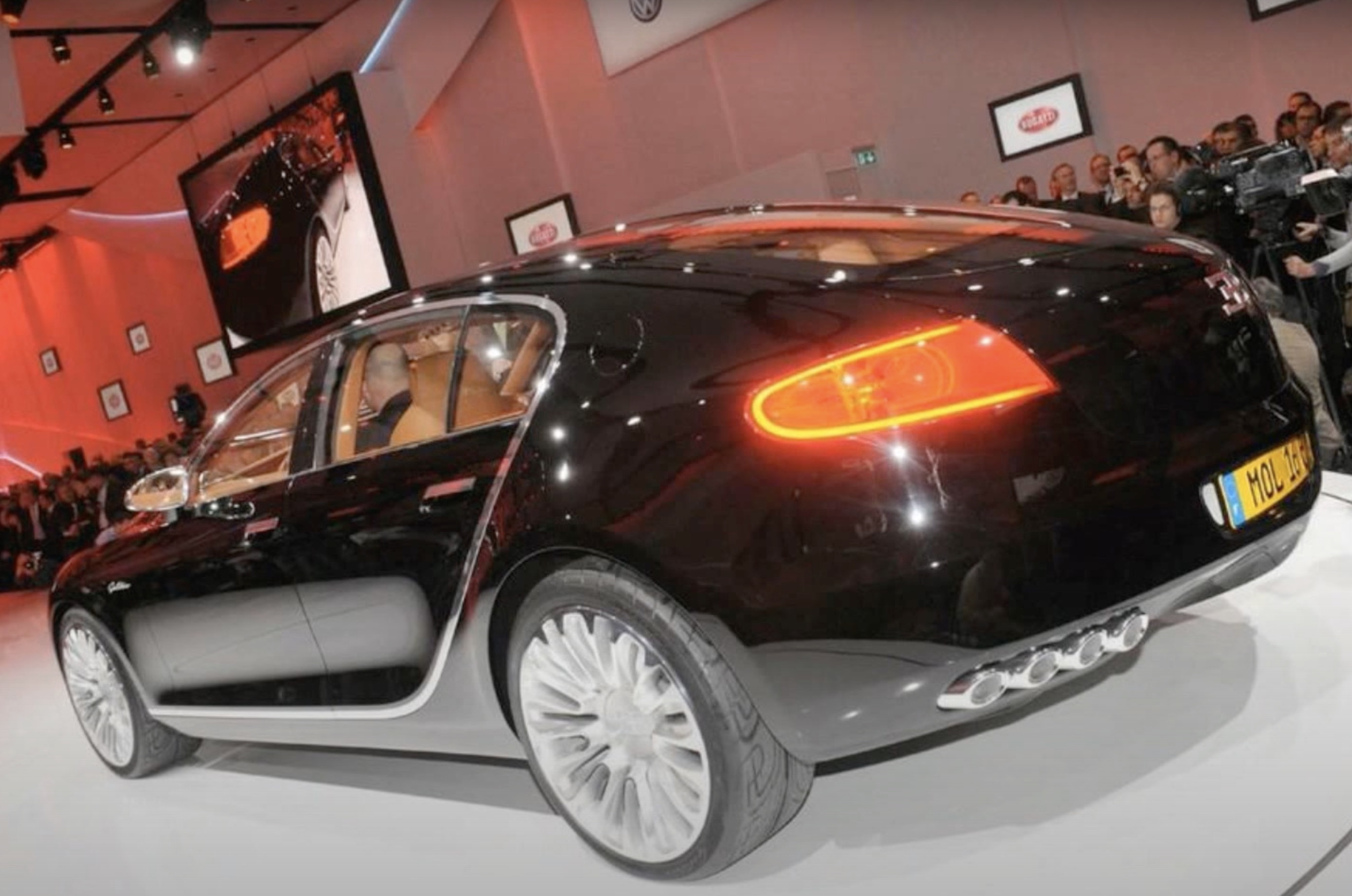
Rear side view

== Design ==
The 16C Galibier features a bonnet which opens in two parts along a central hinge. The 16C Galibier features the longitudinal rib also seen on the previous EB118 and EB218 concepts that references the longitudinal body seam of the Type 57SC Atlantic. The Gabilier would most likely have been one of if not the most luxurious cars in the world, with interior features such as an analog timepiece which can be mounted in the dash as a clock or on a wristband as a watch.

== Debut ==
Bugatti Automobiles S.A.S. debuted the Bugatti 16C Galibier 5-door fastback concept at an invitation-only show held at the Molsheim, France assembly salon on September 12, 2009. The 16C Galibier was first shown to the general public at the 2009 Frankfurt Auto Show. It was shown in two color schemes, a two-tone of dark blue and polished aluminium, and black.

== Powertrain ==
The 16C Galibier uses a front-mounted, 8.0 L twin-supercharged W16 engine that delivers power via permanent four-wheel drive. The engine is derived from the quad-turbocharged unit used in the Bugatti Veyron. An optional hybrid powertrain was considered primarily to reduce pollution in urbanised environments. Performance figures were not specified, but power output was hinted in excess of 1,000 PS (986 hp; 735 kW) while exceeding speeds of 235 mph (378 km/h).

== Production ==
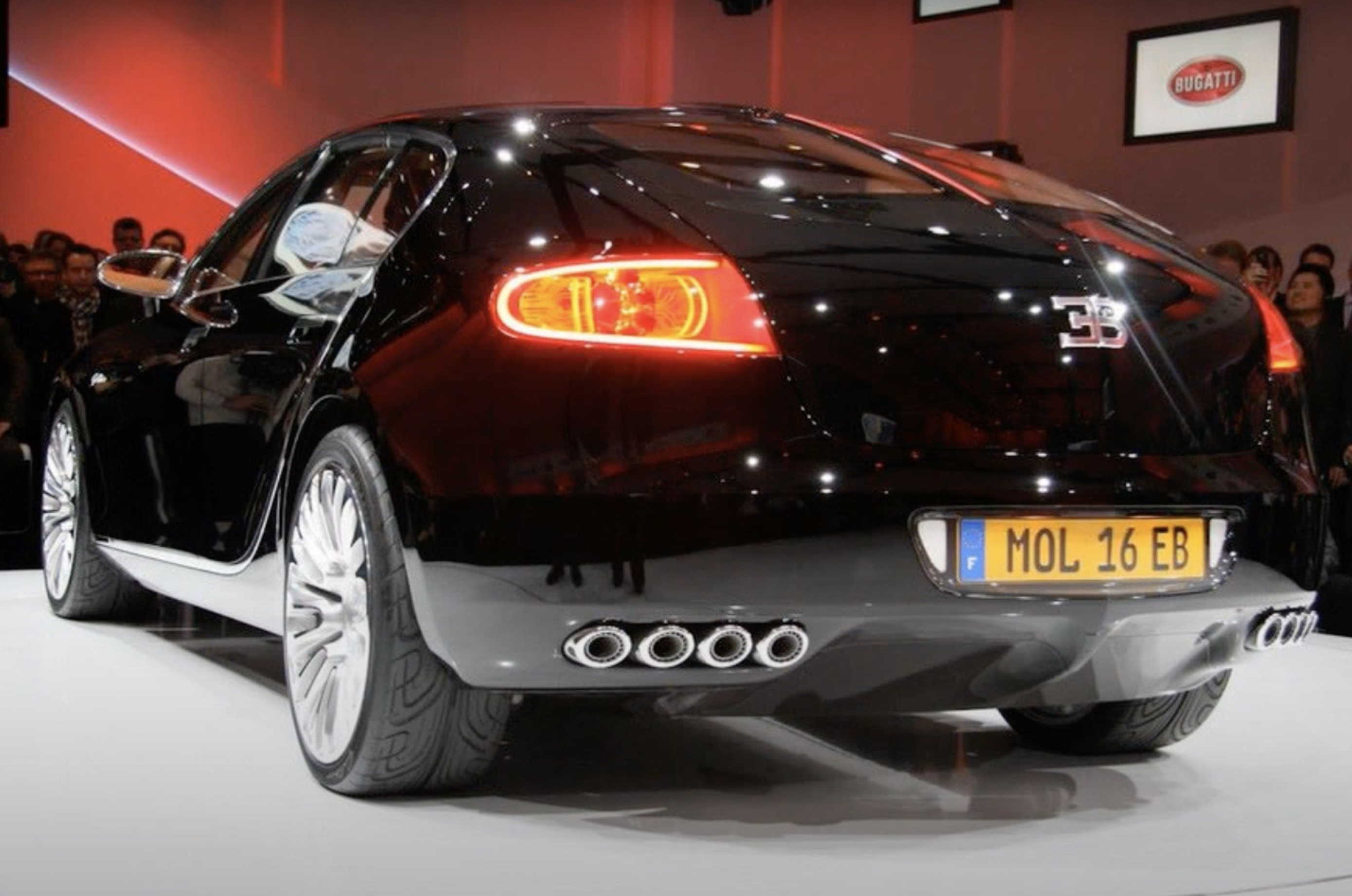
Rear view

A production version of the 16C Galibier concept, expected to be named the Royale, was originally scheduled to reach the market in 2013. In December 2009 a patent was uncovered for a very similar design to the concept, but with a more upright front end and a longer, less curvaceous rear end. In 2011, Bugatti postponed the release of the Royale to 2015 or later to refine the vehicle's design. Bugatti was expected to produce 3000 units of the Galibier compared to 300 of the Veyron. It was also expected to cost more than £1 million.

In a 2014 interview with Top Gear, President of Bugatti Dr. Wolfgang Schreiber said that Bugatti will never manufacture Galibier nor SuperVeyron because it will confuse their customers. Bugatti design director Achim Anscheidt said in 2020 that it was planned was to replace the Veyron with the Galibier as Bugatti's sole model once 450 Veyrons were built. Bugatti bosses asked for significant changes to the production design based on customer clinic feedback from the concept. In an attempt for a more practical "jack of all trades" model, the Galibier grew in length and height, and eschewed the concept's liftgate for a small trunk for further appeal to Chinese buyers. Anscheidt described the new design as looking like a dachshund from the side and "a bowler hat on wheels” from the rear. The Galibier project was cancelled in May 2012, from a viewing by a "powerful and influential gentleman from Salzburg, Austria", (speculated by the press to be Ferdinand Piëch) who expressed a strong disliking of the new design, and how it had changed from the concept. Bugatti then focused their efforts on the Chiron, which had begun development the previous summer as a precaution in case of the Galibier's cancellation.

The 16C Galibier lead to the development of the 2015 Bugatti Rembrandt, which followed the Galibier as a front-engine luxury concept powered by Bugatti's W16, but as a 2 door coupé.

In 2016, the then Bugatti CEO Wolfgang Dürheimer stated a production version of the Galibier concept was being considered as one of four possible alternatives for a successor to the Chiron. In 2020, the company still expressed interest in developing a four-seater model.
