= Bugatti EB 218 =

Jointly developed concept car (1999)

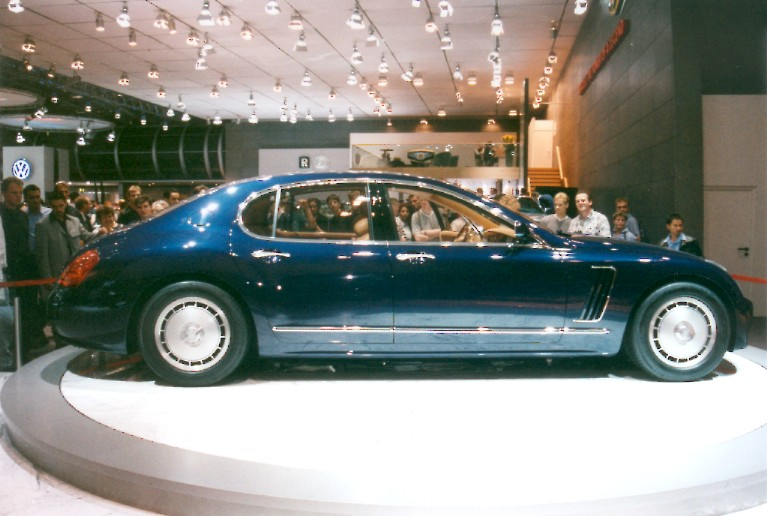
- Bugatti EB 218 at the 1998 IAA

Overview
- Manufacturer: Bugatti Automobiles S.A.S.
- Production: 1999
- Designer: Giorgetto Giugiaro at Italdesign

Body and chassis
- Class: concept car
- Body style: 4-door saloon
- Layout: Front-engine, all-wheel-drive
- Related: Bugatti EB 118; Bugatti 18/3 Chiron; Lamborghini Diablo

Powertrain
- Engine: 6,250 cubic centimetres (381 cu in), 72 Valve W18
- Power output: 555 bhp (414 kW) at 6800 rpm 479 lb⋅ft (649 N⋅m) at 4000 rpm
- Transmission: 5-speed automatic

Dimensions
- Wheelbase: 3,000 mm (118.1 in)
- Length: 5,349 mm (210.6 in)
- Width: 1,989 mm (78.3 in)
- Height: 1,455 mm (57.3 in)
- Curb weight: 2,177 kg (4,799 lb)

Chronology
- Predecessor: Bugatti EB 112
- Successor: Bugatti 16C Galibier

The Bugatti EB 218 saloon is the second concept car presented by Bugatti under the ownership of the Volkswagen Group. The EB 218 was designed by Giorgetto Giugiaro, who also designed the EB 112, the car's predecessor and the EB 118, the car's 2-door variant. The EB 218 can be considered as an update of the EB 112, a concept saloon introduced by Bugatti Automobili SpA in 1993. The EB 218 features Volkswagen's unconventional W18 engine and permanent four-wheel drive borrowed from the Lamborghini Diablo VT.

== Design ==
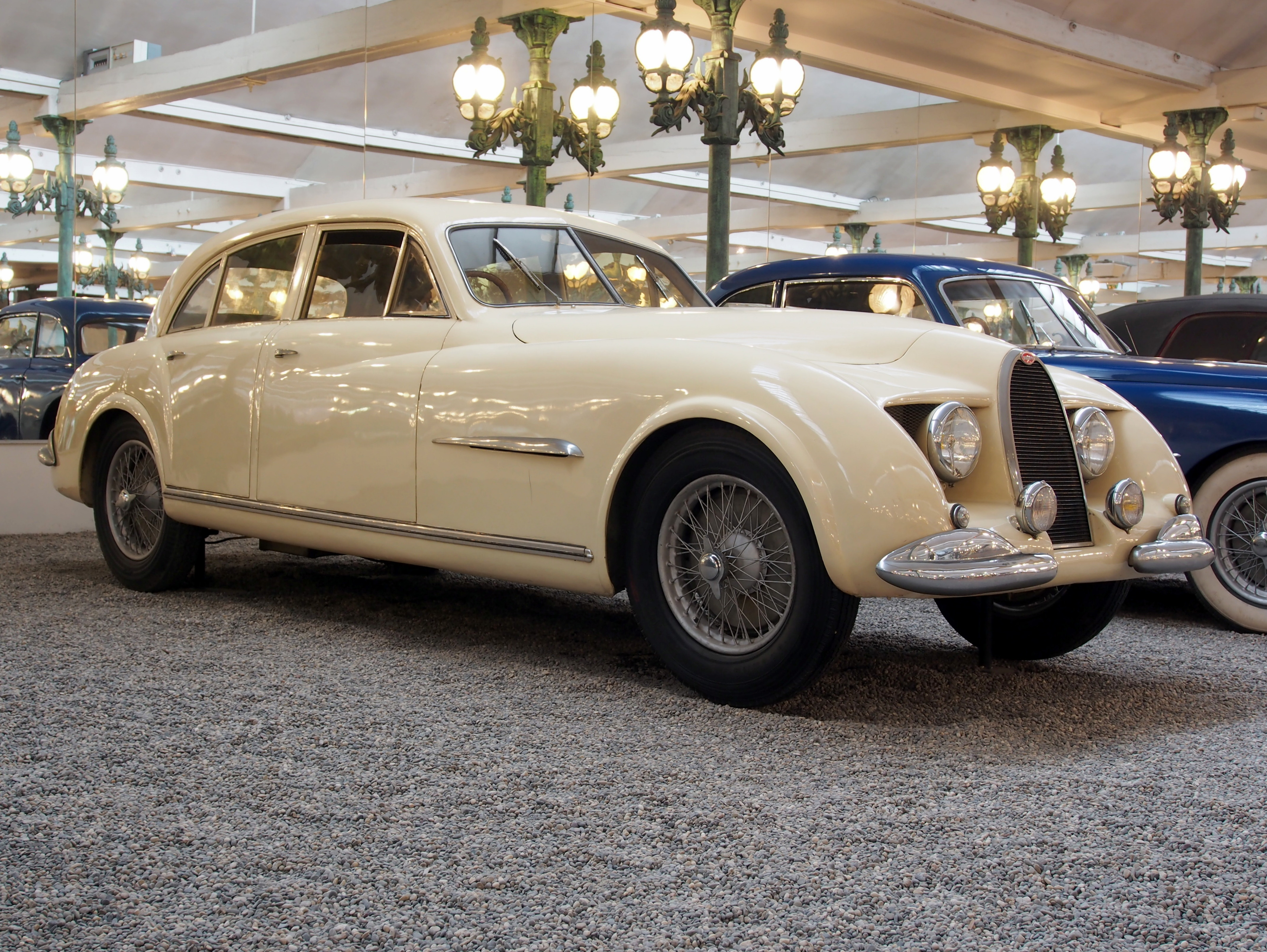
The design of the EB 218 draws inspiration from the Bugatti Type 101 Guillore 4-door saloon

Bugatti commissioned Giorgetto Giugiaro of Italdesign to update the EB 112 concept that he designed for Bugatti Automobili SpA in 1993. The EB218's wheelbase measures 3 m (118.1 in) and it has a total length of 5,385 mm (212.0 in). This makes the EB 218 longer than the EB 112 by 315 mm (12.4 in). The most notable visual differences between the EB 218 and the EB 112 is a redesigned hood, bumpers and lights. The overall design is far less controversial than the EB 112's "Droopy hatchback-saloon" design and has a much more of a typical saloon shape rather than the EB 112's hatchback shape. The interior design is very simple yet extremely luxurious, with beige leather seats and a large wooden dashboard which manages to keep all the instruments and vents "composed". The EB 218 draws inspiration from the classic Type 101 Guillore.

== Debut ==
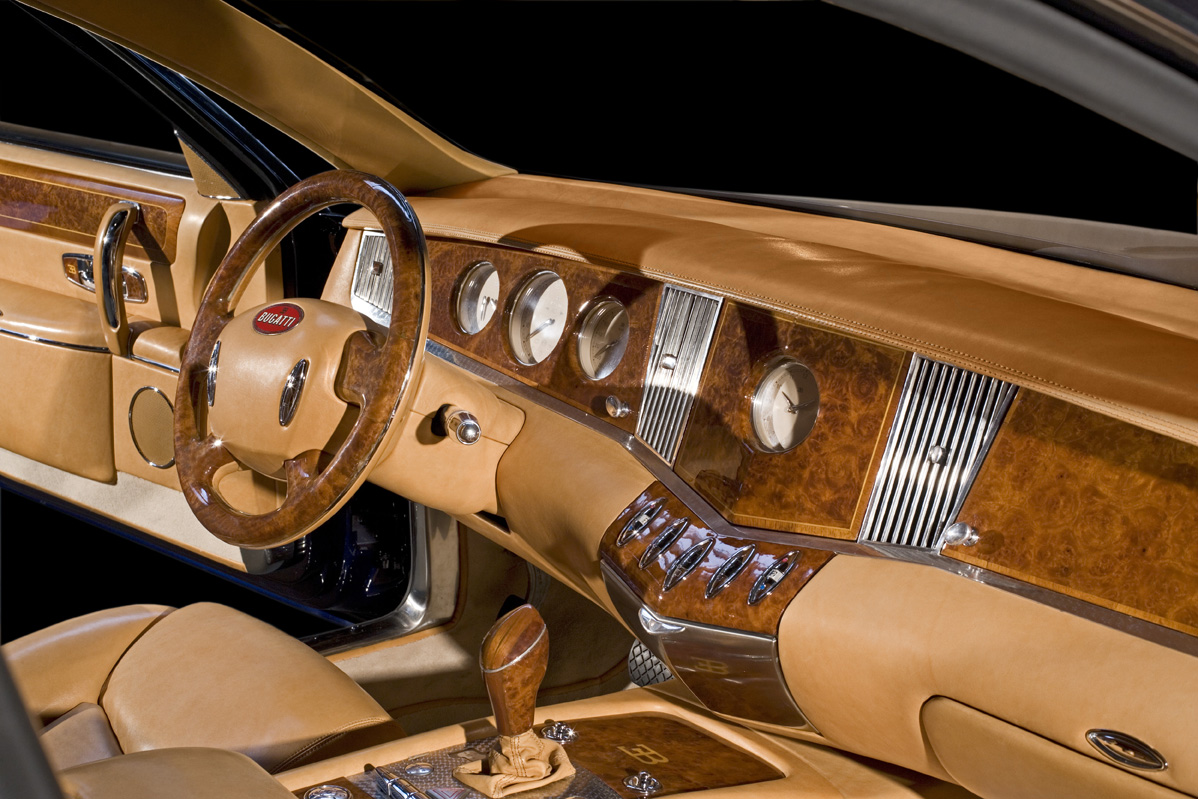
EB 218 interior

Bugatti introduced the EB 218 at the 1999 Geneva Motor Show, one year after its 2-door counterpart was introduced at the 1998 Paris Auto Show.

== Powertrain ==
The EB 218 uses the same W18 engine and permanent four wheel drive powertrain that debuted in the 1998 EB 118. The same technology was used in the 1999 18/3 Chiron concept car.

Power comes from a Volkswagen-designed, 563 PS (414 kW; 555 hp) and 479 lb⋅ft (649 N⋅m), W18 engine. This engine design was extremely unconventional due to the unusual firing order of the engine. The EB 218 W18 engine is composed of three banks of six cylinders with a sixty degree offset between each cylinder bank. In contrast, the W16 engine in Bugatti's (Under Volkswagen ownership) first production car, the 2005 Veyron EB 16.4 features two banks of 8 cylinders, essentially combining two W8 engines. The Volkswagen W16 engine is not the same as W engines from the pre-war cars or the W18. The Volkswagen W16/W12/W8 engines are actually two banks of VR engines. In the case of the later Veyron they took the W12 from Bentley, itself being two VR6 engines, removing 4 cylinders to make a W8 and doubling it longitudinally. Note that the W18 was actually a "real" W engine with 3 banks of 6 cylinders. The EB 218 has the permanent all-wheel drive taken from the Lamborghini Diablo VT sports car.
