= Bugatti 18/3 Chiron =

Concept car developed by Bugatti and Italdesign in 1999

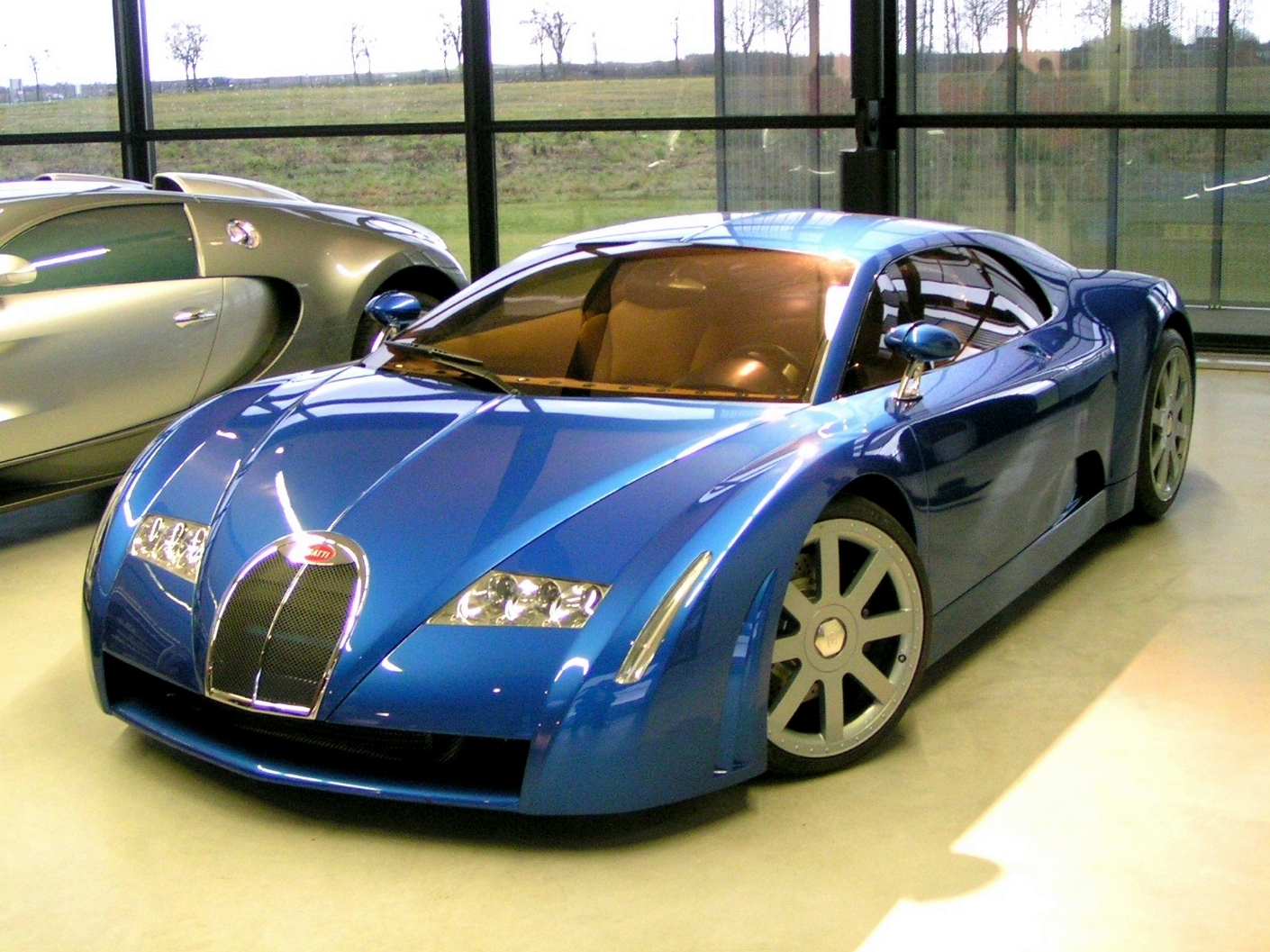

Overview
- Manufacturer: Bugatti Automobiles S.A.S.
- Production: 1999
- Assembly: Italy: Moncalieri (Italdesign)
- Designer: Fabrizio Giugiaro at Italdesign under Hartmut Warkuß

Body and chassis
- Class: concept car
- Body style: 2-door coupé
- Layout: Mid-engine, four-wheel drive
- Related: Bugatti EB 118; Bugatti EB 218; Lamborghini Diablo; Bugatti Veyron

Powertrain
- Engine: 6,250 cubic centimetres (381 cu in) W18
- Power output: 555 brake horsepower (414 kW) @ 6800 RPM; 479 pound force-feet (649 N⋅m) @ 4000 rpm
- Transmission: 5-speed manual

Dimensions
- Wheelbase: 2,650 mm (104 in)
- Length: 4,420 mm (174 in)
- Width: 1,994 mm (78.5 in)
- Height: 1,150 mm (45 in)
- Kerb weight: 1,700 kilograms (3,700 lb)

Chronology
- Successor: Bugatti Veyron (Spirtual); Bugatti Chiron (Name Plate)

The Bugatti 18/3 Chiron is a 1999 concept car developed by French automobile manufacturer Bugatti Automobiles and designed by Fabrizio Giugiaro of Italdesign. Powered by a 6.3 L W18 engine, it is a 2-seater mid-engine coupé. The 18/3 Chiron was the last in a trio of Bugatti concept cars by Italdesign, after the 1998 EB 118 coupé and the 1999 EB 218 saloon.

The Chiron name was used again on the 2016 successor to the Bugatti Veyron.

== Name origin ==
The 18/3 Chiron is named after Bugatti race driver Louis Chiron, while the "18/3" prefix stands for the engine's 18 cylinders distributed into three banks of six cylinders each.

== Description ==
The Bugatti 18/3 Chiron premiered at the Frankfurt Motor Show in September 1999.

=== Design ===
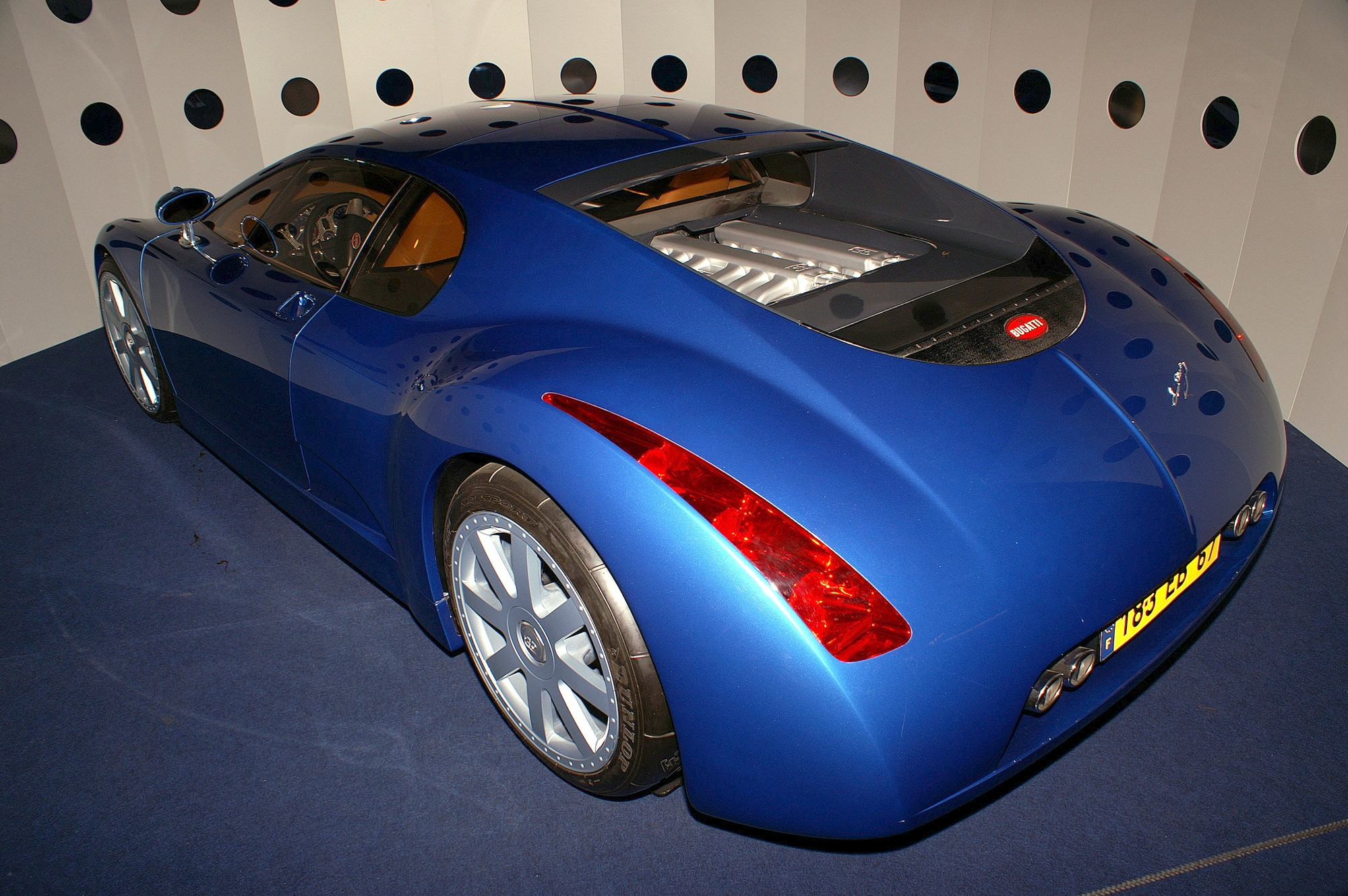
Rear three-quarters view

The design of the Chiron was entrusted to Fabrizio Giugiaro of Italdesign with input from Hartmut Warkuß from the Volkswagen design centre in Wolfsburg. Airflow management and aerodynamics were key considerations in the exterior design. Below the traditional horseshoe radiator grille, a large opening provides enough air to the radiators of the 6.3-litre engine; much of this air is extracted though vents located forward of the front wheel openings. A similar system is used on the side of the car to cool the rear brakes. At the rear a diffuser was integrated in the rear bumper. A retractable rear wing deploys at high speeds, much like on the EB 110. The 20-inch eight-spoke wheels resemble the cast aluminium wheels first found on Louis Chiron's Type 35B. The body work was made from carbon fibre. Lighting on both ends of the car was cutting edge at its time, including triple Xenon headlights and elongated turn signals at the rear which also served as the taillights of the car, two double exhaust pipes were visible through a large air extractor at the rear which also served as the underbody spoiler. Inside, the cabin is upholstered in Blu Pacifico and Sabbia leather with aluminium accents. A removable watch is also present on the passenger's side.

Important design elements such as the classic horseshoe grille, inset front lights, converging front hood and an exposed intake plenum would eventually be integrated into the production Veyron EB 16.4.

=== Engine and chassis ===
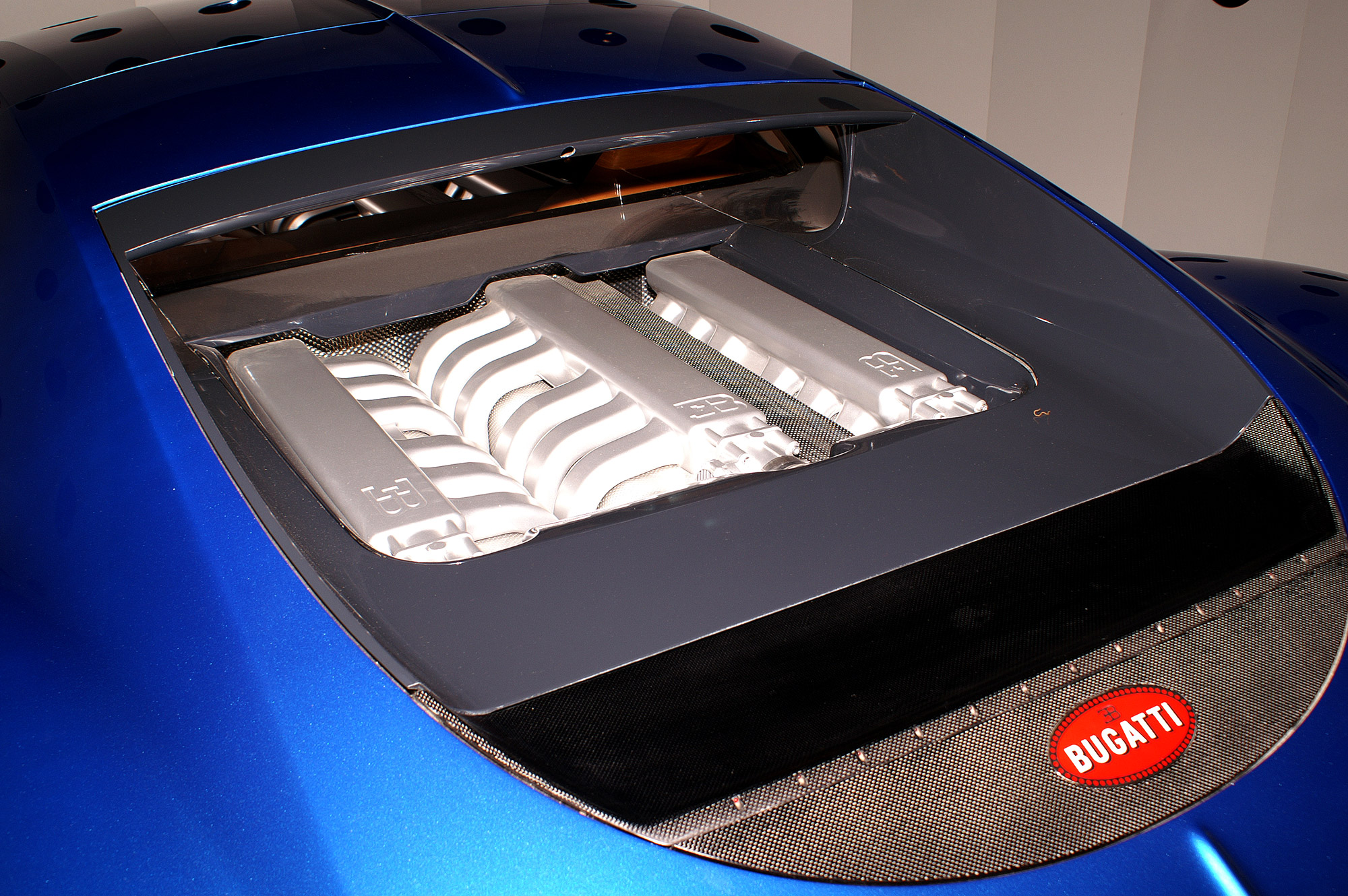
The exposed inlet manifolds of the W18 engine

In order to construct a fully working prototype, Bugatti sourced the chassis and four-wheel drive system from the Lamborghini Diablo VT. The 18/3 Chiron uses the same Volkswagen-designed W18 engine that debuted on the 1998 EB 118 and the 1999 EB 218 concept cars. As on the other two cars, the Chiron's W18 has a power output of 563 PS (414 kW; 555 hp) and 649 N⋅m (479 lb⋅ft) of torque. The 18/3 Chiron's W18 engine is composed of three banks of six cylinders with a sixty-degree offset between each cylinder bank. In contrast, the W16 engine in the 2005 Veyron EB 16.4 features a four-bank configuration of four cylinders each, totalling sixteen cylinders.
