= Bugatti EB 118 =

French concept car

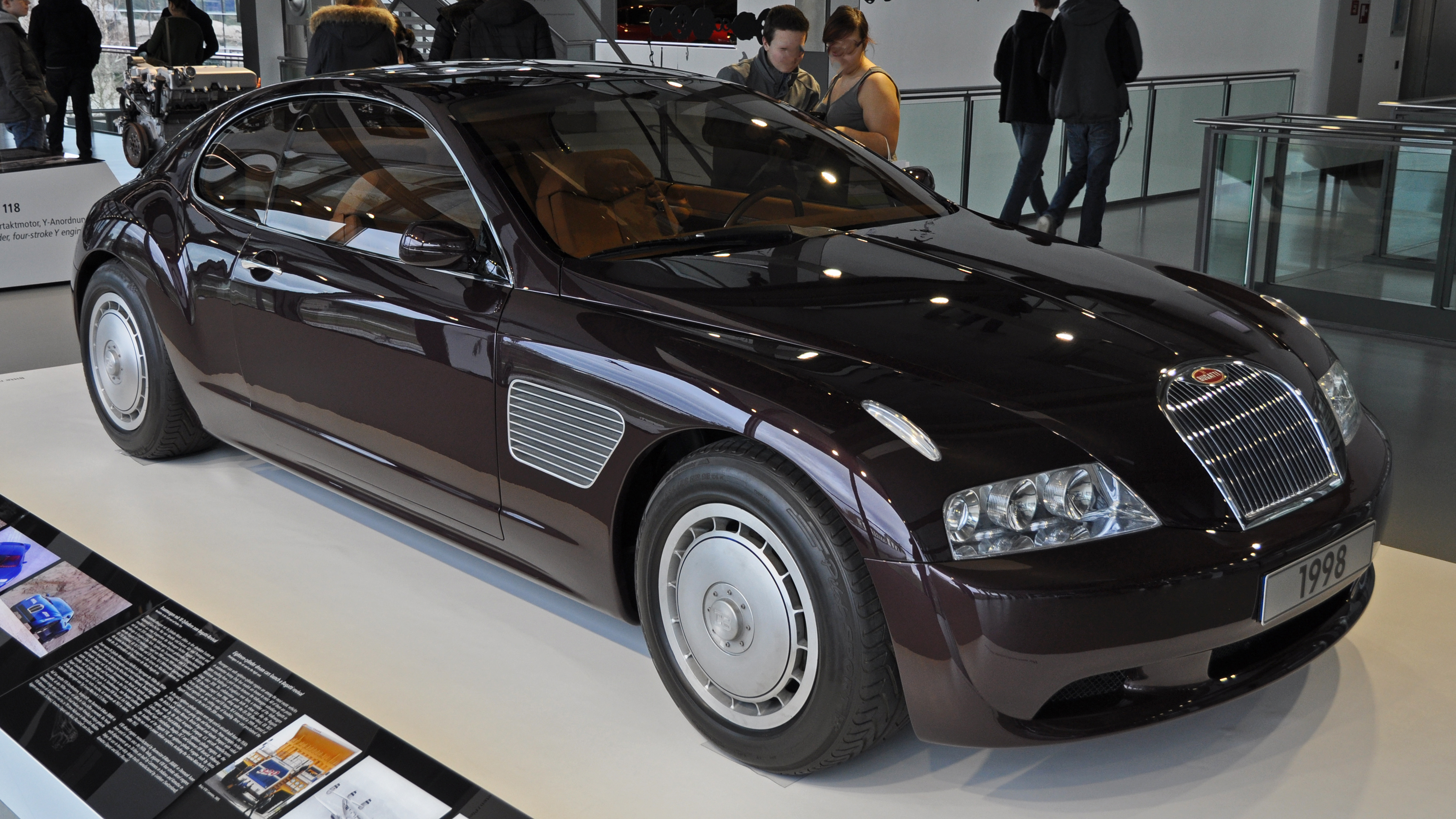

Overview
- Manufacturer: Bugatti Automobiles S.A.S.
- Production: 1998
- Designer: Giorgetto Giugiaro at Italdesign

Body and chassis
- Class: Concept car
- Body style: 2-door coupé
- Layout: Front-engine, all-wheel-drive
- Related: Bugatti EB 218; Lamborghini Diablo

Powertrain
- Engine: 6,250 cubic centimetres (381 cu in) W18
- Power output: 555 brake horsepower (414 kW) @ 6800 RPM; 479 pound force-feet (649 N⋅m) @ 4000 rpm
- Transmission: 5-speed automatic

Dimensions
- Length: 198.8 in (5,050 mm)
- Width: 78.3 in (1,989 mm)
- Height: 55.9 in (1,420 mm)
- Curb weight: 2,177 kilograms (4,799 lb)

The Bugatti EB 118 is the first concept car developed by Bugatti Automobiles S.A.S. The 2-door coupé was presented at the 1998 Paris Motor Show. Bugatti commissioned the design of the EB 118 from Giorgetto Giugiaro of Italdesign. The EB 118 is powered by a W18 engine and has permanent All-wheel drive.

== Design ==
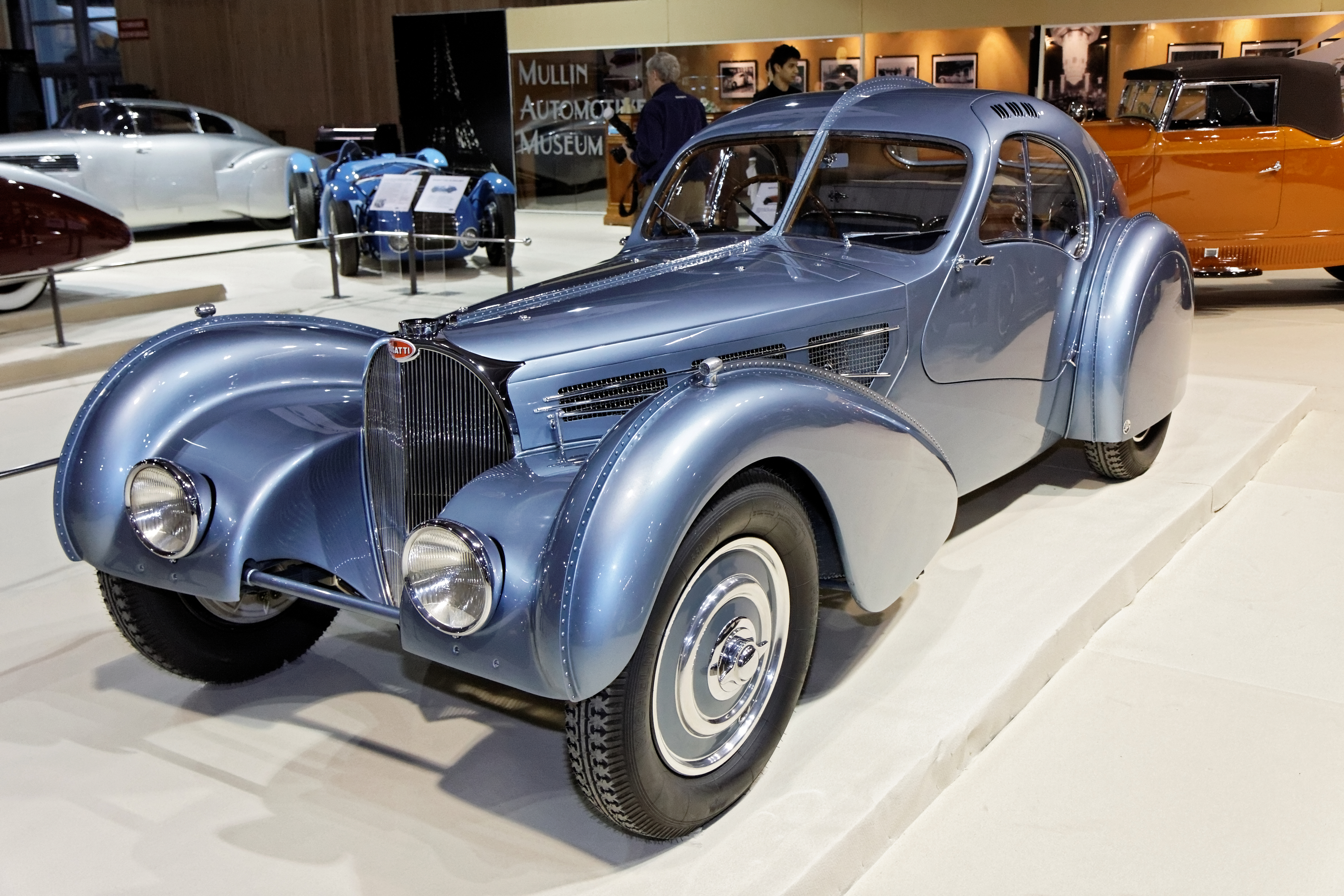
The Bugatti 57SC Atlantic, which inspired the design of the EB 118.

The design of the car is intended to echo the 1931 Type 50 and the 57SC Atlantic. The EB 118 has a longitudinal rib that echoes the Atlantic's longitudinal body seam.

== Debut ==
Bugatti introduced the EB 118 at the 1998 Paris Auto Show. After its Paris debut, Bugatti displayed the EB 118 along with its four-door counterpart the EB 218 at the Geneva Auto Show and the Tokyo Motor Show in 1999. The design was already production ready, but Bugatti Automobiles S.A.S. decided that they wanted to focus on a sports car based on the 18/3 Chiron concept car introduced in 1999, so that the EB 118 stayed a concept car and never made it into production.

== Powertrain ==
Power comes from a Volkswagen-designed W18 engine which produces 555 hp (414 kW; 563 PS) and 479 lb⋅ft (649 N⋅m) of torque. The EB 118 W18 engine has three banks of six cylinders with a sixty degree offset between each cylinder bank. The EB 118 also features permanent four wheel drive taken from the Lamborghini Diablo VT.

This same powertrain was later used in both the 1999 EB 218 and 1999 18/3 Chiron cars.
