= De La Chapelle =

French car manufacturer

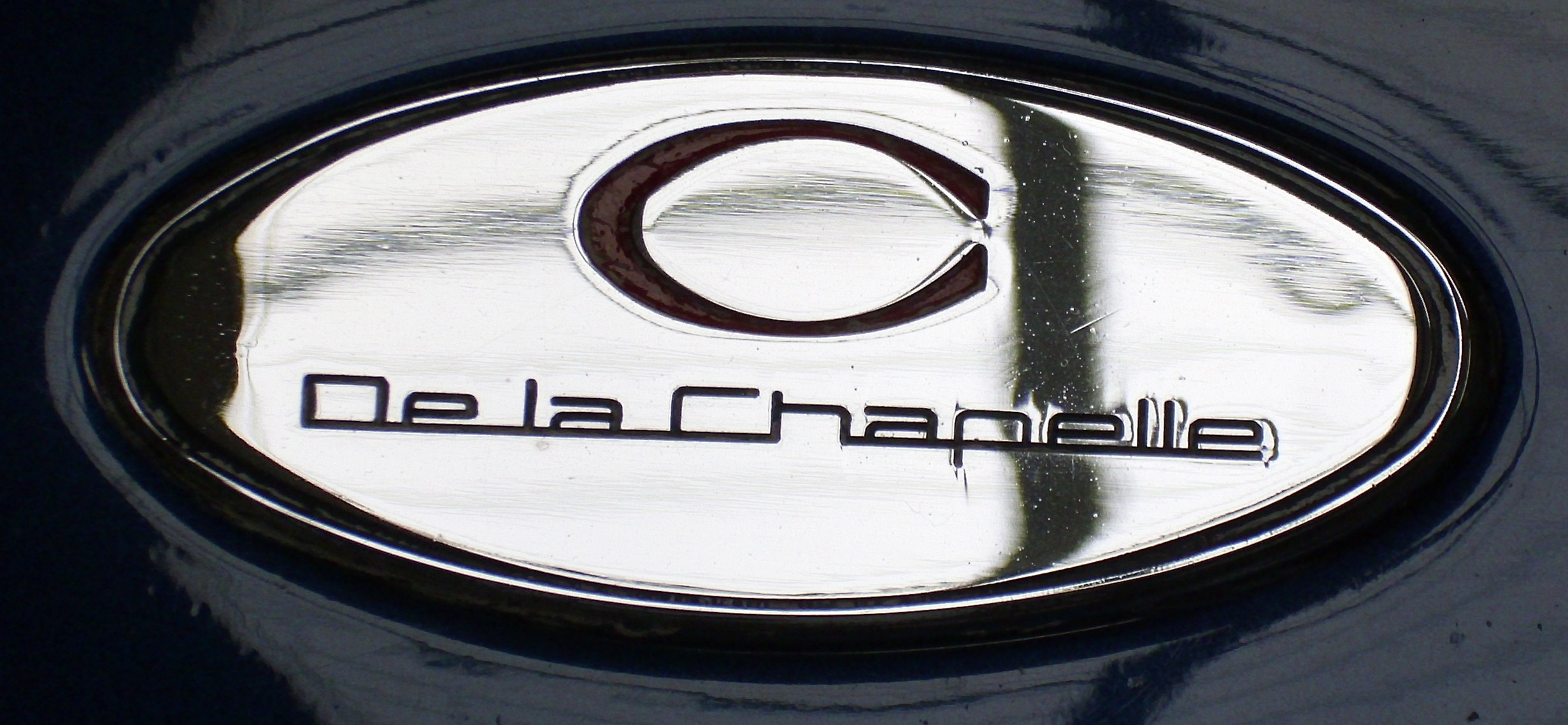
- Industry: Automotive
- Founded: 1975
- Founder: Xavier de la Chapelle
- Headquarters: Saint-Chamond, France
- Products: replicas; sports cars; Junior cars
- Website: www.delachapelle.com

De la Chapelle is a French independent car builder. "De la Chapelle Frères et Compagnie", the original, historic instance of the marque, built full-size automobiles from 1910 until 1914. A revival took place in 1975 by Xavier de la Chapelle, starting as a Bugatti replica maker which manufactured cars from 1978 until 1982. The Type 55 Replica initially reused the company's Belle Époque brand name "Stimula".

The company was restarted again in 1985, bringing back the Stimula Roadster and gradually adding variants of that model. In 1996 they created the "Roadster", the company's first own creation.

They also make miniature copies of real-cars for children.

The Replicas are powered by BMW (straight-six), the Roadster by Peugeot (straight-four/V6) and the concept car by Mercedes-Benz (V8) or Jaguar (V12) engines.

== De la Chapelle Frères et Compagnie ==
The company was formed in 1900 to manufacture bicycles. Motorcycle production started in 1901, and voiturette production in 1907, with full-size, four-cylindre cars being built from 1910. The first light car to enter production was the 8CV, which used a De Dion-Bouton engine. This single-cylinder engine had a bore and stroke of 100 mm × 130 mm (3.94 in × 5.12 in), for an overall displacement of 1 litre (1,021 cc).

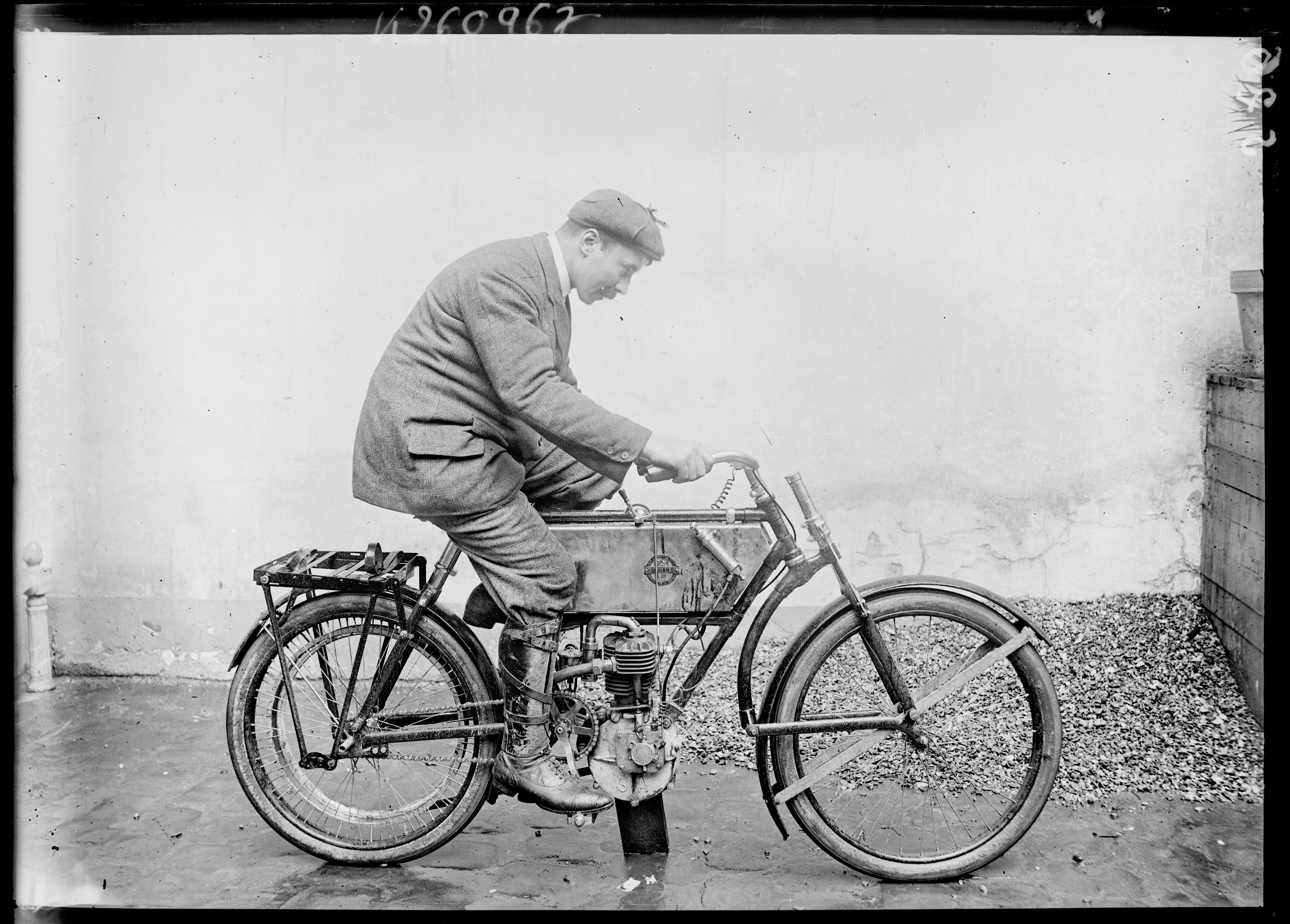
1905 Stimula motorcycle

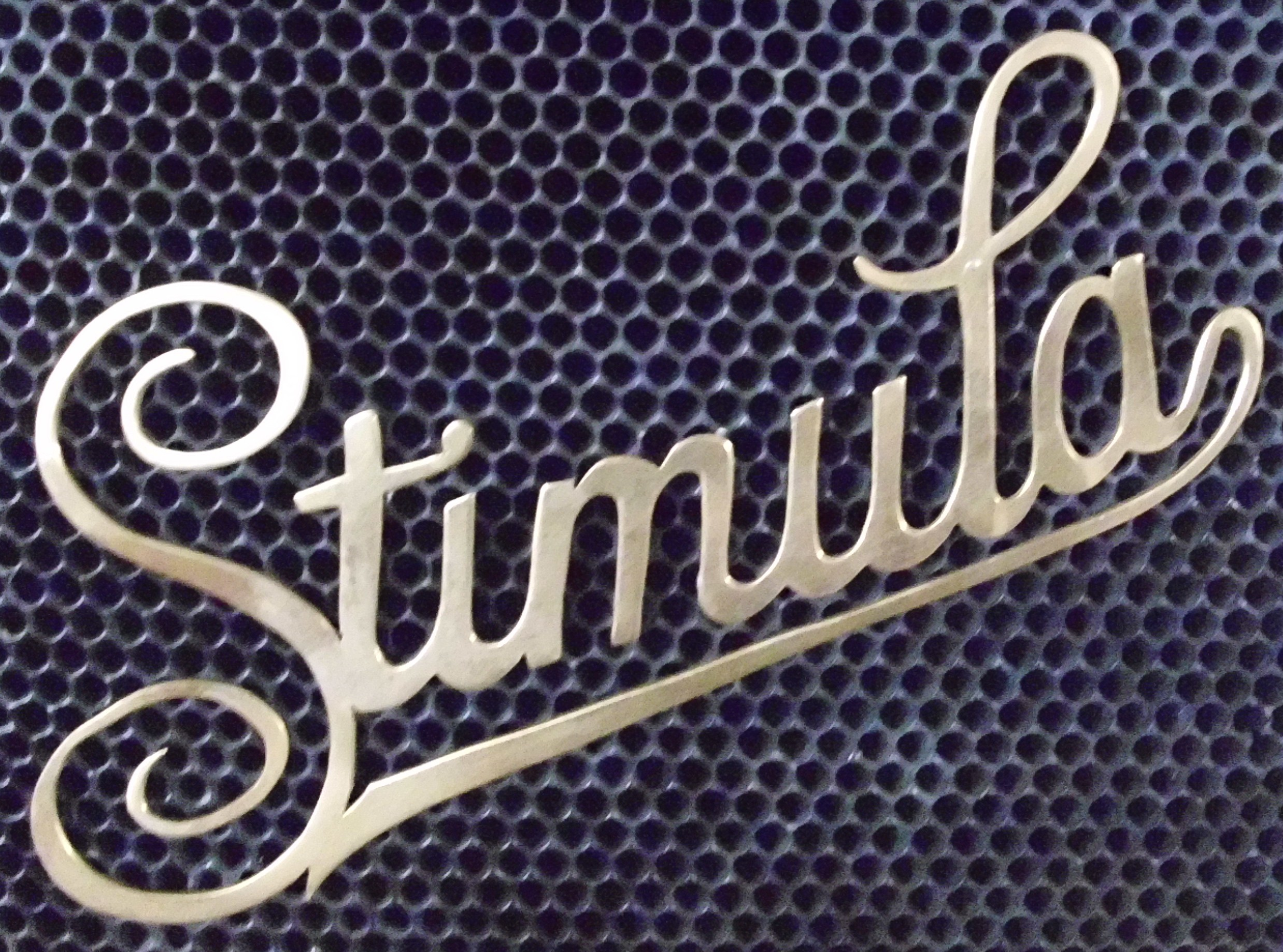
"Stimula" badge (1912)

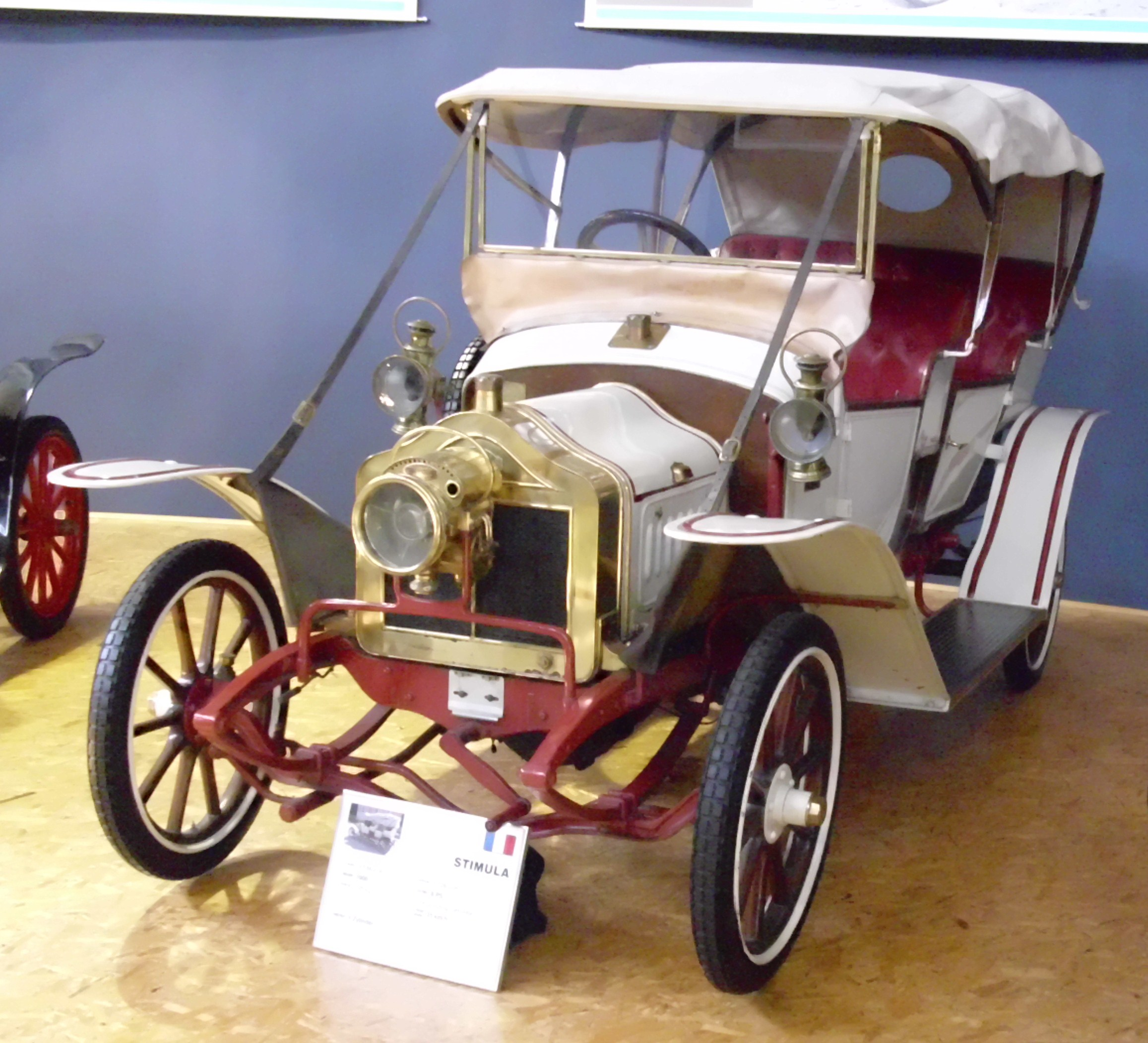
1908 Stimula 8CV

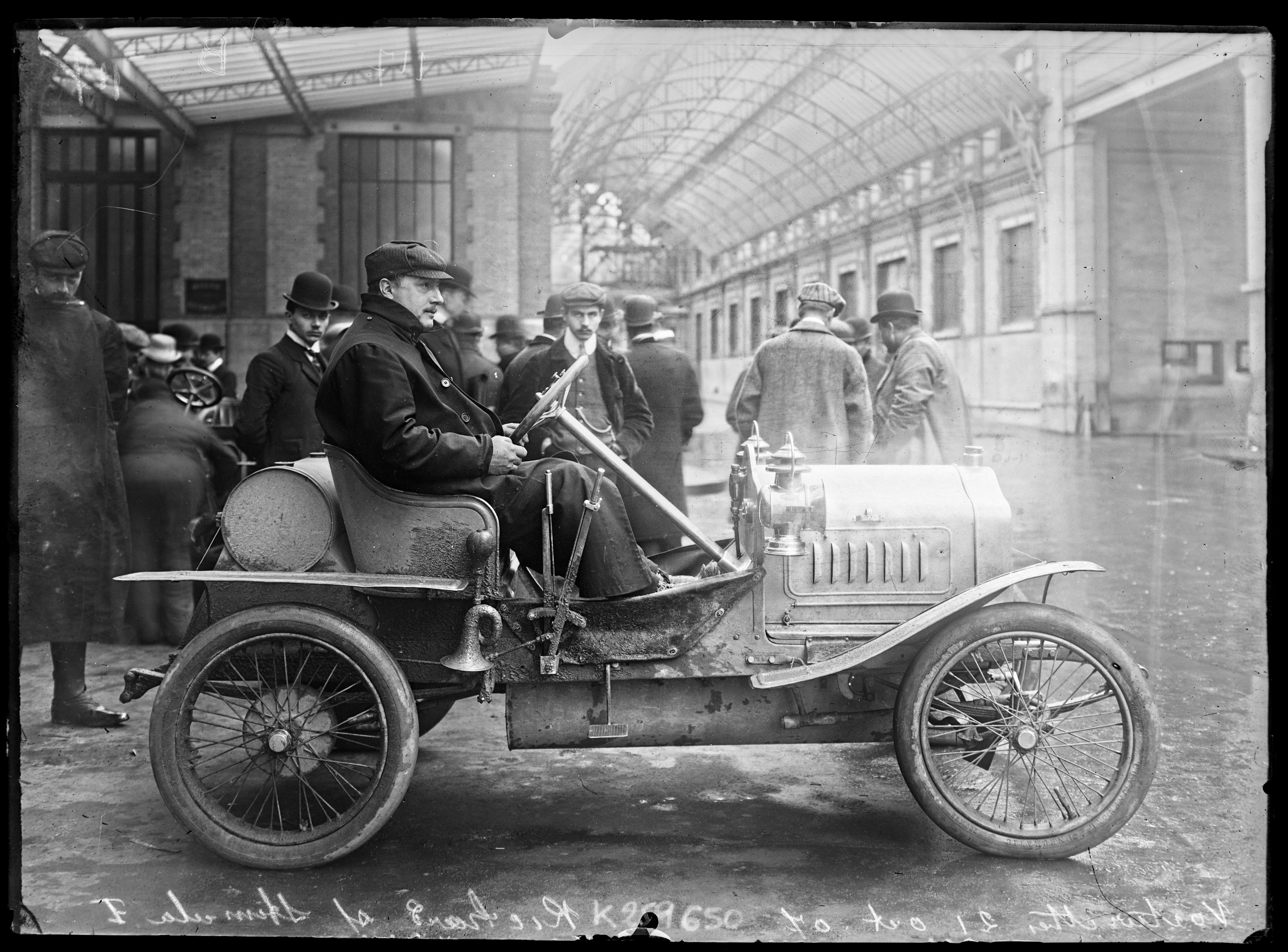
One of the first Stimulas, October 1907

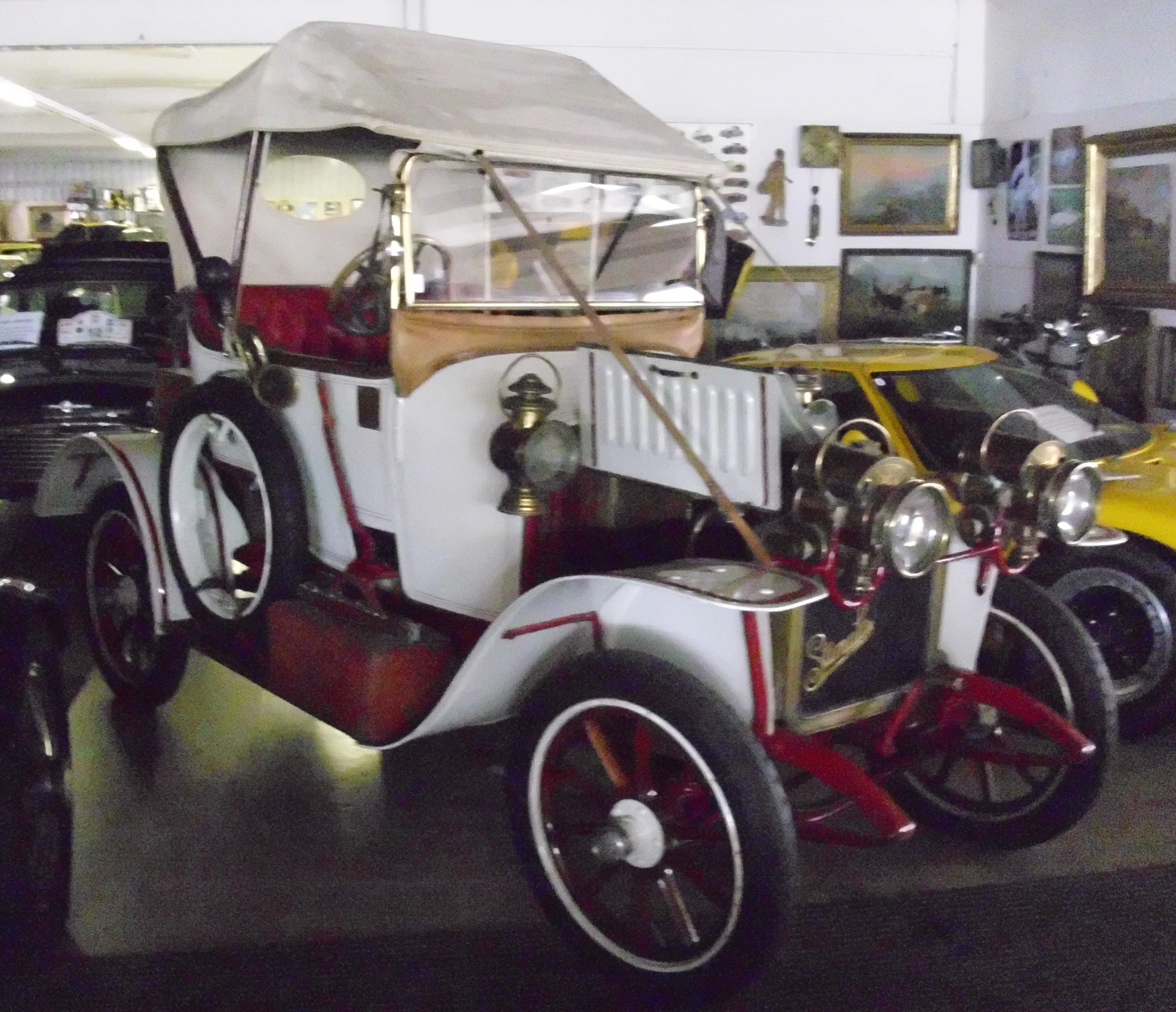
1912 Stimula single-cylinder car

== De La Chapelle (revival) ==
The first type 55 replica, built between 1978 and 1982, used the cam-in-head six-cylinder engine from the Opel Commodore. This was not a direct replica of the Bugatti Type 55, but rather an homage - no dimensions are identical and the entire car was designed to suit the use of smaller, modern wheels. In 1982, the company obtained the right to use BMW six-cylinder engines displacing between 2.0 and 2.5 litres and allowing the cars to be serviced at BMW dealerships throughout France. The company also hired Lyon-based designer Bertrand Barré to add additional variations on the theme, starting with the 2+2 Tourer in 1990, followed by the sleeker, lower-cost Grand Prix in 1992. Six Atalantes were also built.

The company's original designs, both also designed by Barré, were the Peugeot-engined Roadster (four examples built) and the Mercedes-Benz V8-engined Parcours minivan (three built).

=== Replicas ===
- De la Chapelle type 55
- De la Chapelle Tourer
- De la Chapelle Grand Prix
- De la Chapelle Atalante

=== Proper models ===
- De la Chapelle Parcours
- De la Chapelle Roadster
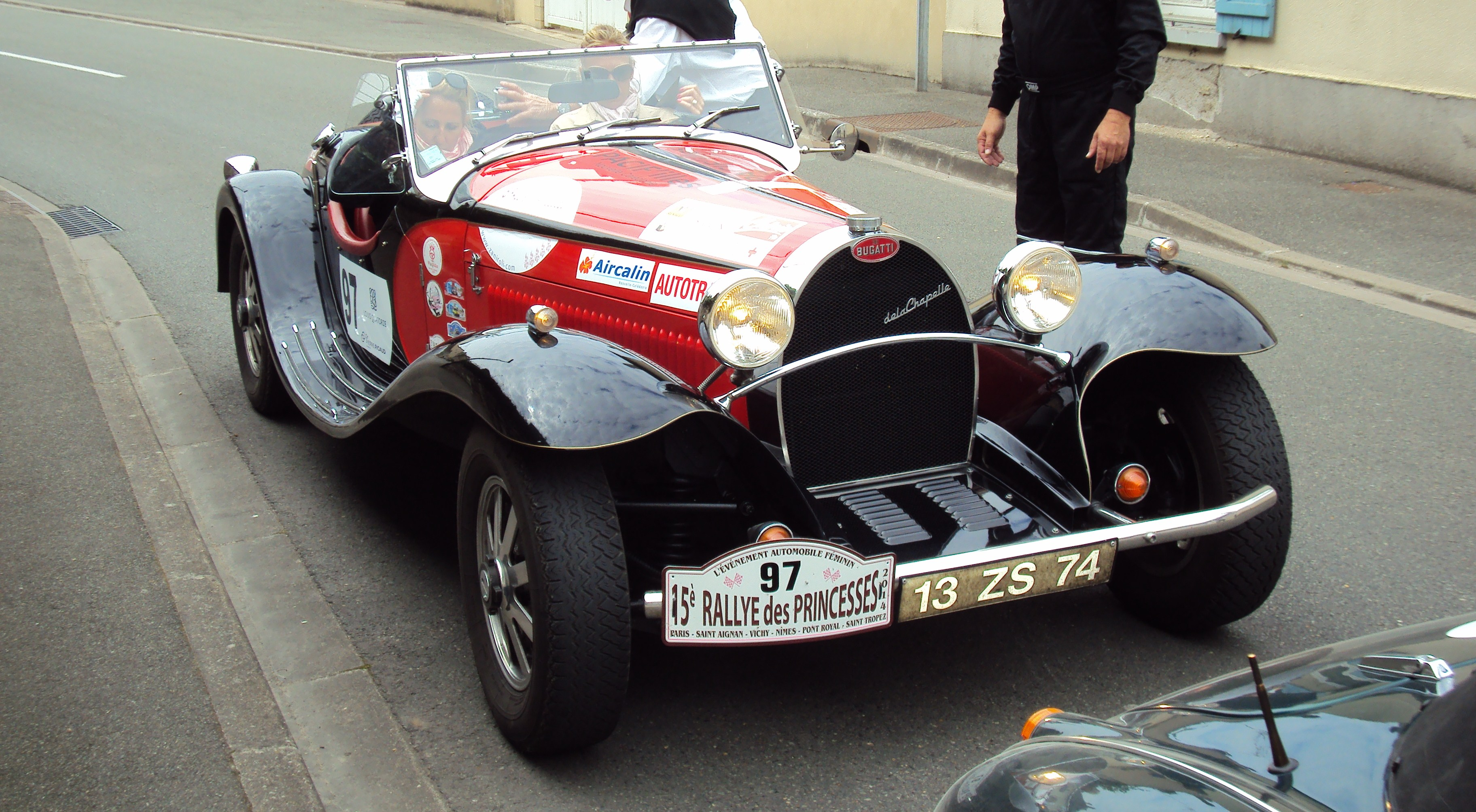
De la Chapelle Type 55

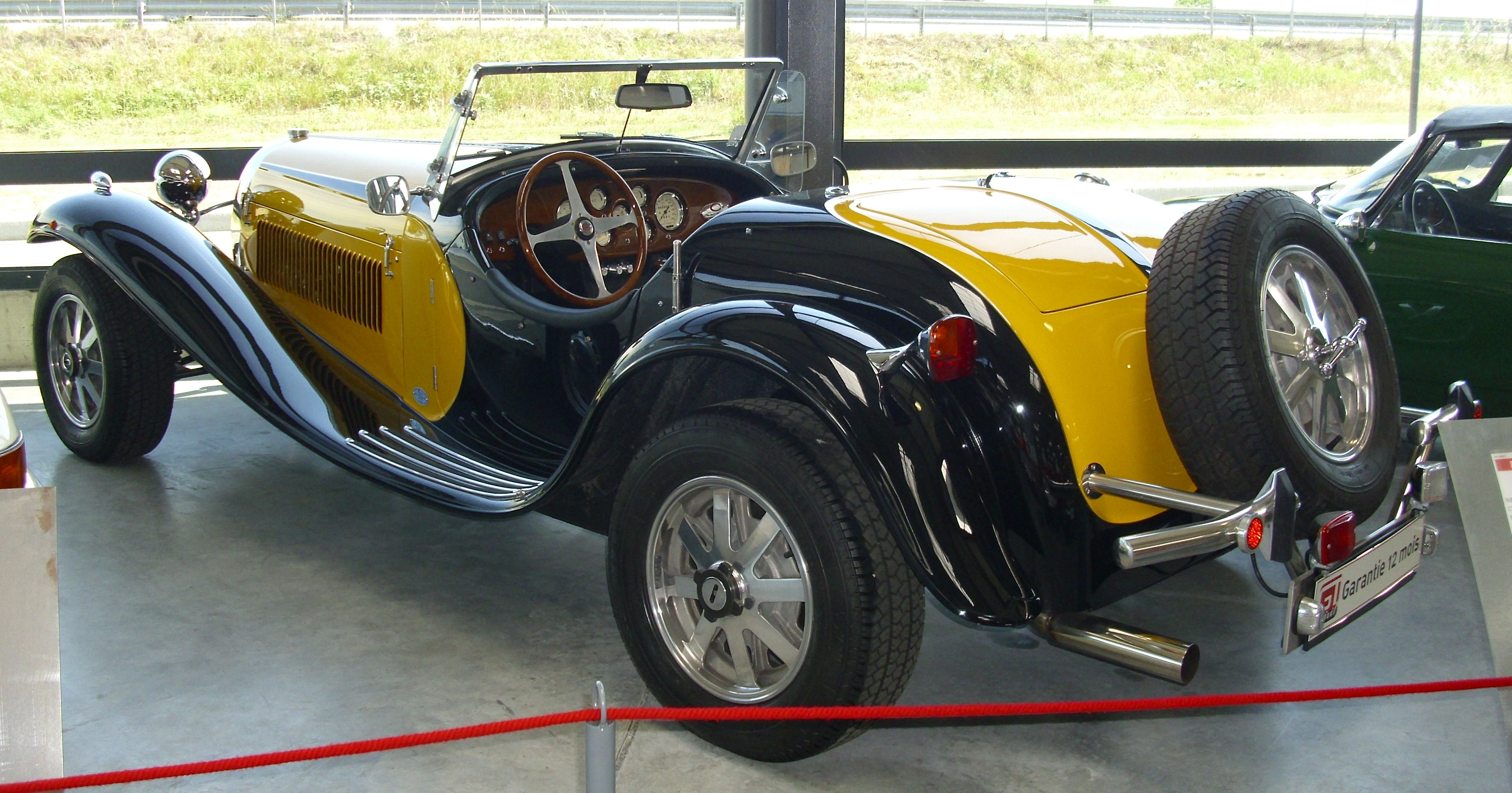
Rear view

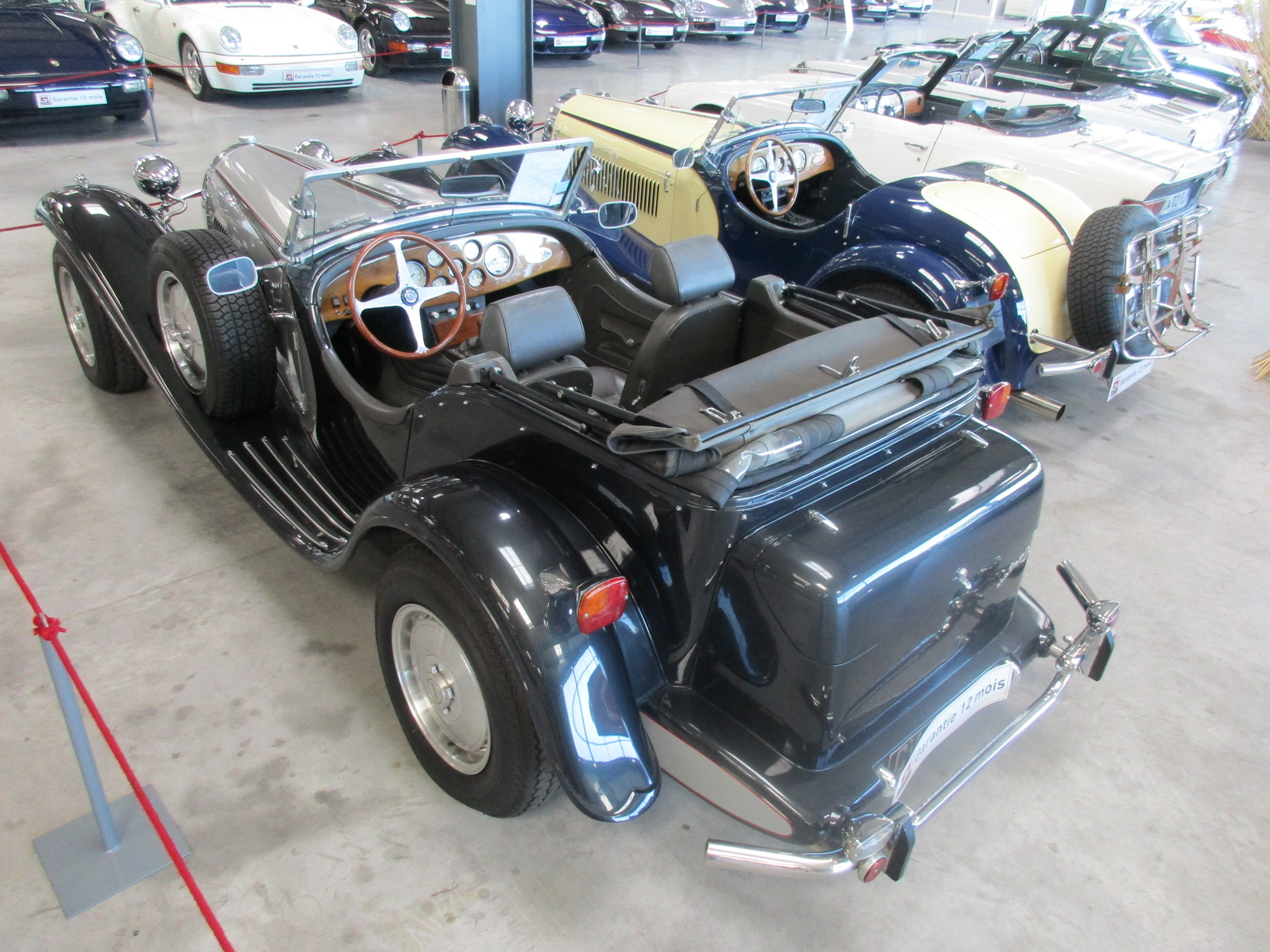
The De La Chapelle Tourer offered 2+2 seating

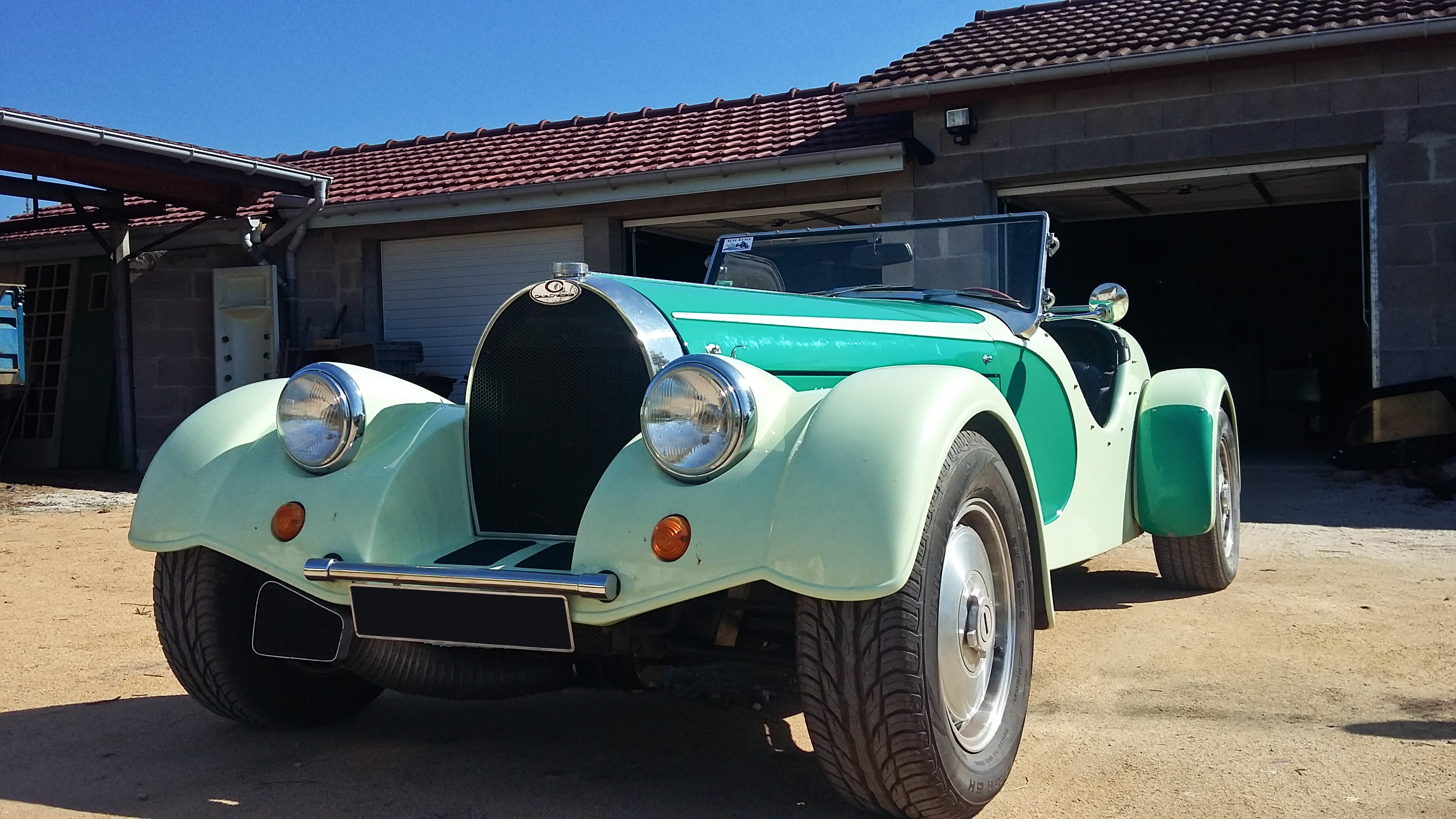
The De la Chapelle Grand Prix was a sporting, streamlined version with less trim, no bumpers, etcetera

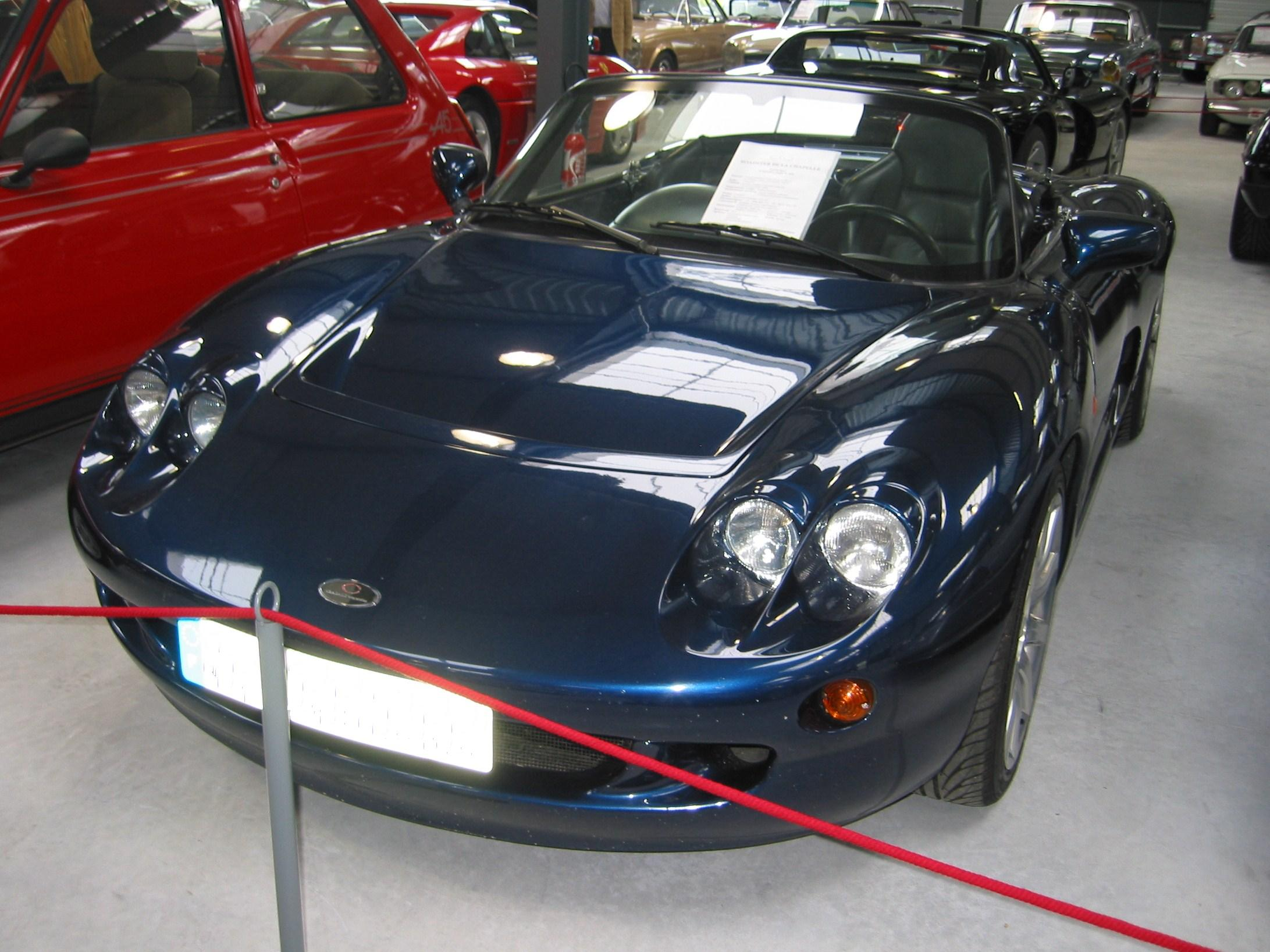
De La Chapelle Roadster

=== Junior replica models ===
These junior replicas are small-scale copies of real, classic cars. They entered production in 1979, starting with the BMW 328 and Bugatti Type 55 replicas, joined later by the Ferrari 330 P2 copy. Unlike many other junior cars, which use electrical motors, De La Chapelle's offerings had internal combustion engines. Around 1,500 examples were built until production ended towards the end of the 1990s.

- BMW 328
- Bugatti Type 55
- Ferrari F 330 P2
