= Antem =

French coachbuilder

Antem & Monroig Antem Monroig & Guyot Antem Carrossier
- Industry: Automotive
- Founded: 1923
- Defunct: 1997
- Services: automotive design, coachbuilding

Antem Carrossier (initially: Antem & Monroig or Antem Monroig & Guyot) was a French coachbuilding company that, in the period between the world wars and a short time afterwards, produced one-off bodies for luxury car chassis, as well as some bodies in small series production.

== Jean Antem ==
The founder of the company was the Spaniard Jean Antem (1893–1972), born as Juan Antem either in Barcelona or in Palma de Mallorca, depending on the source. Antem's father had a wheelwright business in Catalonia. After completing an apprenticeship as a blacksmith in Spain, Jean Antem moved to France in 1910. In the following years he worked in Paris for various body manufacturers. Some sources state that he also completed training with Van den Plas. It is not clear whether this was the Belgian company Carrosserie Vanden Plas or the independent Paris company Willy van den Plas. Antem returned to Catalonia during the First World War, but went back to Paris immediately after the armistice in 1918. In 1929 he took French citizenship and changed his first name from Juan to Jean.

== History ==
In 1919, Antem founded an automobile repair shop in the Paris suburb of Levallois-Perret. After the Spaniard Camille Monroig took a stake in the company, this became the company Antem & Monroig, which was based in Neuilly-sur-Seine and produced bodies for automobiles from 1924 onwards. In 1924 Antem & Monroig exhibited for the first time at the Paris Motor Show. In 1925 the company got another shareholder; it then traded as Antem Monroig & Guyot. Four years later, Antem took over the shares of its business partners. The company was then called Antem Carrossier. After the end of the Second World War, Antem moved into new premises in Courbevoie.

The importance of Antem among coachbuilders of that era is assessed differently amongst sources. Some sources consider the company to be one of the leading French coachbuilders of the interwar period, while others see Antem as "one of the best of the second set".

=== Automobile bodies ===
In the 1930s, Antem manufactured exclusive one-off bodies on chassis from Delahaye, Talbot-Lago and Bugatti; There were also occasional bodies for Mercedes-Benz, Rolls-Royce, and other chassis. However, small series orders for Ariès and Corre La Licorne ensured economic survival during this time.

After the end of the Second World War, Antem resumed body production. The company focused primarily on the luxury manufacturer Delahaye, with Antem supplying a large portion of the bodies for the Delahaye Type 235. Stylistically, the structures were considered heavy and conservative. A number of individual bodies were also created, including a coupé body for the last Bugatti Type 101 chassis (chassis number 101.504), which in later years temporarily belonged to the actor Nicolas Cage. At times there were close business relationships with the small series manufacturer Deutsch Bonnet, for whom Antem not only manufactured some road vehicles based on the 2 Liters model (1949), but also bodied some racing vehicles. A number of individual bodies were also built on Citroën chassis. These were often pontoon-style coupés, and more rarely four-door sedans, some of which had expansive bodies with free-standing fenders. A small four-door sedan was also created as a one-off on the chassis of the Citroën 2CV. Many of Antem's bodies of this era were designs by Philippe Charbonneaux, including the 2CV sedan.

In 1955 Antem ended production of automotive bodies.

=== Commercial bodies ===
One of Antem's sons moved the business to the town of Doudeville in Normandy. There the company manufactured vehicle trailers and cabs for tractors. Operations ceased in 1997.

== Gallery ==
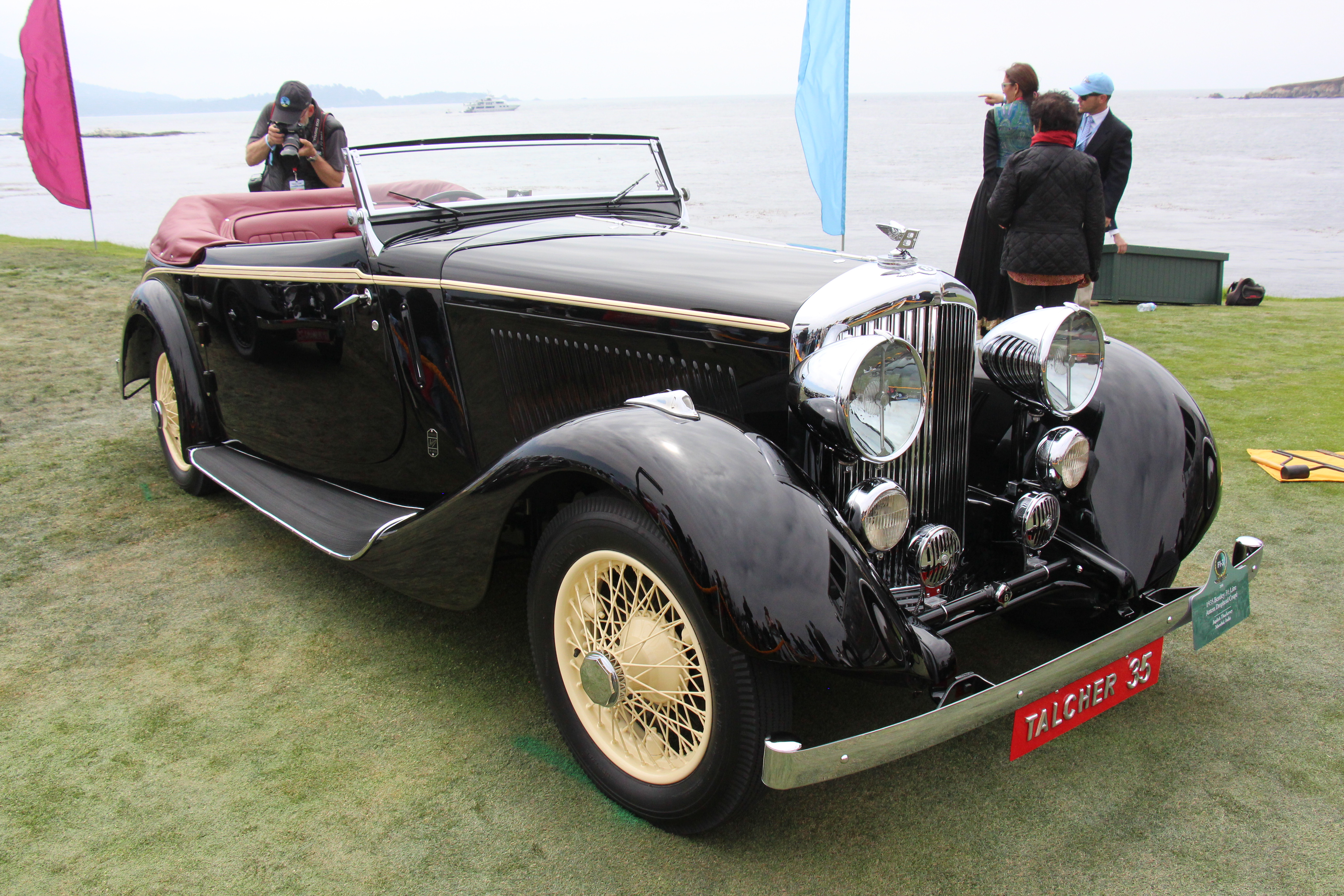
1935 Bentley 3.5 Litre Drophead Coupe by Antem

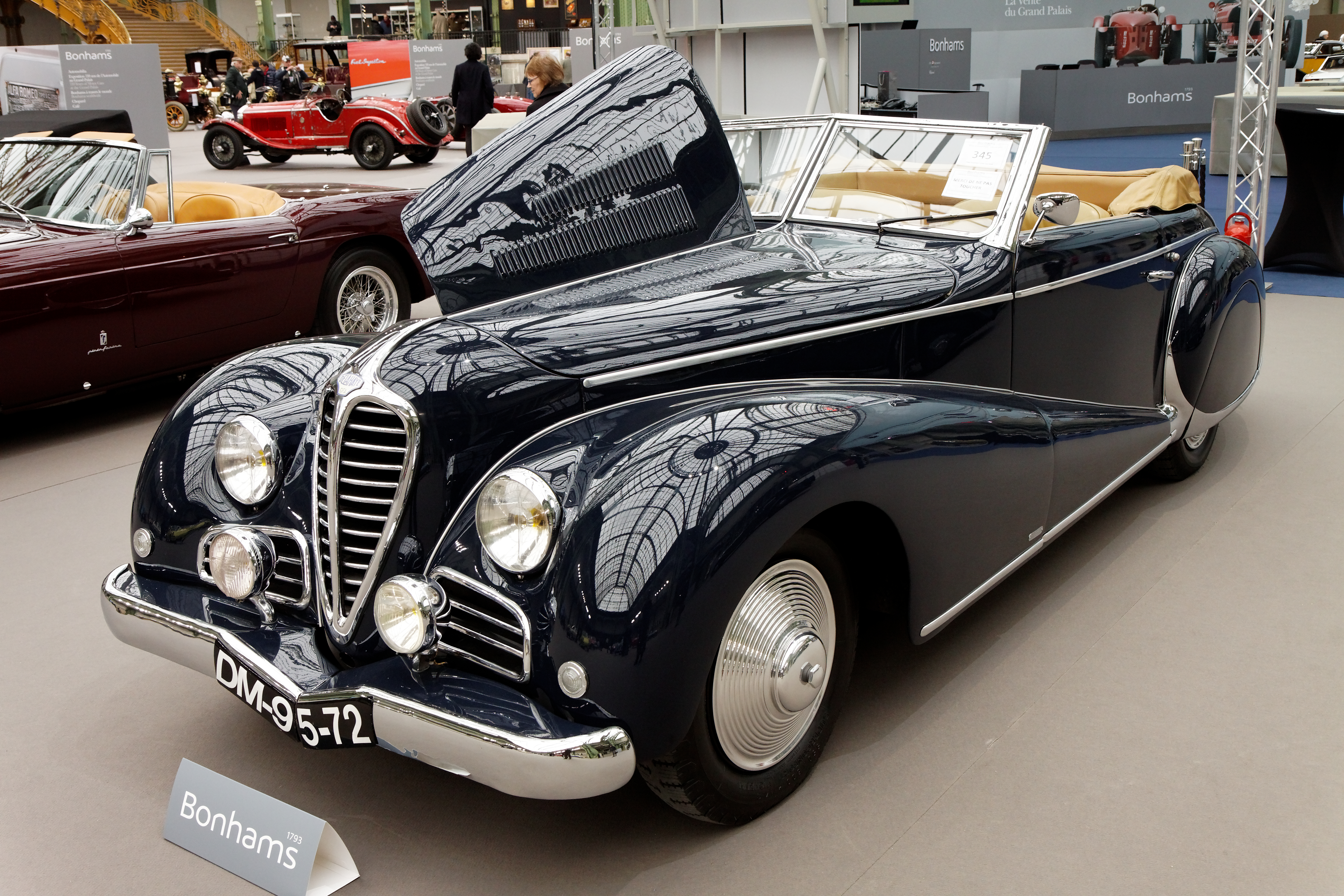
A Delahaye Type 135 M with a convertible body from Antem (1948)

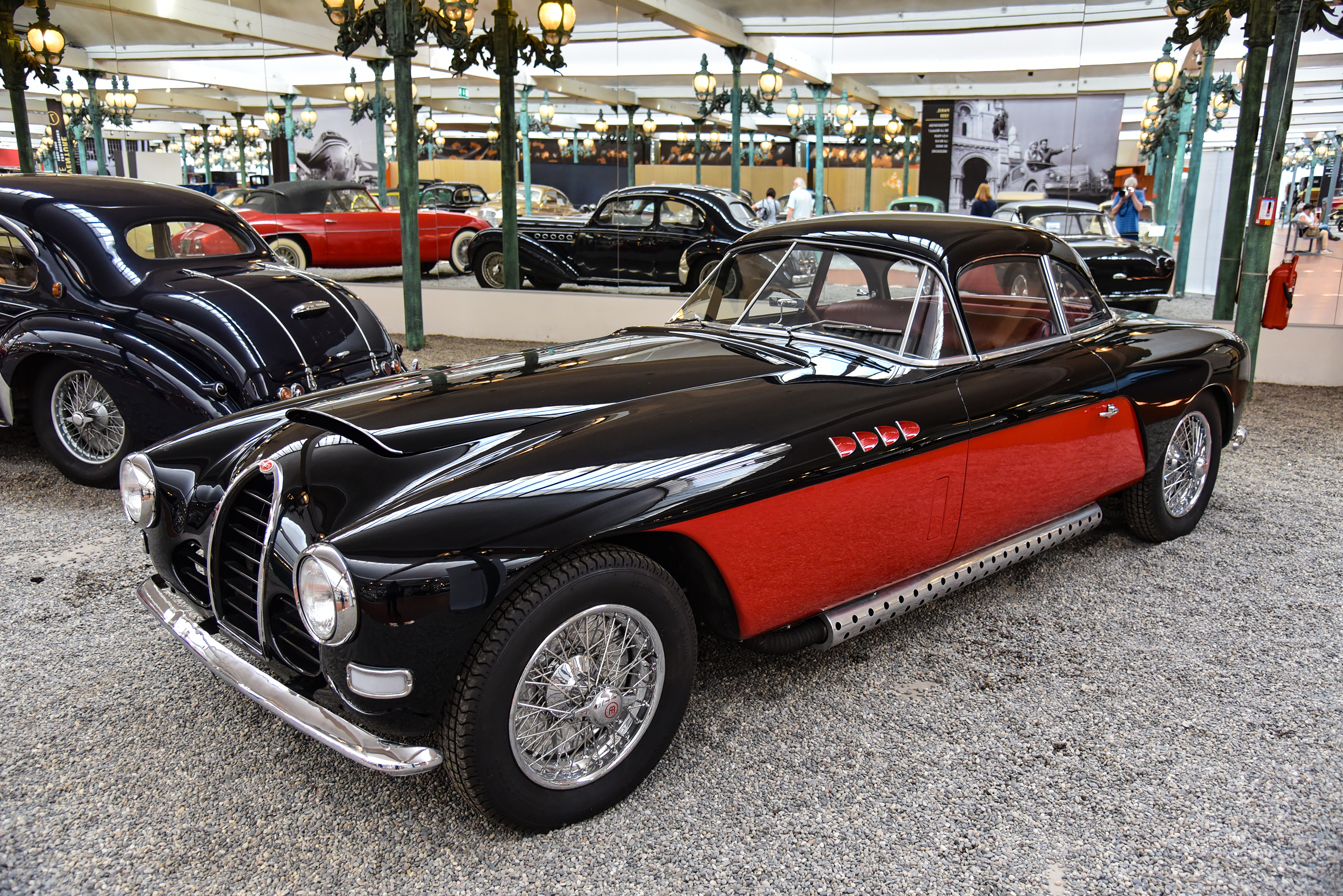
1951 Bugatti Type 101 Coupe by Antem

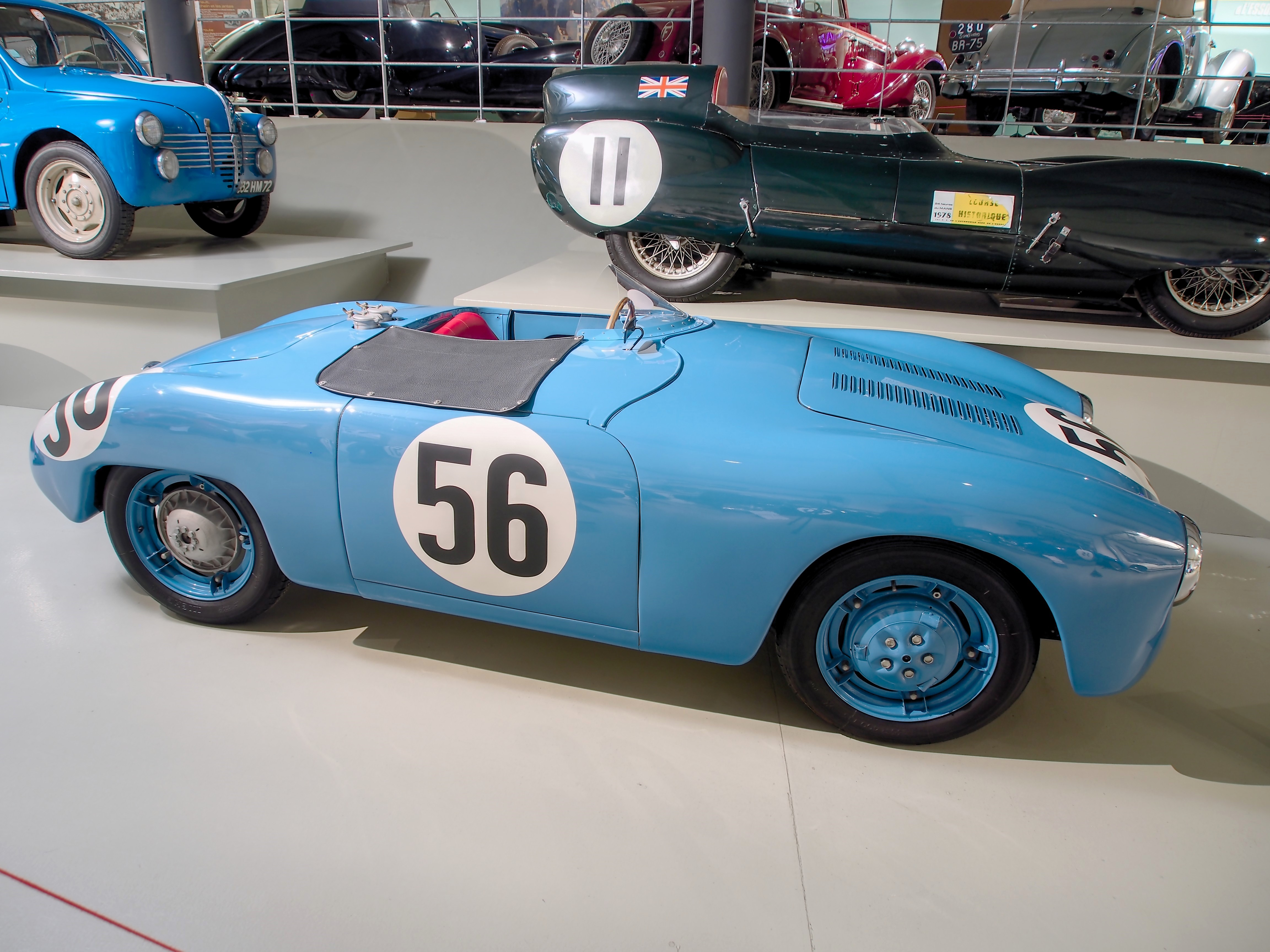
1951 DB Panhard Barquette with an Antem body

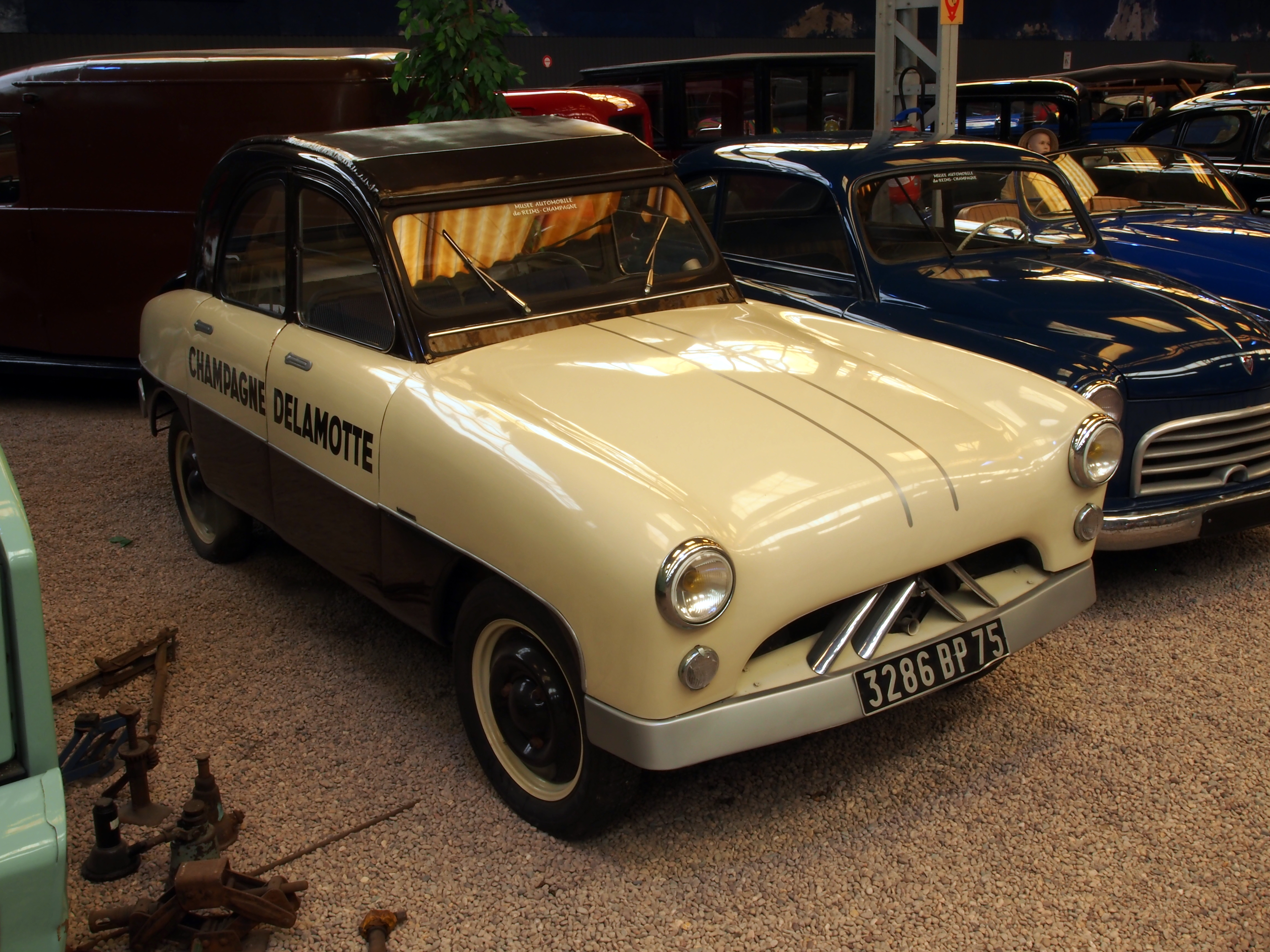
1953 Antem sedan based on a Citroën 2CV, designed by Philippe Charbonneaux

== Literature ==
- Serge Bellu: A French Touch of Class. Les Ateliers de carrosserie français, Éditions Nicolas Chaudun 2012, ISBN 978-2-35039-136-6
