= Bugatti Type 101 =

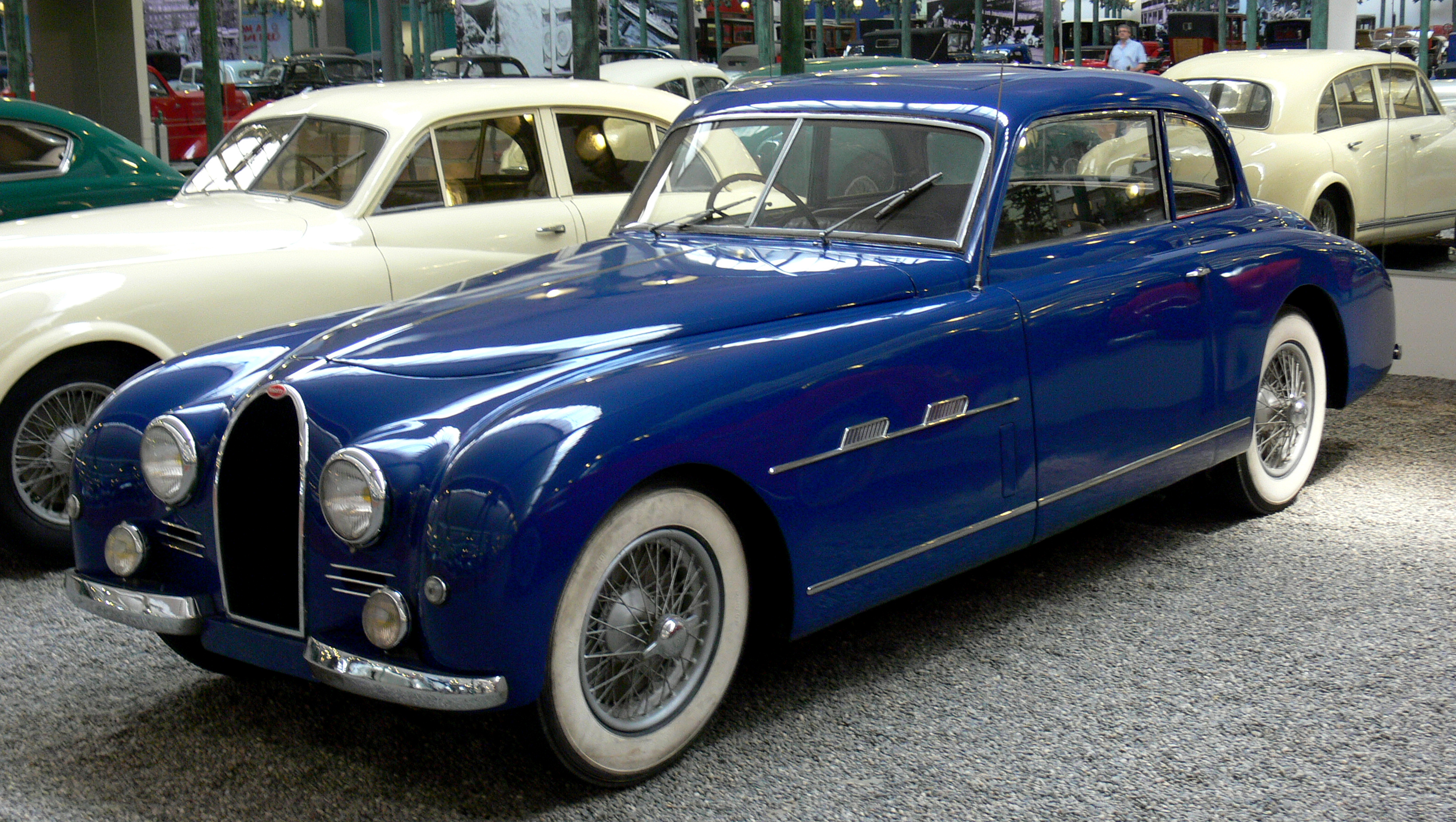
- 57454 (blue) & 101500 (cream)

Overview
- Manufacturer: Bugatti
- Production: 1951–1952; 1965; 8 units
- Assembly: France: Molsheim, Alsace (Usine Bugatti de Molsheim)

Body and chassis
- Class: Grand tourer
- Body style: 4-door saloon 2-door cabriolet 2-door coach coupé roadster
- Layout: FR layout
- Related: Bugatti Type 57

Powertrain
- Engine: 3,257 cc (3.257 L; 198.8 cu in) I8
- Transmission: 4-speed manual

Dimensions
- Wheelbase: 3.3 m (130 in)

The Bugatti Type 101 is a motor car made by Bugatti in 1951 and 1952 (one was built in 1965). In order to restart production after World War II and the deaths of Ettore Bugatti and his son Jean, the Type 101 was developed from the pre-war Type 57. Seven chassis were built; these were bodied by four different coachbuilders: Gangloff, Guilloré, Antem and Ghia, the last to a design by Virgil Exner. The 101 was powered by the 3.3 L (3,257 cc or 199 cu in) straight-8 from the Type 57.

== Production ==
Six Type 101 chassis were built after an initial converted Type 57 chassis prototype. At least two more Type 57s were also converted to Type 101 specifications, making a total of nine Type 101 cars produced. The last Type 101 was built in 1965 by Ghia designed by Virgil Exner for the last remaining Type 101 chassis. It was exhibited at the Turin Motor Show in an attempt to revive the marque, but financing could not be arranged and production plans were scrapped. Exner owned the car for many years, and it has lately appeared in public at the Pebble Beach Concours d'Elegance.

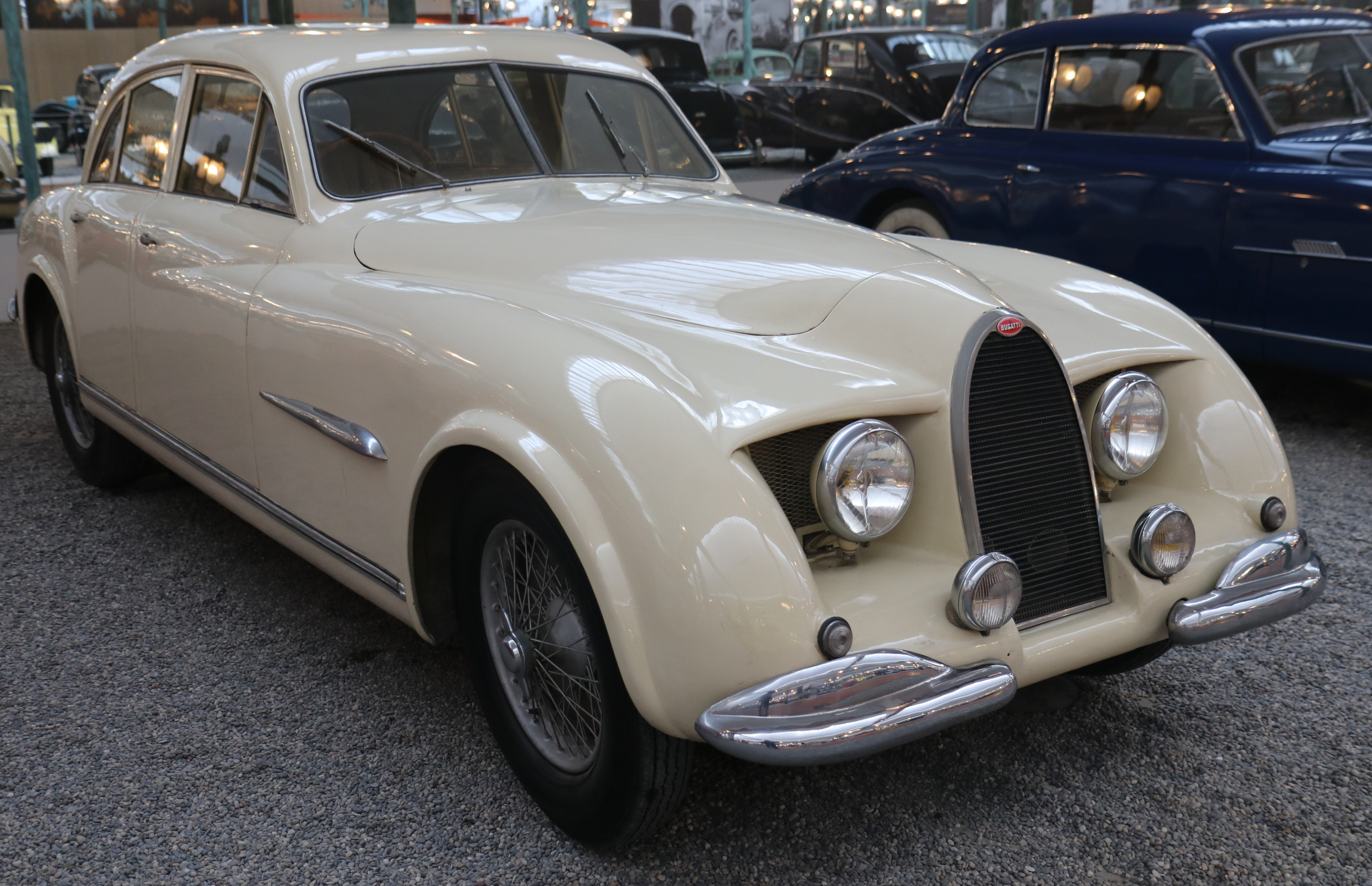
Bugatti Type 101 Guilloré 4-door saloon (101500)

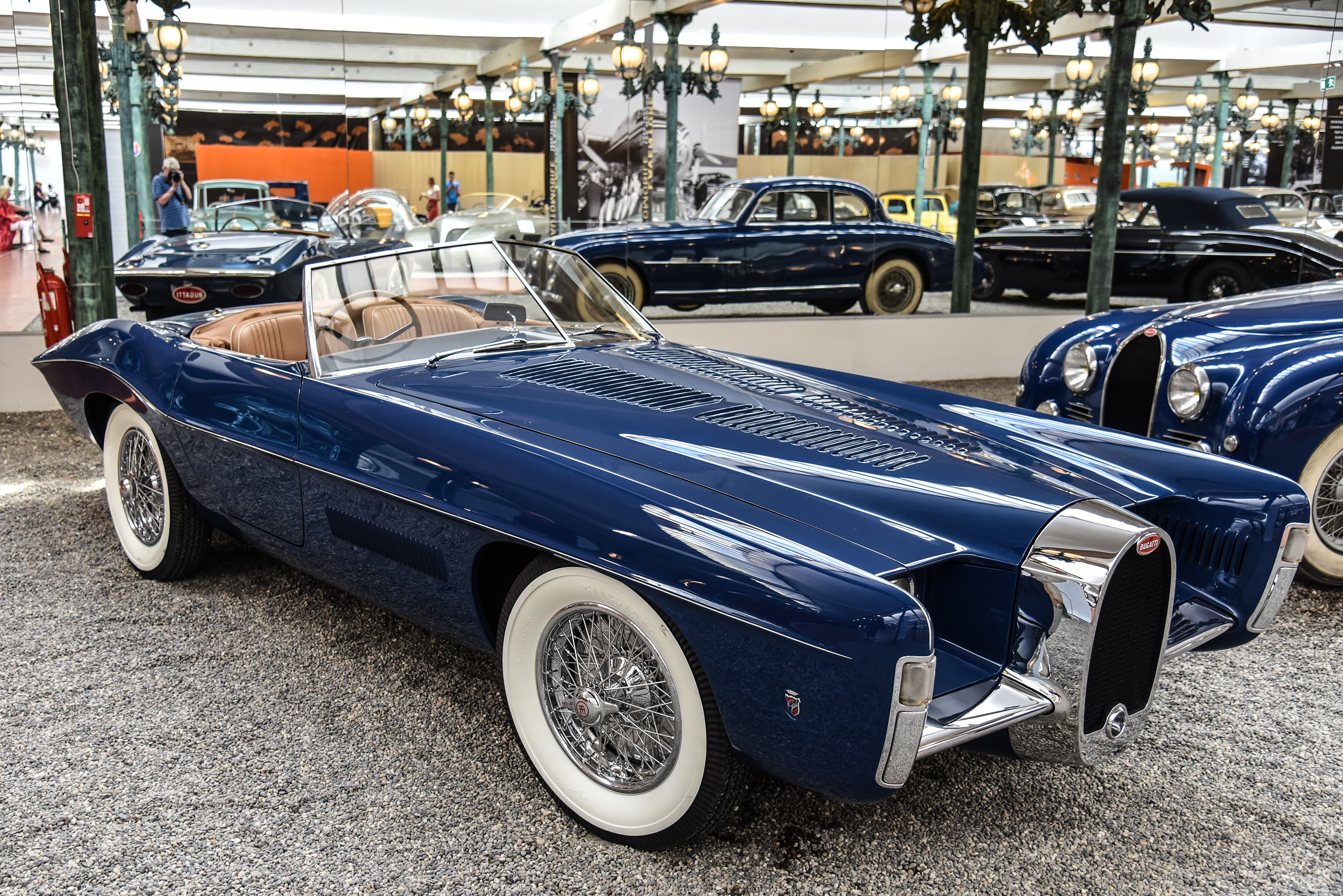
Bugatti Type 101 Virgil Exner/Ghia roadster (101506)

Year	Chassis Number	Body	Notes
1935	57299	Coupé	
1935	57314	Stelvio Cabriolet by Gangloff	Converted to Type 101 specification by the factory at the request of owner M. Dettwiler.
1951	57454	Gangloff coupé	This car was built on a converted Type 57 chassis and exhibited at the 1951 Paris Salon. Currently at the Schlumpf Collection with engine 101503 installed. Pictured above.
1952	101500	Guillore 4-door saloon	Cream-colored, with free-standing headlights. Currently at the Schlumpf Collection.
1952	101501	Gangloff cabriolet	Exhibited at the 1952 Paris Salon. Light blue repainted dark blue. Formerly of the Auto & Technik Museum in Sinsheim, Germany. Owned by the Pantheon museum in Basel, Switzerland, from 1988 to 2010, when Peter Mullin purchased it. Located at The Mullin Automotive Museum in Oxnard, California.
1952	101502	Guilloré 2-door coach	Dark blue with portholes, the body was possibly intended for a Delahaye. This was the only 101 body to feature separate wings instead of full-width bodywork. Sold for $269,265 at the Bonhams Rétromobile auction in Paris, 2008.
1952	101503	Gangloff cabriolet	Currently has engine 101504 installed and displayed at the Schlumpf Collection.
1951	101504	Antem coupé	Exhibited at the 1951 Paris Salon de l'Automobile but not sold until 1958. Owned by Bill Harrah and Nicolas Cage and now in the O'Quinn Collection since 2006.
1965	101506	Virgil Exner/Ghia roadster	Ghia shortened the chassis by 46 cm (18 in). Currently owned by William Lyon.

== Engine ==
Model	Year	Engine	Displacement	Power	Fuel system
T101	1951	straight-8 DOHC 16v	3257 cc	135 hp (101 kW)	Single carburetor
T101C	1951	straight-8 DOHC 16v	3257 cc	190 hp (142 kW)	Single carburetor, Roots supercharger
