= Bugatti Type 57 =

1930s automobile model

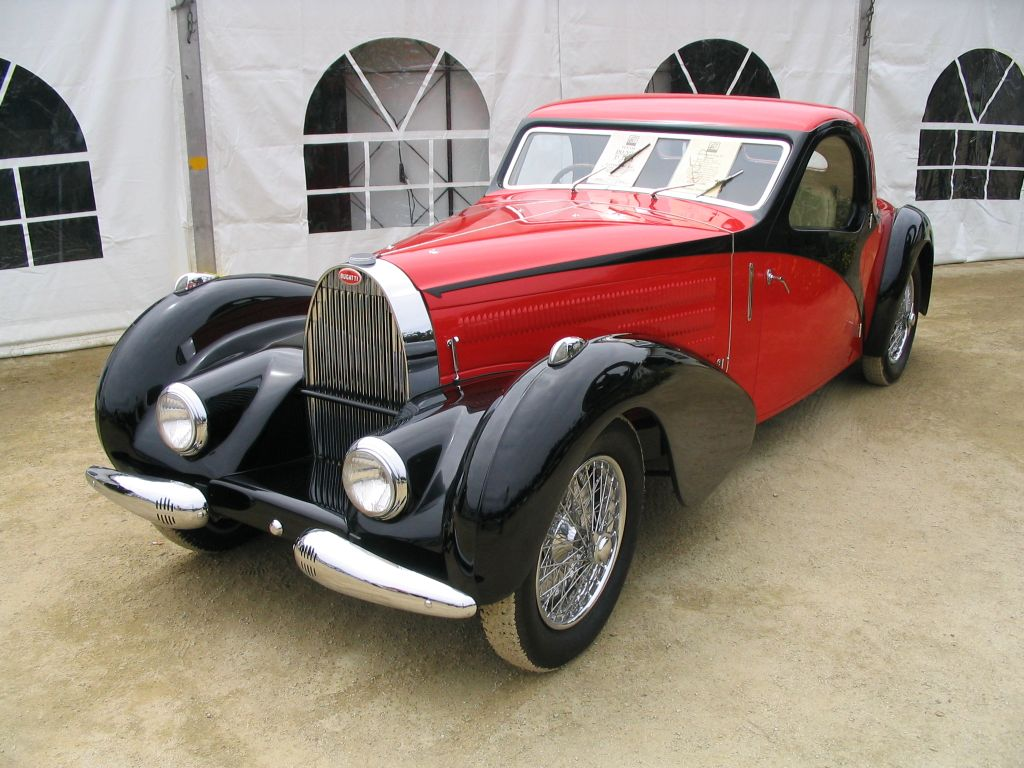
- 1936 Bugatti Type 57 Atalante

Overview
- Manufacturer: Bugatti
- Production: 1934–1940; 710 produced
- Assembly: France: Molsheim, Alsace (Usine Bugatti de Molsheim)
- Designer: Jean Bugatti

Body and chassis
- Class: Grand tourer

Powertrain
- Engine: 3,257 cc DOHC I8
- Transmission: 4-speed manual

Chronology
- Predecessor: Bugatti Type 49
- Successor: Bugatti Type 101

The Bugatti Type 57 and later variants (including the famous Atlantic and Atalante) was a grand tourer built from 1934 through 1940. It was an entirely new design created by Jean Bugatti, son of founder Ettore. A total of 710 Type 57s were produced.

Type 57s used a straight-8 twin-cam engine of 3.3 L (3257 cc/198 in³) displacement. Bore and stroke were 72 mm by 100 mm based on that of the Type 49 but heavily modified by Jean Bugatti, unlike the single cam engines of the Type 49 and earlier models. The engines of the Type 50, 51 used bevel gears at the front of the engine to transmit power from the crankshaft, whereas the Type 57 used a train of spur gears at the rear of the engine, with fiber gear wheels on the camshafts to achieve more silence in operation.

There were two basic variants of the Type 57 car:

- The original Type 57
- The lowered Type 57S/SC

The Type 57 chassis and engine was revived in 1951 as the Bugatti Type 101. A rediscovered Type 57 was sold for 3.4 million euros at auction on 7 February 2009 at a motor show in Paris.

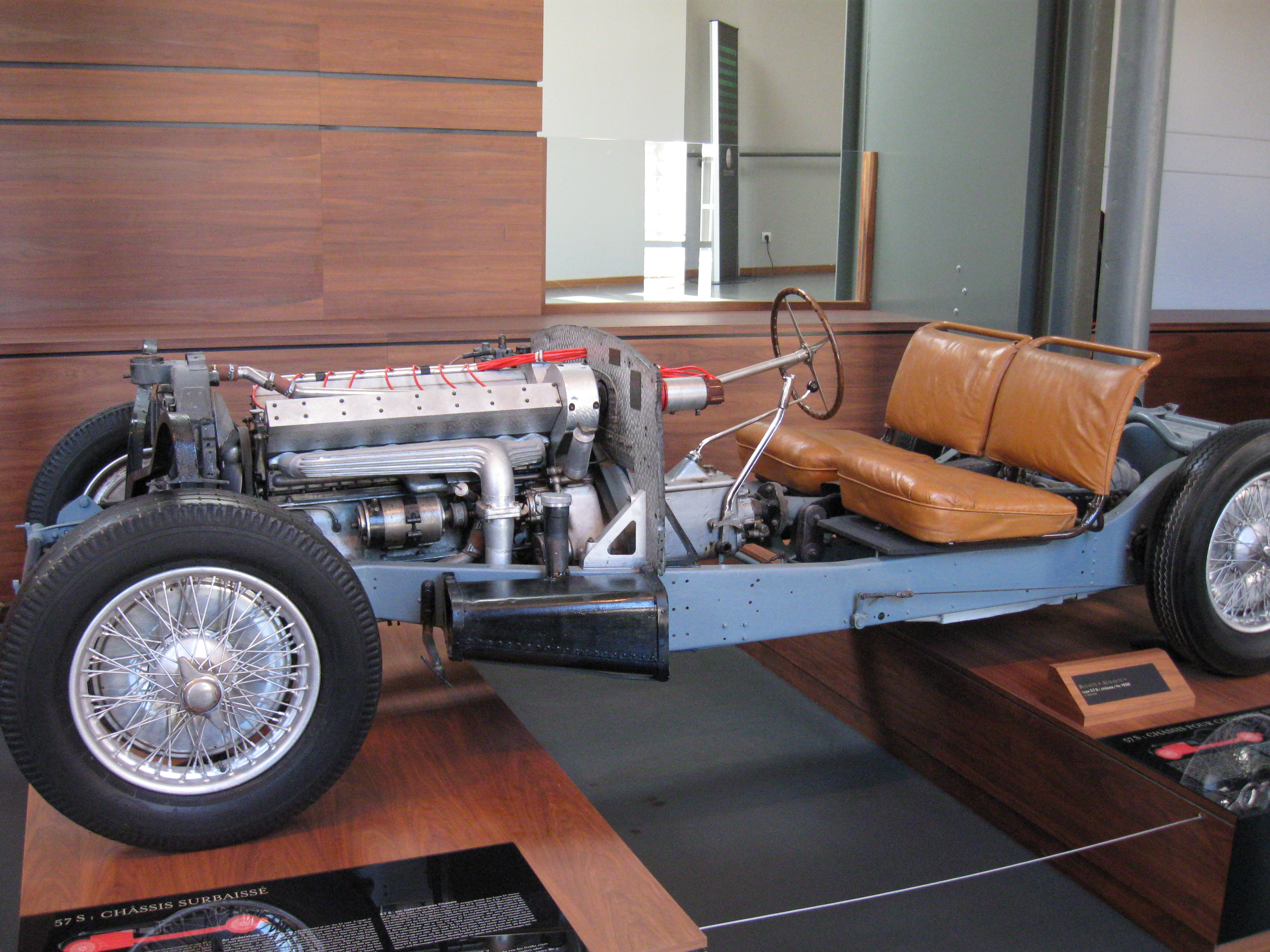
Bugatti Type 57 chassis

== Type 57 ==
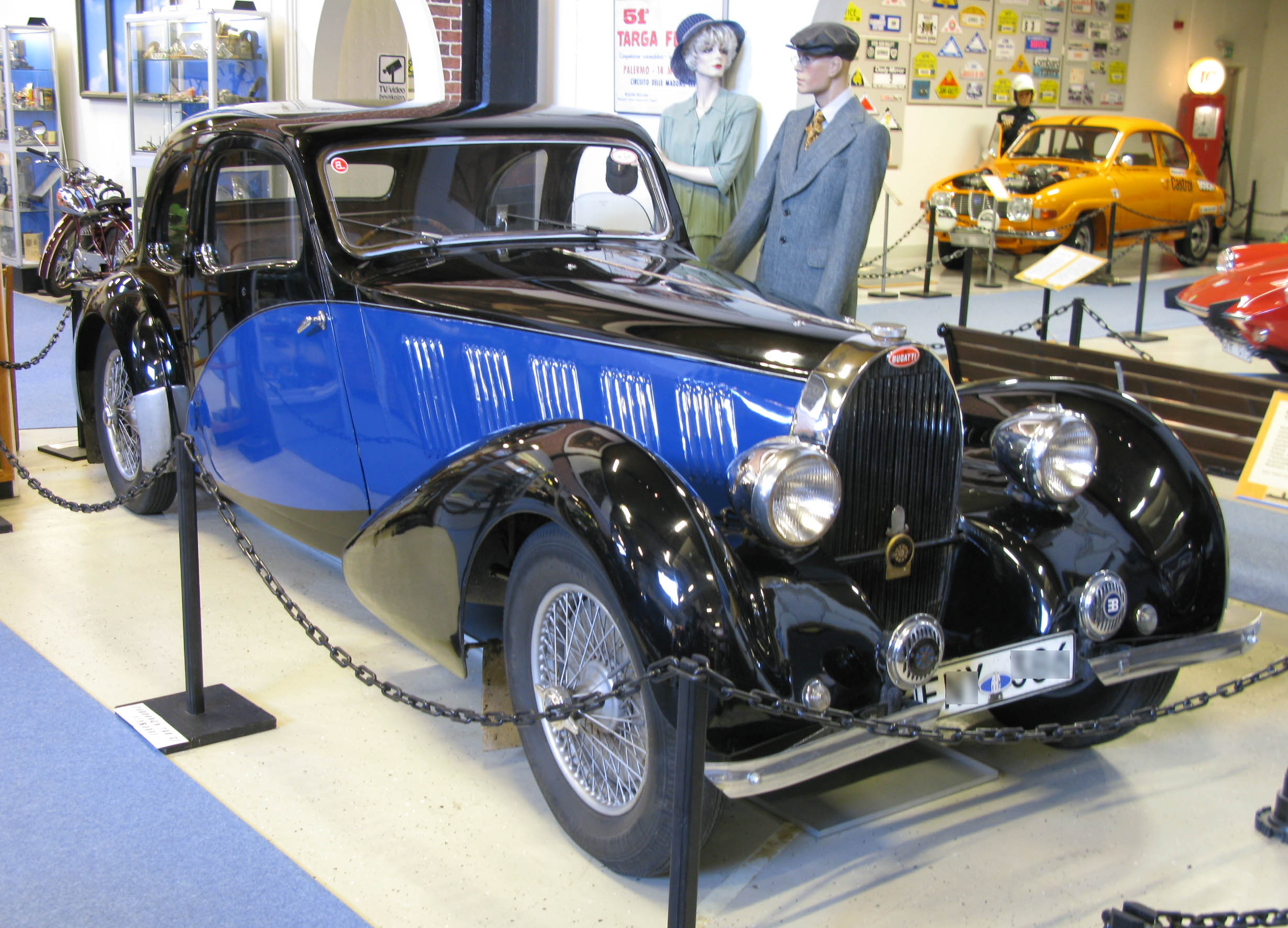
1936 Type 57 Coupé with bodywork by Graber of Switzerland

The original Type 57 was a touring car model produced from 1934 through 1940. It used the 3.3 L (3,257 cc; 198 cu in) engine from the Type 59 Grand Prix cars, producing 135 hp (100 kW). Top speed was 153 km/h (95 mph).

It rode on a 3,302 mm (130 in) wheelbase and had a 1,349 mm (53 in) wide track. Road-going versions weighed about 950 kg (2,090 lb). Hydraulic brakes replaced the cable-operated units in 1938, a modification Ettore Bugatti hotly contested. 630 examples were produced.

The original road-going Type 57 included a smaller version of the Royale's square-bottom horseshoe grille. The sides of the engine compartment were covered with thermostatically-controlled shutters.

Dimensions:

- Wheelbase: 3,302 mm (130 in)
- Track: 1,349 mm (53 in)
- Weight: 950 kg (2,090 lb)

=== Type 57T ===
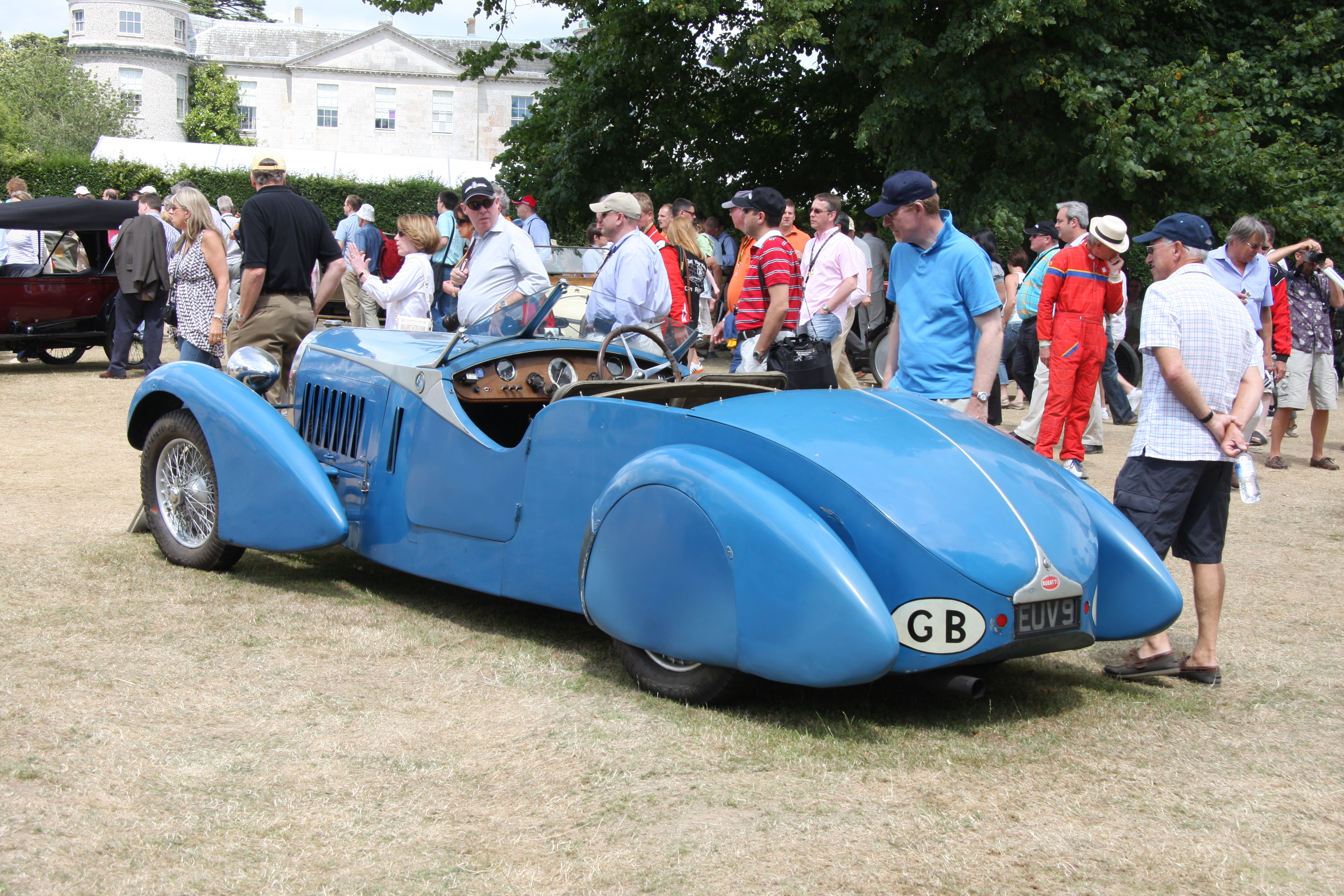
1935 Type 57T Tourer

The "tuned" Type 57T pushed the performance of the basic Type 57. It was capable of reaching 185 kilometres per hour (115 mph).

=== Type 57C ===
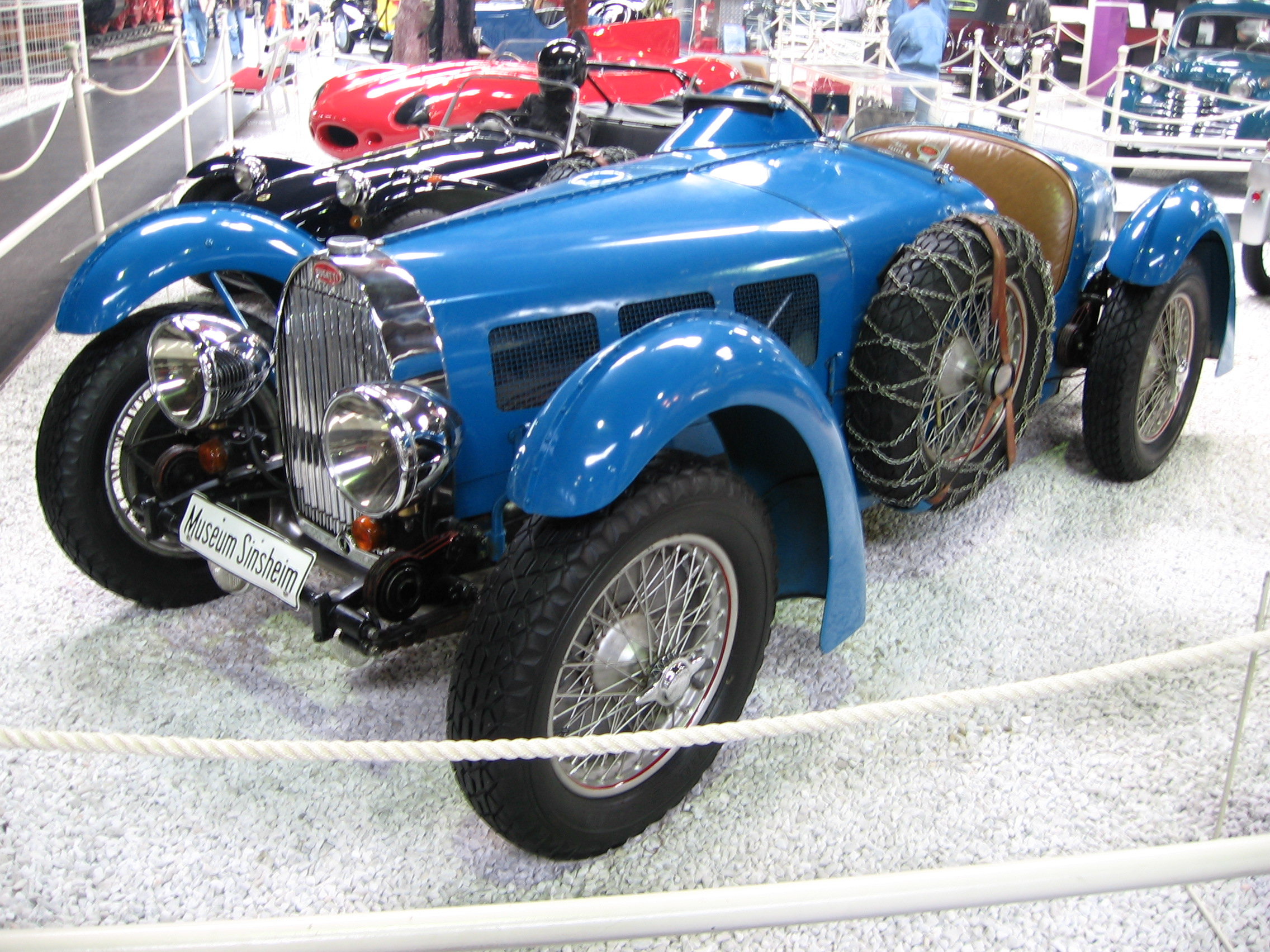
1938 Type 57C

A Type 57C racing car was built from 1937 through 1940, with about 96 produced. It shared the 3.3 L engine from the road-going Type 57 but produced 160 hp (119 kW) with a Roots-type supercharger fitted.

=== Type 57G Tank ===
The 2nd incarnation Tank, this time based on the Type 57C, won Le Mans again in 1939. Shortly afterwards, Jean Bugatti took the winning car for a test on the Molsheim-Strasbourg road, on 11 August. Swerving to avoid a drunken bicyclist on the closed road, Bugatti crashed the car and died at age 30.

== Type 57S/SC ==
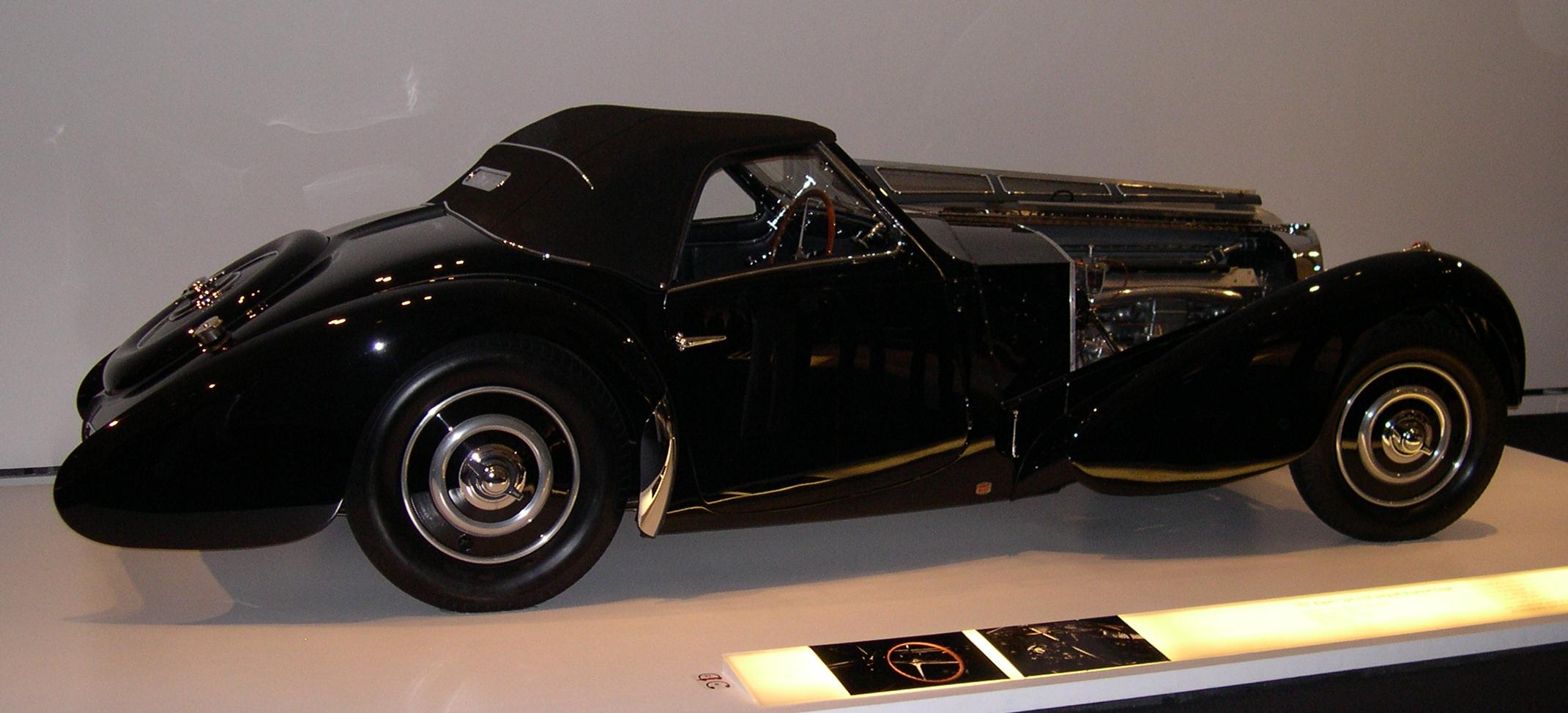
1937 Type 57SC Gangloff Drop Head Coupé from the Ralph Lauren collection

The Type 57S/SC variants are some of the most iconic Bugatti cars. The "S" stood for "Surbaissé" ("Lowered") and the "C" for "Compresseur" (a supercharger introduced by Bugatti as a result of customers' desire for increased power). It included a V-shaped dip at the bottom of the radiator and mesh grilles on either side of the engine compartment.

Lowering the car was a major undertaking. The rear axle now passed through the rear frame rather than riding under it, and a dry-sump lubrication system was required to fit the engine under the new low hood. The 57S had a nearly-independent suspension in front, though Ettore despised that notion.

Just 43 "Surbaissé" cars and only two supercharged Type 57SC's were originally manufactured. But most 57S owners wanted the additional power afforded by the blower. Therefore, most of the original Type 57S cars returned to Molsheim for the installation of a supercharger, pushing output from 170 hp (125 kW) to 200 hp (147 kW) and top speed from 125 mph (201 km/h) to 135 mph (217 km/h).

Dimensions:

- Wheelbase: 2,979 mm (117 in)
- Track: 1,349 mm (53 in)
- Weight: 950 kg (2,090 lb)

=== Type 57S/SC "Aérolithe" concept and Atlantic production cars ===
The Type 57S Atlantic body featured flowing coupé lines with a pronounced dorsal seam running from the front to the back end of the vehicle. It was based on the 1935 Aérolithe concept car designed by Jean Bugatti which was built on a prototype chassis, more specifically, a standard Type 57 chassis shortened to what would eventually become the Type 57S chassis. Like the Type 59 Grand Prix car, the Aérolithe used Elektron composite for its body panels, known for being a very lightweight and durable material, but also for being extremely flammable when exposed to high temperatures. Therefore, being unable to weld the body panels, the engineers riveted them externally, a technique frequently used in the aviation industry, thus creating the signature seam.

However, the production Atlantics, just four built, used plain aluminium, but the dorsal seams were retained for style and have led to the car's present fame. Three of the original four Atlantics are known to survive and each had been restored. Two of them were awarded "Best of Show" awards at the Pebble Beach Concours d'Elegance in 1990 and 2003, respectively.

The model was named after Jean Bugatti's friend, French pilot Jean Mermoz, one of the pioneers in aviation and the first to cross the South Atlantic by air. In December 1936, he and his crew crashed into the Atlantic Ocean after a supposed engine failure. Originally, the Atlantic model was named "Coupé Aero" after its predecessor, the Type 57 Aérolithe. The first two production units already bore that name, but after hearing the tragic news, Jean Bugatti commissioned to change the name of the model to "Atlantic Coupé".

Bugatti's past during the pre-war and World War II era is often considered as being somewhat imprecise. Therefore, initially, it was believed that only three Atlantic cars were manufactured, as the popular belief hinged on the idea of No. 57453 (2nd Atlantic) and No. 57473 (3rd Atlantic) being the same car, for they were closely related in terms of production date and both being painted black by the Bugatti factory. However, in 2004, renowned Bugatti historian Pierre-Yves Laugier confirmed their separate identities, a research thoroughly comprised in his book entitled "Bugatti: les 57 Sport", along with an elaborate illustration of each vehicle's past.

==== 1935 Bugatti Type 57 Aérolithe Chassis No. 57331 Prototype ====
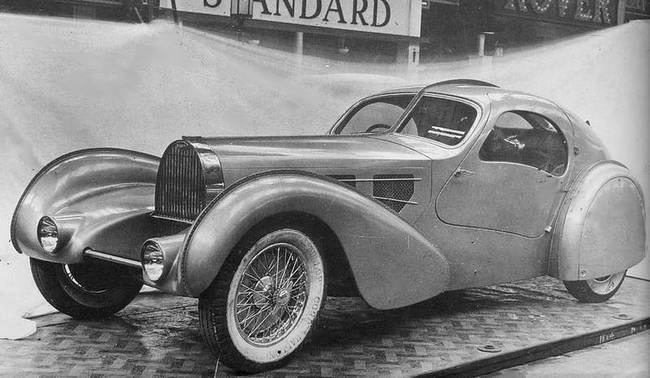
1935 Bugatti No. 57331 prototype on display at the 1935 British International Motor Show

Code-named the "Elektron Coupé" or "Competition Coupé" at launch, this Bugatti prototype had a very short existence. It was finished around the end of July 1935 and only four months later, it made its first public appearance at the Paris Motor Show. The car was a faithful recreation of Jean Bugatti's stunning Art Deco-inspired "SuperProfile coupé" design, but due to its seemingly bizarre shape, the vehicle has brought attention to a very limited audience, thus there were only four Atlantics built the years after. A few people, however, had the chance to sit in the vehicle next to Bugatti race driver William Grover-Williams while he offered them a "quick" tour of Paris and were surprised by the vehicle's performance and looks, so they called it "La Aérolithe" after the phrase "Rapide comme une aérolithe" ("Fast as a meteorite"), a name that was later adopted by Bugatti.

A few weeks later, the vehicle was displayed at the British International Motor Show in Olympia, London. The prototype remained in London until the spring of 1936, being frequently driven and tested by William Grover-Williams. Beyond this point, historians lose its tracks, but as Bugatti's chief mechanic Robert Aumaître stated a few decades later, the car was, essentially, just a styling concept with no technical interest, thus being transported back to France at the Bugatti factory where it was disassembled for components.

Over the span of five years, from 2008 to 2013, Canadian car restoration team from The Guild of Automotive Restorers, led by David Grainger, had built a 1:1 exact replica of the Type 57 Aérolithe, having only 11 photographs, 2 blueprints and a painting at their disposal from which they gathered all the dimensions of the vehicle. It was built on the No. 57104 chassis and its body was crafted entirely out of Elektron alloy.

==== 1936 Bugatti Type 57S(+C) Coupé Aero Chassis No. 57374 ====
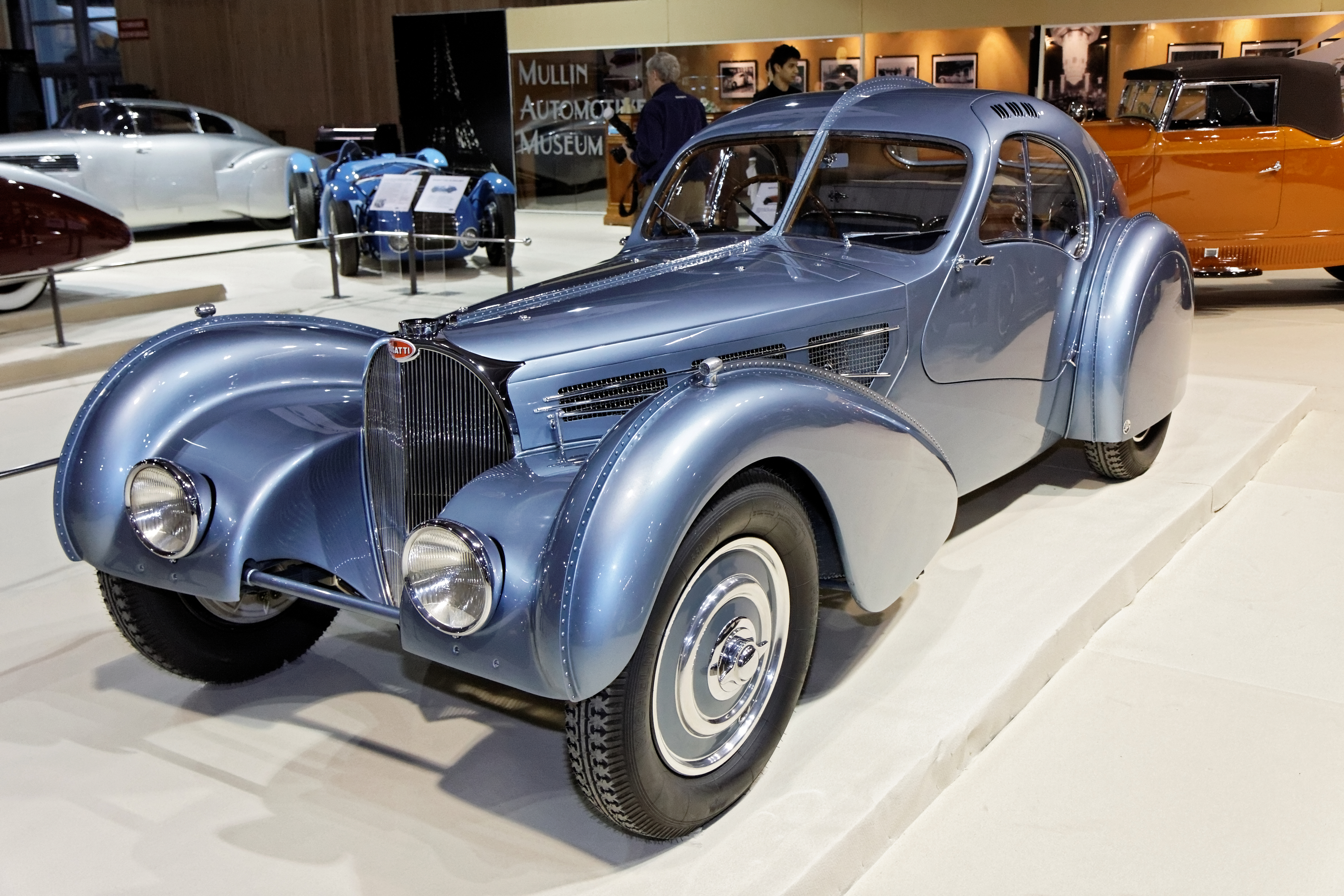
1936 Bugatti No. 57374 from the Mullin collection

It was completed on 2 September 1936 and sold to Victor Rothschild, 3rd Baron Rothschild. Painted a metallic gray-blue, No. 57374 was supposedly built using various components from the Aérolithe prototype, the most notable being the chromed elements on either side of the engine grille. In 1939, at the request of Victor Rothschild, the car was brought back to Molsheim in order to have the "C" specification supercharger fitted. He used the car until October 1941, when he abandoned it in the middle of a field after the engine exploded when the supercharger malfunctioned.

It was sold to a mechanic, who repaired it without the supercharger. In 1945, a wealthy American doctor who had just arrived in England bought the car, and a year later he brought it to the US and sold it to Bugatti enthusiast Mike Oliver. He brought the car up to U.S. specifications and painted it a dark red. In 1953, Oliver shipped the car to Bugatti and had a replacement supercharger fitted.

Before Oliver died in 1970 he sold the car to Briggs Cunningham, American entrepreneur, championship car racer, and pilot, owner of the "Costa Mesa" car collection. A year later it was sold for $59,000 to collector Peter Williamson, who owned it for 32 years, during which time he returned the car to its original state. Eventually, it was exhibited at the 2003 Pebble Beach Concours d'Elegance where it won the "Best of Show" award.

Williamson died in 2004, and No. 57374 was sold in 2010 to a private collector associated with the former Mullin Automotive Museum in Oxnard, California, for $30 million.

==== 1936 Bugatti Type 57SC Coupé Aero Chassis No. 57453 ====
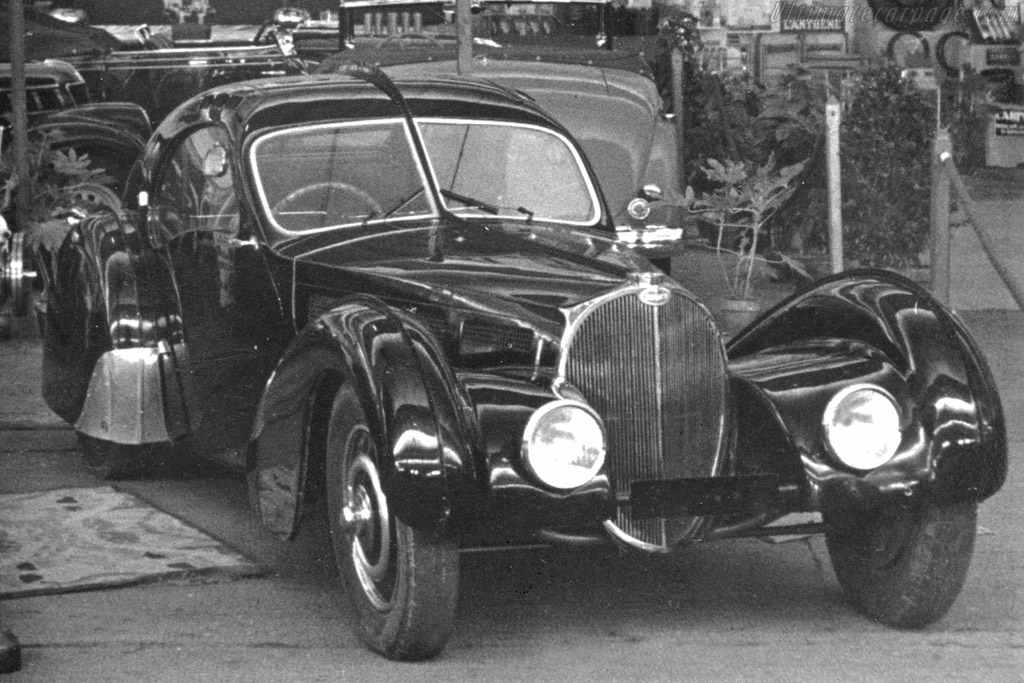
1936 Bugatti No. 57453 on display at the 1937 Nice Motor Show

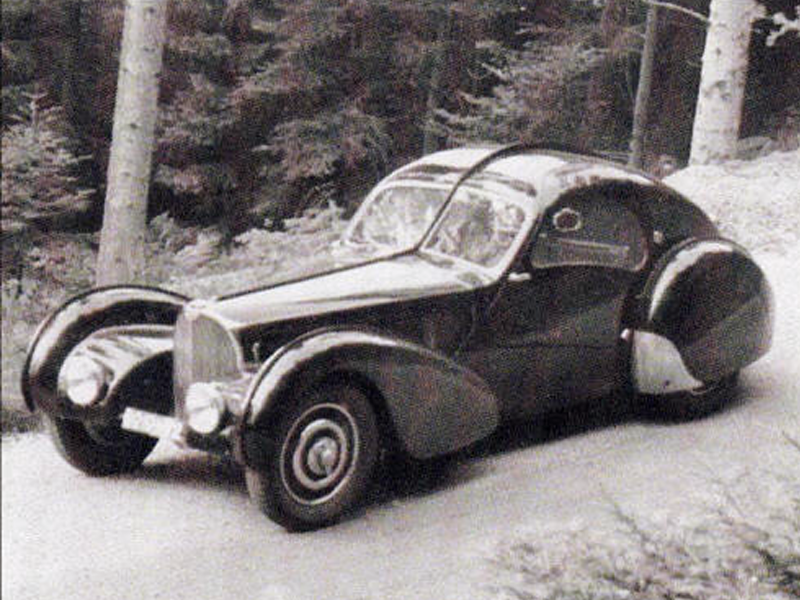
1936 Bugatti No. 57453 "La Voiture Noire" in Alsace, France

Also known as "La Voiture Noire" (French for "The Black Car"), this is the second Atlantic that was manufactured. Apart from its first years after production, the car's history and current whereabouts remain mostly unknown. Due to its past and exclusivity, experts had estimated the value of this car at around $114 million.

On 10 March 1936, Greek racing driver Nico E. Embiricos ordered a Bugatti Type 57S Coupé Aero bearing chassis No. 57375 and engine No. 3S which was completed on 24 August 1936 and then shipped to his residence in London. By some unclear reason, once received, the car was sent to Corsica Coachworks for the conversion to a two-seater convertible racing body, this process coming to an end on 4 September 1936. The Coupé Aero bodywork was sent back to the Bugatti workshop, where it was eventually mounted on chassis No. 57453 with engine No. 2SC.

Being the only Atlantic already fitted with the "C" specification supercharger straight from the factory, No. 57453 was completed on 3 October 1936. During the winter of the same year, the car was mostly driven by Jean Bugatti, racing driver William Grover-Williams and his wife, Yvonne. Subsequently, No. 57453 was photographed for the company's 1937 promotional catalogue and was also exhibited at the Nice and Lyon Motor Shows in the spring of 1937.

Brought back to Molsheim, it was proudly driven by Jean Bugatti until the end of July, when he offered it as a gift to Bugatti race driver Robert Benoist after winning the 1937 24 Hours of Le Mans race. Being a very close friend with the Grover-Williamses, Benoist used the car alongside them. In the spring of 1940, all three of them fled to England before the Germans took over France and the car was returned to the factory. Even though it was frequently driven, No. 57453 never had a registered owner. The last mention about it was on a list of cars that were to be sent via a train to Rue Alfred Daney in Bordeaux on 18 February 1941, during the French exodus, being registered "1244 W5" and bearing chassis No. 57454.

Jean Bugatti, who died on 11 August 1939 at the age of 30 in a car crash, often considered the Atlantic model and most notably No. 57453, as his most innovative and most valuable creation. Thus, at the 2019 Geneva Motor Show, commemorating the 110-year anniversary of both Jean Bugatti and the brand, Bugatti introduced the one-off model "La Voiture Noire" which was sold to an anonymous buyer for $19 million. According to the Bugatti stylistic team, the vehicle is the ultimate Grand Tourer, but also as a modern representation of No. 57453 and a tribute to Jean Bugatti's stylistic genius.

== 1939 Bugatti Type 57SC "Shah", coach by Carrosserie Vanvooren ==
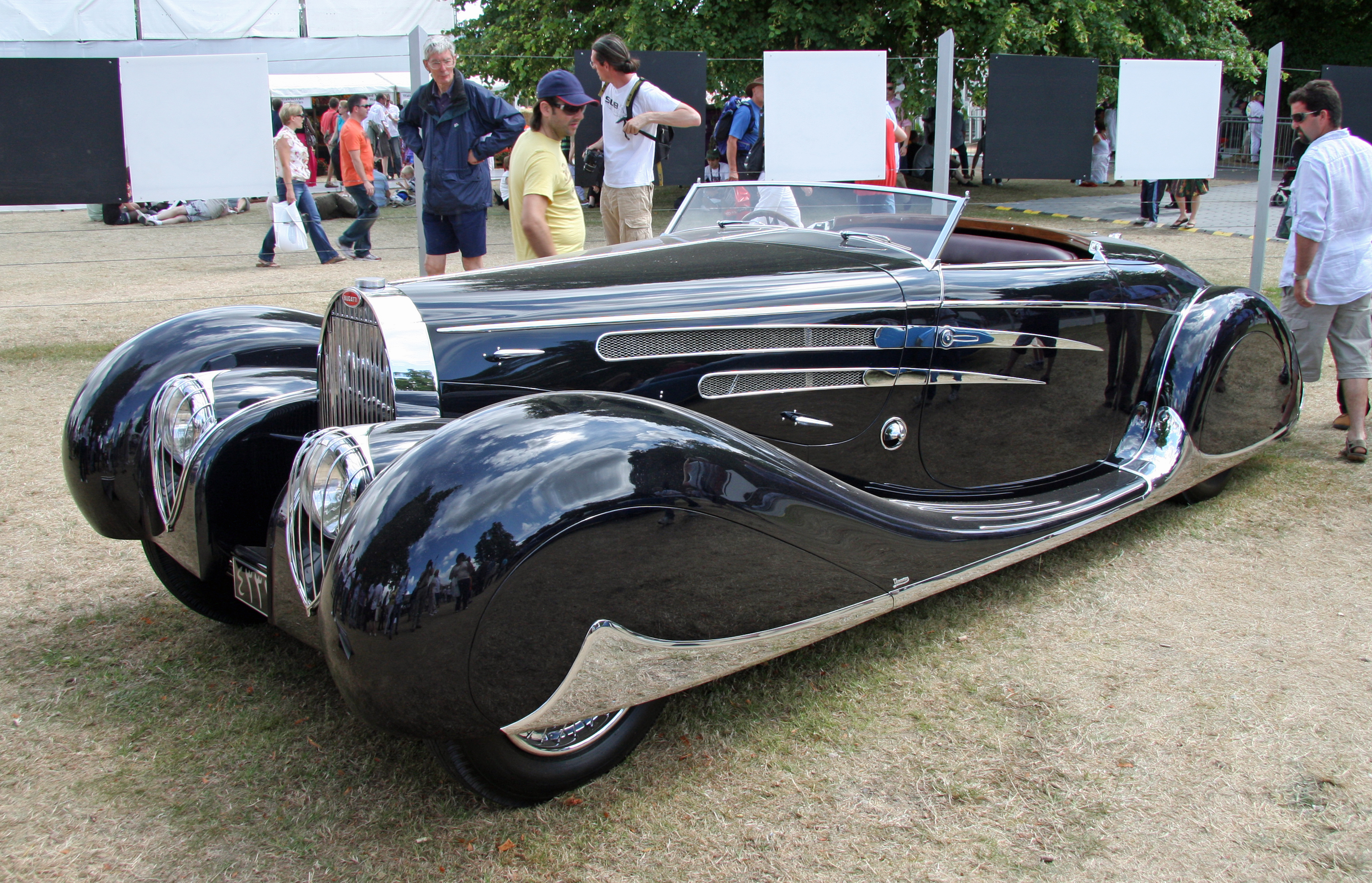
1939 Bugatti Type 57SC "Shah", coach by Carrosserie Vanvooren

=== 1936 Bugatti Type 57S Atlantic Coupé Chassis No. 57473 ===
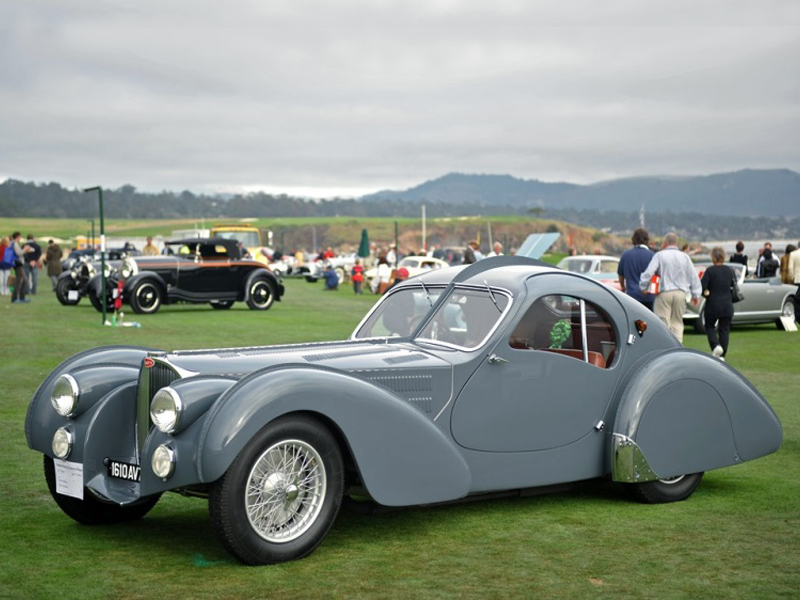
1936 Bugatti No. 57473 on display at the Pebble Beach Concours d'Elegance in 2010

Succeeding No. 57453, this second black Atlantic was finished on 13 December 1936 and was delivered to Parisian businessman, Jacques Holtzschuch. A few months later, while driving along the French Riviera, he and his wife, Yvonne, entered the "Juan-Les-Pins Concours d'Elegance" event where the vehicle received the "Grand Prix d'Honneur" award. Subsequently, between 1939 and 1941, the car received significant styling changes, so No. 57473 differs from the other Atlantics. The author of this coachwork is believed to be Italian designer Giuseppe Figoni.

Eventually, Holtzschuch and his wife were captured and killed by Nazis by the end of World War II and the car was purchased alongside their Monaco mansion by Cannes businessman and mechanic Robert Verkerke in 1949. This owner entered the car in the "3rd International Speed Circuit for touring cars series" race in Nice, but failed to finish. Over the next couple of years, No. 57473 had more than three additional owners. In 1952, it was sold to Bugatti enthusiast René Chatard who commissioned to have it painted pale blue.

On 22 August 1955, Chatard and Janine Vacheron, a female companion, were driving the car near Gien, France, when they were hit by a train. Neither survived the crash and the vehicle was sold to a scrap trader in Gien. The remains of the car were purchased in 1963 by a French collector who began a full reconstruction which culminated in 1977. As a result of the severe deterioration, most of the original components were replaced with new ones, therefore the value of the car decreased substantially.

In November 2006, No. 57473 was bought by an anonymous collector, who decided that the vehicle should be thoroughly restored by American specialist Paul Russell and brought back to Chatard's specification. In 2010, the finished car was exhibited at the Pebble Beach Concours d'Elegance event, where it didn't win any prize, being considered a replica. Today, No. 57473 is one among other classic cars displayed at the Torrota private collection in Spain.

=== 1938 Bugatti Type 57S(+C) Atlantic Coupé Chassis No. 57591 ===
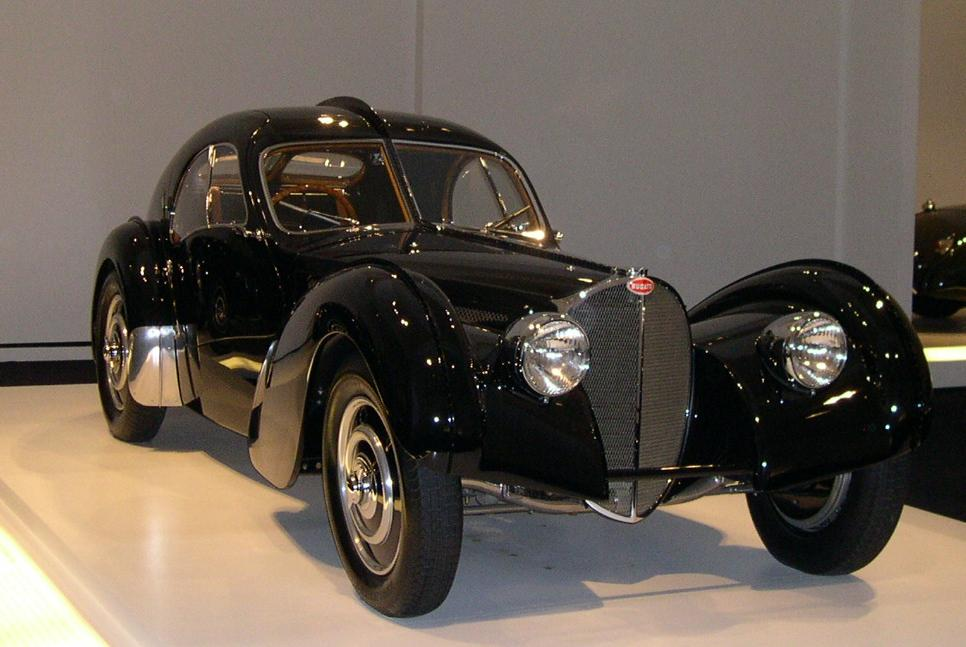
1938 Bugatti No. 57591 from the Ralph Lauren collection

This final production Atlantic was built for British tennis player Richard B. Pope, delivered to him on 2 May 1938 before being registered "EXK6", as it's commonly referred to. Painted a rich sapphire blue, No. 57591 distinguished itself from the other Atlantics mostly by the "facelift" at the front end and the absence of the rear fender covers.

In 1939, Richard Pope sent the car back to Molsheim at the Bugatti factory to have the "C" specification fitted. He kept the car for nearly 30 years, sometimes loaning his Atlantic to Bugatti specialist Barrie Price. Eventually, Price bought the car in 1967 and had it in its possession for 10 years. In the meantime, No. 57591 suffered a light crash during a commemoration which led to it getting stuck in a ditch. The car was handed to wealthy businessman Anthony Bamford and, shortly after, was given to another collector.

Eventually, fashion designer Ralph Lauren bought the car in 1988, and then commissioned a complete restoration with Paul Russell and Co. They restored the car to its 1938 condition, although it was painted black at Lauren's request. The car was given the "Best of Show" award at Pebble Beach in 1990 and "Best of Show" at Villa d'Este in 2013.

Shawn Henry evaluated 57591 at $100m.

=== Type 57S/SC Atalante ===
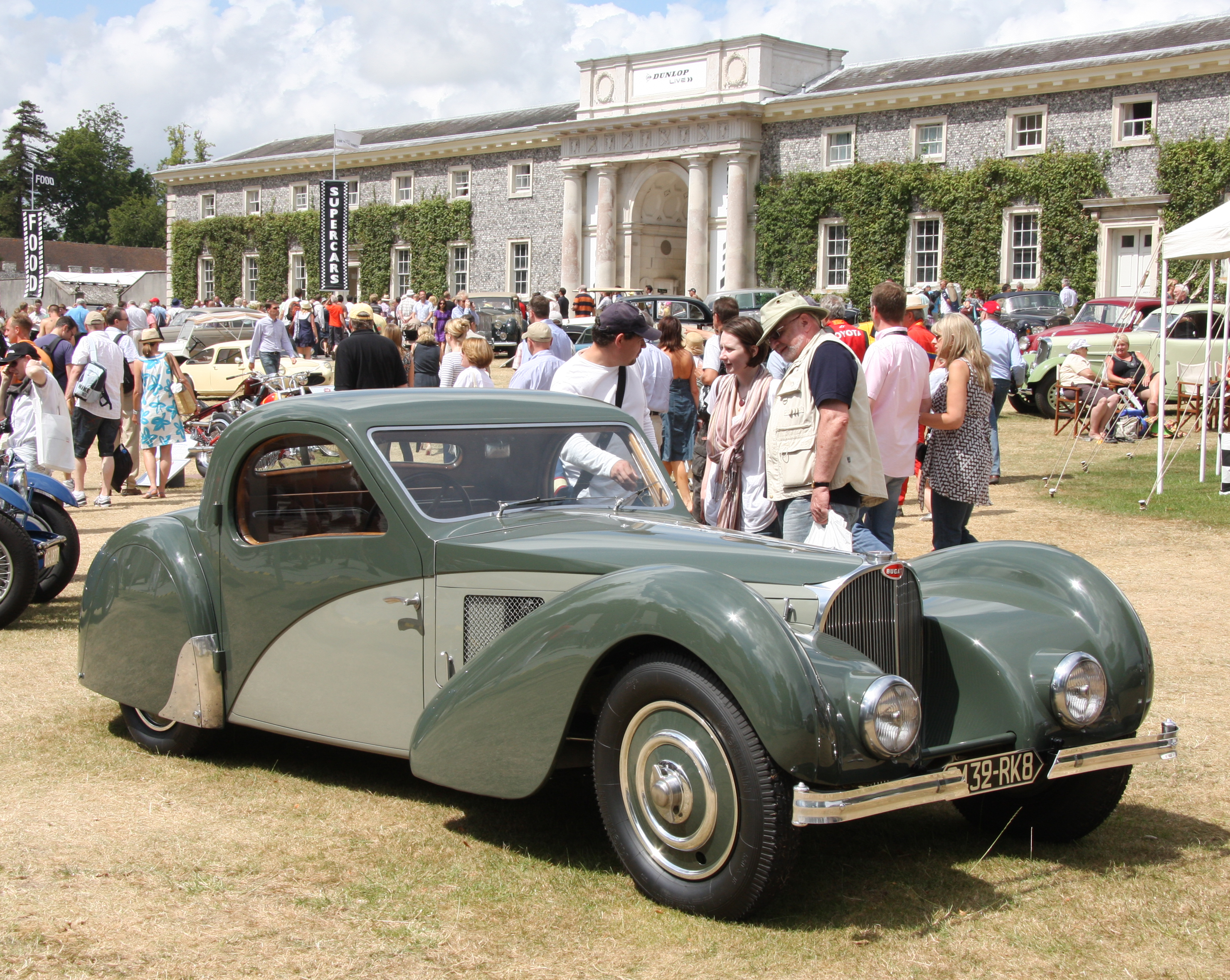
Type 57SC Atalante

The Atalante was a two-door coupé body style similar to and built after the Atlantic, both built on the 57S chassis, but with a single-piece windscreen and no fin. The name "Atalante" was derived from a heroine of Greek mythology, Atalanta. Only 17 Atalante cars were made, four of which reside in the Cité de l'Automobile Museum in Mulhouse, France (formerly known as the Musée National de L'Automobile de Mulhouse).

One Atalante, chassis number 57784, a 3-seater vehicle version with aluminium bodywork made by Vanvooren of the iconic Bugatti Type 57S model, resides in the Museu do Caramulo in Caramulo, Portugal. Vanvooren would do two more bodies alike, one (Chassis 57808) for the French government, who gave it, in 1939, as a marriage gift for Prince Mohammad Reza and Princess Fawzia, and another one (Chassis 57749). These two cars are in private collections in the United States.

==== Rediscovered Type 57S Atalante ====
In 2008, the Bugatti Type 57S with chassis number 57502 (built in 1937 with the Atalante coachwork for Francis Curzon, 5th Earl Howe) was discovered in a private garage in Newcastle upon Tyne, having been stored untouched for 48 years and known only by a few people. It was auctioned in February 2009 at the Rétromobile motor show in Paris, France, fetching €3.4 million.

=== Type 57S45 ===
A special Type 57S45 used a 4,743 cc engine like the Tank.

=== Type 57G Tank ===
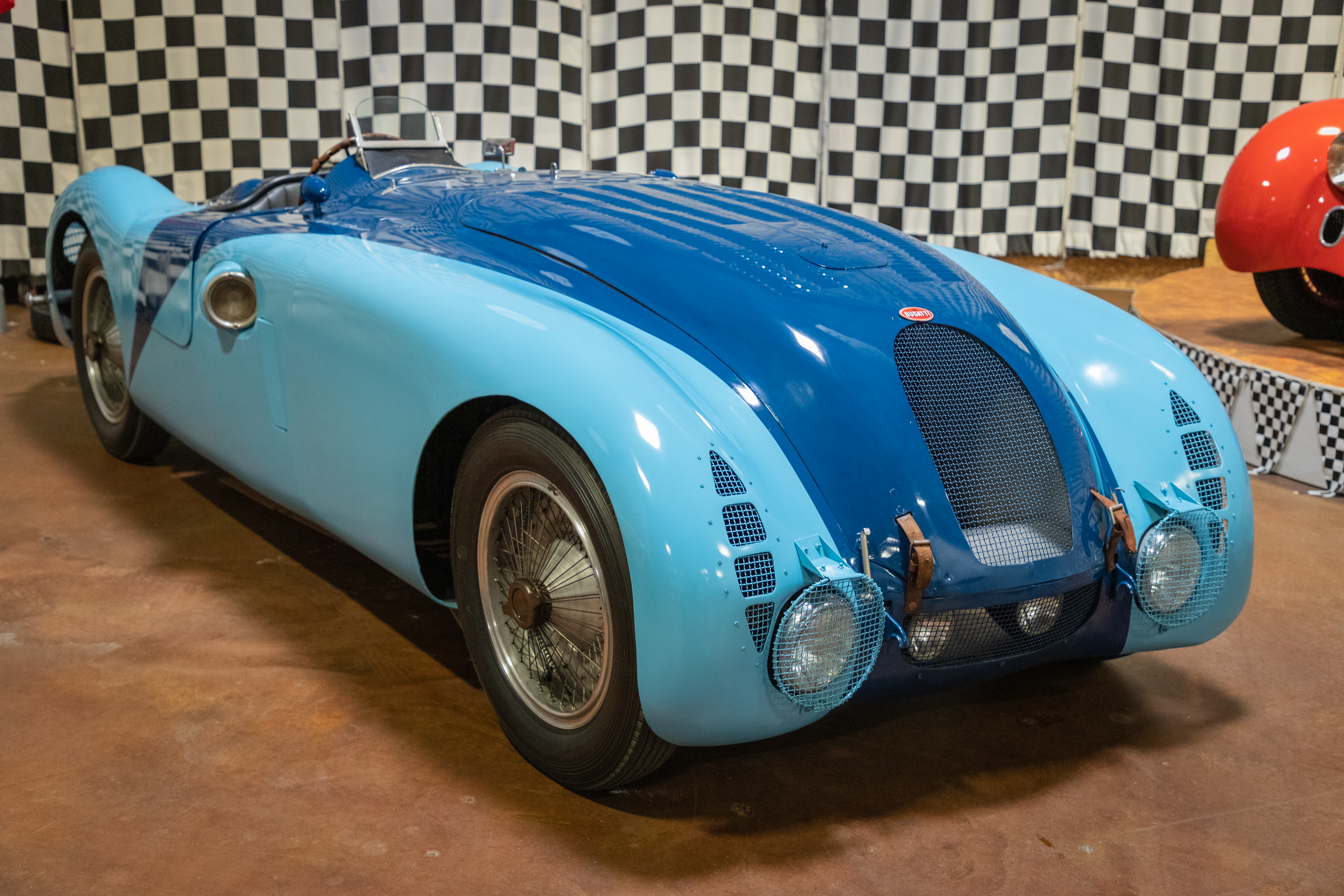
Type 57G Tank

The famous, 57S-based, 57G Tank won the 1936 French Grand Prix, as well as the 1937 24 Hours of Le Mans. Three 57G Tanks were produced. Chassis number 57335, the Le Mans winner, is the only one known to exist and is currently on display at the Simeone Foundation Automotive Museum in Philadelphia, US.
