= David Grainger (presenter) =

Car restorer and television host

David Charles Grainger
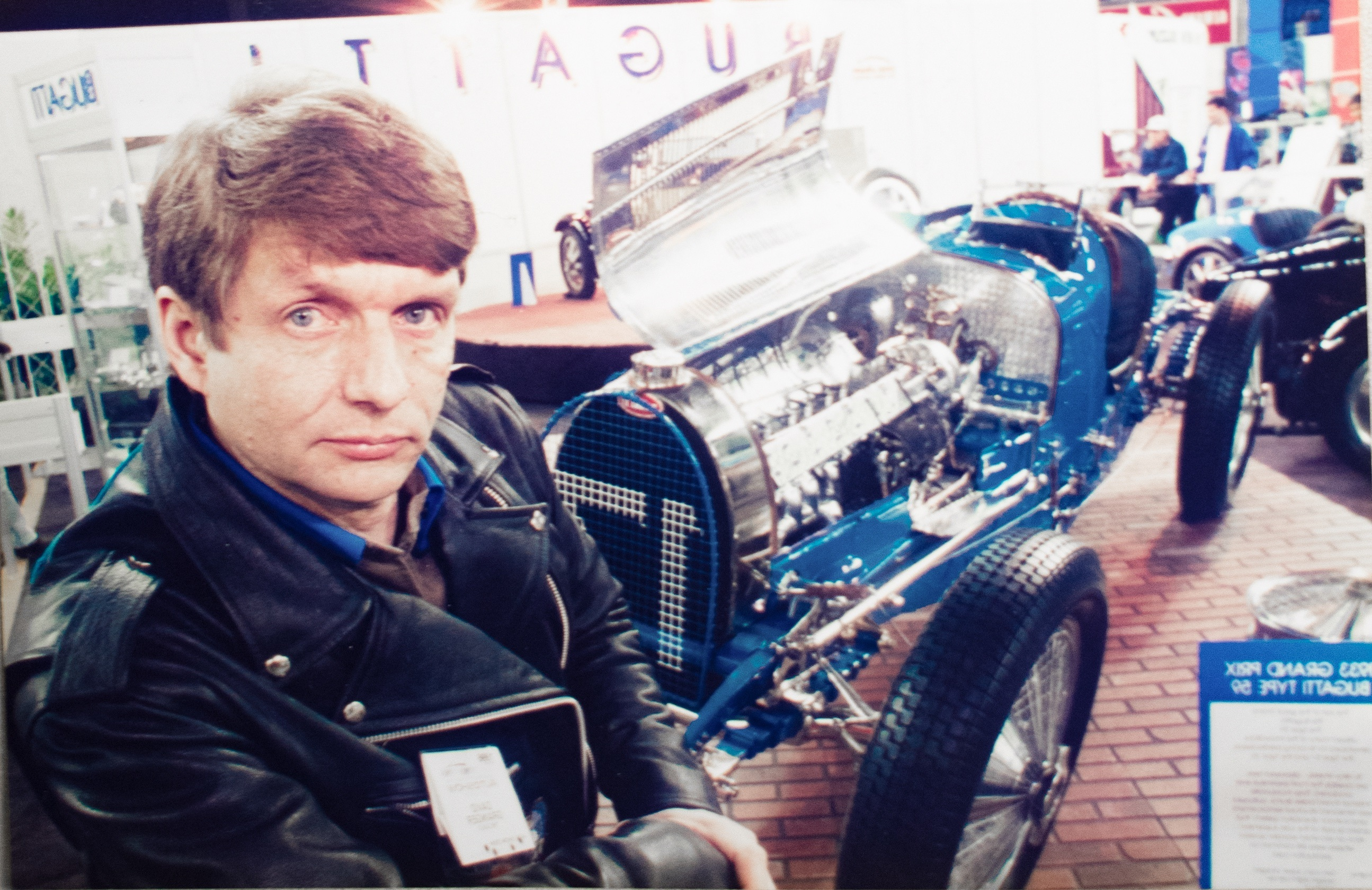
- Occupations: Car restorer, television host, writer
- Years active: 1985–present
- Television: Restoration Garage
- Spouse: Janice Stone

David Charles Grainger is the president and co-founder of The Guild of Automotive Restorers, a company that specializes in restoring classic and antique cars. He hosts a television series called Restoration Garage (a.k.a. Guild Garage), which is seen around the world on various channels, specifically Motor Trend and Velocity in the US and Canada. Grainger has been a columnist with the National Post and The Globe and Mail. Grainger has regularly contributed to other Canadian, British and American publications.

== Early life ==
Grainger started writing in the 1970s where his columns dealt with wildlife and the environment. He also wrote for papers in the Kitchener and Waterloo area, including the Kitchener Waterloo Record. Moreover Grainger also worked for zoos and wildlife sanctuaries and founded and operated his own sanctuary specializing in injured birds. Grainger also illustrated wildlife for numerous magazines and other publications and worked with Ian Ballantine of Ballantine books on a special project in the early 1980s. During this time and leading into the early 1990s Grainger turned to work in the film and television industry where he specialized in special effects and gradually made his way into scriptwriting and producing. Grainger went on to build the Guild Of Automotive Restorers in the mid-1990s, which is a company that builds and restores everything ranging from brass era cars from the early 1900s to custom designed Hot Rods or re-bodied Ferraris.

== Career ==
Grainger restores and recreates both high end and unique classic cars. He designs on average one a year for clients internationally. He restored the Alfa-Romeo that appeared in the 1946 Paris Salon and established Battista (Pinin) Farina as a major designer and helped establish the Pinin Farina design house. Grainger and the Alfa 6c 2500 Speciale were guests of the Pinin Farina 85th anniversary celebrations held in Turin, Italy.

Grainger completed a 26-part television show in which he restored on camera the George Barris Supervan. That show ran repeatedly for over two years on the Speed Channel.

The Bugatti Aerolithe was a career landmark for David with the car winning numerous awards internationally. The original Aerolithe was built in Alsace, France but was lost until The Guild of Automotive Restorers took on the task of building the Aerolithe from only a handful of original Bugatti parts. The Aerolithe started with the oldest known Type 57 Bugatti chassis in existence, serial number 57104 and over the course of a few years after a nearly insurmountable amount of work the project was completed. The Aerolithe is on display at The Guild of Automotive Restores located in Bradford, Ontario, Canada.
