= List of fastback automobiles =

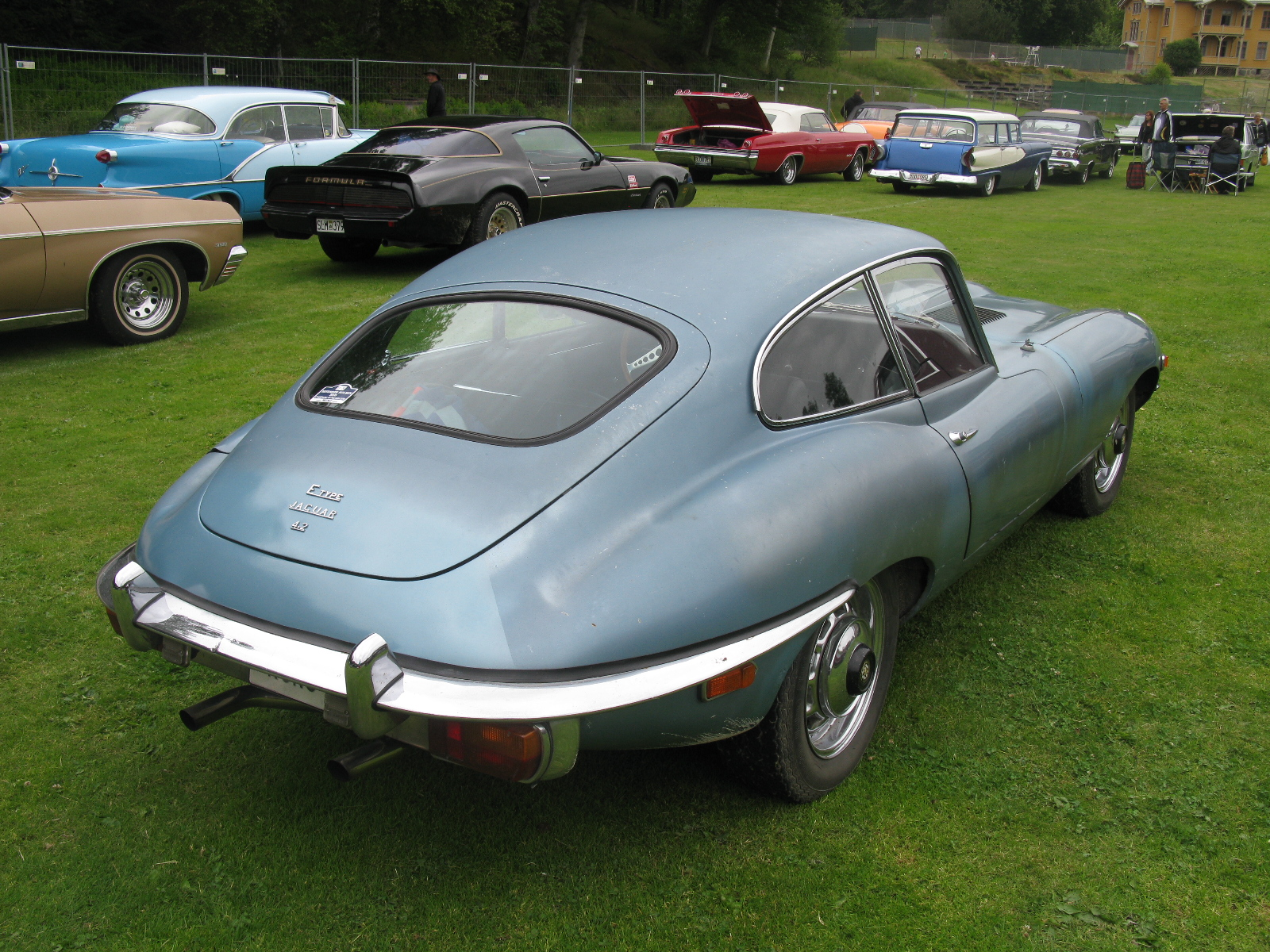
1961–1975 Jaguar E-Type coupe

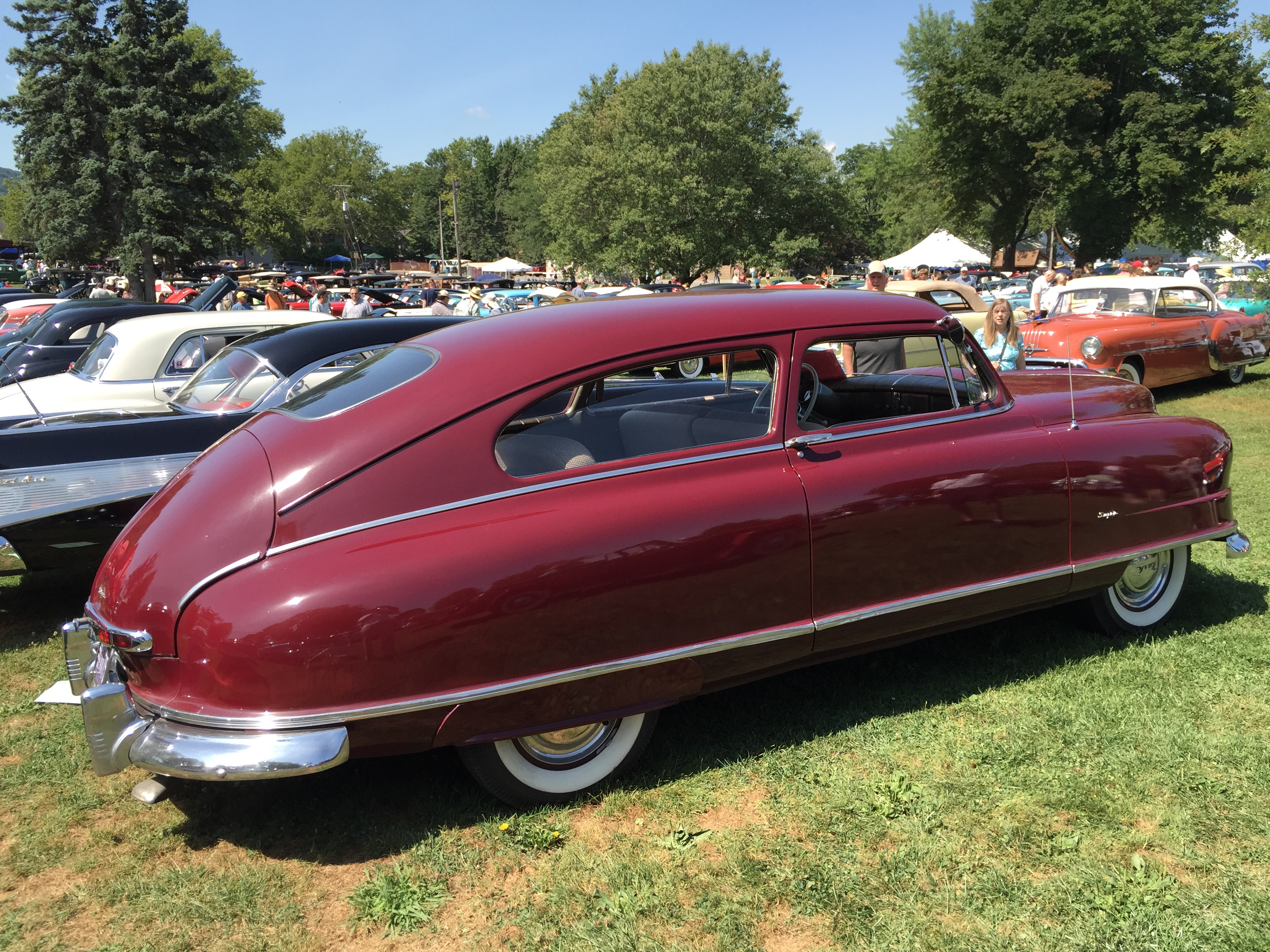
1949 Nash Ambassador Airflyte

This list of fastback automobiles includes examples of a car body style whose roofline slopes continuously down at the back. It is a form of back for an automobile body consisting of a single convex curve from the top to the rear bumper. This automotive design element "relates to an interest in streamlining and aerodynamics".

== Two-door fastbacks ==
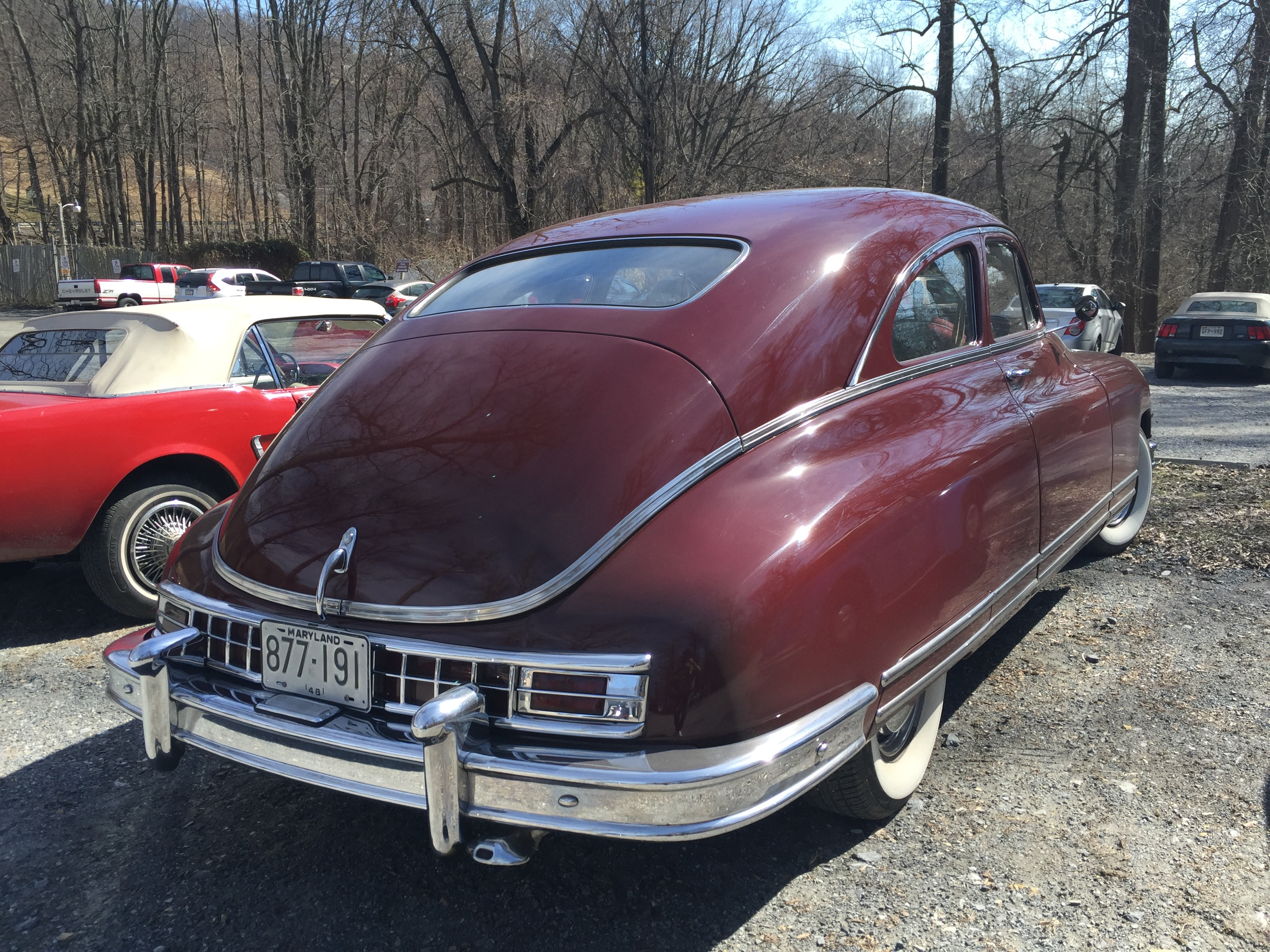
1948 Packard Custom Eight

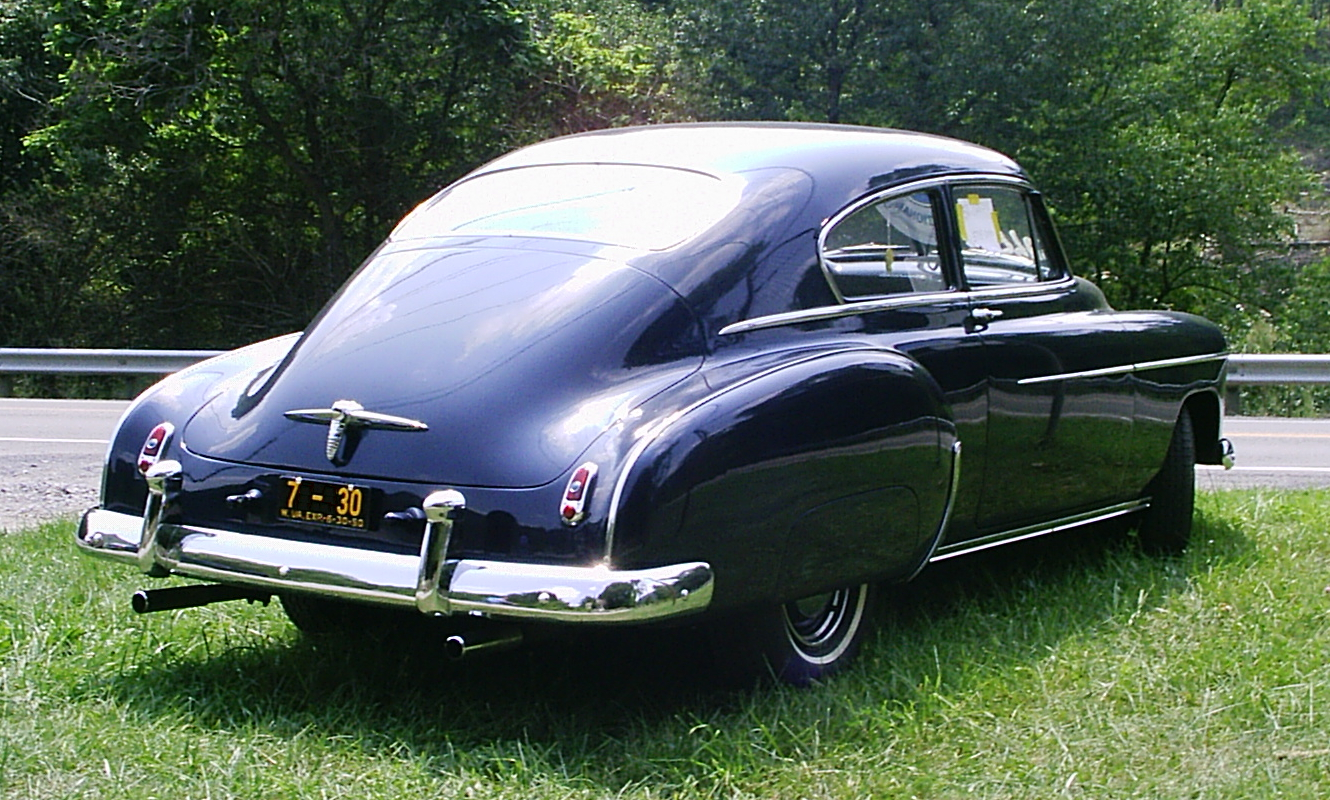
1950 Chevrolet Fleetline, one of several GM fastback models

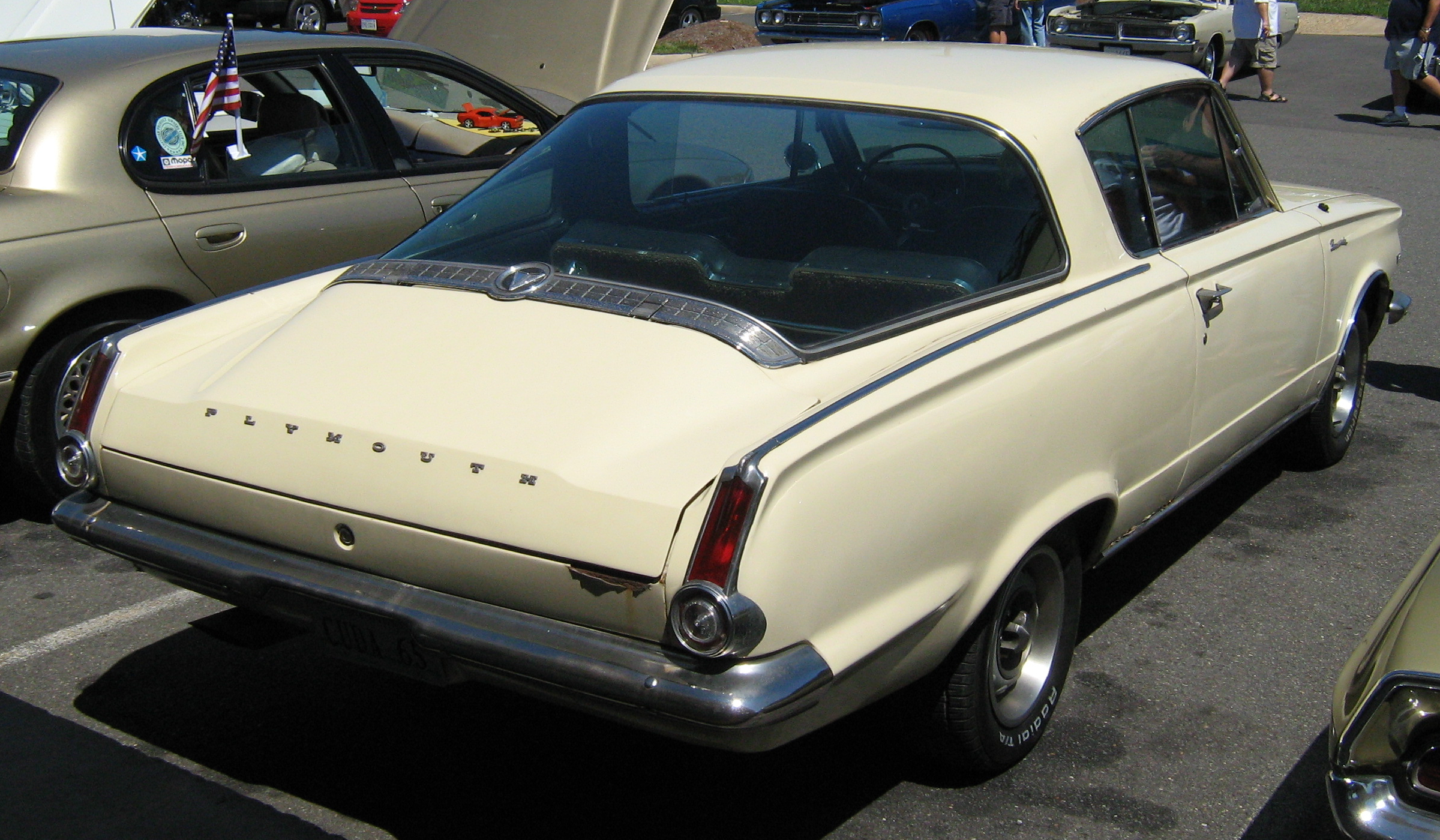
1964 Plymouth Barracuda

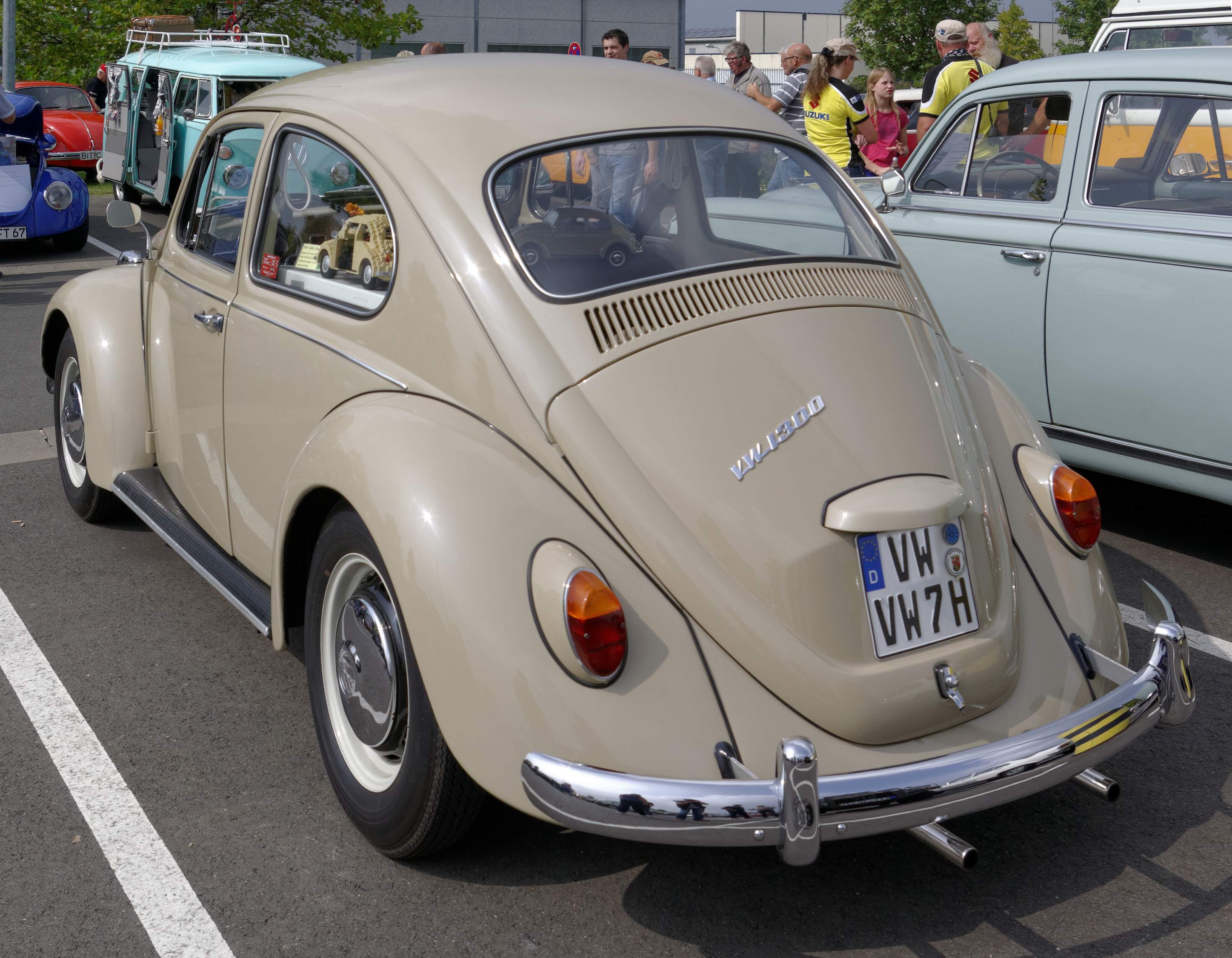
Subcompact fastback: 1967 Volkswagen Beetle (Type 1)

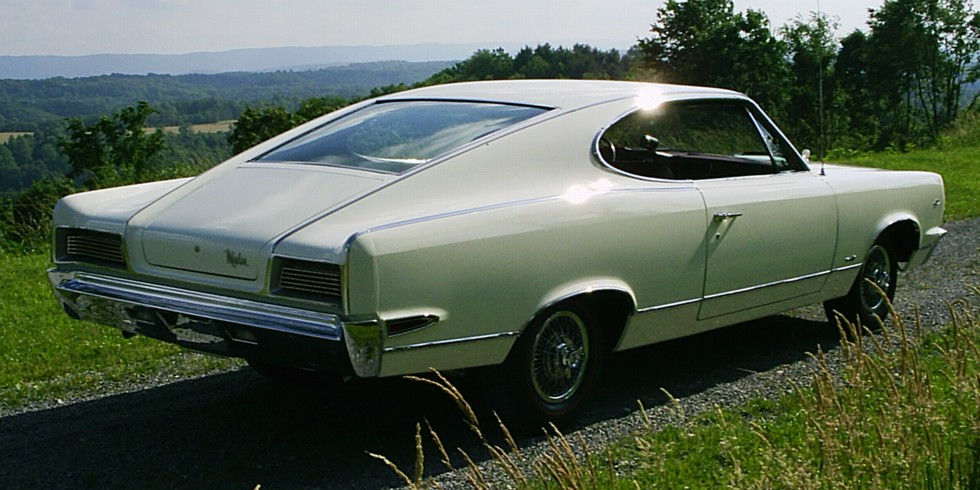
Hardtop fastback: 1967 AMC Marlin

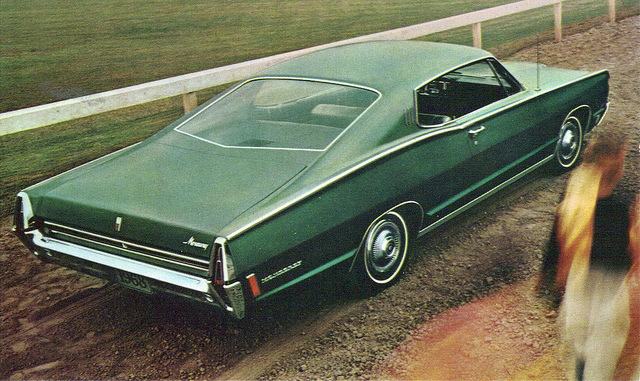
Full-size fastback: 1968 Mercury Monterey

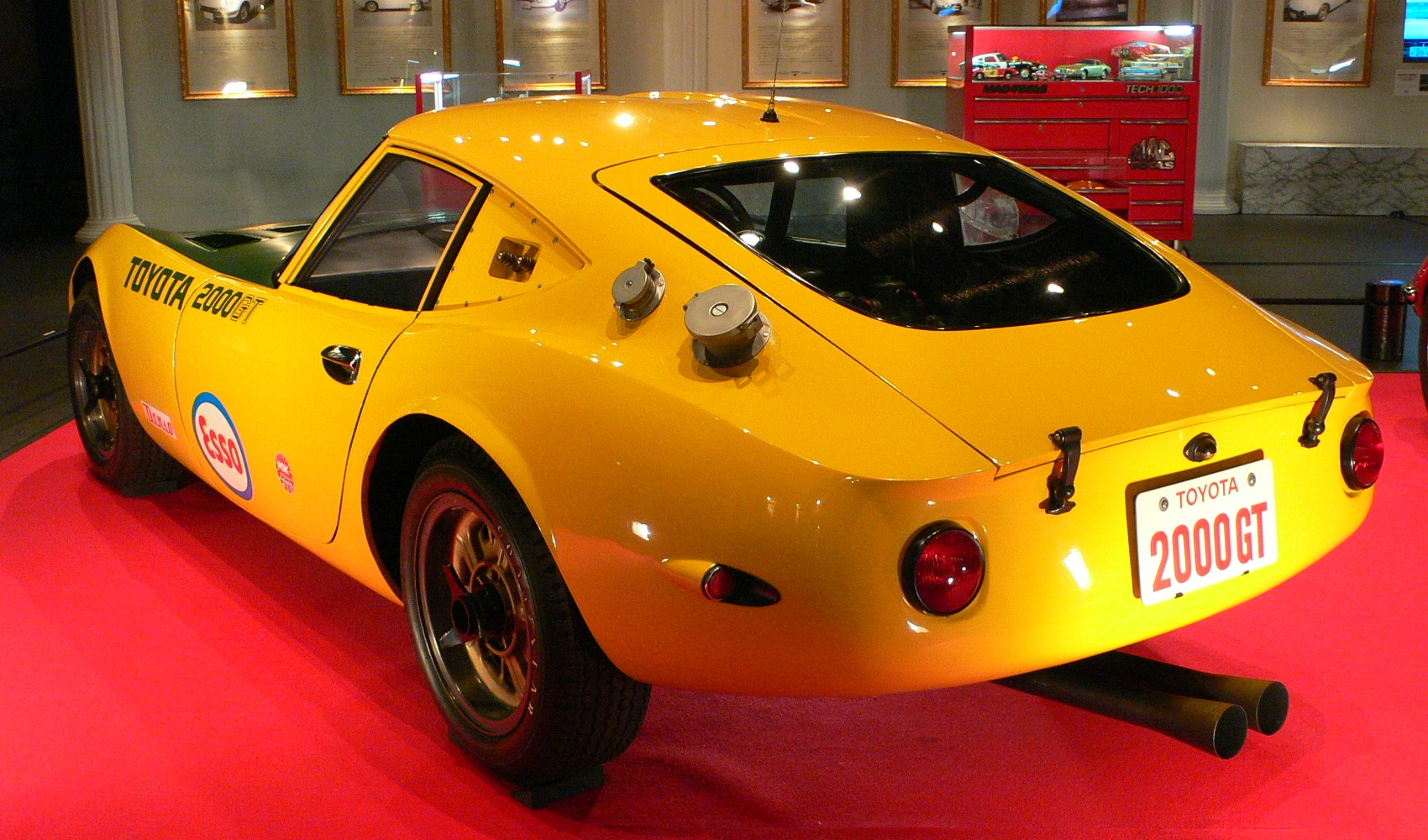
GT fastback: 1966 Toyota 2000GT racing car

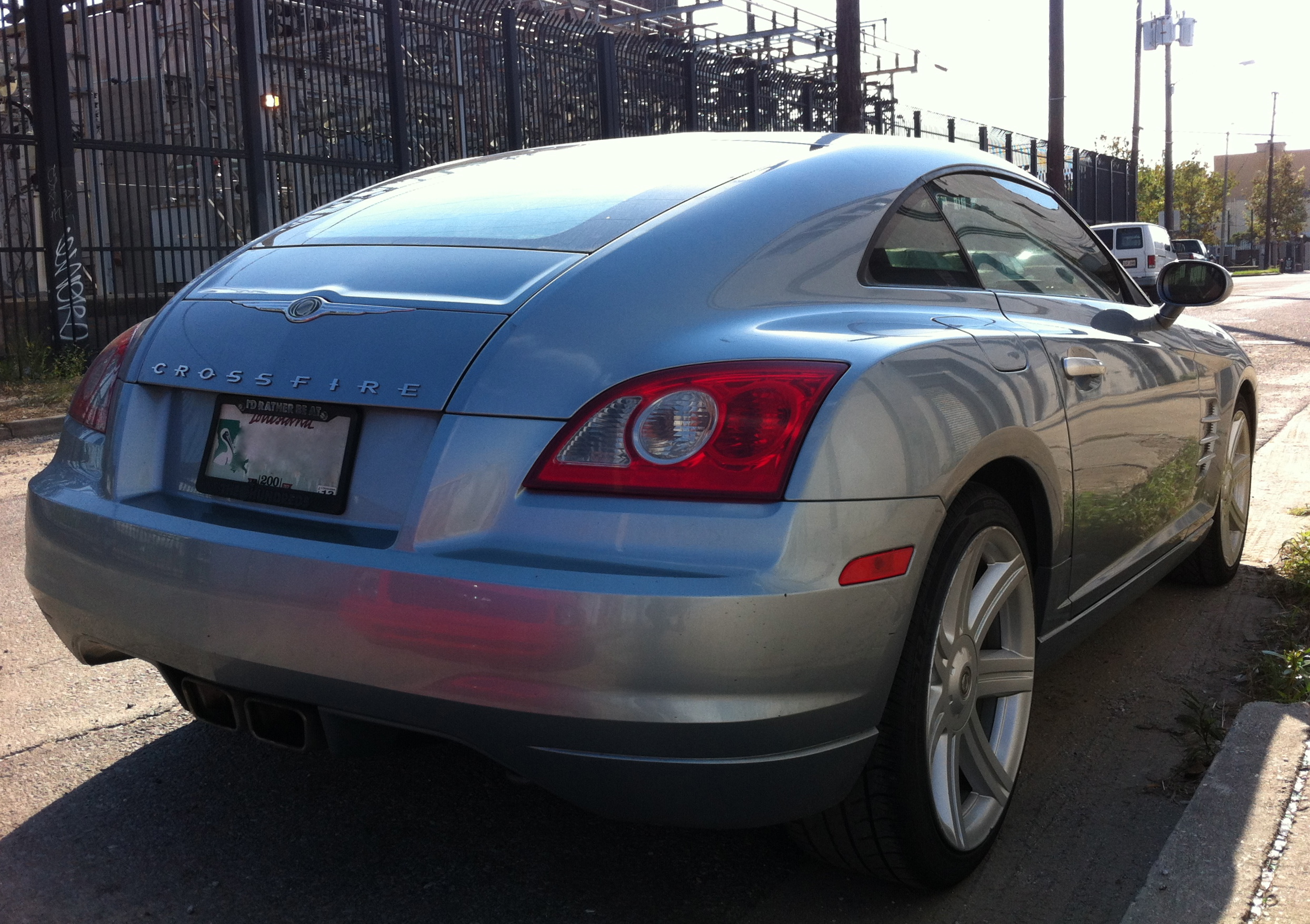
Two-seat sports car fastback: Chrysler Crossfire

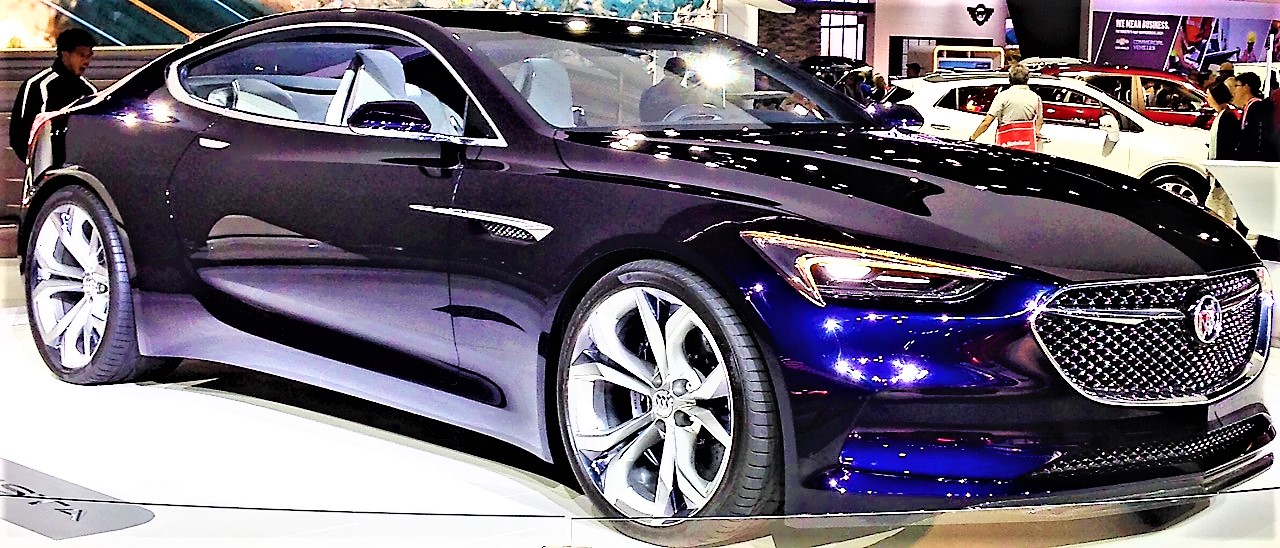
Futuristic fastback: 2016 Buick Avista concept

- 1931–1936 Stout Scarab
- 1933 Packard 1106 Twelve Aero Sport Coupe
- 1934–1937 Pierce-Arrow
- 1934–1937 Chrysler Airflow
- 1936–1937 Bugatti Type 57SC Atlantic
- 1938–1952 Plymouth sedans
- 1938–2003 Volkswagen Type 1 (Beetle)
- 1941–1948 Pontiac Torpedo Custom
- 1941–1949 Cadillac Series 61 and Series 62 Club Coupe Sedanette
- 1941–1952 Pontiac Streamliner
- 1941 Buick Special Sedanette 46S
- 1941–1942 Nash 600
- 1941–1952 Chevrolet Fleetline
- 1942–1950 Buick Super Sedanette
- 1946–1948 Chevrolet Fleetmaster
- 1946–1942 Packard sedans
- 1947–1950 Maserati A6 1500
- 1947–1956 Maserati A6G/54
- 1947–1966 Volvo PV444 and Volvo PV544
- 1948–1965 Porsche 356
- 1948–1952 Hudson Commodore
- 1948–1955 Bristol 401, 402, and 403
- 1949 Tatra T601 Monte Carlo (Finned Fastback)
- 1949–1951 Nash Ambassador Airflyte
- 1949–1960 Saab 92 and Saab 93
- 1949–1950 Oldsmobile 88 Club Sedan
- 1952–1955 Bentley Continental R-Type
- 1960–1980 Saab 96
- 1961–1975 Jaguar E-type
- 1963–1967 Chevrolet Corvette (C2) ("Boattail" fastback)
- 1963–present Porsche 911
- 1963–1965 Aston Martin DB5
- 1963–1970 Maserati Mistral
- 1963–1976 Lancia Fulvia Sport
- 1964–1969 Plymouth Barracuda
- 1965–1967 AMC Marlin
- 1965–1966 Honda S600
- 1965–1978, 2005–Present Ford Mustang
- 1966–1967 Dodge Charger
- 1966–1973 Volkswagen Type 3 Fastback (dates are from U.S. lineup)
- 1966–1971 Jensen FF
- 1966–1970 Oldsmobile Toronado
- 1966–1976 Jensen Interceptor
- 1966–1973 Triumph GT6
- 1967–1973 Isuzu Bellett
- 1967–1970 Toyota 2000GT
- 1967–1968 Mercury Monterey and Ford Galaxie
- 1967-1968 Chevrolet Impala
- 1967–1970 Opel Olympia
- 1967–1971 Opel Commodore A
- 1967–1972 Aston Martin DBS
- 1967–1973 Maserati Ghibli
- 1967–1976 Sunbeam Rapier Fastback
- 1967–1979 Holden Torana and Holden Sunbird
- 1968–1973 Ferrari Daytona
- 1968–1973 Ford Fairlane Torino/Torino SportsRoof
- 1968–1978 Lamborghini Espada
- 1968–1969 Mercury Cyclone
- 1968–1973 Opel GT
- 1968–1974 Volkswagen Type 4
- 1968–1981 Isuzu 117 Coupé
- 1969–1986 Ford Capri
- 1969–1975 Maserati Indy
- 1969–1975 Sunbeam Alpine "Fastback"
- 1969–1976 Audi 100 Coupé S
- 1969–1978 Nissan S30
- 1969–1989 Aston Martin V8
- 1970–1977 Alfa Romeo Montreal
- 1970–1992 Chevrolet Camaro
- 1970–1975 Citroën SM
- 1970–1977 Ford Maverick and Mercury Comet
- 1970–1975 Mitsubishi Galant GTO
- 1970–1981 Pontiac Firebird
- 1970–1976 Volkswagen TL (Brazil)
- 1970–1975 Volkswagen Karmann-Ghia TC (Brazil)
- 1971–1977 Chevrolet Vega
- 1971–1980 Ford Pinto
- 1971–1973 Buick Riviera (Bottail Fastback)
- 1971–1988 Chevrolet Opala (Brazil)
- 1972–1973 Aston Martin Vantage
- 1972–1977 Ford Granada
- 1972–1987 Alfa Romeo Alfetta GT and Alfa Romeo Alfetta GTV
- 1973–1975 Leyland P76 Coupe
- 1973–1981 Volkswagen Passat (B1)
- 1973–1976 Volkswagen SP2
- 1974–1978 AMC Matador
- 1974–1982 Maserati Khamsin
- 1975–1980 Buick Skyhawk
- 1975–1986 Holden Gemini
- 1975–1980 Chevrolet Monza 2+2 and Monza Spyder
- 1975–1988 Nissan Silvia
- 1975–1980 Oldsmobile Starfire
- 1975–1982 Lotus Éclat
- 1975–1977 Pontiac Astre
- 1976–1977 Mercury Capri II
- 1976–1980 Pontiac Sunbird
- 1977–1989 Aston Martin V8 Vantage
- 1978–1982, 1984–Present Chevrolet Corvette
- 1978–1980 Buick Century
- 1978–1980 Oldsmobile Cutlass Salon
- 1978–1986 Opel Monza
- 1979–1987 Mercury Capri
- 1979–1983 Nissan S130
- 1979–2002 Toyota Supra
- 1980–1991 Audi Quattro
- 1981–1987 Audi Coupé GT
- 1981–1988 Volkswagen Passat (B2)
- 1982–1992 Pontiac Firebird
- 1983–1987 Dodge Charger, Plymouth Duster and Plymouth Turismo
- 1983–1991 Honda Ballade CR-X
- 1986–1988 Pontiac Fiero GT
- 1989–1999 Nissan Silvia/180SX/240SX/200SX
- 1978–1995 Porsche 928
- 1992–2002 Mazda Rx-7 FD
- 1993–1998 Ruf BTR2
- 1994–2004 Aston Martin DB7
- 1996–present Porsche Cayman
- 1998 Bugatti EB 118
- 1998–present Ruf Turbo R
- 1999 Alfa Romeo 166 Bertone Bella
- 1999–2006 Honda Insight
- 2000–present Ruf RGT
- 2001–2007, 2012–2018, 2024–present Aston Martin Vanquish
- 2003 Ford Visos
- 2003 Al Araba 1
- 2003–2005 Smart Roadster Coupe
- 2004–2008 Chrysler Crossfire
- 2004–present Bentley Continental GT
- 2004–2016 Aston Martin DB9
- 2005–2018 Aston Martin Vantage
- 2005–2008 BMW Z4 Coupé
- 2006–2009 Pontiac Solstice Coupe
- 2007–2012 Aston Martin DBS
- 2009–2012 Aston Martin One-77
- 2009–2016 Hyundai Genesis Coupe
- 2010–2013 Dodge Viper
- 2011 Jaguar C-X16
- 2011–2012 Lexus LFA
- 2011–2012 Aston Martin Virage
- 2011–2017 Ferrari F12berlinetta
- 2012 AC 378 GT Zagato
- 2012–2021 Toyota 86, Scion FR-S and Subaru BRZ
- 2013–2022 Rolls-Royce Wraith
- 2013–present Equus Bass 770
- 2014 Maserati Alfieri
- 2014–2015 Aston Martin DB10
- 2014–2024 Jaguar F-Type Coupé
- 2014–present Mercedes-AMG GT
- 2014–2020 BMW i8
- 2015 Bugatti Atlantic concept
- 2015–2016 Aston Martin Vulcan
- 2016 Buick Avista (concept car)
- 2016–Present Mazda MX-5 RF (ND)
- 2016–2023 Aston Martin DB11
- 2016–2021 Honda Civic Coupe
- 2017–present Ruf CTR Anniversary
- 2017–2024 Ferrari 812 Superfast
- 2018–2024 Aston Martin DBS
- 2018–present Aston Martin Vantage
- 2019–present Toyota GR Supra
- 2020–present Ferrari Roma
- 2021–present Toyota GR86 and Subaru BRZ
- 2022–present Nissan Z (RZ34)
- 2023–present Rolls-Royce Spectre

== Four-door fastbacks ==
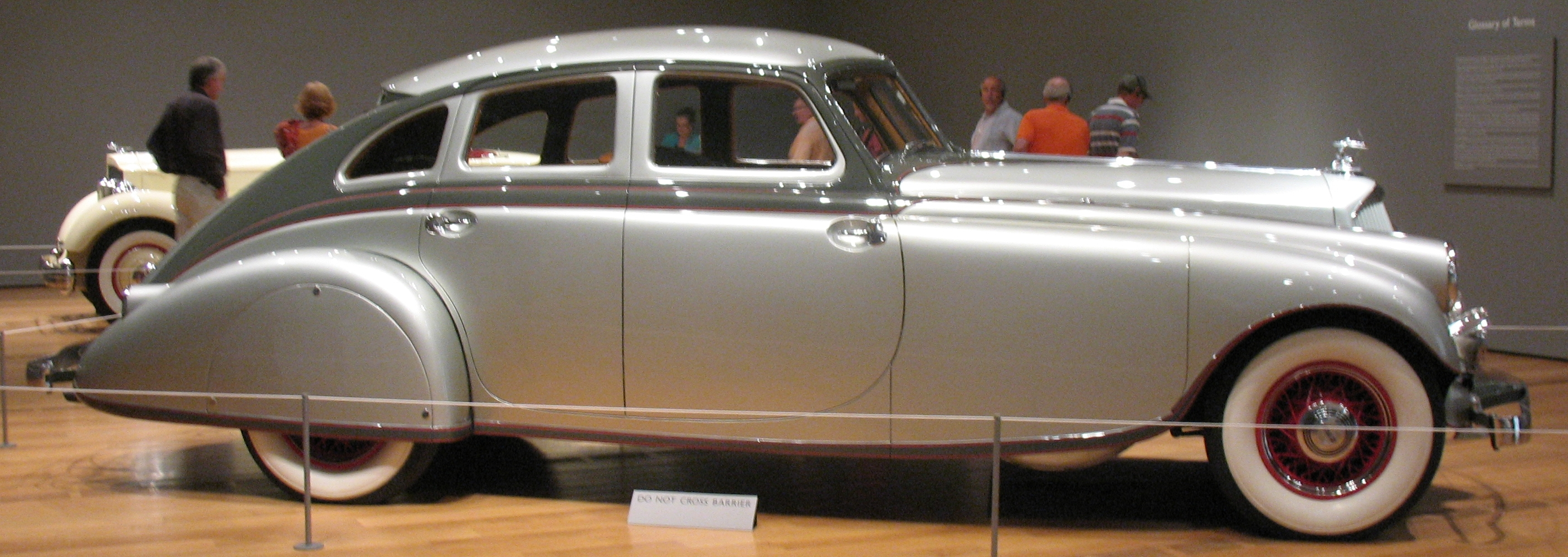
1933 Pierce-Arrow Silver Arrow

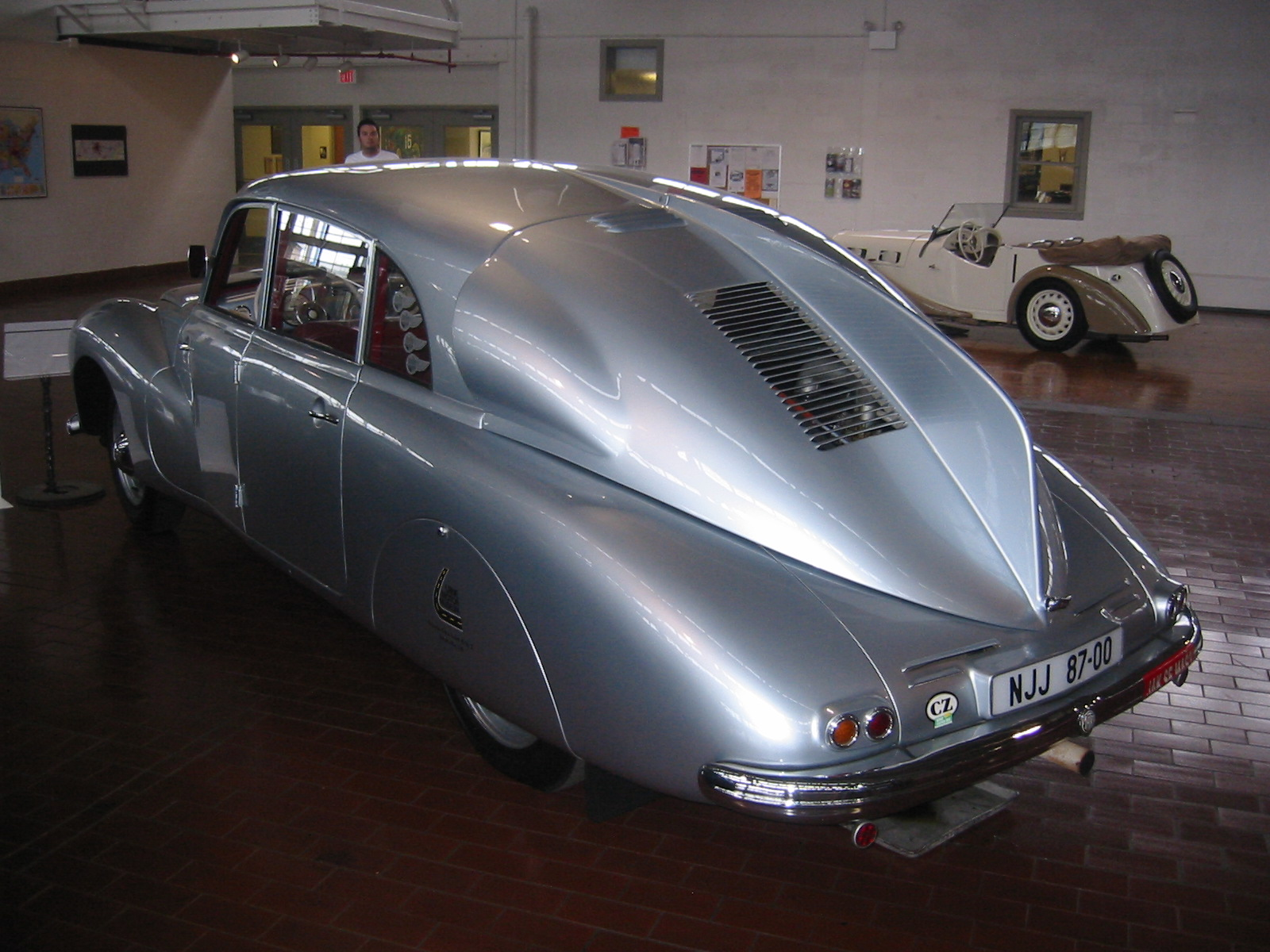
Fastback 1937–1950 Tatra T87, fitted with a vertical stabilizer

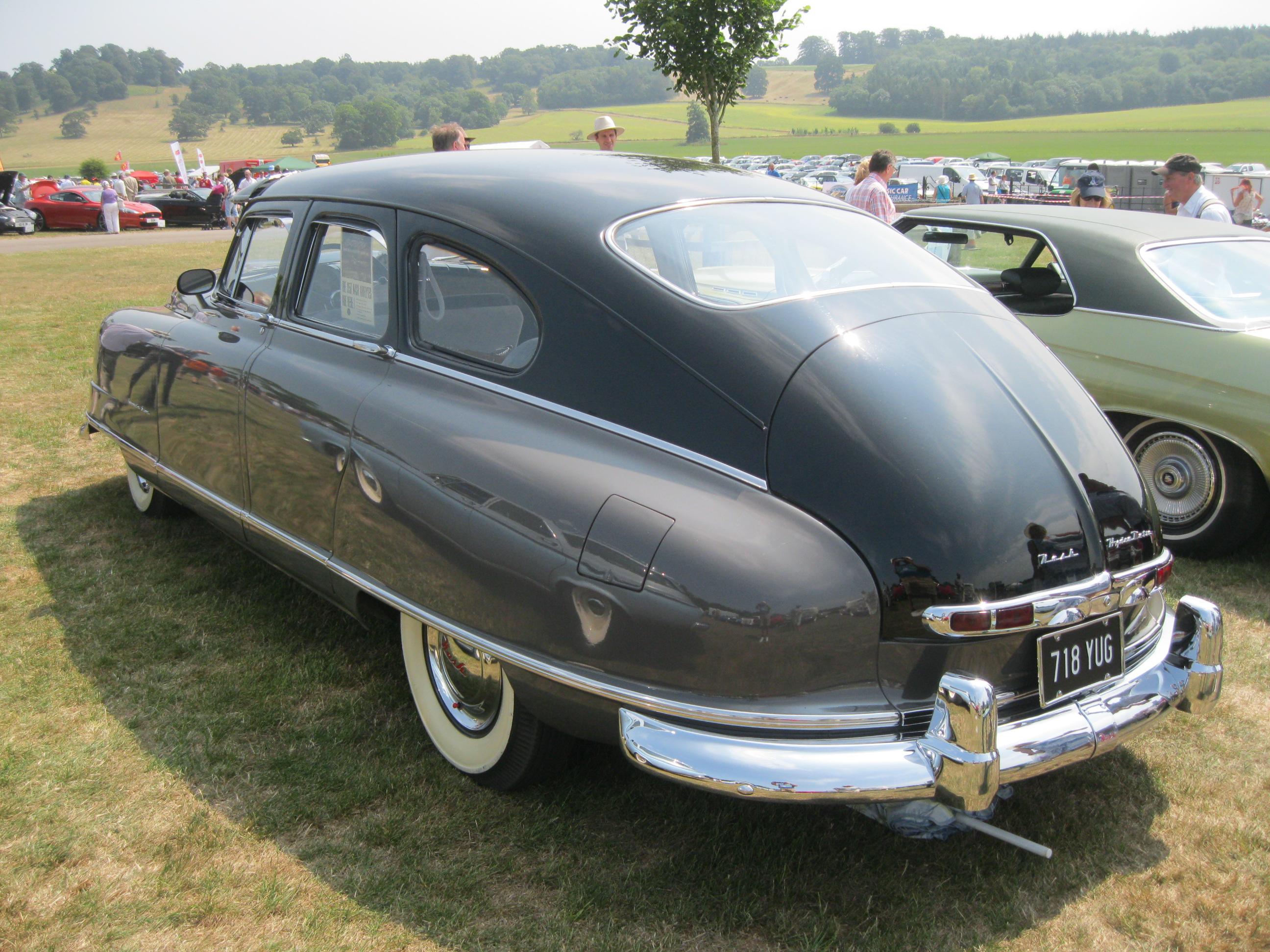
1950 Nash Ambassador Airflyte

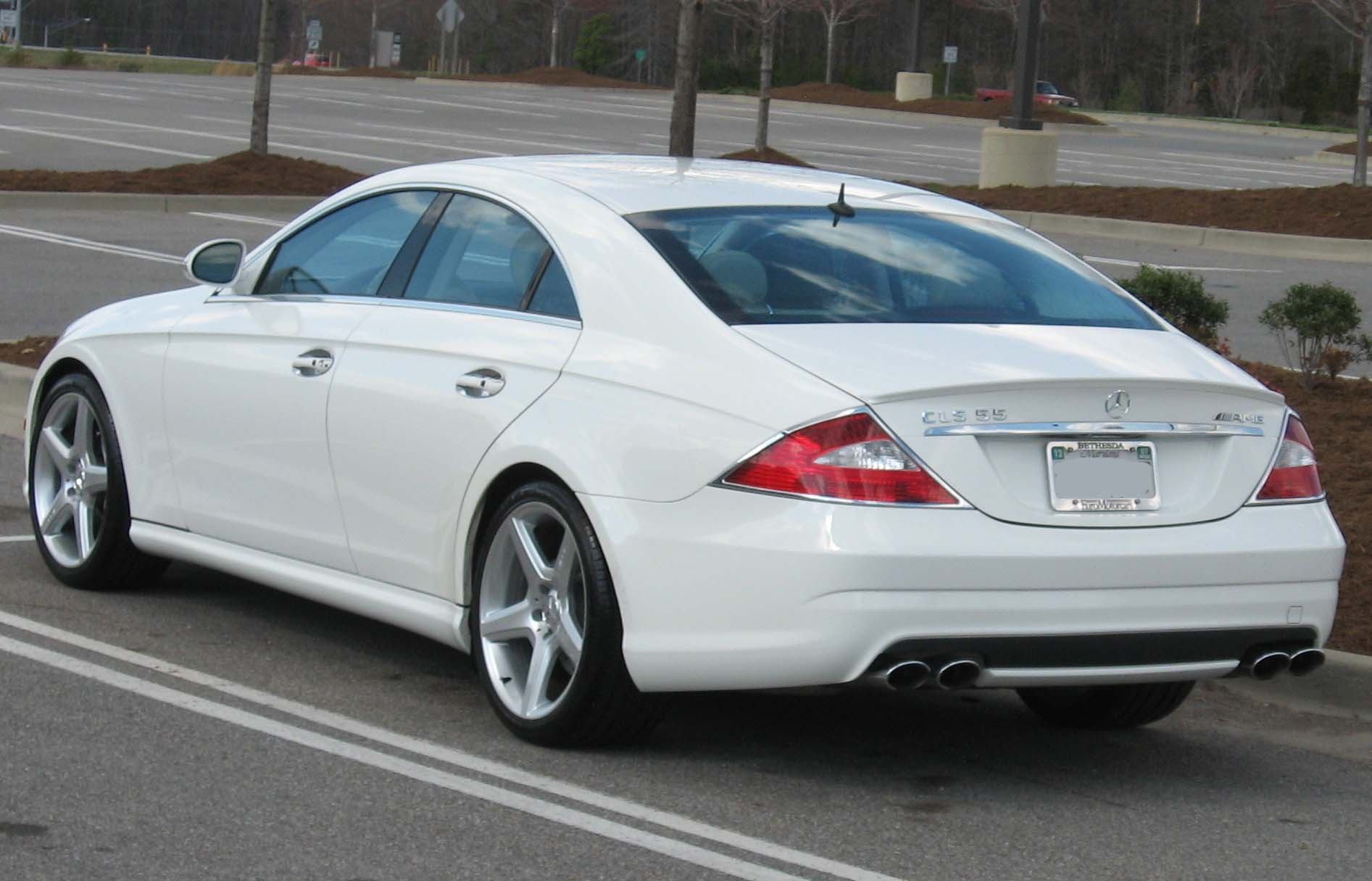
Modern fastback: 2006 Mercedes-Benz CLS55 AMG

- 1933–1935 Pierce-Arrow Silver Arrow
- 1933–1936 Riley Nine (Kestrel)
- 1933–1951 Pontiac Streamliner
- 1934–1938 Tatra T77/T77A (Finned Fastback)
- 1936–1939 Tatra T97 (Finned Fastback)
- 1936–1943 Toyota AA
- 1937–1950 Tatra T87 (Finned Fastback)
- 1938–1952 Plymouth sedans
- 1940–1948 Pontiac Torpedo
- 1946–1948 Chevrolet Fleetmaster
- 1946–1952 Tatra T600 Tatraplan (Finned Fastback)
- 1946–1958 GAZ-M20 Pobeda
- 1947–1953 Jowett Javelin
- 1947–1953 Standard Vanguard
- 1948 Tucker 48
- 1949 Lincoln Cosmopolitan Town Sedan
- 1949–1951 Nash Ambassador Airflyte
- 1950–1953 Tatra T87-603
- 1951–1957 FSO Warszawa (Polish M20 clone)
- 1952–1959 Borgward Hansa 2400
- 1965–1973 Opel Kadett B
- 1967–1970 Opel Olympia
- 1968–1974 Volkswagen Type 4
- 1969–1978 Citroën Ami 8
- 1970–1979 Citroën GS
- 1971–1976 Volkswagen TL
- 1972–1982 Lancia Beta Berlina
- 1973–1982 Austin Allegro
- 1973–1977 Nissan Violet
- 1973–1981 Volkswagen Passat (B1)
- 1974 Maserati Medici I
- 1974–1991 Citroën CX
- 1975–1981 Princess
- 1975–1984 Lancia Gamma Berlina
- 1975–1982 Hyundai Pony
- 1976 Maserati Medici II
- 1976–1986 Rover SD1
- 1978–1979 Buick Century
- 1978–1979 Oldsmobile Cutlass Salon and Cutlass Salon Brougham
- 1978–1982 Nissan Pulsar
- 1981–1988 Opel Ascona C
- 1981–1988 Volkswagen Passat (B2)
- 1982–1984 Austin Ambassador
- 1982–1994 Citroën BX
- 1986–1995 Yue Loong Feeling
- 1986–1999 Rover 800 series
- 1993 Bugatti EB 112
- 1999 Bugatti EB 218
- 1999 Volkswagen Concept D
- 2000–2006 Hyundai Elantra 5-Door GT
- 2003 Chevrolet SS concept
- 2003–Present Toyota Prius
- 2003 Subaru B11S
- 2003 Opel Insignia Concept
- 2004 Alfa Romeo Visconti
- 2004–2023 Mercedes-Benz CLS-Class
- 2006–2012 Citroën C6
- 2007 Lincoln MKR
- 2007 BMW CS Concept
- 2008–2017 Volkswagen Passat CC
- 2009 Bugatti 16C Galibier
- 2009 Audi Sportback concept
