= Fastback =

Type of styling to rear car bodywork

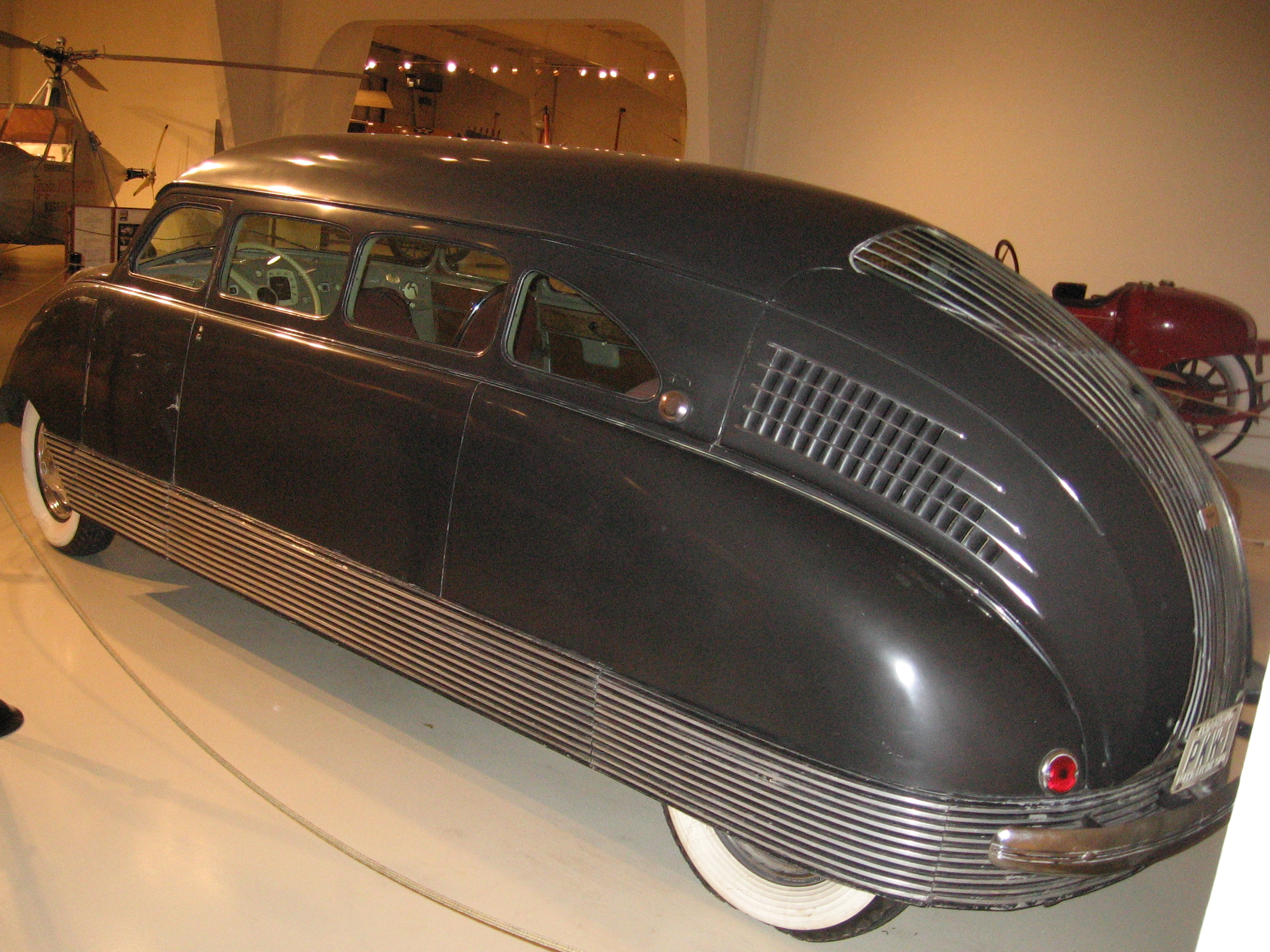
1935 Stout Scarab

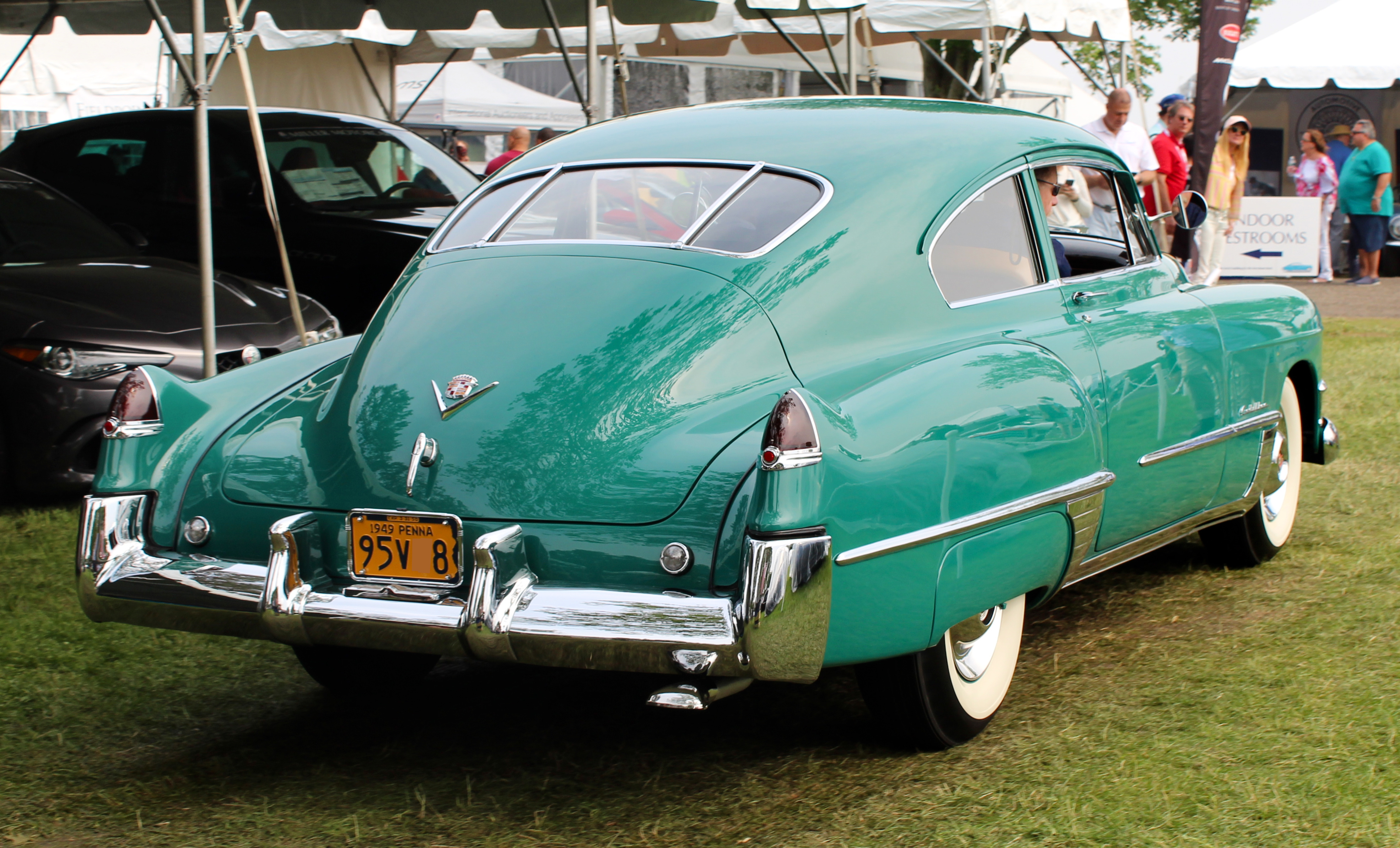
1949 Cadillac Series 62 rear

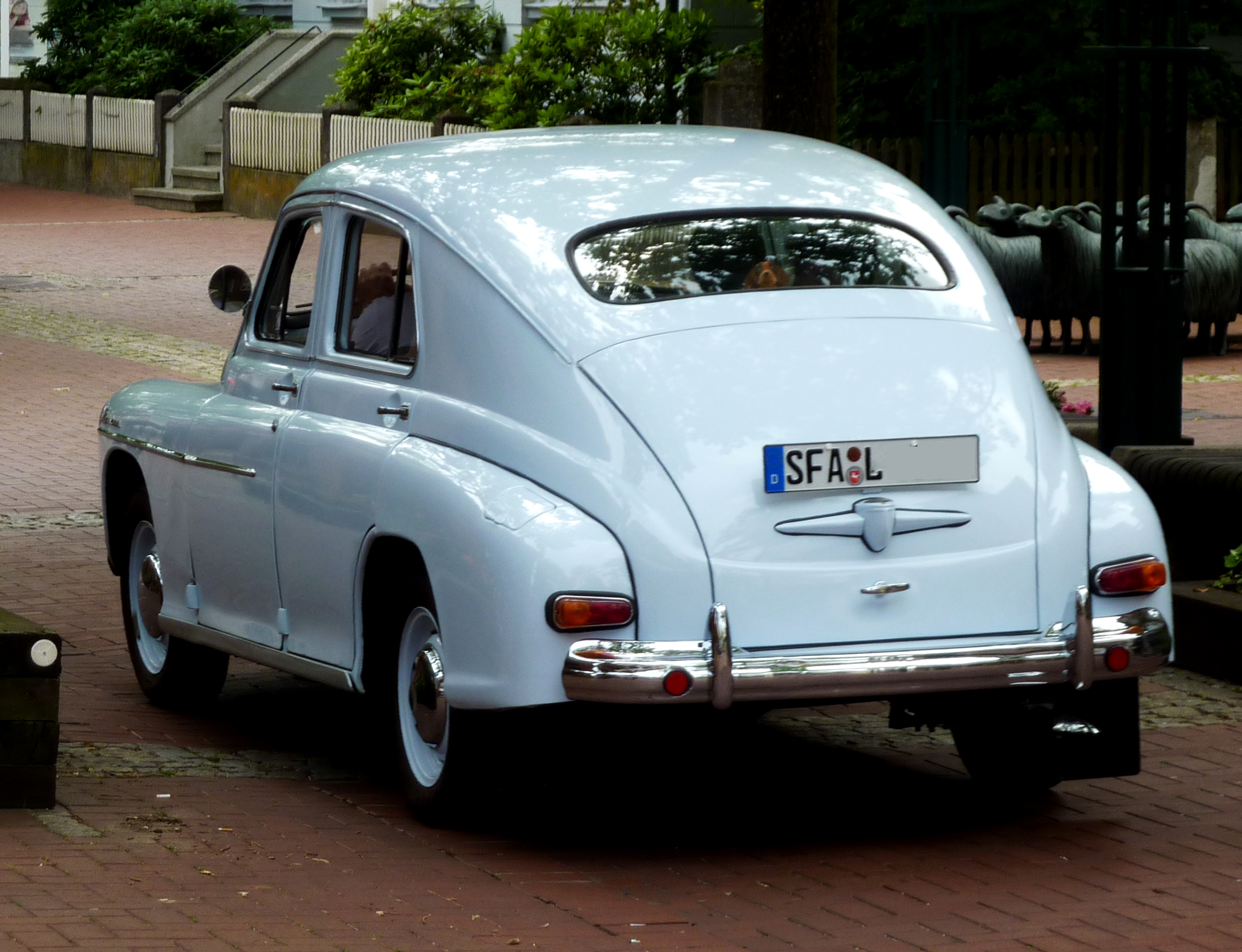
1950s Warszawa M20

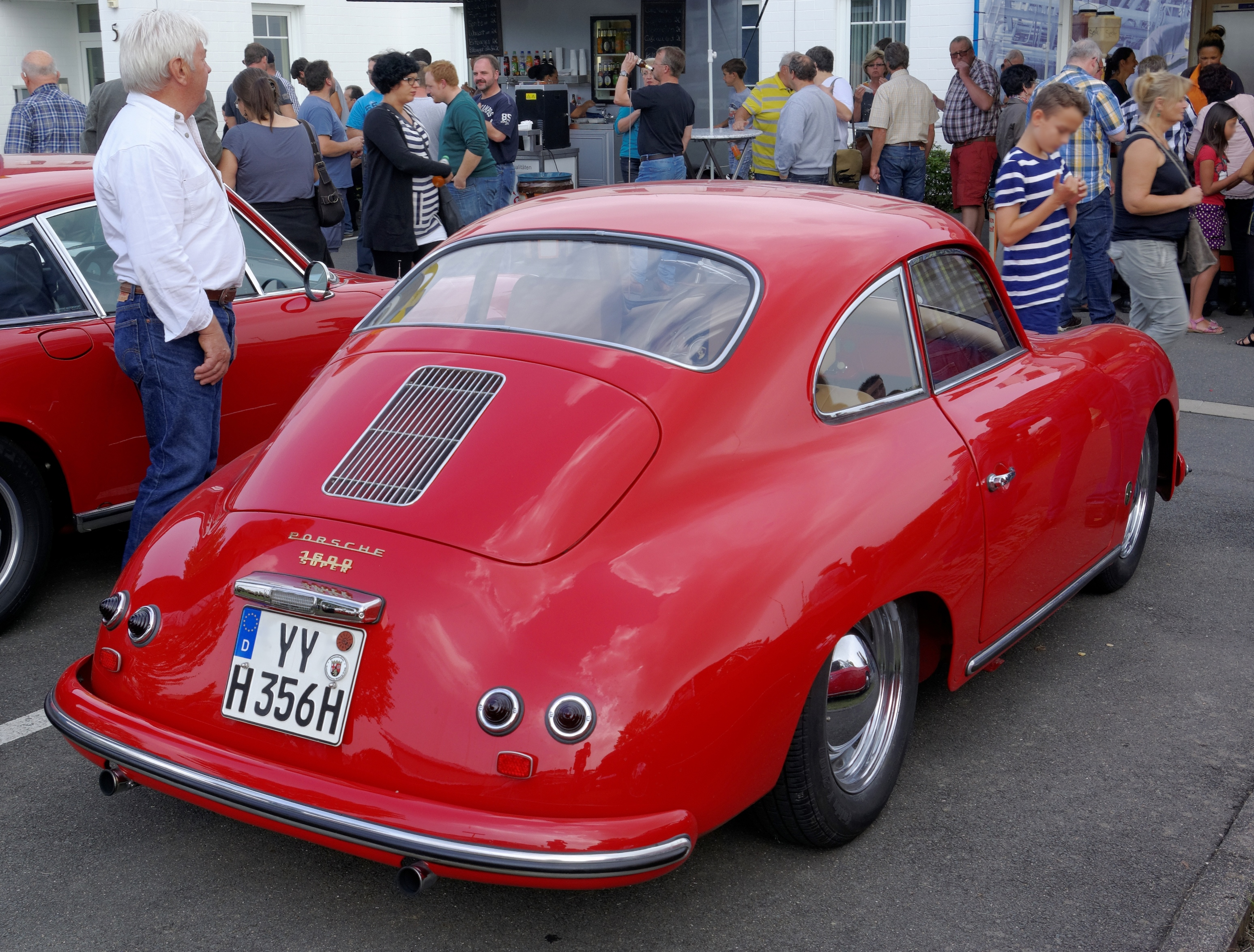
1956 Porsche 356A

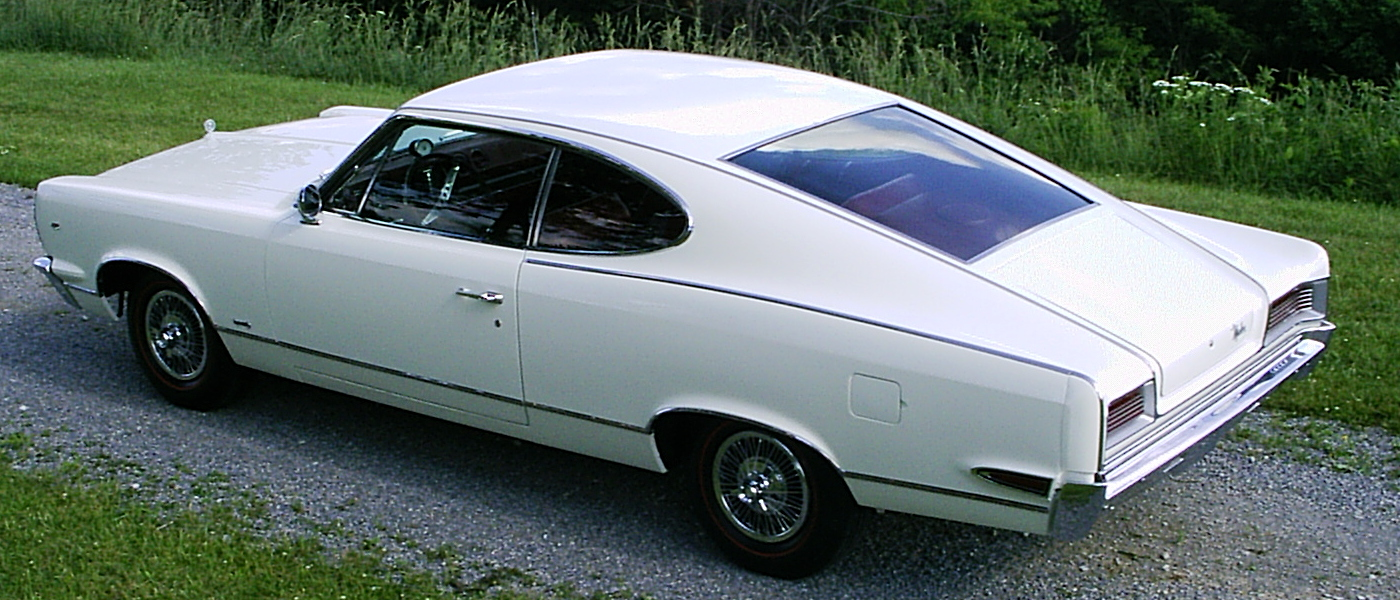
1967 AMC Marlin, a full-size 2-door fastback

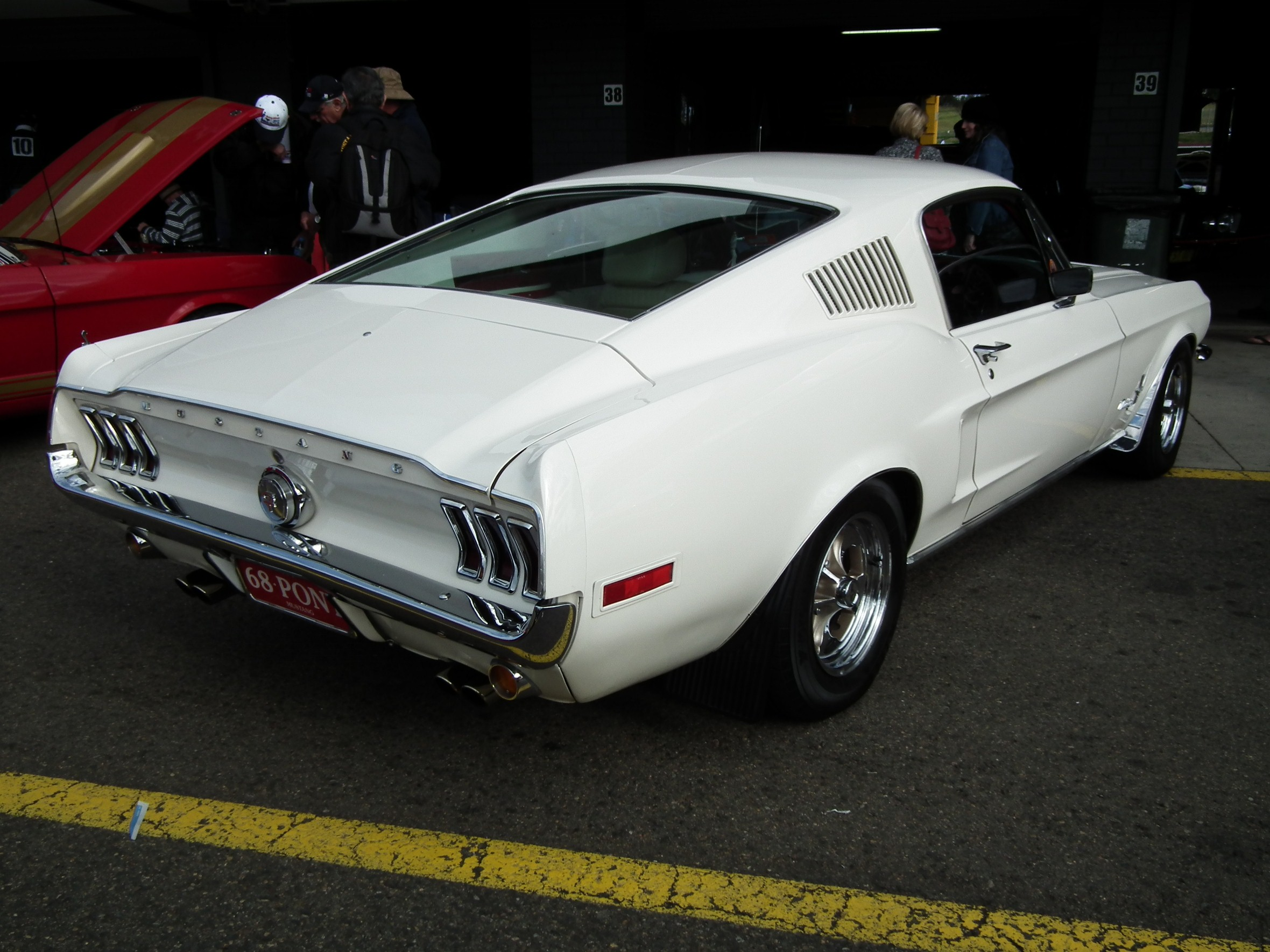
1968 Ford Mustang, a pony car fastback

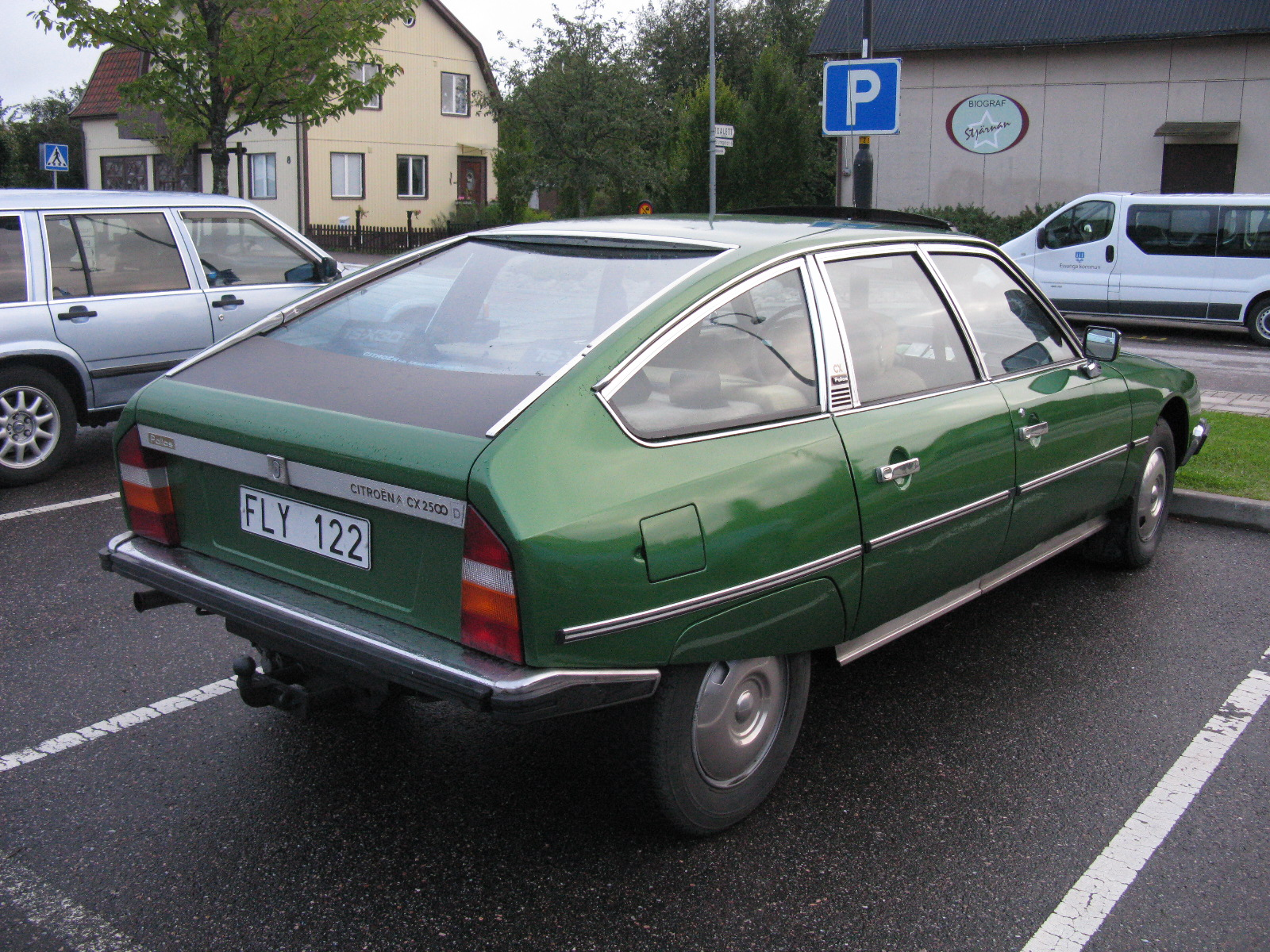
1978 Citroën CX 4-door fastback sedan

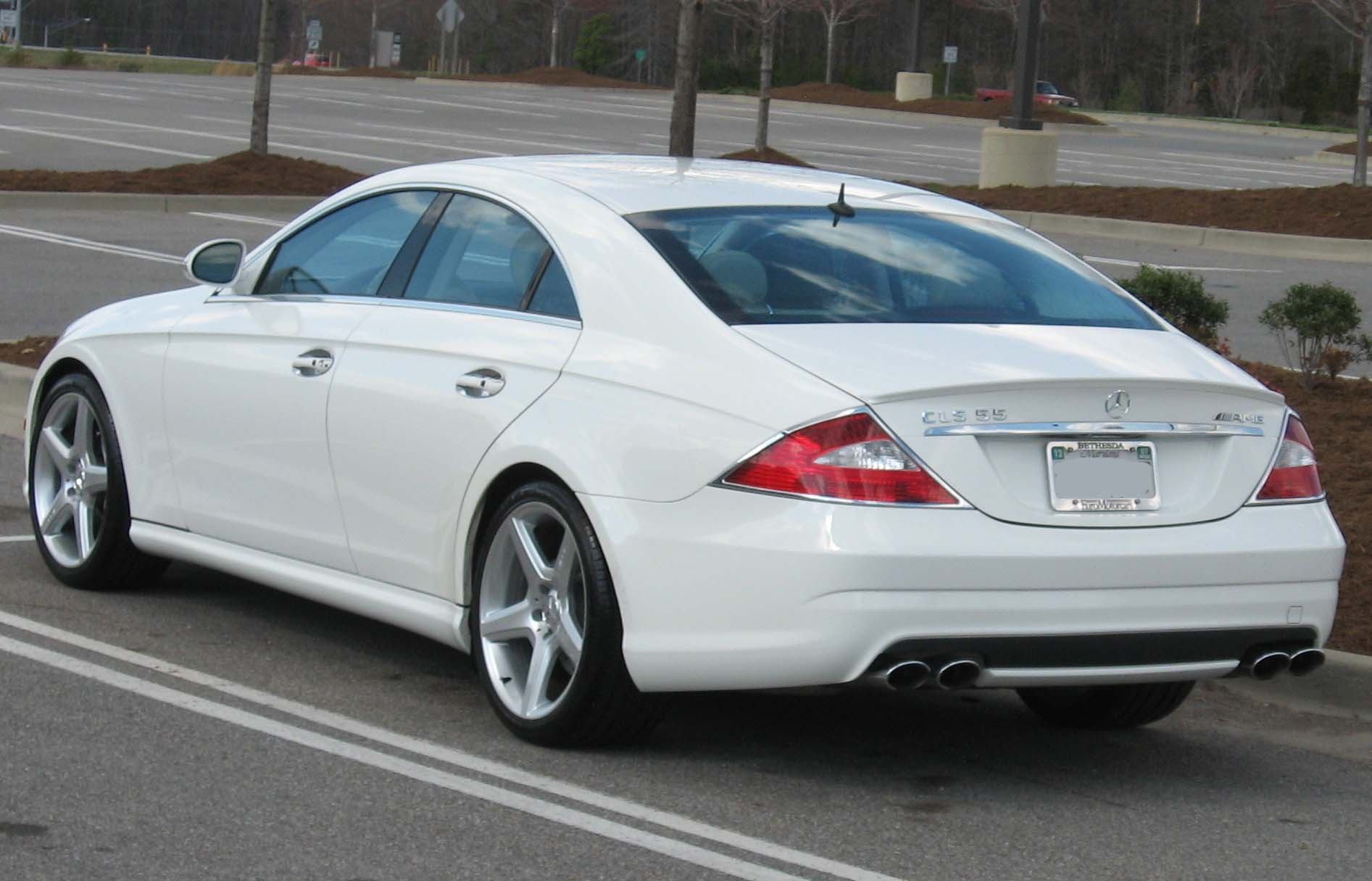
2006 Mercedes-Benz CLS55 AMG

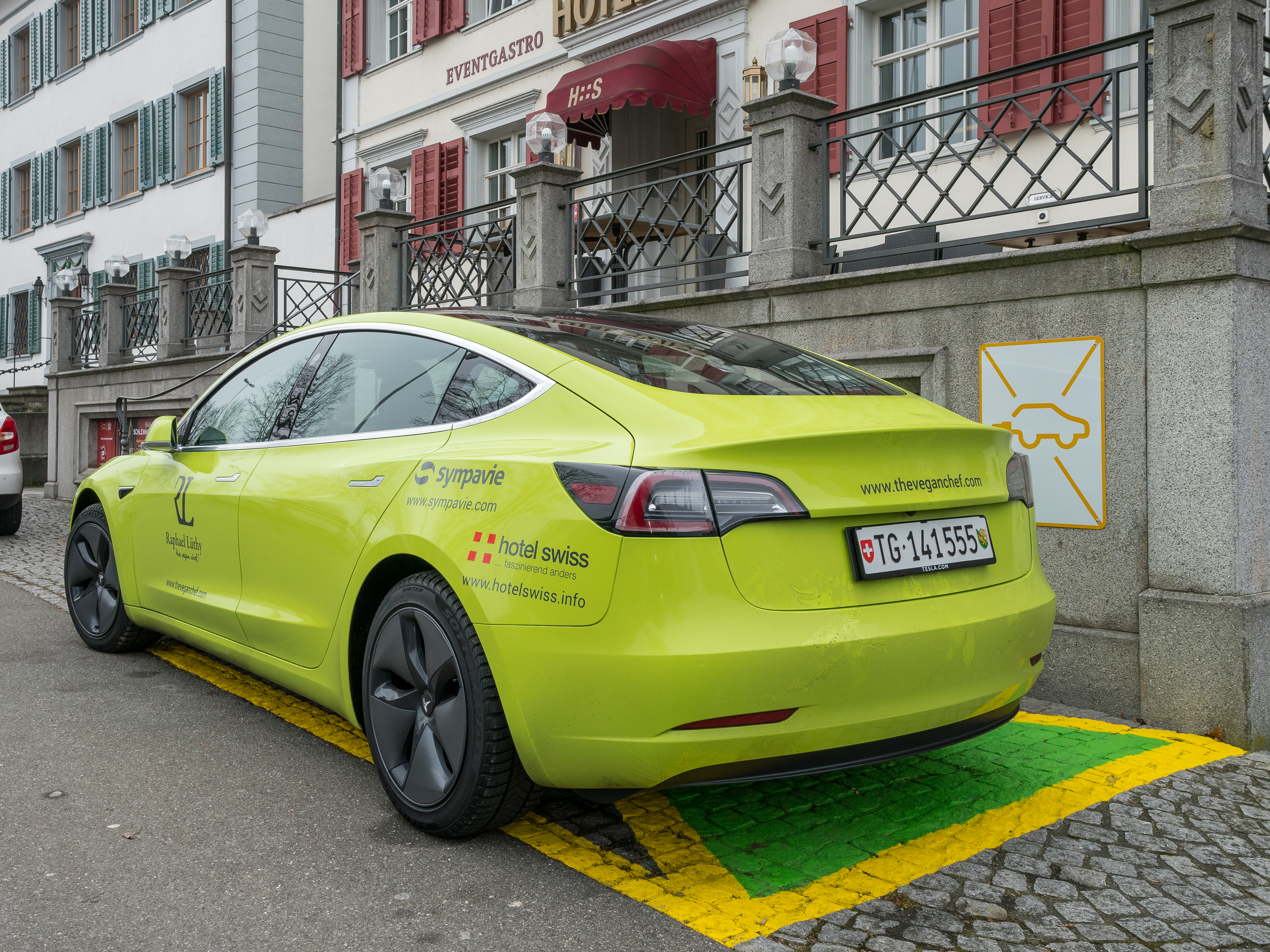
Unlike the Tesla Model S 5-door liftback, the Tesla Model 3 seen here is a 4-door fastback sedan (i.e. with a separate trunk)

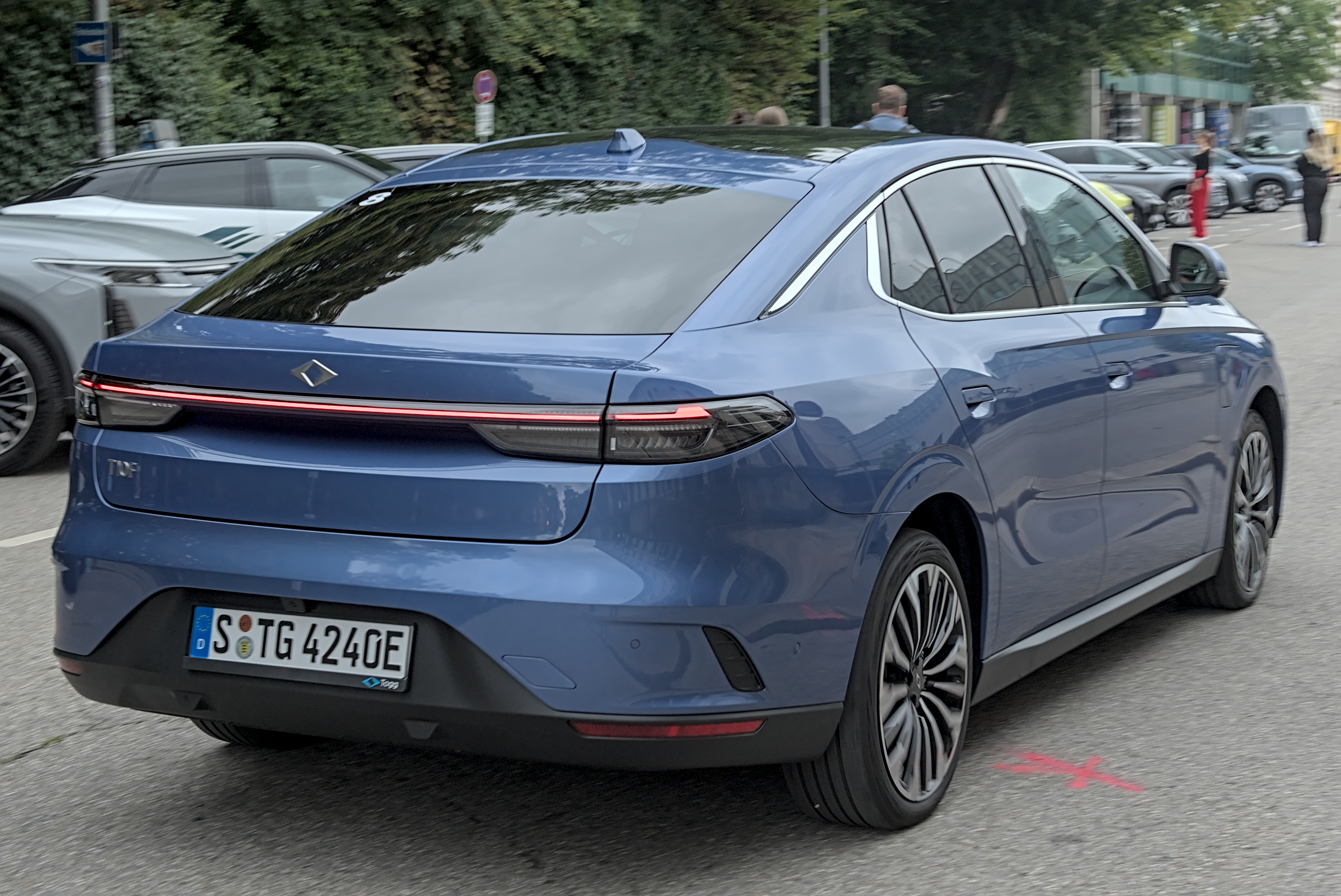
Togg T10F is another modern 4-door fastback sedan released in 2024 by Togg.

A fastback is an automotive styling feature, defined by the rear of the car having a single slope from the roof to the tail.

Some models, such as the Ford Mustang, have been marketed explicitly as fastbacks, often to differentiate them from other body styles (e.g. coupé models) in the same model range.

== Definition ==
A fastback is often defined as having a single slope from the roof to the rear of the vehicle.

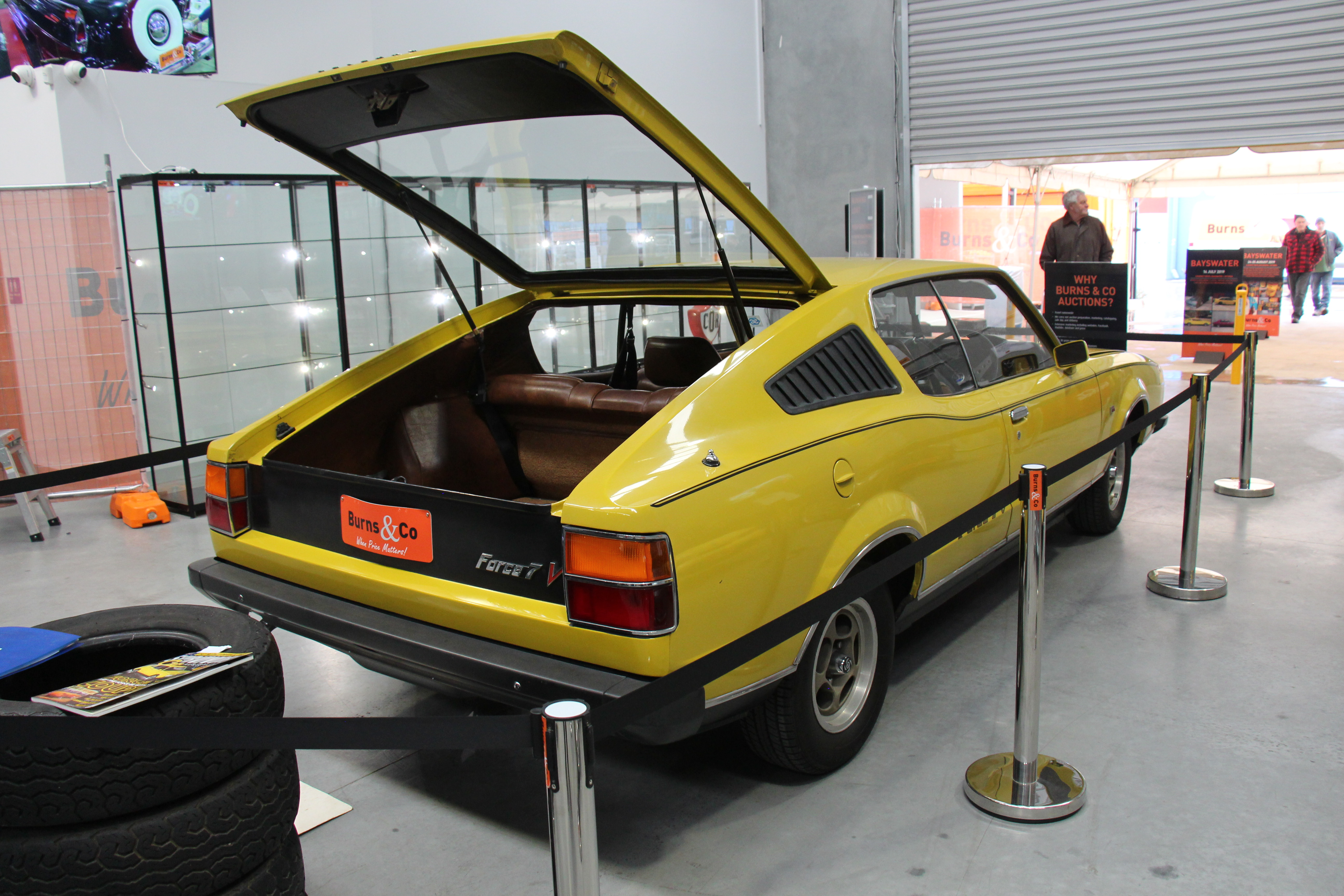
The 1974 Leyland P76 can be considered both a fastback (with a single uninterrupted slope from the roofline to the rear) and a liftback that is hinged at the roof

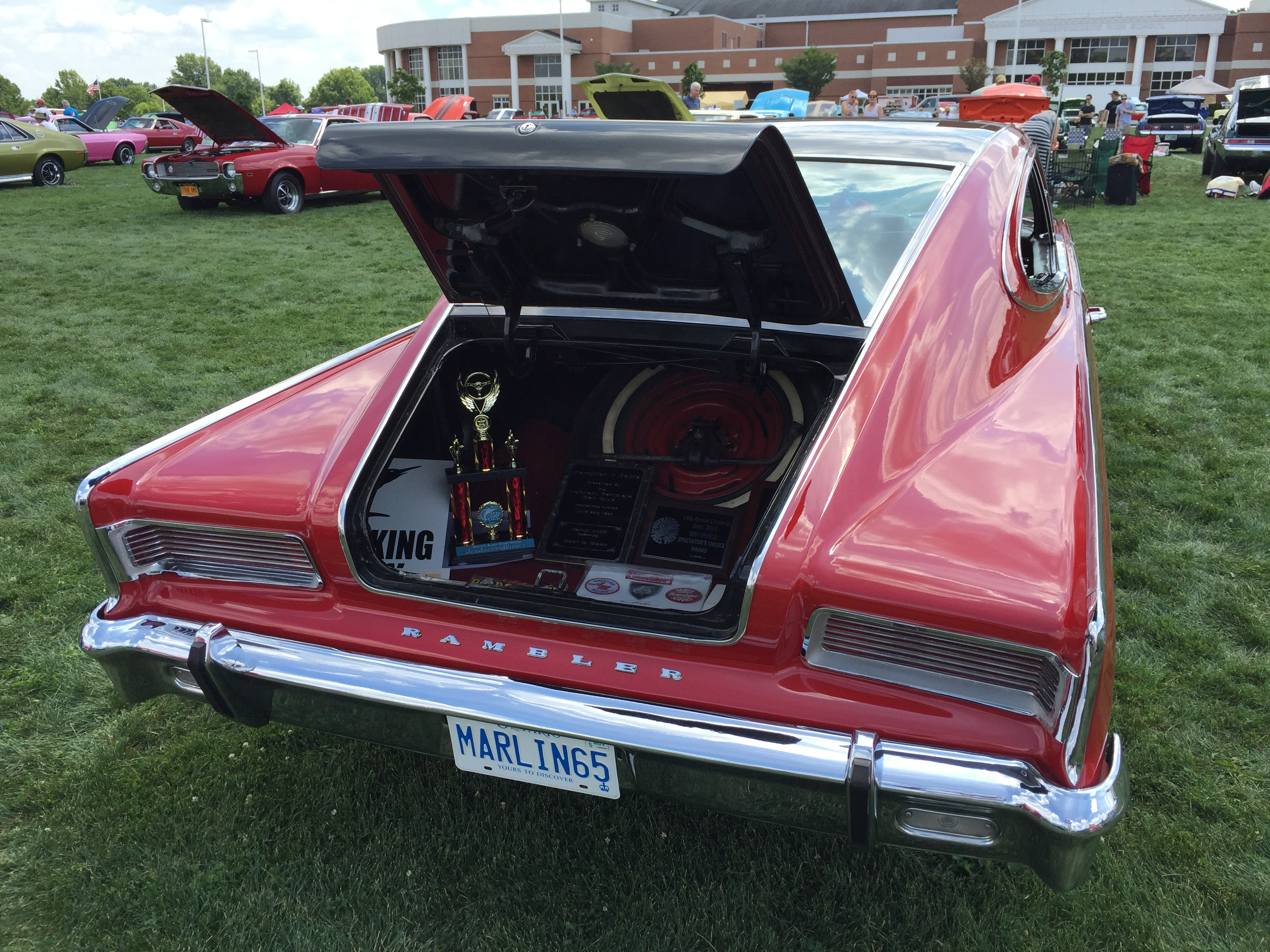
1965 Rambler Marlin fastback with trunk lid and a fixed rear window

Traditionally a fastback will have a trunk opening that is separate from the rear window which remains in a fixed position. The term "fastback" is not interchangeable with "liftback"; the former describes the car's shape, and the latter refers to a roof-hinged tailgate that lifts upwards for storage area access.

More specifically, the Road & Track Illustrated Automotive Dictionary defines the fastback as

A closed body style, usually a coupe but sometimes a sedan, with a roof sloped gradually in an unbroken line from the windshield to the rear edge of the car. A fastback naturally lends itself to a hatchback configuration and many have it, but not all hatchbacks are fastbacks and vice versa.

In the case of the Ford Mustang, the term "fastback" is used to differentiate against the coupé notchback body style, which has a steeper rear window followed by a horizontal trunk lid.

== History ==
Automobile designers in the 1930s began using elements of aircraft aerodynamics to streamline the boxy-looking vehicles of their day. Such designs, which were ahead of their time when exhibited during the early 1930s, included a droplet-like streamlining of the car's rear, a configuration similar to what would become known as the "fastback" 25 years later. Merriam-Webster first recognized the term "fastback" in 1954, many years before the popularization of the term "hatchback", which entered the dictionary in 1970. Opinions vary as to whether the terms are mutually exclusive.

Early examples of fastback cars include the 1929 Auburn Cabin Speedster, 1933 Cadillac V-16 Aerodynamic Coupe, 1935 Stout Scarab, 1933 Packard 1106 Twelve Aero Sport Coupe, Bugatti Type 57 Atlantic, Tatra 87, Porsche 356, Saab 92/96, Standard Vanguard, GAZ-M20 Pobeda, and Bentley Continental R-Type.

Fastbacks produce less turbulence (hence less drag) than conventional three-box (Tre volumi) designs

=== Australia ===
In Australia, fastbacks (known as "slopers") were introduced in 1935, first designed by General Motors' Holden as one of the available bodies on Oldsmobile, Chevrolet, and Pontiac chassis. The sloper design was added by Richards Body Builders in Australia to Dodge and Plymouth models in 1937; it was subsequently adopted by Ford Australia in 1939 and 1940, as well as a sloper style made on Nash chassis. According to automotive historian G.N. Georgano, "the Slopers were advanced cars for their day".

=== Europe ===
In Europe, there was a sloping rear on streamlined cars as early as 1945, from which the shapes of the Volkswagen Beetle and Porsche 356 are derived.

=== Japan ===
In Japan, the Toyota AA first adopted the fastback style in 1936. It was strongly influenced by the 1933 DeSoto Airflow. The 1965 Mitsubishi Colt 800 was the first post-war Japanese fastback, and the 1958 Subaru 360 was the first kei fastback. The Prince Skyline 1900 Sprint was developed by Prince Motor Company in 1963, but was never marketed.

Afterwards, all Japanese automakers adopted the fastback style, with the 1967 Honda N360, 1968 Nissan Sunny Coupe, 1968 Mazda Familia Rotary Coupe, 1970 Suzuki Fronte "Sting Ray Look", and 1971 Daihatsu Fellow Max. From the late 1960s to the 1970s, American coke bottle styling became popular in Japan, as seen on Toyota's 1973 Celica "Liftback".

=== North America ===
In North America, the numerous marketing terms for the fastback body style included "aerosedan", "club coupe", "sedanette" and "torpedo back". Cars included Cadillac's Series 61 and 62 Club Coupes, as well as various other models from General Motors, Ford, and Chrysler.

From the early 1940s until 1950, nearly every domestic manufacturer offered at least one fastback body style within their model lineups. Although the styling was good, the cars had less trunk capacity compared to the notchback designs. In the mid-1960s, the style was revived on many GM and Ford products until the mid-1970s.

== Aerodynamic advantages ==
Fastbacks provide an advantage in developing aerodynamic vehicles with a low drag coefficient. For example, although lacking a wind tunnel, Hudson designed its post-World War II cars to look aerodynamic, and "tests conducted by Nash later found that the Hudson had almost 20% less drag than contemporary notchback sedans". However, the aerodynamic teardrop shape meant lower headroom for rear seat passengers, limited visibility to the rear for the driver, and also meant a less practical, elongated rear end design.

== "4-door coupé" ==
Marketing terminology changed in 2004, with the launch of the first generation Mercedes-Benz CLS-Class. It was described as a 4-door coupé, a purely marketing term describing its fastback sedan arrangement, with fastback coupé-profiled bodywork and two doors on each side. The design reinterpreted the concept used in the 1992-1997 Infiniti J30/Nissan Leopard J Férié, which is not a true fastback.

This marketing term was followed by other competing models, such as the Audi A7 and the BMW 8 Series Gran Coupé, Audi A5 Sportback, BMW 4 Series Gran Coupé, Volkswagen CC, Volkswagen Arteon, Mercedes-Benz CLA-Class, Togg T10F, Aston Martin Rapide, and Porsche Panamera.

== See also ==
- List of fastback automobiles
- Coupe
- Sedan
- Hatchback
- Liftback
- Kammback
