= Bugatti Atlantic (concept car) =

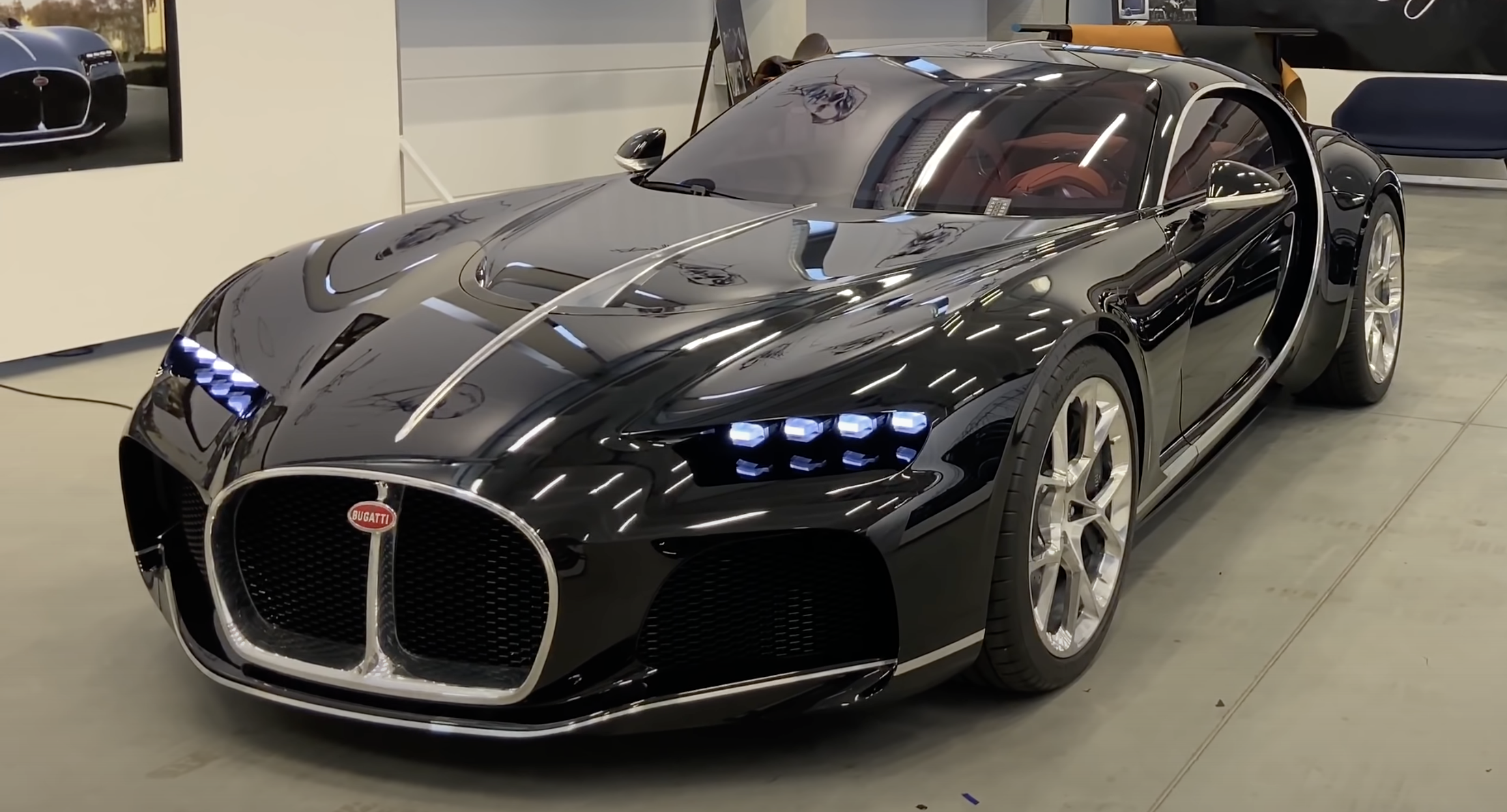

Overview
- Manufacturer: Bugatti Automobiles S.A.S.
- Production: 2015
- Assembly: Germany: Wolfsburg (Wolfsburg Volkswagen Plant)

Body and chassis
- Class: Concept car
- Body style: 2-door coupe
- Layout: Front-engine, rear-wheel-drive; Quad-motors individual-wheel drive
- Doors: Butterfly

Powertrain
- Engine: 3,993 cubic centimetres (243.7 cu in) TFSI Twin-turbo V8
- Electric motor: 4x AC synchronous electric motors
- Power output: 1,500 brake horsepower (1,100 kW); 1,475 pound force-feet (2,000 N⋅m) (Projected)
- Transmission: 7-speed Transaxle LDF dual clutch; 4 individual single-ratio transmissions
- Battery: Li-ion

Dimensions
- Kerb weight: 4,009 pounds (1,818 kg)

The Bugatti Atlantic is a modern version of the Bugatti Atlantic Type 57. It remained as a prototype and was built in Wolfsburg, the headquarters of Volkswagen. It is also nicknamed the Bugatti Pebble.

== Overview ==
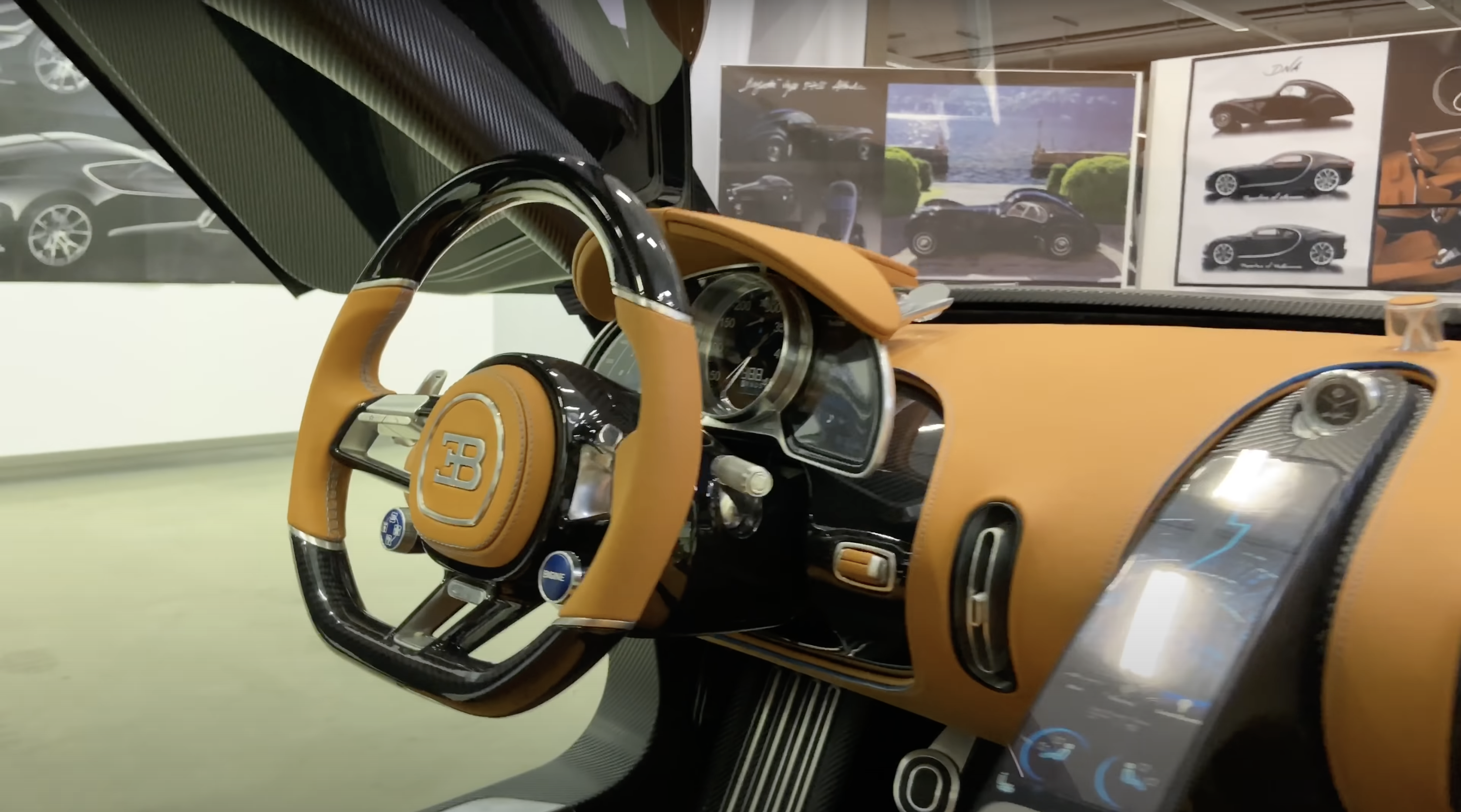
Interior

The Atlantic incorporates several elements of the Volkswagen Group, which would have made the car less expensive than the other Bugattis marketed at the time, and therefore make it its entry-level.

The Volkswagen emissions scandal, which implicated the parent company put an end to the project, as it did to others. This prevented a presentation of the Atlantic at the Geneva Motor Show in 2016 and at Pebble Beach in 2015.

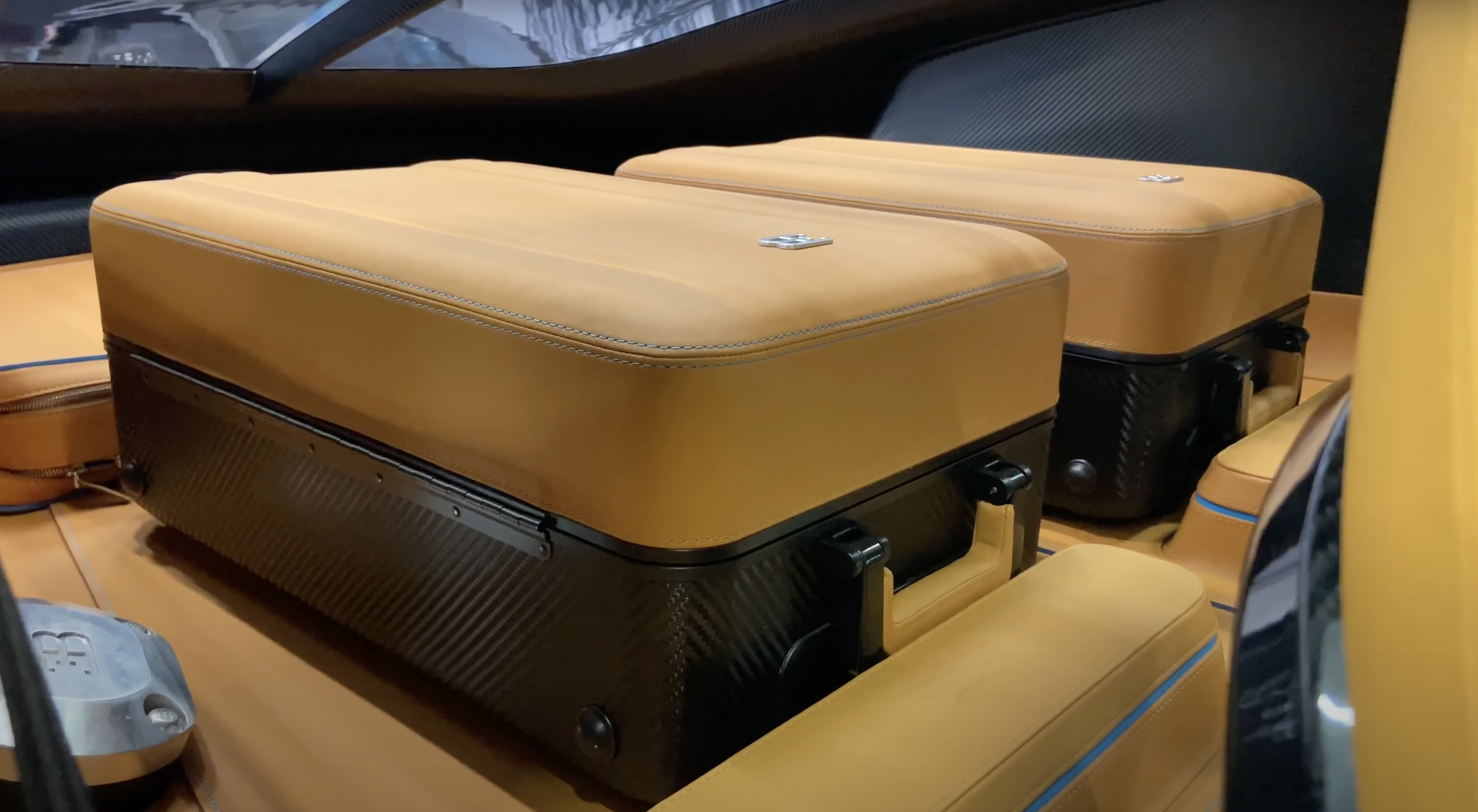
Luggages

A 4-liter V8 engine was intended for it, as well as a carbon chassis. Two models were planned for sale, namely the coupe and roadster versions, with thermal or electric engines. The vehicle was also to benefit from technological research intended for the Porsche Taycan. A chrome backbone runs from the hood to the rear, recalling and therefore paying homage to the 1936 modern car.
