= Model 50 =

Model 50 may refer to:

== Aircraft ==
- Aeronca Model 50 Chief, a civil utility aircraft first flown in 1938
- Beech Model 50 Twin Bonanza, a twin-piston-engine utility aircraft introduced in 1951
- Boeing Model 50, also known as the Boeing XPB, a one-of-a-kind flying boat first flown in 1925
- Curtiss Model 50 Robin, a high-wing monoplane introduced in 1928
- Fleet Model 50 Freighter, a twin-engine biplane transport aircraft first flown in 1938

== Firearms ==
- Model 50 Reising, a submachine gun produced by Harrington & Richardson
- Smith & Wesson Model 50, a double-action revolver

== Motorcycles ==
- Norton Model 50, a touring motorcycle
- Model 50 WLA, a military motorcycle produced by Harley-Davidson during World War II

== Other ==
- IBM PS/2 Model 50, a midrange member of the PS/2 family of personal computers
- IBM System/360 Model 50, a midrange member of the System/360 family of mainframe computers
- Obusier de 155 mm Modèle 50, a French field howitzer produced during the Cold War
- VAX 4000 Model 50, an upgrade kit for two of Digital Equipment Corporation's low-end superminicomputers

== See also ==
- M50 (disambiguation)
- Type 50 (disambiguation)
