= 5T =

5T may refer to:

- 5T (gang)
- Canadian North IATA code
- 5T, a model of HPI Savage
- HP 5T, Windows codepage 1254 in Hewlett-Packard printers
- OnePlus 5T, a smartphone
- 5T, the production code for the 1981 Doctor Who serial The Keeper of Traken

== See also ==
- T5 (disambiguation)
