= T50 =

T50 may refer to:

== Automobiles ==
- 50 Turismo (T50), an Italian motorcycle
- Borg-Warner T-50 transmission, an automobile transmission
- Gordon Murray Automotive T.50, a British sports car
- Jiabao T50, a Chinese microvan

== Aviation ==
- Boeing T50, a turboshaft engine
- Cessna T-50, an American passenger aircraft
- KAI T-50 Golden Eagle, a South Korean jet trainer
- Sukhoi T-50, a Russian stealth fighter jet
- Slingsby T.50 Skylark 4, a British glider

== Other uses ==
- T.50 (standard), an ITU-T character encoding standard
- Canon T50, a film camera
- T-50 tank, a Soviet light tank
- Telford T50, a footpath in England

== See also ==
- Type 50 (disambiguation)
- T5 (disambiguation)
