= Type 50 =

Type 50 may refer to:

- Bugatti Type 50, motor vehicle produced by the auto-maker Bugatti
- Peugeot Type 50, motor vehicle produced by the auto-maker Peugeot
- Steyr 50, a small car released in 1936 by the Austrian automobile manufacturer Steyr
- Type 50, a Chinese licensed copy of the Soviet submachine gun PPSh-41
- GMA T.50, a car designed by Gordon Murray

== See also ==
- Type 5 (disambiguation)
- T50 (disambiguation)
- 50 (disambiguation)
- Class 50 (disambiguation)
