= T5 =

T5 or T-5 may refer to:

== Biology and medicine ==
- Fifth thoracic vertebrae
- Fifth spinal nerve
- Bacteriophage T5, a bacteriophage
- T5: an EEG electrode site according to the 10-20 system

== Vehicles and transportation ==
- AIDC T-5 Brave Eagle, a Taiwanese jet trainer aircraft.
- Ford T5, a Ford Mustang built for export to Germany
- Fuji T-5, a 1988 Japanese turboprop-driven primary trainer aircraft
- Volkswagen Transporter, a van
- a model of the OS T1000 train of the Oslo Metro
- Île-de-France tramway Line 5, one of the Tramways in Île-de-France
- Borg-Warner T-5 transmission
- T5 engine (disambiguation), a range of Volvo automobile engines
- T5 Cumberland Line, a Sydney Trains service, Australia
- T5 (Istanbul Tram), a tram line in Istanbul, Turkey
- T5 road (Tanzania), a road in Tanzania
- T5 road (Zambia), a road in Zambia
- Turkmenistan Airlines, IATA airline designator
- Terminal 5 at JFK Airport in New York City
- Heathrow Terminal 5
- Forthing T5, a Chinese compact crossover SUV
- Brisbane Airport line (numbered T5), a Queensland Rail service, Australia
- Varsity Lakes line (numbered T5), a Queensland Rail service, Australia
- Cooper Mark II, aka Cooper T5, a single seater racing car

== Pop culture ==
- Tele 5 (Poland), a TV channel
- Thunderbird 5, an episode in the Thunderbird TV series
- Telecinco, a Spanish TV channel
- The fifth edition of the role-playing game Traveller
- Tekken 5, a 2004 fighting game
- Terminator Genisys, Terminator 5, the fifth film in the Terminator film franchise

== Other ==
- T_{5} space, a completely normal and Hausdorff space
- T5 fluorescent lamp
- T-5 torpedo, a Soviet torpedo with a nuclear warhead
- The Torx T5 (sometimes written T-5) or compatible screw drives
- Tungsten T5, a PDA
- Rebel T5, the model name used in the Americas for the Canon EOS 1200D digital camera
- Tapestry 5, a Java-based web application framework
- SPARC T5, a processor chip by the Sun division of Oracle, and also the servers built around it
- A tornado intensity rating on the TORRO scale
- T5 (language model), a language model series by Google AI

== See also ==
- 5T (disambiguation)
