= HPI Savage =

Savage

Overview
- Manufacturer: Hobby Products International
- Production: 2002-present

Body and chassis
- Layout: Right-side mid-engine, four-wheel drive
- Related: HotBodies TRUCKZILLA

Powertrain
- Engine: 4.1 cc "NitroStar" S-25 (nitromethane); 3.5 cc "NitroStar" 21BB/F3.5 (nitromethane); 4.6 cc "NitroStar" F4.6, K4.6 (nitromethane); 5.9 cc "NitroStar" K5.9 (nitromethane)
- Transmission: 2-speed Savage automatic; 2-speed Savage X automatic; 2-speed Savage X automatic with reverse; 3-speed Savage X automatic

HPI Savage is a line of radio-controlled monster trucks manufactured in Japan by Hobby Products International of Foothill Ranch, California, US.

The overall setup of the Savage, with its massive tires and tall suspension, make it a perfect truck for bashing, and also enables the model to be able to withstand tremendous abuse. The Savage is used for "bashing", which consists of jumps, flips, etc. and it shines in this area. New for 2016 are the Savage XL Octane V2, Savage XL F5.9 and Savage XL Flux.

Several hobbyists have had success using the Savage for high speed using option tires and gearing. The current RC monster truck world speed record is held by a Savage, at 74 MPH.

== Savage 21 ==
The original, ready-to-run (RTR) Savage 21 served as the foundation for the many vehicles that came after. It featured a unique boxed chassis with parallel aluminum panels (known as Twin Vertical Plates, TVP) surrounding the transmission and drive axles, two-speed transmission, heavy-duty slipper clutch, eight oil-filled coilover shock absorbers, 4 inches of suspension travel, four-wheel drive, HPI .21ci (3.4 cc) pull-start engine with rear exhaust and an HPI 27 MHz three-channel pistol grip radio. A "reverse module," sold separately, mounts inside the transmission, where it replaces an idler gear assembly. It utilizes the factory-installed radio's non-proportional third channel and an additional servo to add the convenience and fun of reverse when the model is first brought to a complete stop.

== Savage SS ==
Shortly after the Savage 21 was released, the Savage SS (Super Sport, meaning kit version) was released. It was an unassembled version of the Savage, based on the Savage 21, but came with some pre-included option parts such as an aluminum tuned pipe and an upgraded S-25 engine. The S-25 engine later became standard in the Savage 25 RTR. Unlike the RTR versions of the Savage, the SS version was supplied without radio gear based on the assumption that drivers already had advanced radio systems perfect for the Savage SS.

== Savage 25 ==
The Savage 21 was replaced by the updated Savage 25. This version added both a larger HPI .25ci (4.1 cc) engine, the S-25, for additional power and torque as well as HPI's unique "Roto-Start" electric starter system. The Roto-Start kept the weight-saving advantages of the pull start with the extra added convenience of electric starting via an external electric starter. This starter, standard on most new HPI RTR models, incorporates a gear-driven one-way bearing mounted on the engine in lieu of the pull starter. The external starter is a motor-driven gearbox which spins a hexagonal steel shaft and is powered by a standard 7.2-volt nickel cadmium battery pack. A pinned ball joint at the end of the shaft mates with a socket on the rear of the engine-mounted one-way bearing assembly. The system has proven to be a popular one, with third-party engine manufacturers such as O.S. Engines and Team Orion designing their replacement engines to accept the assembly. A limited-edition version of the Savage 25 added a three-speed transmission along with updated wheels and tires. These parts can easily be retrofitted to previous versions.

== Savage ATV ==
A mechanically identical (save for springs) variation of the Savage 25 replaces that model's Lexan pickup truck body with that of a Kawasaki KFX700 all-terrain vehicle (ATV) with articulated rider figure designed to move with the model's steering motions.

== Savage 4.6 SS ==
When the Savage 25 was released, the Savage 4.6 SS kit was updated to include the more powerful engine, improved differentials and other upgrades. A ready-to-run version, the Savage 25 Limited Edition, added colored shock absorber springs, a 3-speed transmission, and a commemorative bodyshell to differentiate it from the kit version.

== E-Savage ==
An electric version, dubbed E-Savage, is a 1/10 scale version similar in design to the original. It is powered by two HPI "GT550" 14.4v electric motors and competes in the market defined by models such as the Traxxas E-Maxx and Kyosho Twin Force. It shares no parts at all with the full size Savage because it is simply a rebadged Hot Bodies E-Zilla.

There is also an E-Savage Sport. The only difference between the E-Savage and the E-Savage Sport is that the Sport does not include the battery packs and charger.

== Savage X ==
The next ready-to-run version was the Savage X. It had a new Force Engine-built 25 motor. The Savage X has addressed the criticisms of the original twin chassis design, which were poor radio box access and difficult access to the differentials. The enlarged radio box is now easier to open and the differentials can now be removed from the new "split bulkhead" design by removing only 6 screws. The new chassis plates lower the motor and transmission slightly to improve CG, and it now includes a standard composite roll bar and detachable roll hoop to protect the engine.

== Savage X SS ==
A variation on the Savage X, the Savage X SS, has a .28ci (4.6cc) engine that has 10% more displacement than the S-25 Model. The Savage X SS also features a hardened steel spur gear, chromed dog bones and 6 gear spider diffs for enhanced drivetrain durability to cope with the extra power of the .28 engine. With this engine the SS version will easily pull wheel stands and an optional wheelie bar is available for the Savage to prevent it from flipping over backwards under hard acceleration.

== Savage X 4.6 ==
At the end of summer 2007, HPI released the Savage X 4.6 RTR. This model features the Force Engine-made F4.6 motor. The new F4.6 motor retains the reliability of HPI's motors while adding more power, though it is not as powerful as the K4.6. The driveline has been upgraded with new alloy differential cases, reversion to the more reliable 21/25-style slipper clutch, and a dual fiberglass brake disc kit. The clutchbell is now a 17 tooth unit. In 2011, HPI released a newer model of the Savage X 4.6. The Savage X 4.6 has a top speed of over 45 MPH.

== Savage XL ==
Released in April 2008. This Savage includes a new K5.9 (.36) motor with aluminum tuned pipe and a stretched chassis. Several changes have been made to improve on the truck, including stronger diff gears, steel spur gear, uprated driveshafts, thicker chassis, metal geared steering servo, aluminum clutch shoes, 3-speed gearbox as stock, and much more. New wheels and tires and a new body complete the truck, which is RTR and comes with a rechargeable receiver pack and charger.

== Savage Flux HP ==
In 2009 HPI released the first electric variant of the Savage monster truck, the Savage Flux HP. The Savage Flux HP offers a simple, easy, plug-and-go alternative to the Nitro versions of the Savage. Unlike the nitro-powered Savage, whose engine requires a break-in procedure , the only thing needed to get the Savage Flux HP up and running is a pair of battery packs.

The Savage Flux HP is capable of speeds up to 62 mph with the standard brushless motor.

== Savage Flux 2350 ==
The Savage Flux 2350 is a modified version of the Savage Flux HP. The savage Flux HP could handle up to 6 cells were as the flux 2350 could only handle 4 cells, in effect making it the budget minded model.

== Savage 5T ==
The Savage 5T is the largest out of the series. Compared to the XL, the main difference is the further elongated TVPs and accommodating driveshaft which provide enough space for a secondary fuel tank. The elongated TVPs measure at 562mm long, making the chassis long enough for a Baja 5T body to fit with proper body posts. In addition to the longer chassis, the Savage 5T also uses enlarged wheel hexes for use with Baja 5T wheels. Because of the Baja look, some like to call it the "Nitro Baja" even though the body has Savage 5T decals designating the model. Even with these major differences, it's still a Savage XL with a K5.9 and the 3-speed Savage X optional transmission. The 5T was only distributed in Japan and the European market, never officially arriving in the US, and has been since discontinued.

== Savage XS Flux ==
The Savage XS Flux is a Brushless Mini version of the Savage. It is a (2/3 Savage Flux) 1/10 scale. With a top speed of 65+ MPH Savage XS Flux It uses the Flux VEKTOR 4000 motor and VAPOR Pro ESC and uses 2S or 3S LiPo packs, standard size. The XS is also Waterproof.

== Savage XL Octane ==
Hobby Products International (HPI) announced that the Savage Octane was to be based on the Savage XL platform and equipped with a 15cc, petrol-fueled, 2-stroke engine. Availability for purchase was originally announced for 2012, but the release date was pushed into 2013. Then further delayed release of the Savage XL Octane to 2014, claiming it was under further development.

The final release date was spring 2014, With the models shipping a few weeks after the announcement. A few design changes took place including different chassis plates and rollover protection to accommodate the larger motor and cooling needs, as well as a redesigned shell and livery.

== Savage xl F5.9 ==
New for 2016 is the Savage xl 5.9; this new model includes a front-mounted fuel tank like the Savage Octane and a powerful F5.9 nitro engine.
