= Bugatti Type 46 =

Touring car

Bugatti Type 46 Bugatti Type 50
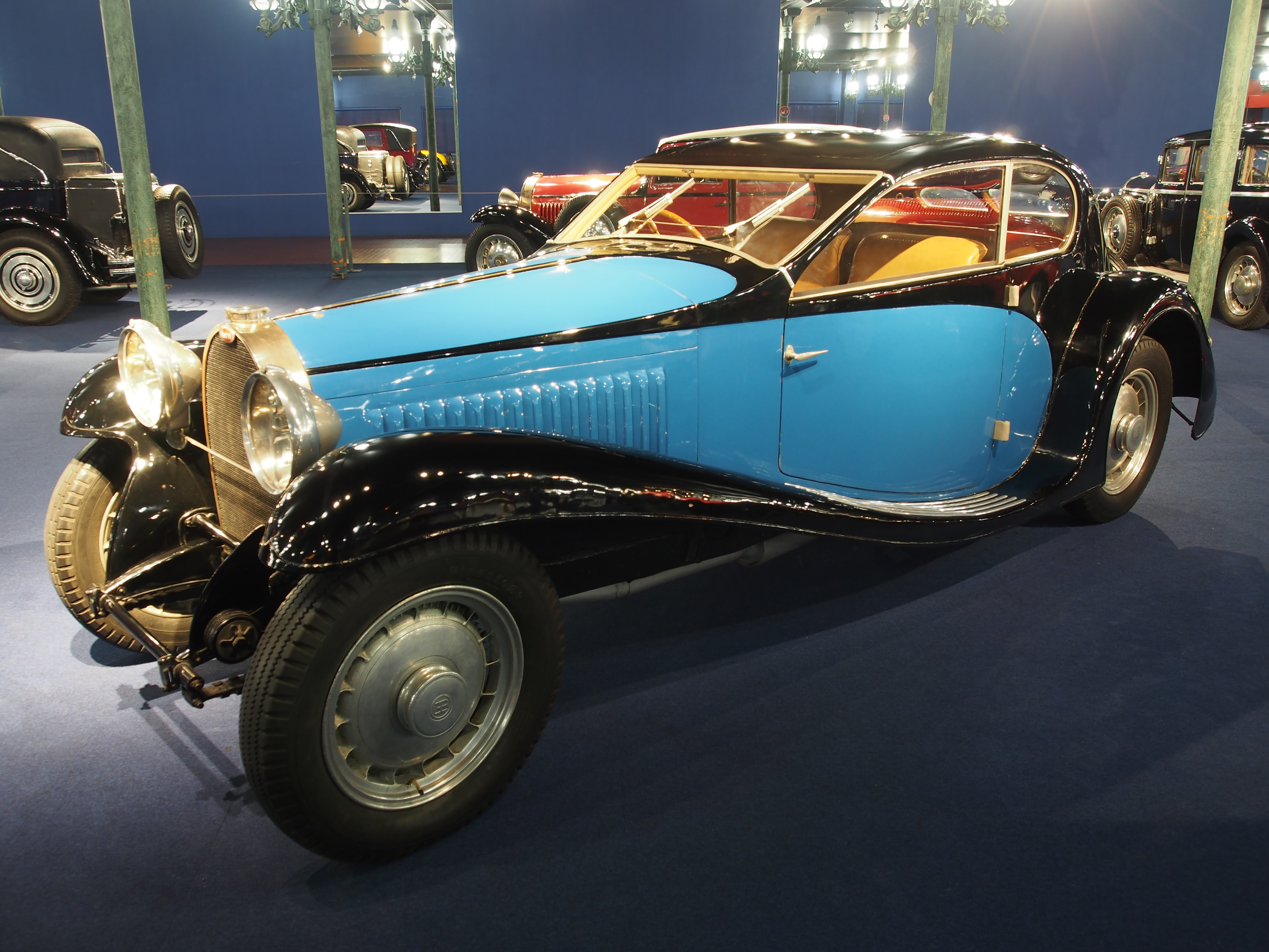
- 1933 Bugatti Type 46 rebodied

Overview
- Manufacturer: Bugatti
- Production: 1929–1936; 462 produced
- Assembly: France: Molsheim, Alsace (Usine Bugatti de Molsheim)

Body and chassis
- Class: Grand tourer
- Layout: FR layout
- Related: Bugatti Type 57

Powertrain
- Engine: 5,359 cc (327 cu in) I8; 4,972 cc (303 cu in) I8
- Transmission: 4-speed manual

Dimensions
- Wheelbase: 3,505 mm (138.0 in) (Type 46); 3,099 mm (122.0 in) (Type 50)

The Bugatti Type 46 and later Type 50 and Type 50B were touring cars produced by Bugatti from 1929 to 1936.

== Type 46 ==
The Type 46 used a 5.4 L (5359 cc/327 in^{3}) straight-8 engine with 3 valves per cylinder driven by a single overhead camshaft. Power was reported at 140 hp (104 kW). The engine was undersquare like most Bugatti designs with an 81 mm bore and 130 mm stroke.

The Type 46 was a large car, weighing 2500 lb (1134 kg) and riding on a 138 in (3505 mm) wheelbase. 400 examples were produced from the end of 1929 through 1936. The three speed gearbox was in unit with the live rear axle, resulting in high unsprung weight, and a relatively harsh ride. Despite this, the model was a favourite of Ettore Bugatti.

=== Type 46S ===
A supercharged version, the Type 46S, was introduced in 1930. With just 160 hp (119 kW), from its Rootes-type blower, it was not a great success. 18 supercharged cars were made in all.

== Type 50 ==
The Type 50 was a sporting coupe version of the Type 46. It rode on a shorter wheelbase, 122 in (3099 mm), and used a smaller 5.0 L (4972 cc/303 in^{3}) version of the engine. This engine had squarer dimensions, however, at 86 by 107 mm, and twin camshafts actuated two valves per cylinder. Power output was impressive at 225 hp (167 kW). Many cars had landaulet roofs and Bugatti-style two-tone paint.

=== Type 50T ===
The Type 50 Touring was a sedan version of the Type 50. It used the same 138 in (3505 mm) wheelbase as its predecessor, the Type 46, but shared the 5.0 L engine of the Type 50. The engine was tuned for torque, though, with just 200 hp (149 kW) on tap. In total, 65 Type 50 and Type 50T Bugattis were produced between 1930 and 1934.

=== Type 50B ===
A racing version, the Type 50B, was also produced. It shared the 5.0 L 2-valve engine but was blown to produce 470 hp (350 kW). It was used from 1937 through 1939. A pair of these engines were installed in the Bugatti P100 airplane, with specially cast magnesium crankcases.

== Gallery ==
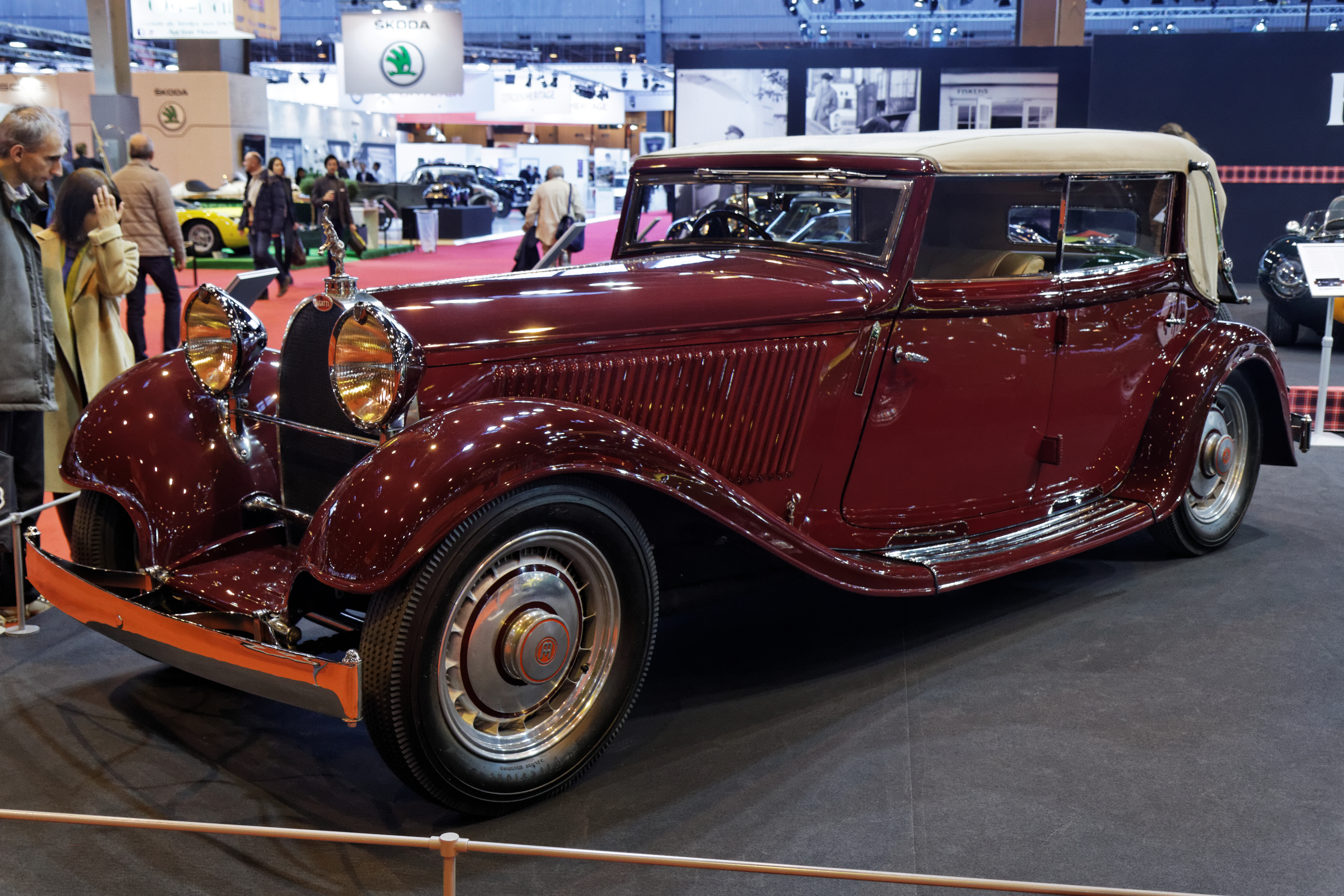
1931 Bugatti Type 46S 4-door saloon Reinbolt & Christé

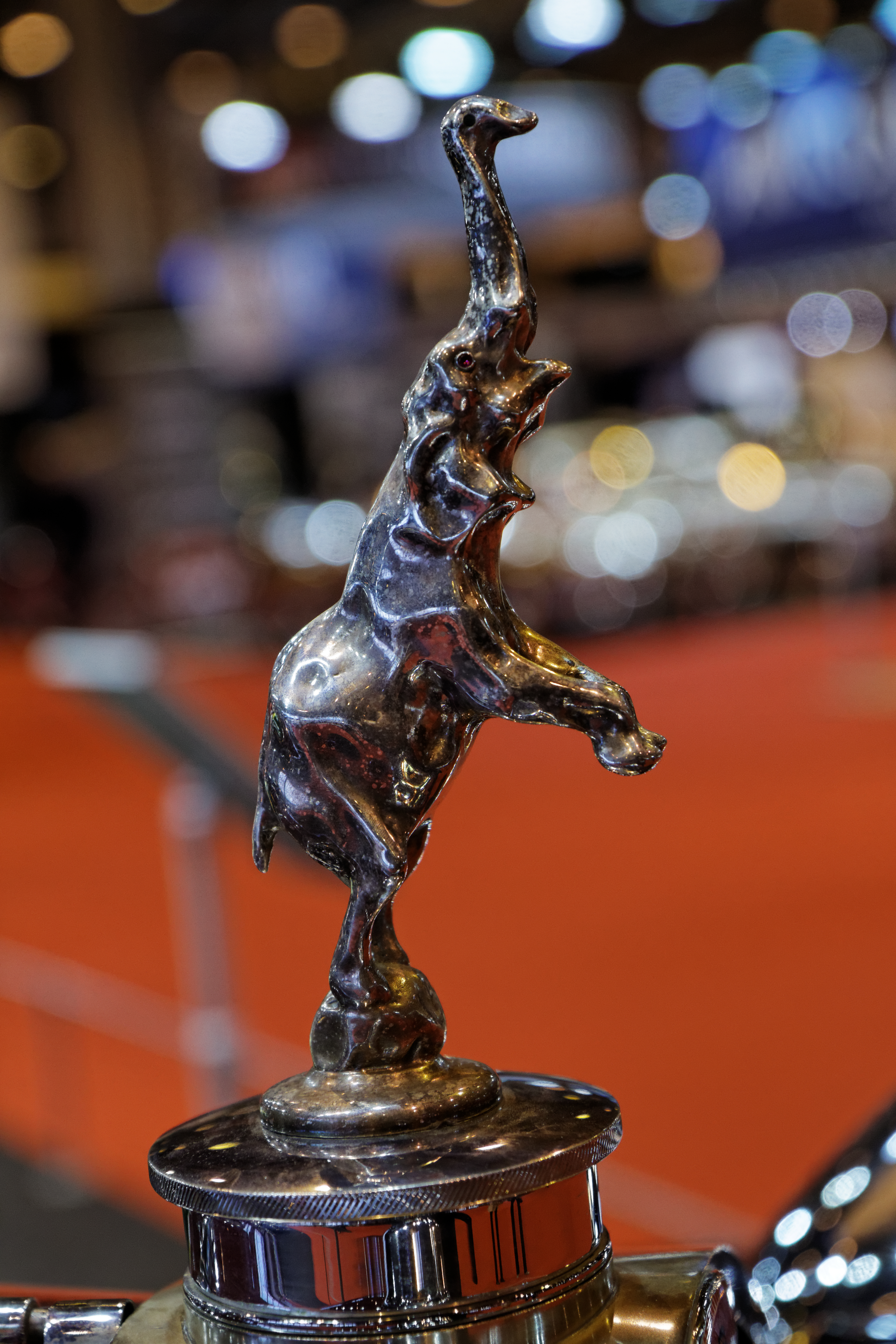
1931 Bugatti Type 46S 4-door saloon Reinbolt & Christé the "elephant" adiator cap, a sculpture by Rembrandt Bugatti.

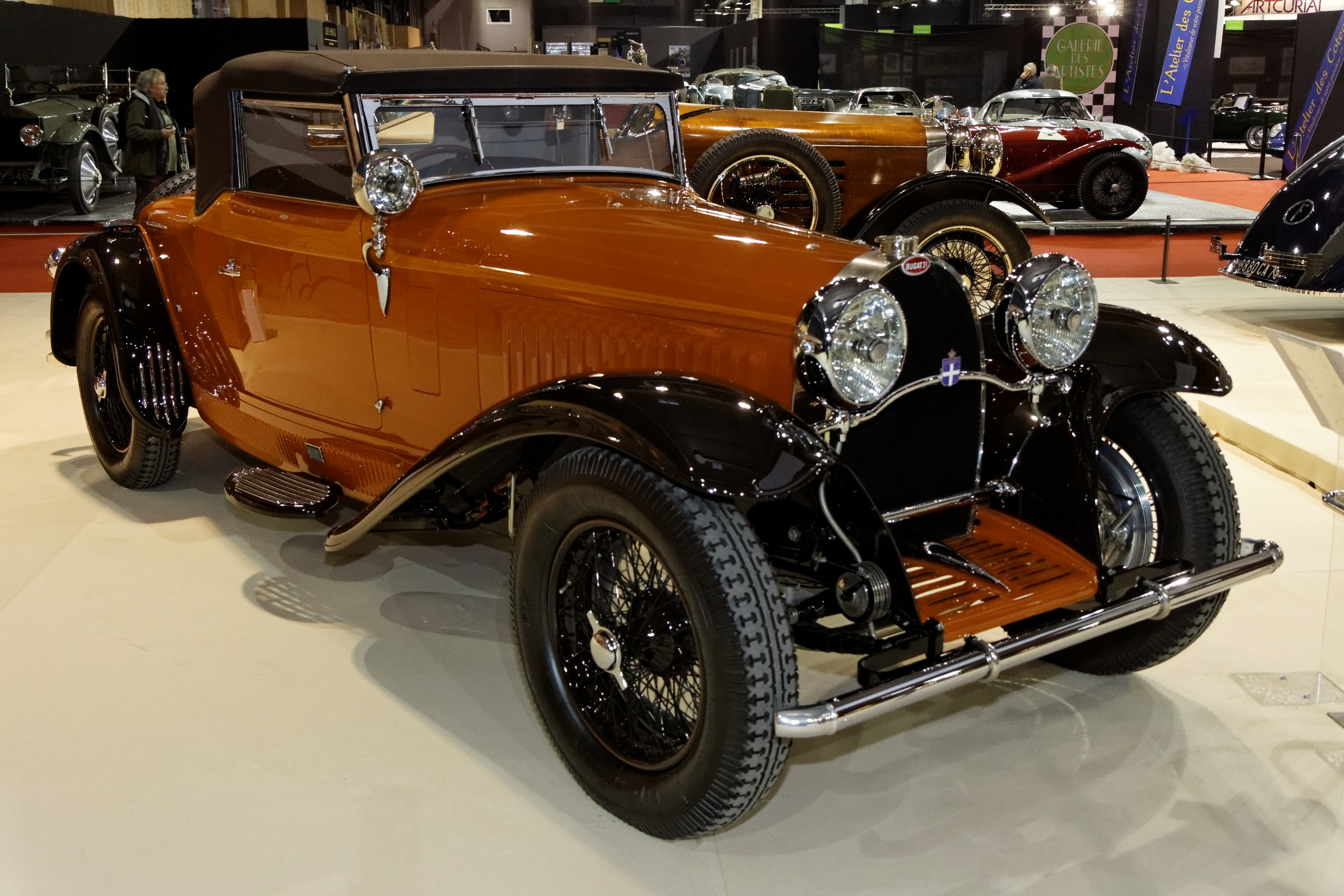
1930 Bugatti Type 46 two-seater

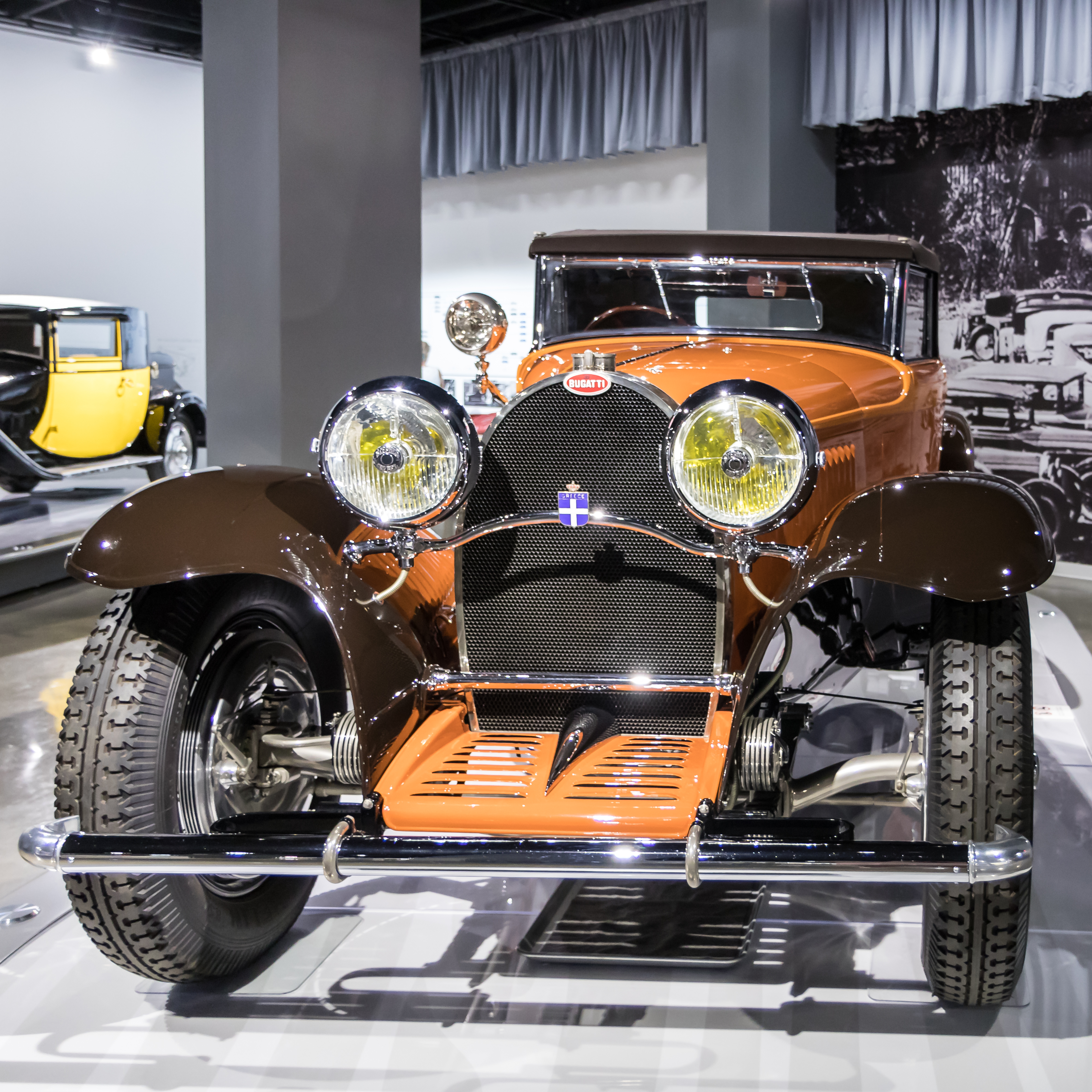
1930 Bugatti Type 46 two-seater

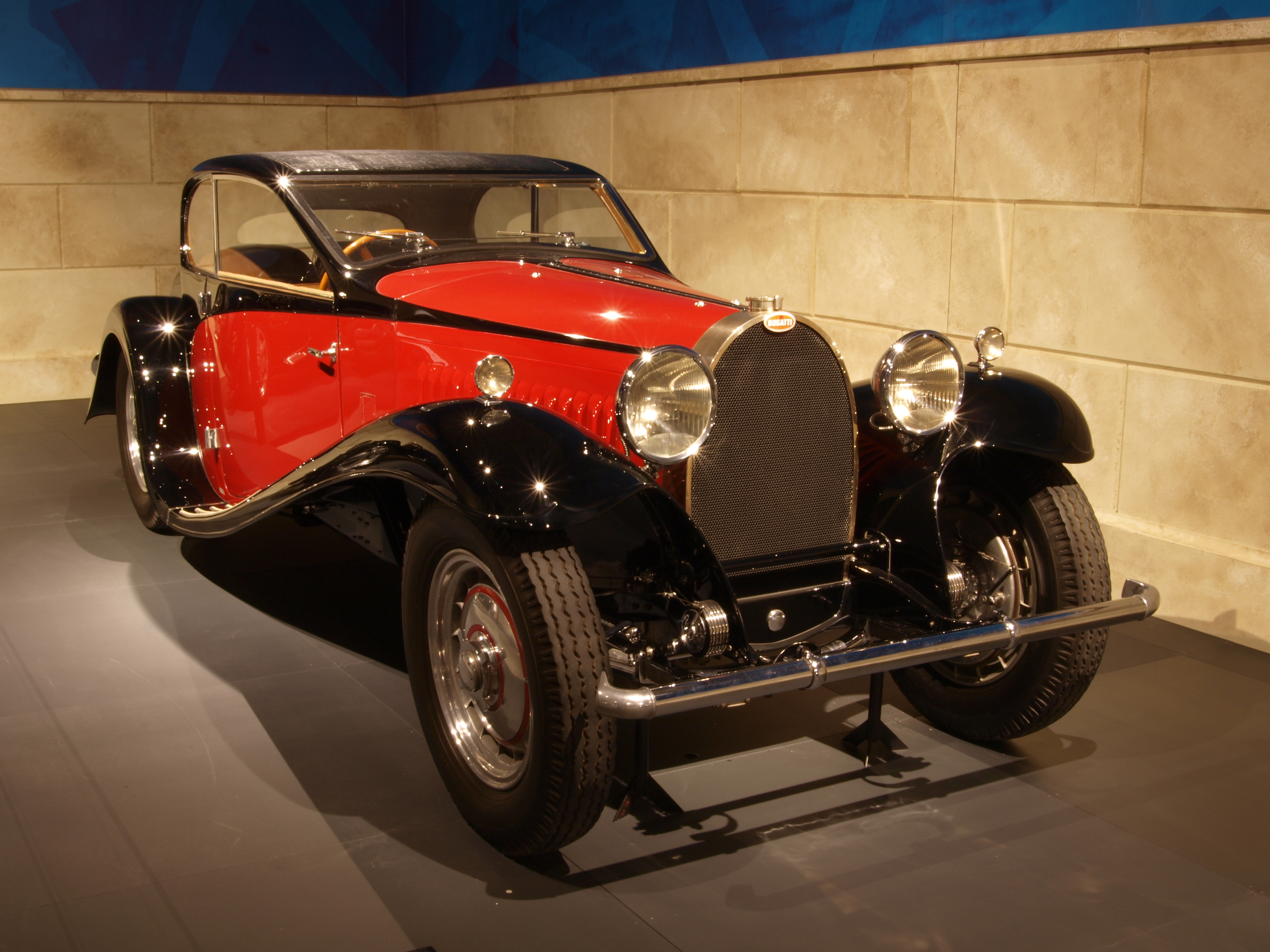
1932 Bugatti Type 50T

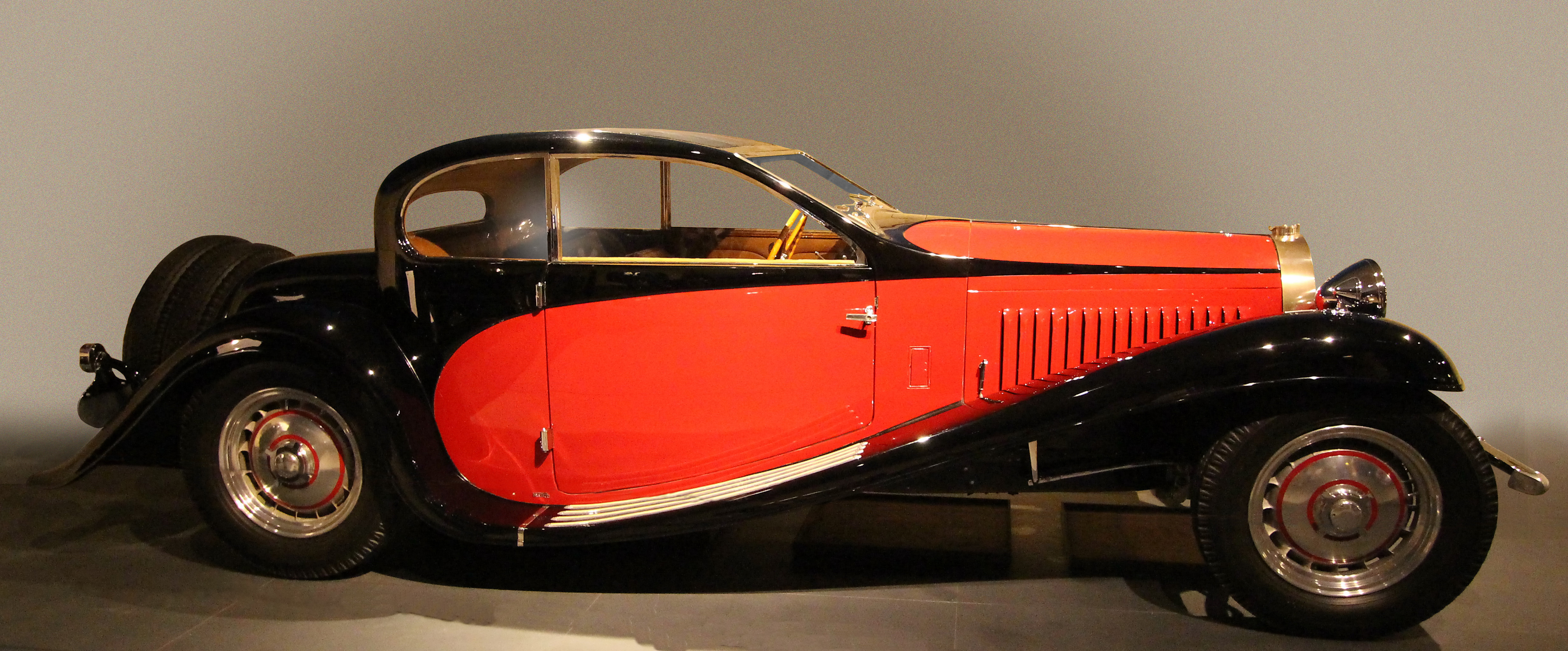
1932 Bugatti Type 50T

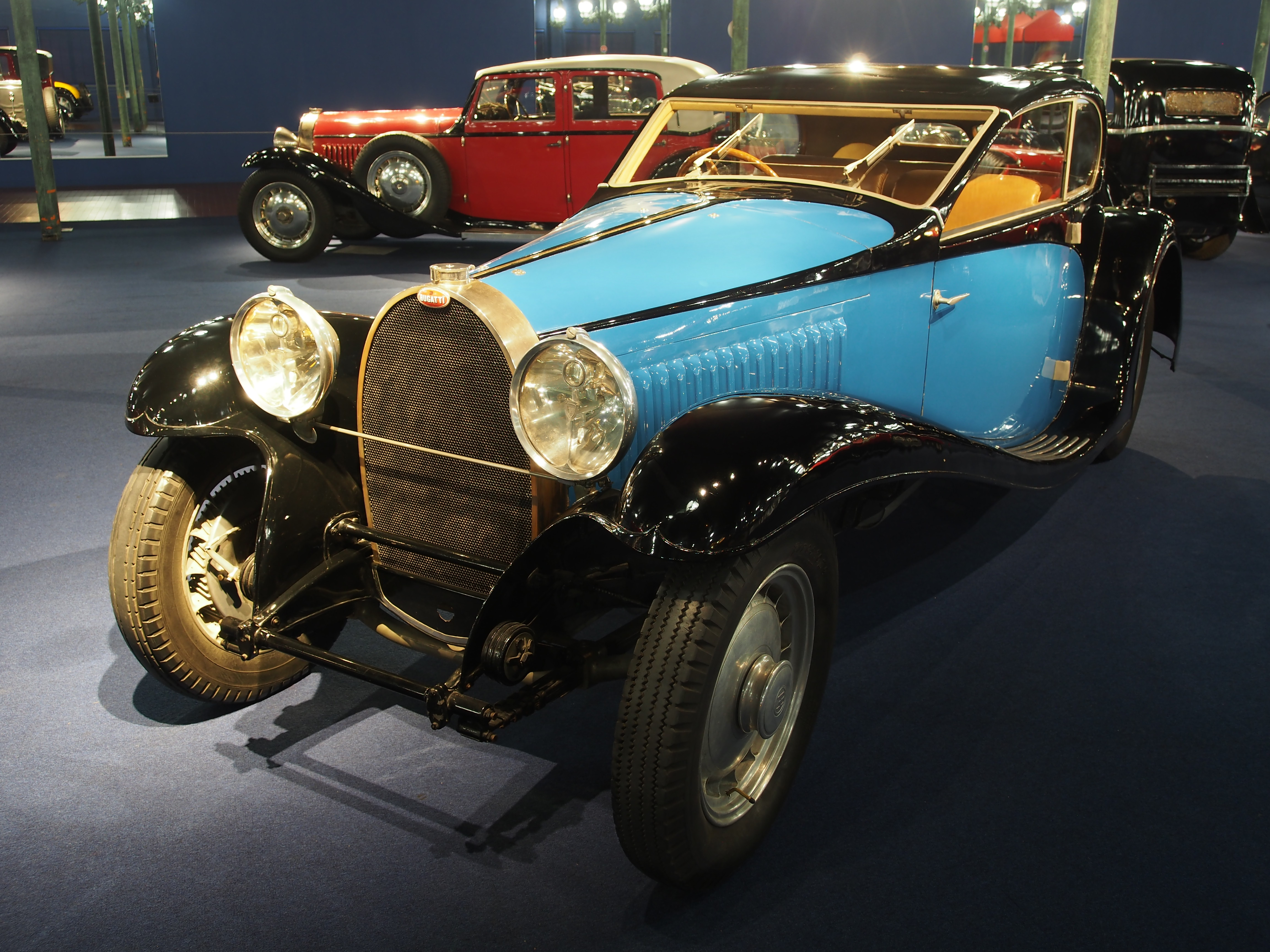
1933 Bugatti Type 46 "Surprofilée" coach (chassis 46-482)

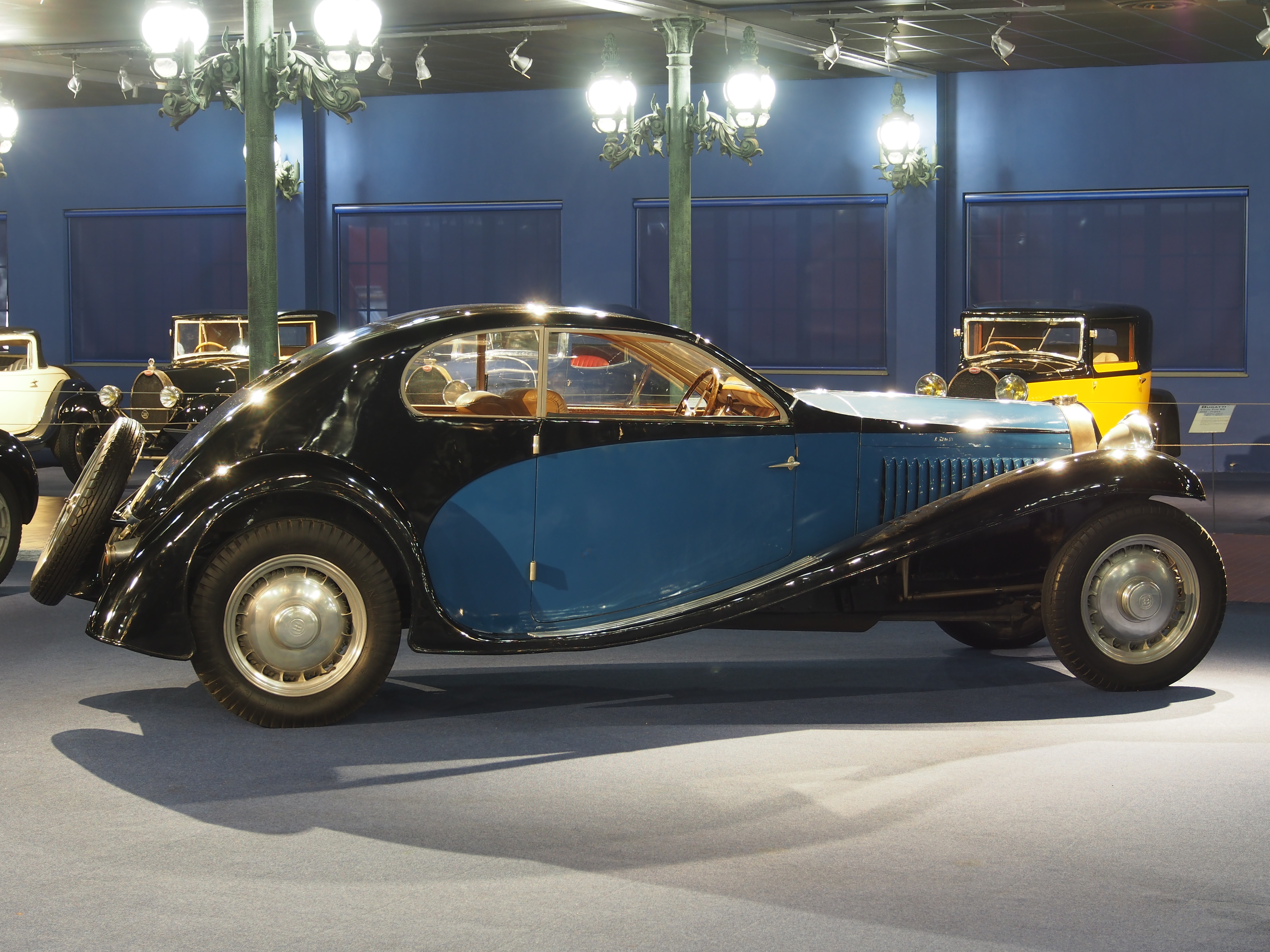
1933 Bugatti Type 46 "Surprofilée" coach (chassis 46-482)

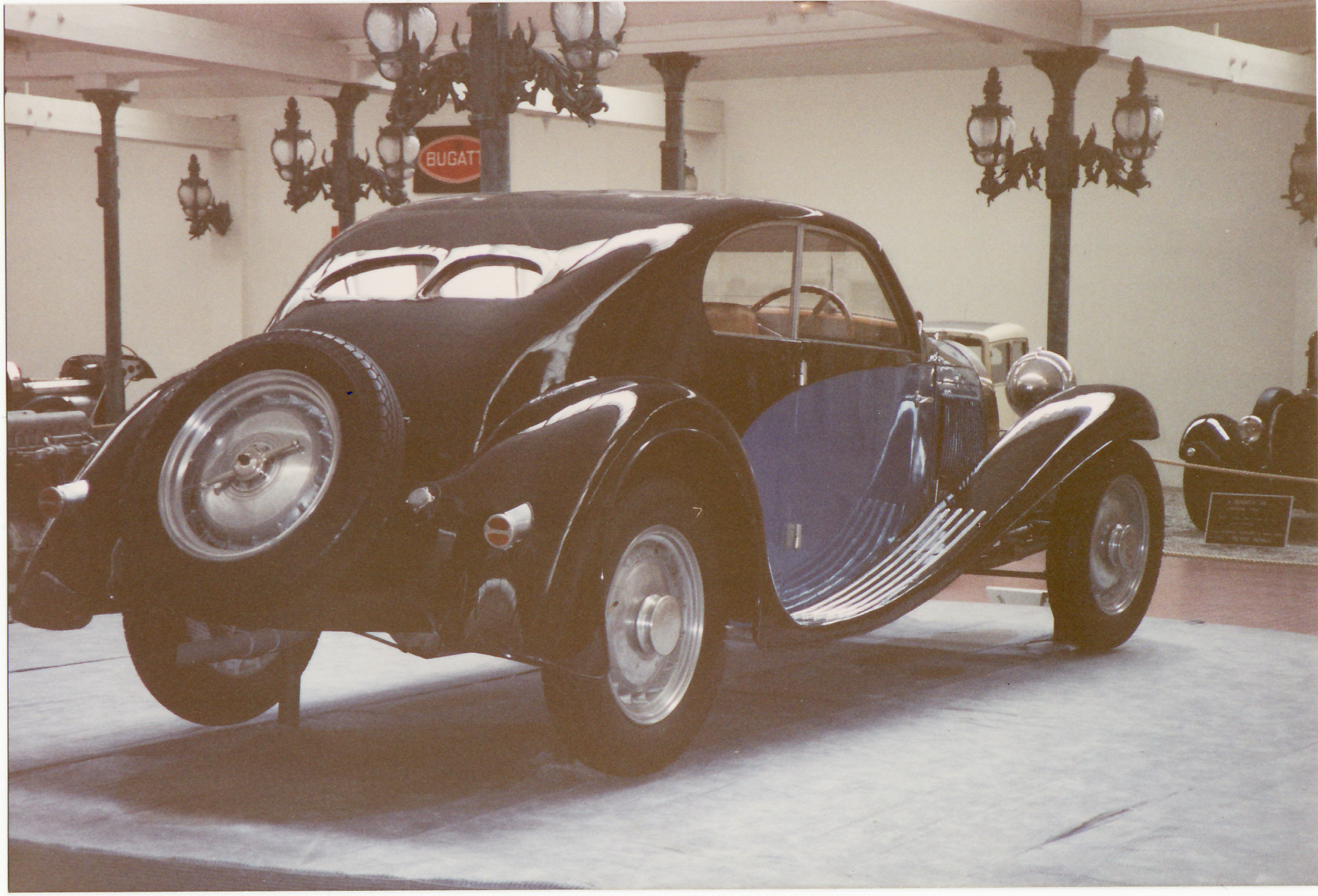
1933 Bugatti Type 46 "Surprofilée" coach (chassis 46-482)

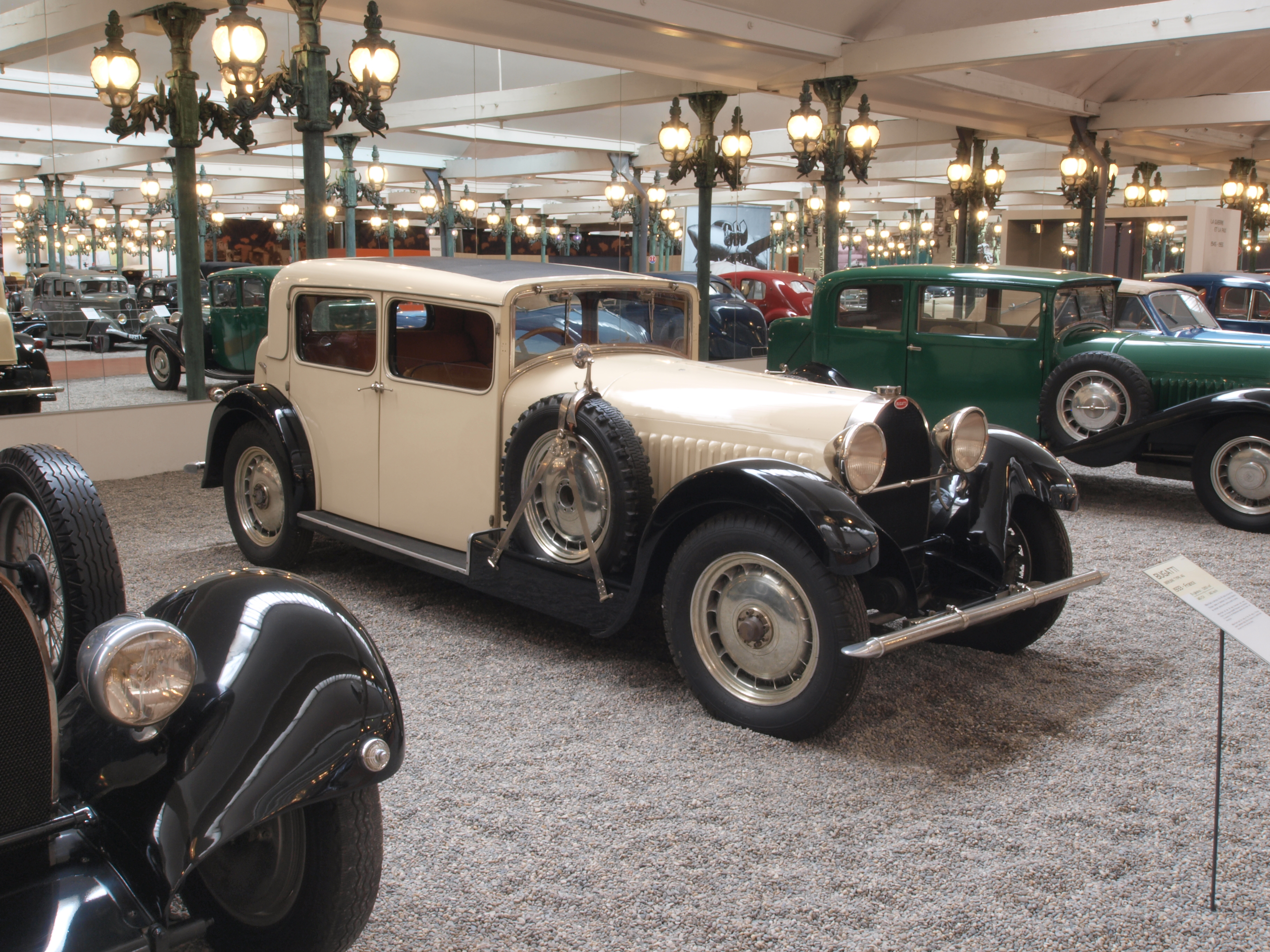
1933 Bugatti Type 46 berline Million & Guiet (chassis 46-523)

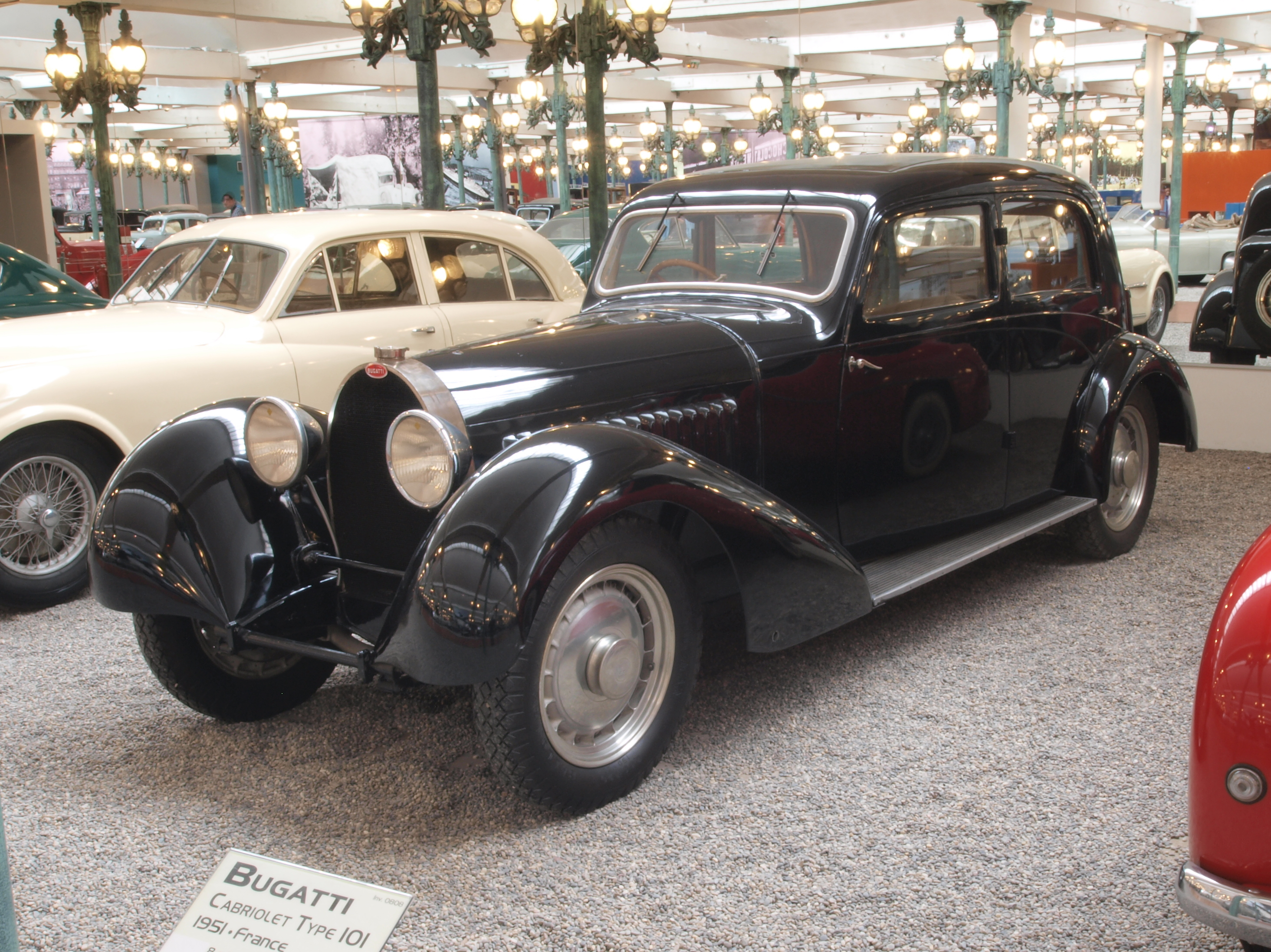
1932 Bugatti Type 46 S berline (chassis 46-560)

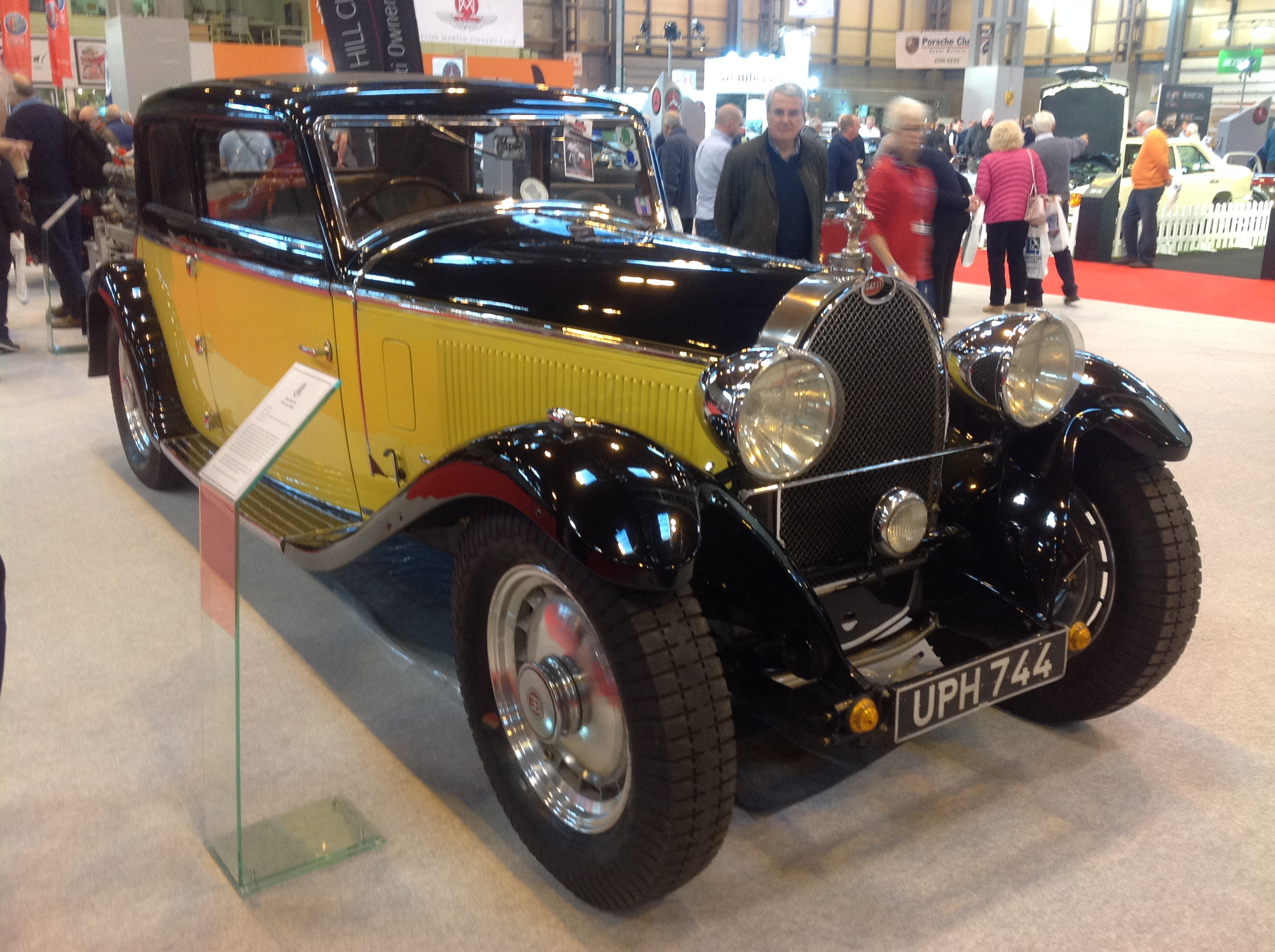
Bugatti type 46 S coach Billeter & Cartier (chassis 46-585)

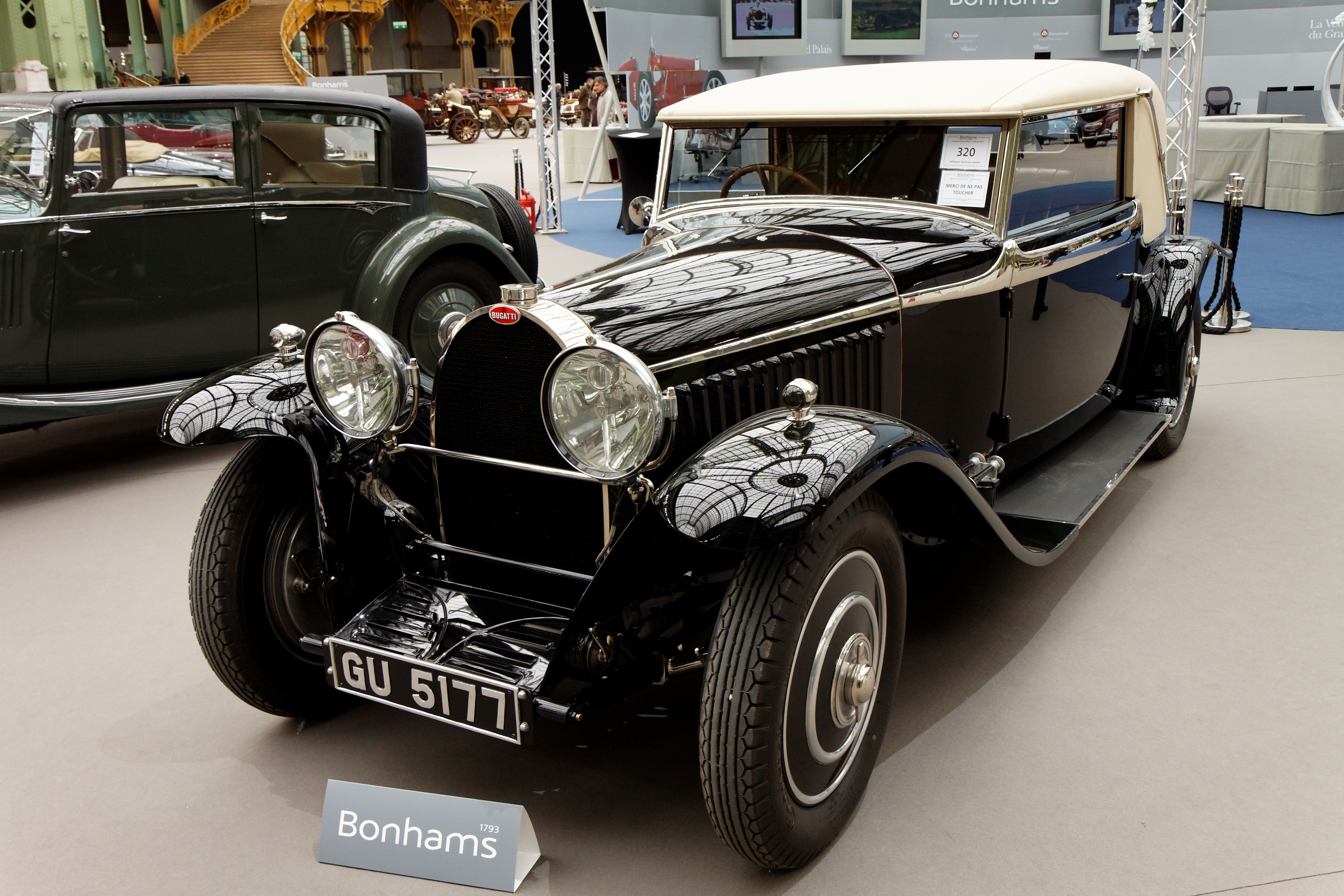
1930 Bugatti Type 46 Veth & Zoon "Faux-Cabriolet" coupe (chassis 46-293)

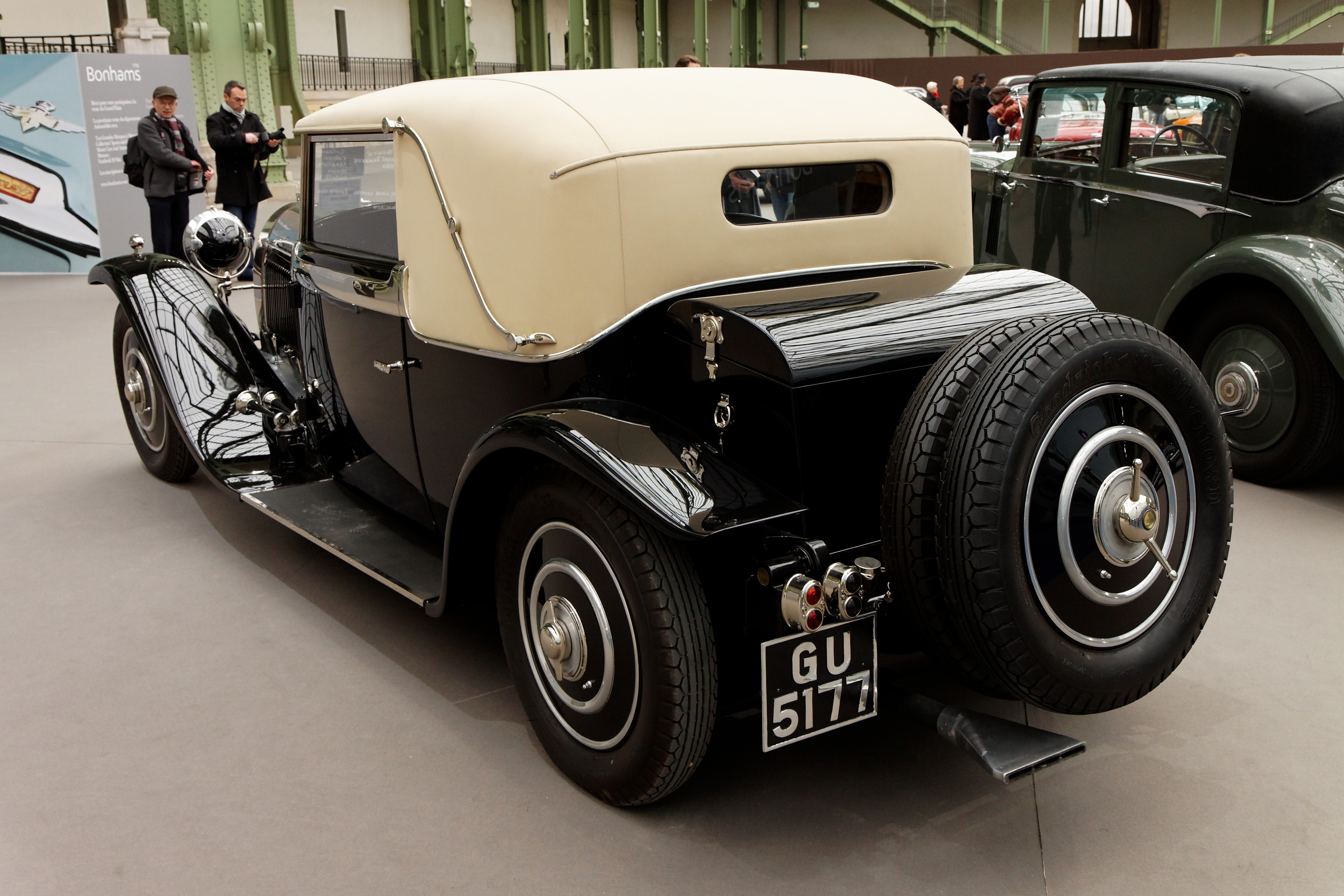
1930 Bugatti Type 46 Veth & Zoon "Faux-Cabriolet" coupe (chassis 46-293)

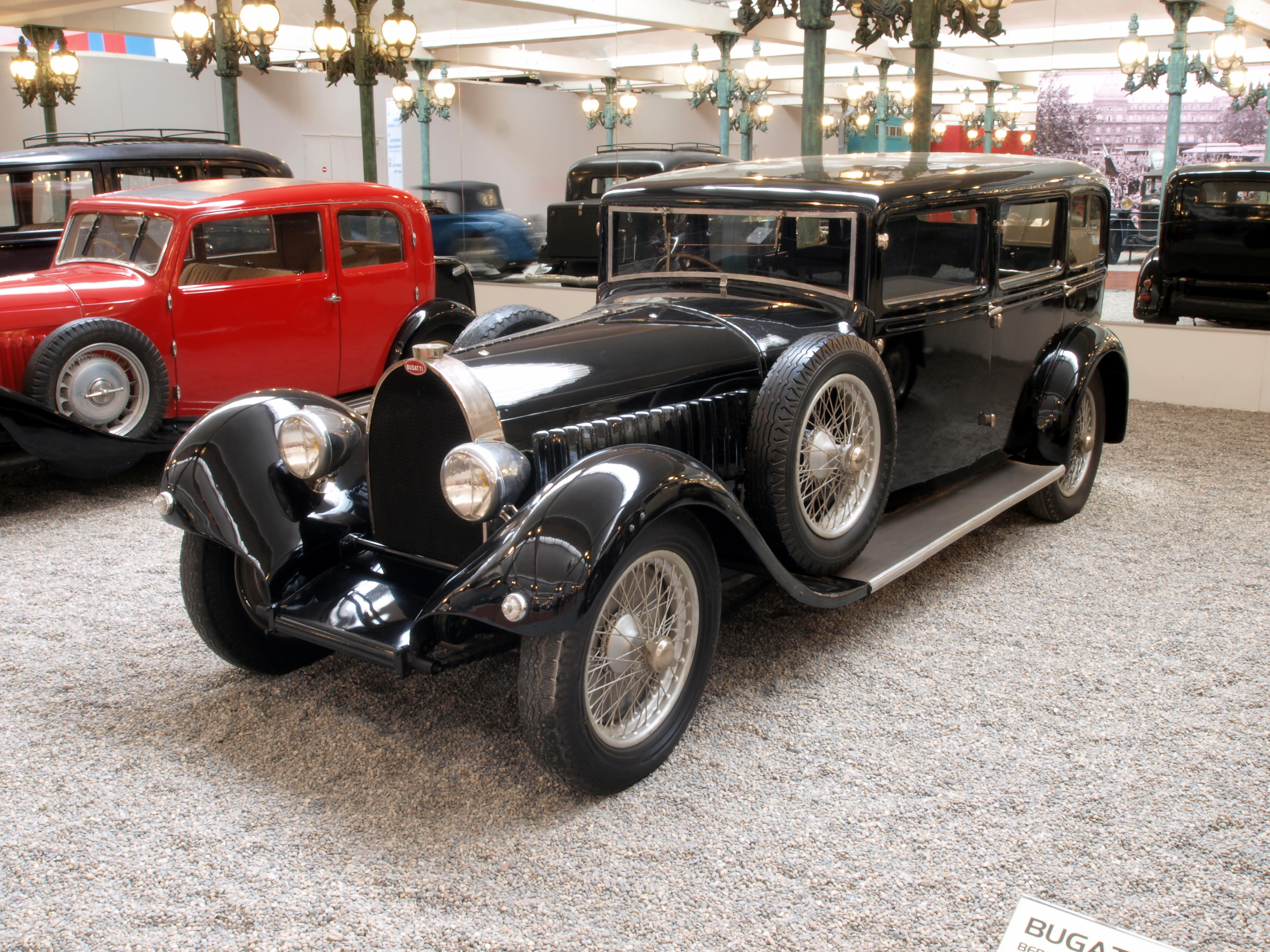
1930 Bugatti Type 46 limousine (chassis 46-188)

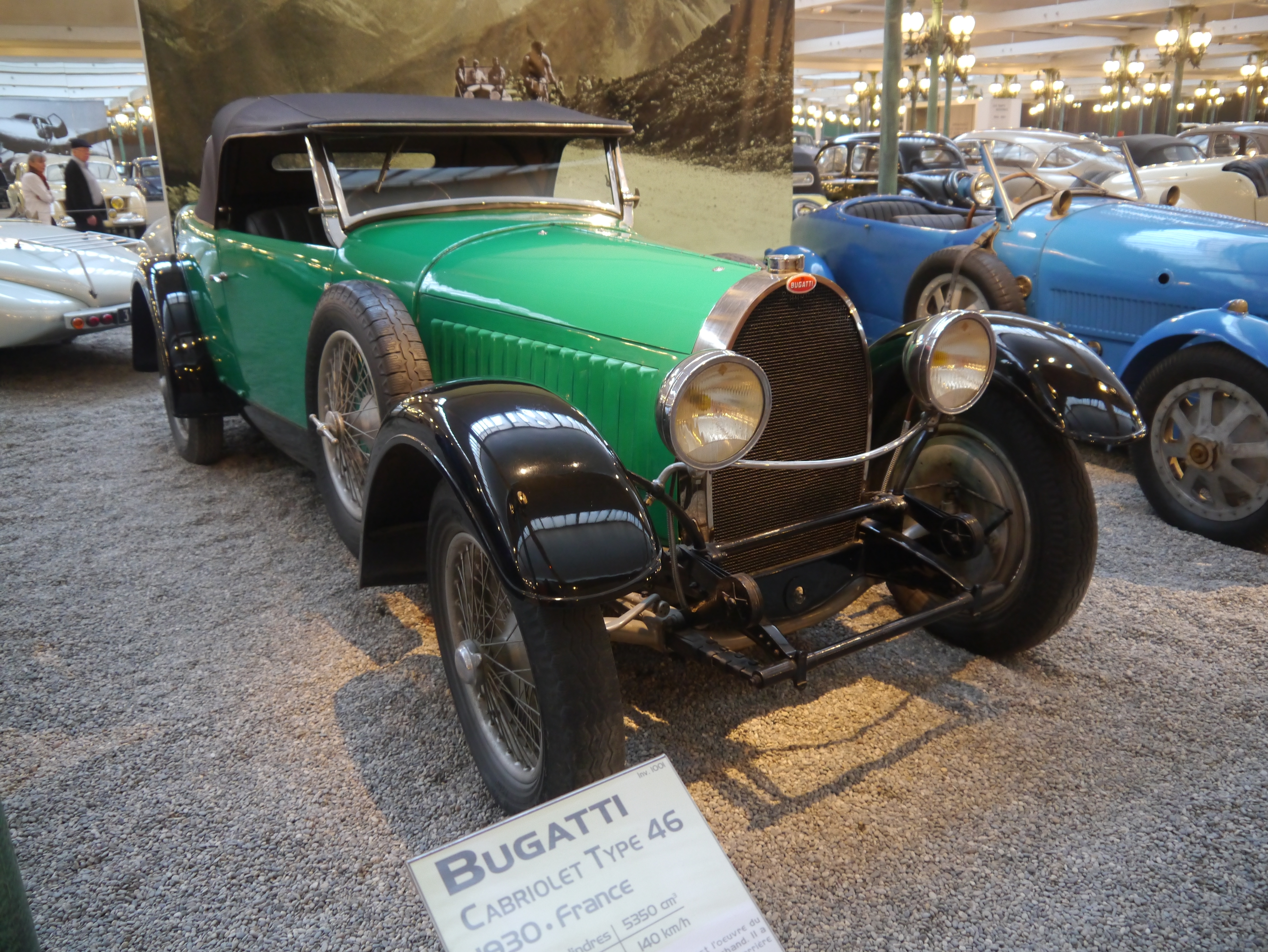
1930 Bugatti Type 46 cabriolet Letourneur et Marchand (chassis 46-125)

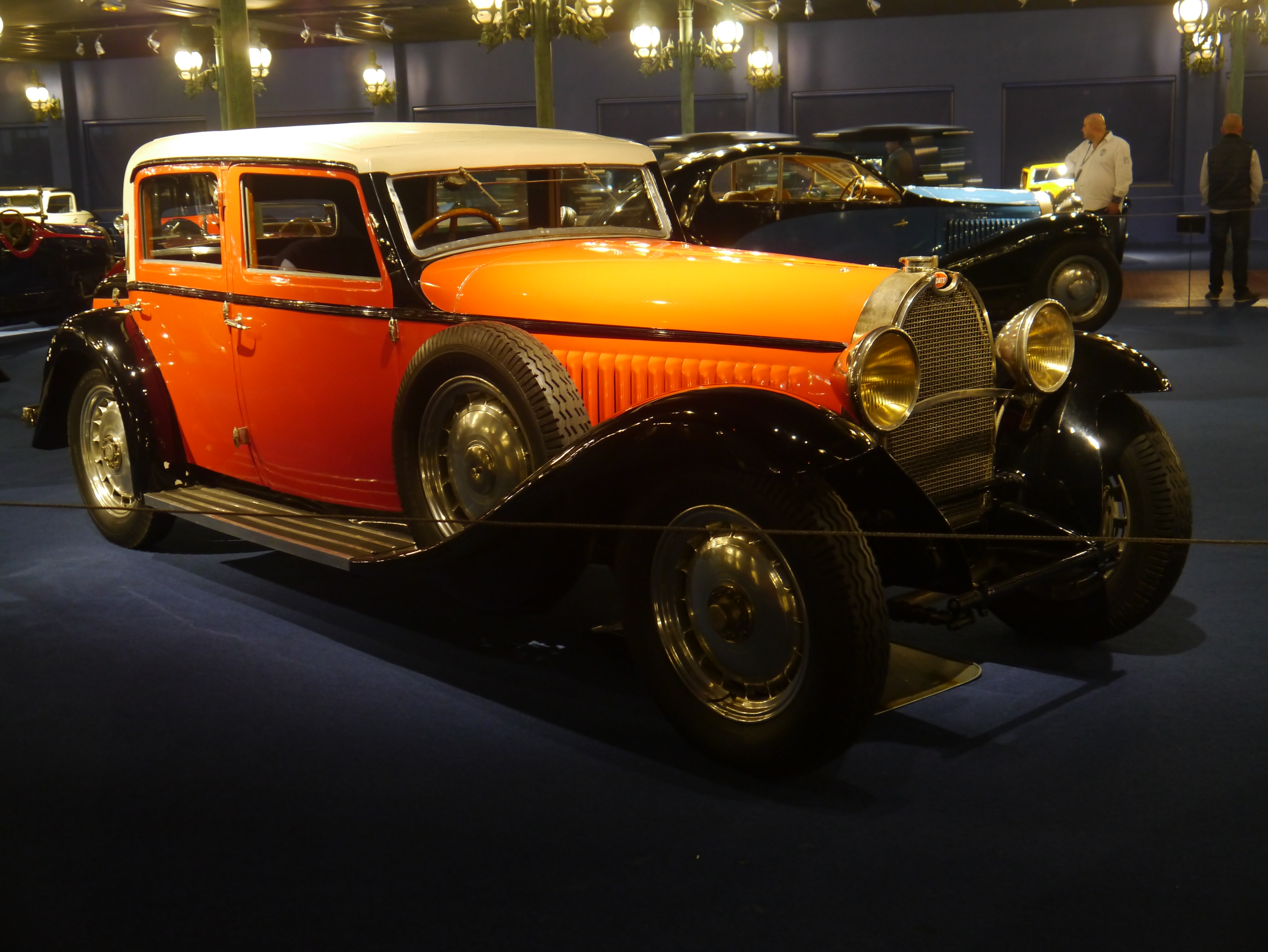
1934 Bugatti Type 46 berline (chassis 46-574)

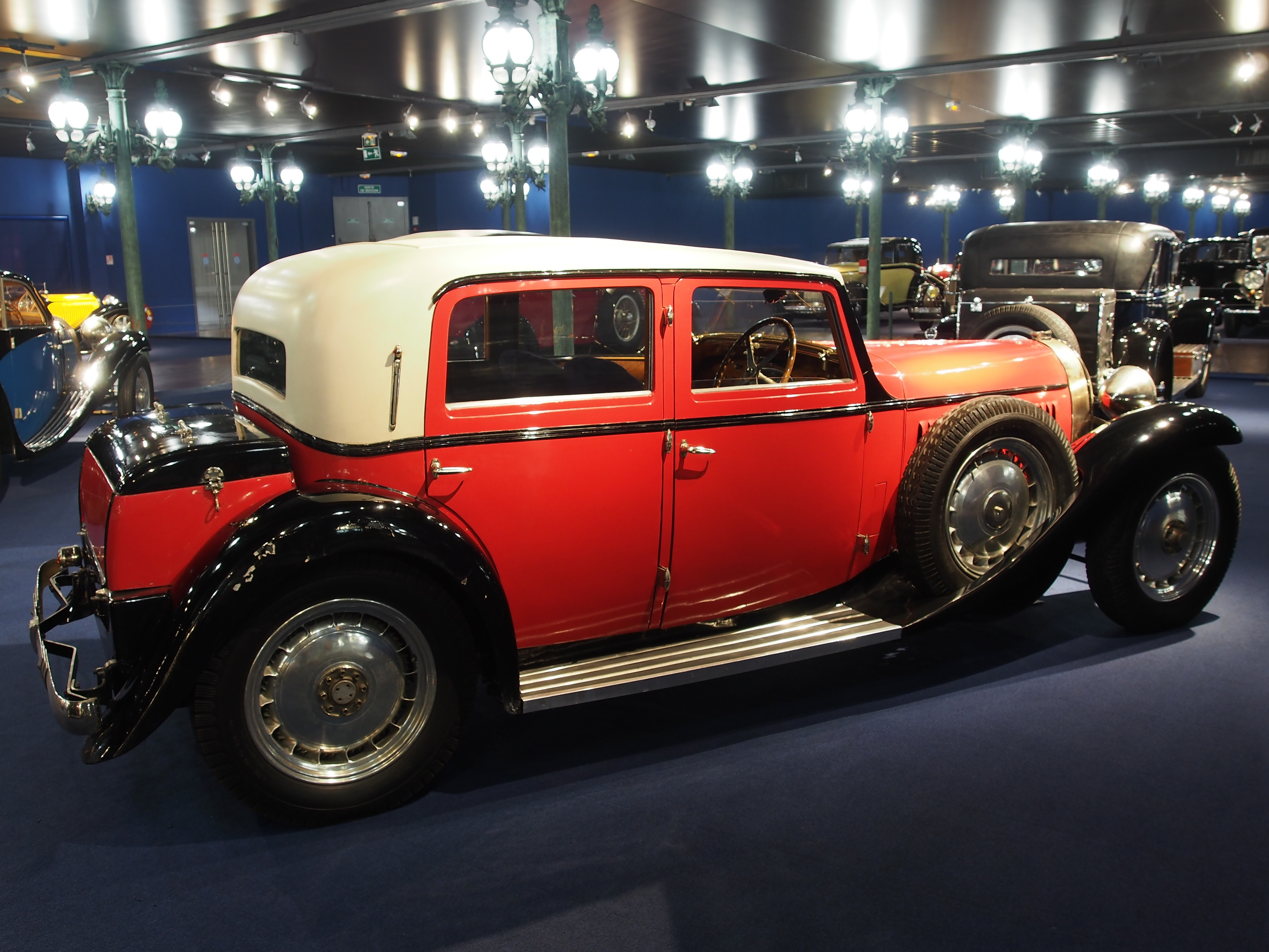
1934 Bugatti Type 46 berline (chassis 46-574)

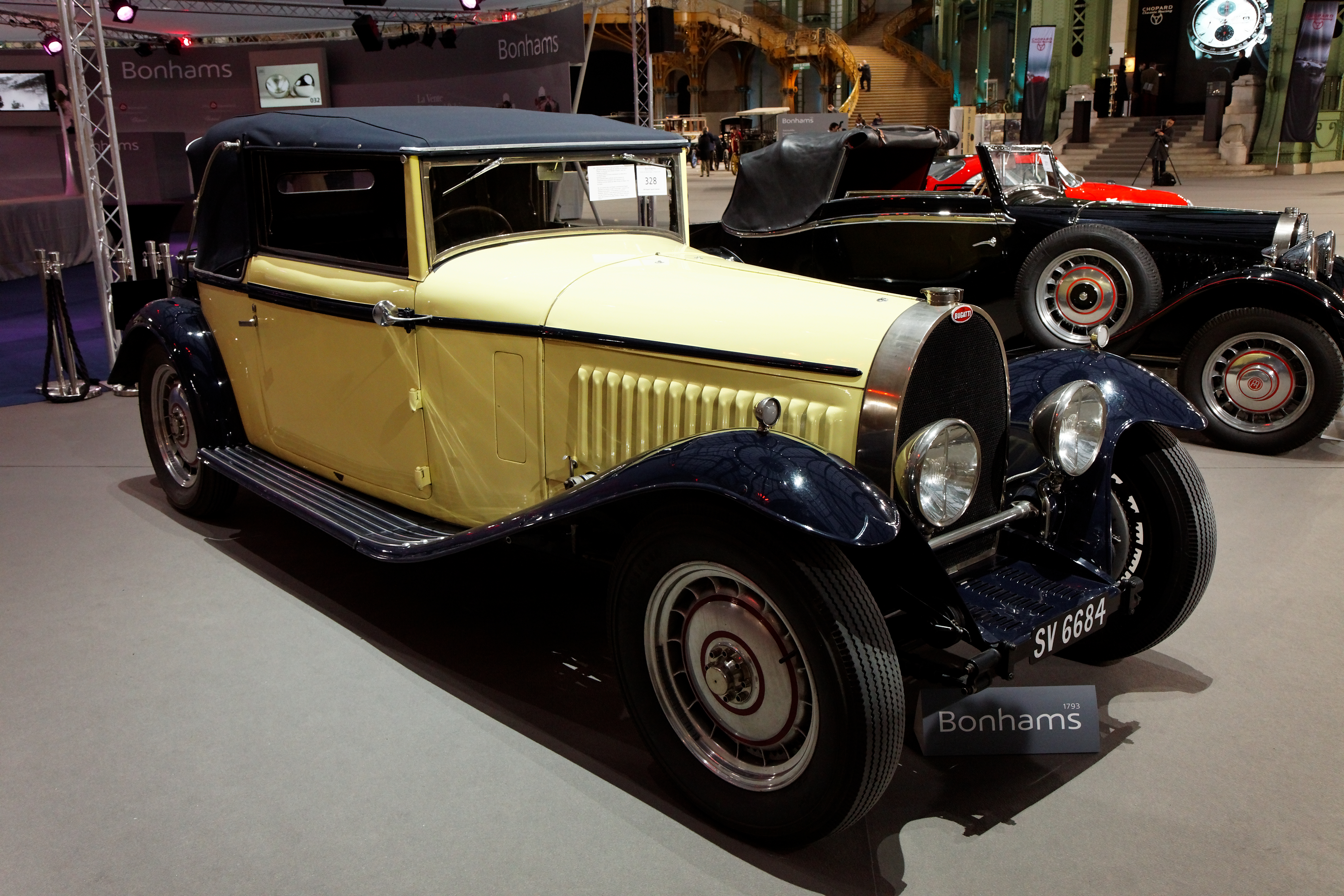
1930 Bugatti Type 46 cabriolet Figoni (chassis 46-331)

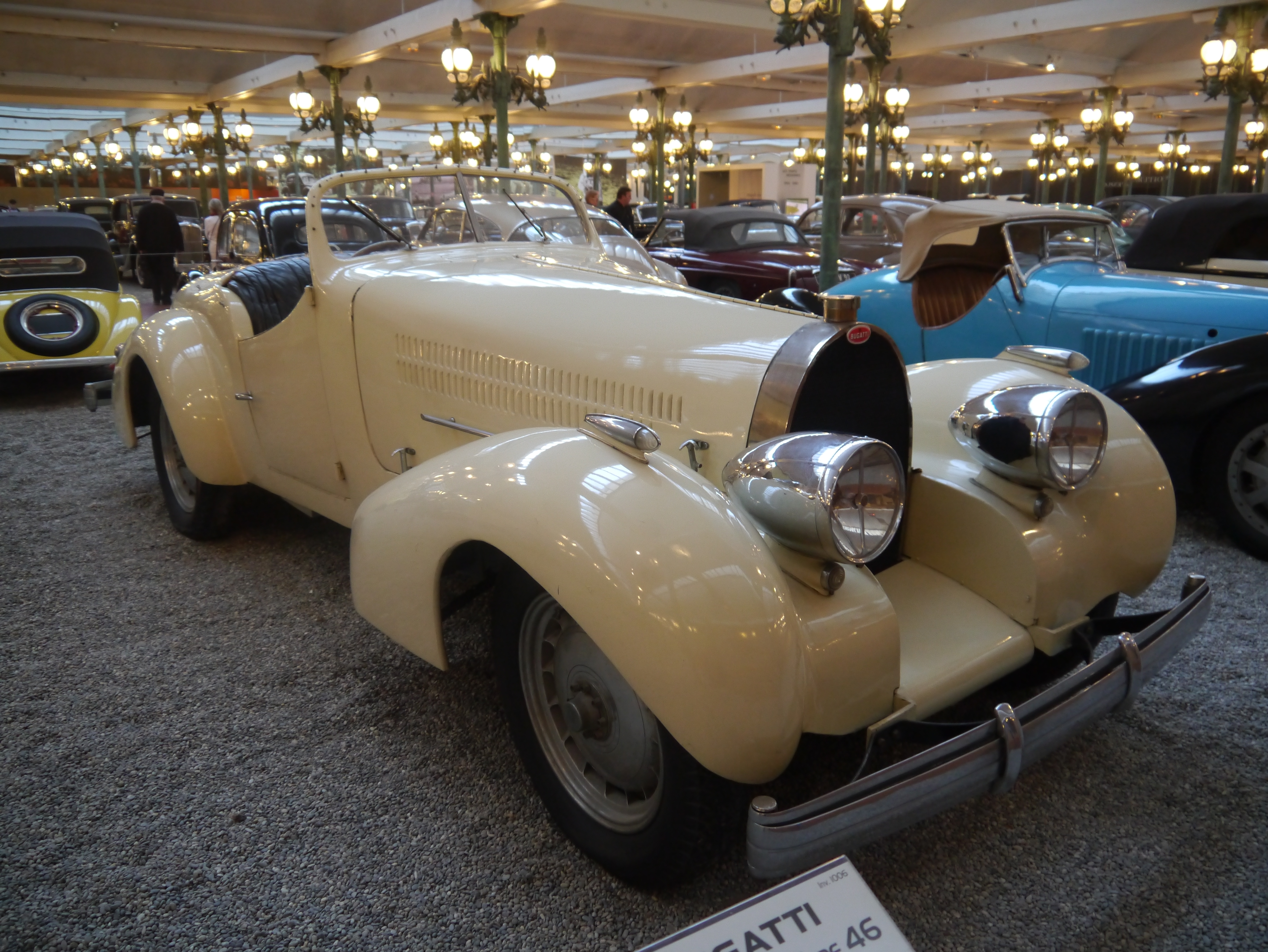
1930 Bugatti Type 46 roadster (chassis 46-287)

== Technical data ==
	Type 46	Type 50	Type 50B	Type 50B III
Engine:	Front mounted 8-cylinder in-line engine
displacement:	5359 cm^{3}	4972 cm^{3}	4741 cm^{3}	2985 cm^{3}
Bore × stroke:	81 × 130 mm	86 × 107 mm	84 × 107 mm	78 × 78 mm
Max power at rpm:	140 hp at 3 500 rpm	225 hp at 4 000 rpm	402 hp at 5 300 rpm	275 hp at 4 500 rpm
Valve control:	1 overhead cam shaft, 3 valves per cylinder, SOHC	2 overhead camshafts, 2 valves per cylinder, DOHC
Compression:		7.5:1
Carburetor:	Smith-Bariquand	2 Zenith
Upload:	Naturally Aspirated	Roots compressor
Gearbox:	4-speed manual
suspension front:	Rigid axle, semi-elliptic leaf springs		Solid axle, semi-elliptic leaf springs
suspension rear:	Live axle, quarter-elliptic leaf springs	Live axle, reversed quarter-elliptic leaf springs
Brakes:	drums, all-round
Chassis & body:	Cast-iron block and head		steel ladder frame
Wheelbase:	310 cm		260 cm
Dry weight:
Top speed:		170 km/h
