= 5T (gang) =

Vietnamese organized crime group

- Founded: Mid 1980s
- Founded by: Arose from Vietnamese Youths who came to Australia with their parents after the fall of Saigon in 1975. Tri Minh Tran was their leader.
- Founding location: Cabramatta, Sydney, New South Wales, Australia
- Years active: 1985–99
- Territory: Cabramatta
- Ethnicity: Vietnamese
- Membership (est.): Exact members unknown
- Criminal activities: drug trafficking, extortion
- Allies: Various street gangs
- Rivals: Various Asian street gangs

5T was a Vietnamese crime gang active in the Cabramatta area of Sydney, Australia in the final two decades of the 20th century.

== The rise of 5T ==
The 5T gang was started by refugees who came to Australia with their parents after the fall of the Republic of Vietnam. The formation of the 5Ts began in the mid-1980s. The term 5T, stands for five Vietnamese words starting with T; 'Tình', 'Tiền', 'Tù', 'Tội' and 'Tử', translating to 'Love, Money, Prison, Punishment, Death'. However, 5T also means 'tuổi trẻ thiếu tình thương' which roughly translates to 'childhood without love.' Gang members apparently were tattooed with the emblem consisting of a straight horizontal line and 5 joined vertical lines with members' first and family names starting with the letter T being the horizontal line on top of the name.

== Disbandment ==
The murder of the leader in 1995 sparked a power struggle within the organization. This was ultimately furthered with the death of the successor. The leader and namesake of the gang, however, was subsequently murdered outside a Western Sydney pub in 1999 shortly after being released from prison, subsequently leading to the eventual demise of the 5T Gang.
