= Class 50 =

Class 50 or 50 class may refer to:

- British Rail Class 50
- DRB Class 50, a German steam locomotive built for the Deutsche Reichsbahn
- New South Wales 50 class locomotive
