= M50 =

M50 or M-50 may refer to:

== Military equipment ==
- M50 joint service general purpose mask, United States military gas mask
- M50 Super Sherman, an Israeli tank
- M50 Reising submachine gun, an American submachine gun
- M50 Ontos, an American tank destroyer
- Madsen M-50, a Danish submachine gun
- Myasishchev M-50, 'Bounder', a Soviet bomber
- Obusier de 155 mm Modèle 50 or M 50, a French howitzer introduced in 1952

== Transportation ==
- M50 (New York City bus), a New York City Bus route in Manhattan
- BMW M50, a 1989 automobile piston engine
- Suzuki Boulevard M50, an 800cc V-twin muscle cruiser by Suzuki Motor Company
- The FAA identifier of Boardman Airport, Oregon, United States

=== Roads ===
- M-50 (Michigan highway), United States
- M50 motorway (Great Britain), in the West Midlands / South West
- M50 motorway (Ireland), a Dublin ring road
- M-50 (Spain), a Madrid ring road
- M50 (Cape Town), a Metropolitan Route in Cape Town, South Africa
- M50 (Pietermaritzburg), a Metropolitan Route in Pietermaritzburg, South Africa

== Other uses ==
- 50 Moganshan Road (M50), Shanghai's contemporary art district
- Messier 50 (M50), an open star cluster in the constellation Monoceros
- M 50, an age group for Masters athletics (athletes aged 35+)
- Canon EOS M50 Camera
- BMW M50 Engine

== See also ==
- Model 50 (disambiguation)
