= T5 engine =

T5 engine is a colloquial term used to described Volvo automobiles badged as having a T5 and refers to the engine associated with the badge.

It may refer to:

- Volvo Modular engine for cars with five-cylinder engines from 1994 to 2016
- Ford EcoBoost engine for cars with four-cylinder engines from 2010 to 2016
- Volvo Engine Architecture for cars with three- and four-cylinder engines since 2014
