= Benz Patent-Motorwagen =

First modern automobile

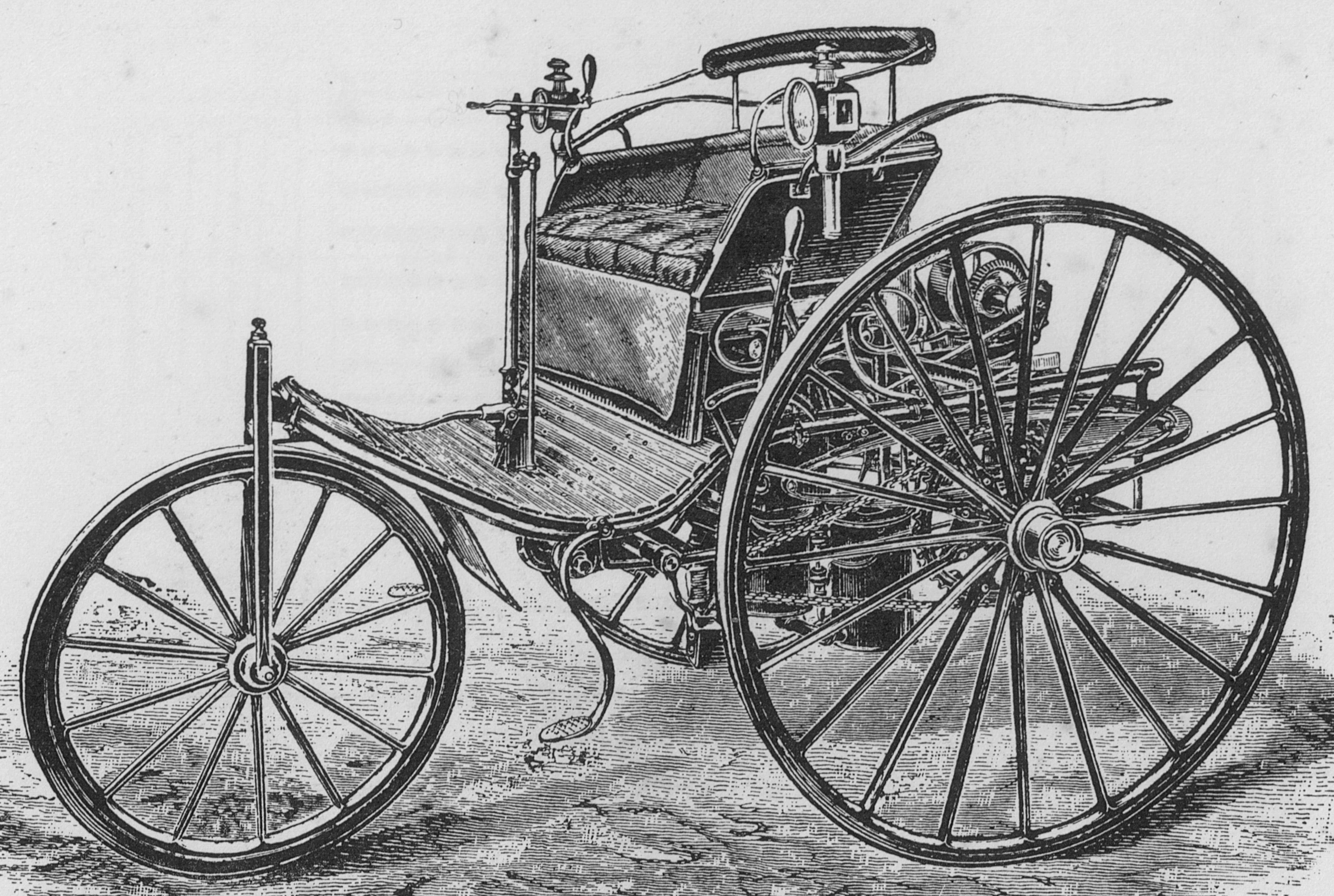
- The first practical motor car: Benz Patent-Motorwagen Nr. 2, 1886

Overview
- Manufacturer: Benz & Cie. Rheinische Gasmotorenfabrik (subsumed within Mercedes-Benz)
- Production: 1886–1893

Body and chassis
- Layout: Rear Engine, RWD

Powertrain
- Engine: 954 cc (58.2 cu in; 1.0 L) single cylinder engine (Ligroin fuel)
- Power output: 0.68 PS (0.50 kW; 2/3 bhp) @ 400 rpm 0.082 kg⋅m (4/5 N⋅m; 0.59 lb⋅ft)
- Transmission: Single-speed belt drive to counter shaft with differential; reduction gearbox for second (low) gear; then separate chain drives to each rear wheel

Dimensions
- Wheelbase: 1,450 mm (57.1 in)
- Length: 2,700 mm (106.3 in)
- Width: 1,400 mm (55.1 in)
- Height: 1,450 mm (57.1 in)
- Curb weight: 340 kg (750 lb)

Chronology
- Successor: Benz Velo

The Benz Patent-Motorwagen ("patent motorcar") was the world's first practical production automobile, built by Benz & Cie between 1885 and 1893. Featuring three wheels, a single-cylinder four-stroke engine and belt-drive, Benz & Cie used the designation "Patent-Motorwagen" for their four-wheel cars until c.1900, but these are known today by their other names, such as Viktoria and Velo. All these cars used the same layout and belt-drive technology for which Benz received patent number DRP37435 in 1886, hence the designation.

The original Patent-Motorwagen was developed over the period 1884 – 1887 by the German engineer Carl Benz and is widely regarded as the first practical automobile. (Note: Before Karl Benz patented his Motorwagen in January 1886, several inventors were working on automobiles powered by steam engines. In 1769, Nicolas-Joseph Cugnot built the first steam-propelled vehicle. During the 1870s, Bollée created several steam vehicles which could carry passengers for road trips. However, steam cars suffered from several practical limitations, including very long startup times, complex operation, often needing a crew (including a stoker), considerable weight, and the risk of boiler explosions. Various authors have therefore characterized steam cars as "distinctly uncommercial", "unsafe" and "difficult to manage", and have explained why they never became a practical choice for everyday transportation. According to automotive historian G. N. Georgano, the stationary Otto engine helped make the invention of the Benz Motorwagen possible, which he labelled as "the first motorcar" due to its commercial production. The company Mercedes-Benz also acknowledge there were forerunners to the Motorwagen, but also state that Benz was the first to develop "a 'horseless carriage' into a product for everyday use, which he then brought to market and as a result made his idea useful for the entire world".)

The engine's output was stabilised by a flywheel. In the first vehicles this was horizontal and the vehicles had a single belt-drive. Later vehicles had a vertical flywheel and two belt-drives. Each belt-drive gave a single transmission ratio; from 1886 the single-belt-drive vehicles also had a reduction gearbox which provided a second transmission ratio.

Production ceased after Benz had perfected two-wheel steering and began manufacturing four-wheel models from late 1892. Around 1895 the Sales Manager at Benz & Cie sought to recreate the form which the original vehicle took in early 1886 before it was given a new body. The rebuilt vehicle was given to the Deutsches Museum in 1906; replicas of it have been produced from the mid-twentieth century.

== Sources ==
The development of the Benz Patent-Motorwagen is complicated and sources are often contradictory.

There appears to be only one surviving vehicle in near-original condition: a Model 2 in the Science Museum in London. (Note: Not only is this the only surviving Model 2, it is also the only Model 2 of which photographs exist. The photograph in Benz's Lebensfahrt and those in Mercedes-Benz's archives were taken by the Science Museum after it acquired the vehicle in 1913. It was restored in the late 1950s when its appearance was changed to match that in the 1888 Munich engraving. Its front was damaged in the 1957 London to Brighton run and rebuilt.) There is a Model 3 in the Technical Museum in Vienna, but it was rebuilt in 1898 to have four wheels. The vehicle in the Deutsches Museum in Munich was rebuilt c.1895 around the cylinder of the original vehicle. It gives something of the flavour of Nr. 1, Benz's vehicle of 1885, rather than being a replica.

The principal sources used here (apart from the original vehicles and photographs of them) are:

- technical histories, especially two early ones: William Worby Beaumont's Motor Vehicles and Motors (1900) and Benz's Lebensfahrt (1925). The latter is both a memoir by Benz and a technical history written (in Benz's voice) mainly by his sons-in-law and a Professor Volk;
- early images, notably engravings of Nr. 2, a newspaper illustration of Carl and Bertha Benz driving a Model 2 in Munich in 1888 and photographs and engravings from before 1900 of another Model 2, a Model 3 and the rebuilt original vehicle;
- documents, notably patents DRP37435, CH960A and CH970A and contemporary newspaper reports.

The identification of vehicles in images in the Mercedes-Benz Public Archive differs from those given here. A full analysis of images in the Public Archive which show original vehicles (including the rebuilt original vehicle in the Deutsches Museum but not replicas of it) is given at the end of this article.

== Chronology and Nomenclature ==
This article adopts the following nomenclature:

- Nr. 1, Nr. 2 and Nr. 3 are used for what appear to have been the three stages of development between 1884 and 1887:
  - Nr. 1: the motorised velocipede developed between 1884 and early1886;
  - Nr. 2: the motorised Stanhope gig of 1886 which Benz is driving in this photograph;
  - Nr. 3: a motorised calèche which was developed during 1887 into the prototype of Model 2;
- Model 2 and Model 3 are used for production versions:
  - Model 2: the vehicle which appears as Fig. 27 of Benz's Lebensfahrt; with the caption "My first production car from 1888"
  - Model 3: the rebodied version as in a photograph of Benz driving it outside the works with Josef Brecht beside him.

While Model 3's external form remained unchanged during its production, its engine and transmission were transformed around 1890 when a second belt-system was added and the flywheel was switched from horizontal to vertical.

The vehicle constructed in 1895 is referred to as the "1895 rebuild of Nr. 1" or "1895 rebuild".

With this nomenclature, the table below shows when various versions of Patent-Motorwagen are believed to have been built and their characteristics. An "x" indicates strong likelihood that production took place in that year; a "?" the possibility of production. To keep things simple, whole years are used. The exact dates of the transitions from one version of the original vehicle to the next are not known: that from Nr. 1 to Nr. 2 probably took place over the early months of 1886.

	Development		Model 2	Model 3		Viktoria	Velo
	Development		Model 2	Model 3		Vis-à-vis	Velo
Wheels	3					4	
Flywheel	Horizontal				Vertical		
Belts + Gears	1 + 0	1 + 1	1 + 1	1 + 1	2 + 0	2 + 0	
1884	Nr. 1						
1885	Nr. 1						
1886		Nr. 2					
1887		Nr. 3	x				
1888			x	x			
1889			x	?			
1890			?	?	?		
1891					x		
1892					x	x	
1893					x	x	
1894					?	x	x
1895	Rebuild					x	x
1896 onwards						x	x

This nomenclature differs from that which Mercedes-Benz use in their records. They use Nr.1 and Model 1 interchangeably for the motorised velocipede and the rebuild of 1895 and give the dates 1885 – 1886 for each of them. All the other 3-wheelers are identified as Model 3, with the dates 1886 – 1894.

No images or drawings of Mercedes-Benz's Model 2 are available, but in Mercedes-Benz Personenwagen 1886-1945, Werner Oswald states that it consisted of a single development vehicle which had small full-elliptical springs each side of the front wheel and that this vehicle was subsequently converted to four wheels.

== Motorwagen Nr. 1 ==
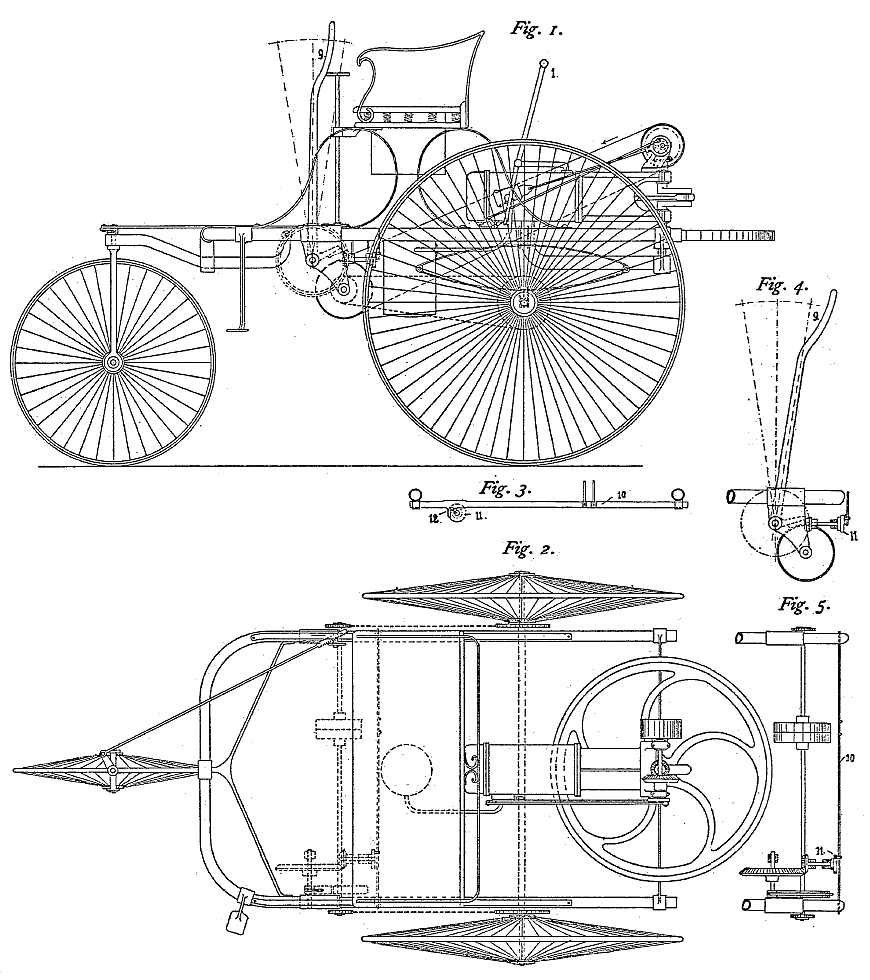
Side and top views from patent DRP37435 of Benz Motorwagen Nr. 1

Benz began work on his vehicle in 1884 but it was in Spring 1885 that he got his prototype moving under its own power for the first time. He worked continually to improve his vehicle. Initially it would only run for a short distance and was driven only in the factory grounds. In autumn 1885 he announced a public demonstration outside the works. People came, but the engine proved difficult to start. When it finally started, Benz wasn't paying attention and crashed it into a wall.

Thereafter, Benz tested it on unfrequented roads and at night, gradually increasing how far it went before it broke down. One curious feature of Nr. 1 was that the steering and drive/brake controls, both hand levers, were at opposite edges of the vehicle, more than 1m apart. The apparently bizarre location of the steering at the right edge may have been motivated by the ease with which the vehicle could be steered when pushing it back to the works and in the expectation that (as often happened) Benz would be accompanied on his nightly forays.

By the end of 1885 Benz was sufficiently confident in his vehicle to prepare a patent application. A further factor was progress in litigation which challenged Nicolaus Otto's patent for his four-stroke engine. (Note: Otto had been granted a patent in 1876 on his engine, which ran until 1891. The success of his engine led others who wished to develop and manufacture their own versions to challenge the patent on the grounds of prior art. In 1886 the German patent office nullified several aspects of Otto's patent because in 1862 the Frenchman Alphonse Beau de Rochas had been granted a patent for a four-cycle engine, although he had never built one.) Benz's patent application was filed on 29 January 1886. and granted on 2 November 1886 (Note: The date of the patent is displayed as a stamp at the top right of the first page; there is a link to an image of it in the Sources section.) (if a patent is granted, the date of the patent is the filing date). This first vehicle is known as Patent-Motorwagen Nr. 1.

As Benz was developing Nr. 1 continuously, by the time patent DRP37435 was submitted, the vehicle was no longer that depicted. Around the end of 1885 or in early 1886, work began to build a new body with wooden wheels and heavier-duty transmission; meanwhile, testing and incremental development of Nr. 1 continued (Note: That there was a period in which further testing and development of Nr. 1 overlapped with building Nr. 2 is inferred from the form which the 1895 rebuild took ‒ it is a substantial advance on patent DRP37435 ‒ and the few months between Benz's preparation of the patent drawings and his having a vehicle in Spring 1886 which was sufficiently presentable to drive into central Mannheim.). At some point Nr. 1 was scrapped and the engine and some other parts were transferred into the new vehicle: Nr. 2, the motorised Stanhope gig. Exactly when this happened is not known, nor is the final form of Nr. 1. In 1895 the Sales Manager sought to recreate the final form of Nr. 1, incorporating surviving parts from the original vehicle. The nature of the rebuilt vehicle and the final form of Nr. 1 are discussed in the section Rebuild of Patent-Motorwagen Nr. 1.

== Motorwagen Nr. 2 ==
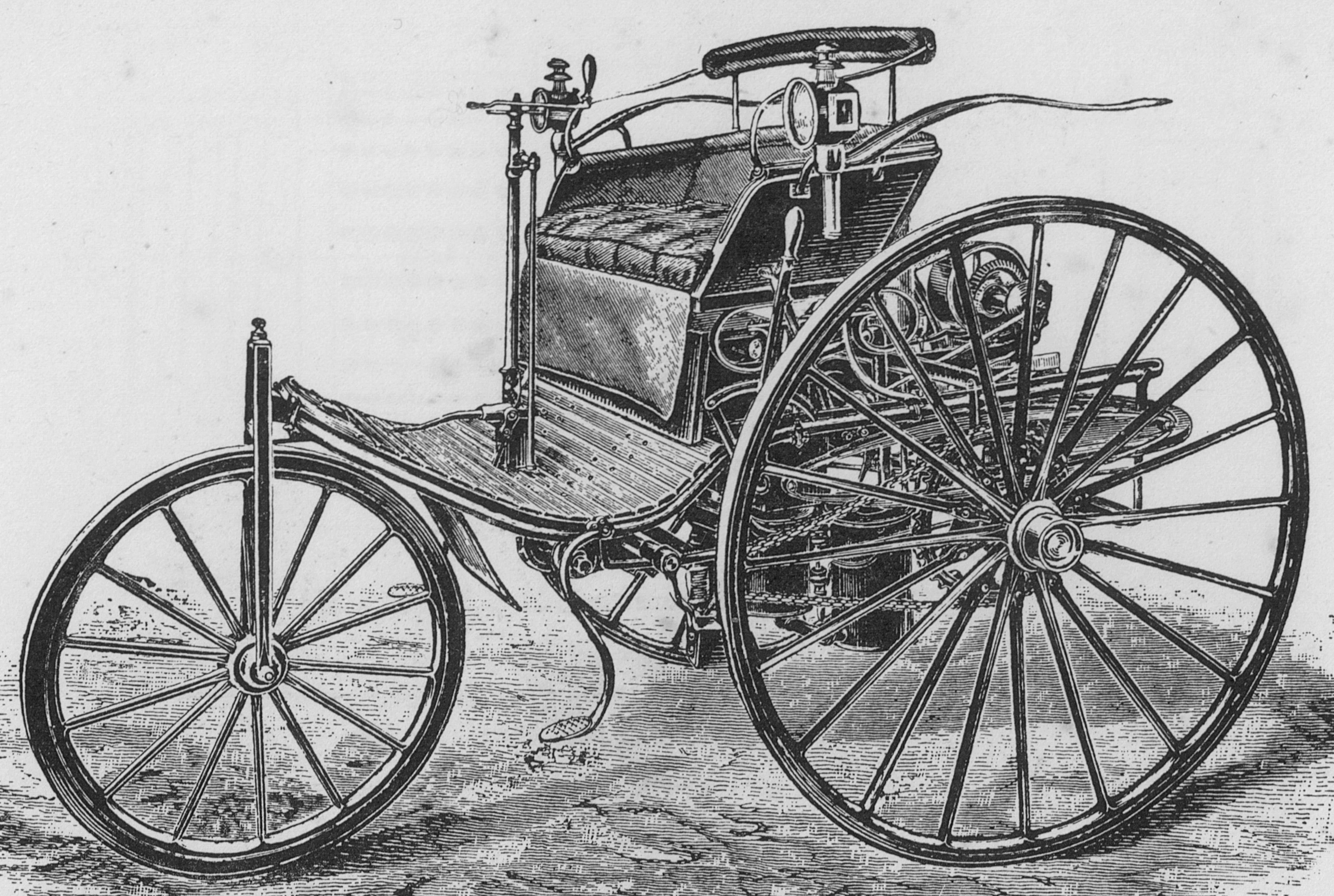
Benz Patent-Motorwagen Nr. 2, 1886

Benz Patent-Motorwagen Model 2 without the rear box, Science Museum, London, c. 1920

Carl Benz supplied the engraving here to William Worby Beaumont, who used it in his book Motor Vehicles and Motors (1900) with the caption "Benz second motor tricycle carriage // Made in 1886, and ran at 10 miles an hour maximum".

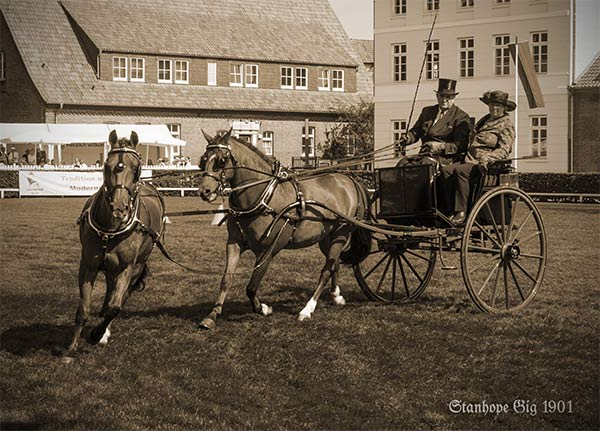
Stanhope gig of 1900

The engraving shows a vehicle which looks like a motorised Stanhope gig. Its rear half appears almost identical to that of the Patent-Motorwagen in the Science Museum in London (with the rear box removed). It has:

- the same type of seat and controls: hand levers on stalks in the middle and a lever outside the frame tube on the left;
- the same machinery visible behind the seat: bevel gears driving a broad pulley; a vertical crankshaft with a horizontal flywheel at its base, barely projecting behind the rear wheel.
- two vertical cylinders (silencer (Note: Although this cylinder behaved as a silencer, its primary purpose appears to have been to cool the exhaust which passed through it so that it could be used to heat the fuel in the carburettor. Most of the exhaust was vented direct through holes in a ceramic block.) and carburettor) to the left of the sprocket of the rear wheel.

These similarities are far greater than those between it and Nr. 1. But it was not a completely new vehicle: the efforts in 1895 to recover parts of the original vehicle from what had been salvaged in 1887 imply that the cylinder from Nr. 1 was reused in Nr. 2.

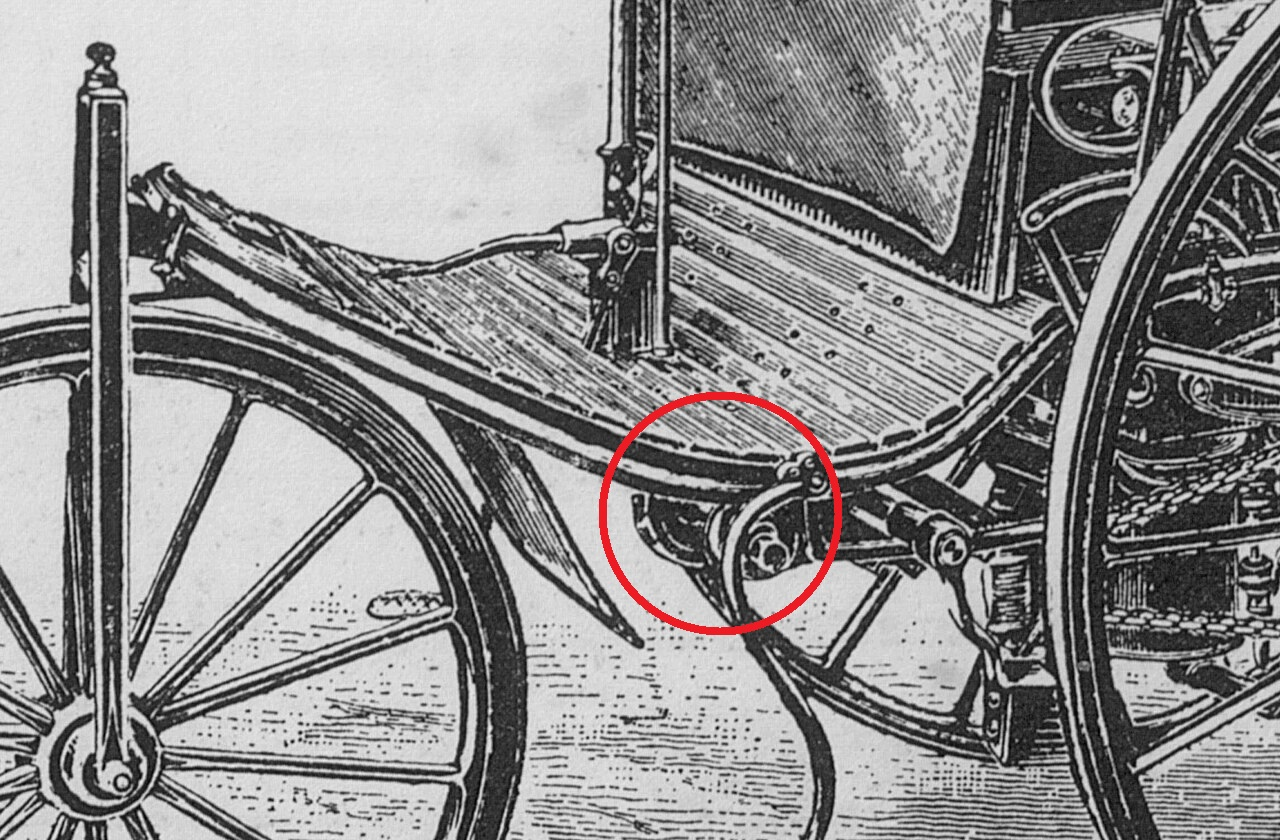
Reduction Gearbox on Nr. 2 (for details see Fig V of patent CH960A)

Among the changes from Nr. 1 were the introduction of a reduction gearbox to provide a second, low gear and brakes on the wheels (instead of a band brake on the counter-shaft). With the changes came an inevitable increase in weight, perhaps from 250 kg to 350 kg. It seems likely that to meet this, the stroke of the engine was increased from 9 cm to 15 cm. Details of the transmission and the controls appear in the drawings of patent CH960A:

- Fig III: side view of controls and counter-shaft
- Figs IV and V: section and plan of transmission at counter-shaft

On 4 June 1886 a report appeared in the Neue Badische Landeszeitung which describes a motorised tricycle, including that

In front of [the seat] are the steering and brake levers. By means of another lever, the vehicle is set in motion or stopped at will, by directing the belt, which transmits the motive power of the engine to the wheels, onto the loose or fixed pulley.

This describes the levers in Model 2 and is mostly correct about what they did (the hand lever beneath the steering controlled the clutch which engaged low gear).

Another report appeared in the Neue Badische Landeszeitung of 3 July 1886. Mercedes-Benz's Chronicle 1883 – 1900 records this as First public outing of Carl Benz with a heavily retouched photograph of Carl Benz driving Nr. 2 with Max Rose, director of Benz & Cie, beside him. (Note: The image appears as Plate 4B of Nixon's The Invention of the Automobile (1936). All the plates in the book from before 1900 have similar heavy retouching of the vehicles. In this instance, the complexity of the machinery has defeated the artist. Working from the same original, the engraver of Mercedes-Benz Archive Number 22584 did much better.)

The combination of Benz's statement to Worby Beaumont that the engraving is of his second motor tricycle with the detail about the levers in front of the seat and the photograph of Benz driving Nr. 2 with Max Rose beside him combine to establish that:

- the engraving shows the vehicle which Benz drove around Mannheim in early summer 1886;
- it was Benz's second type of car, hence Patent-Motorwagen Nr. 2;
- Patent-Motorwagen Nr. 2 was the first practical car, not Patent-Motorwagen Nr. 1.

== Motorwagen Nr. 3 ==
In the records of Benz & Cie, there is a Patent-Motorwagen Nr. 3. Benz & Cie used numbers for individual vehicles and Models or Types for designs.

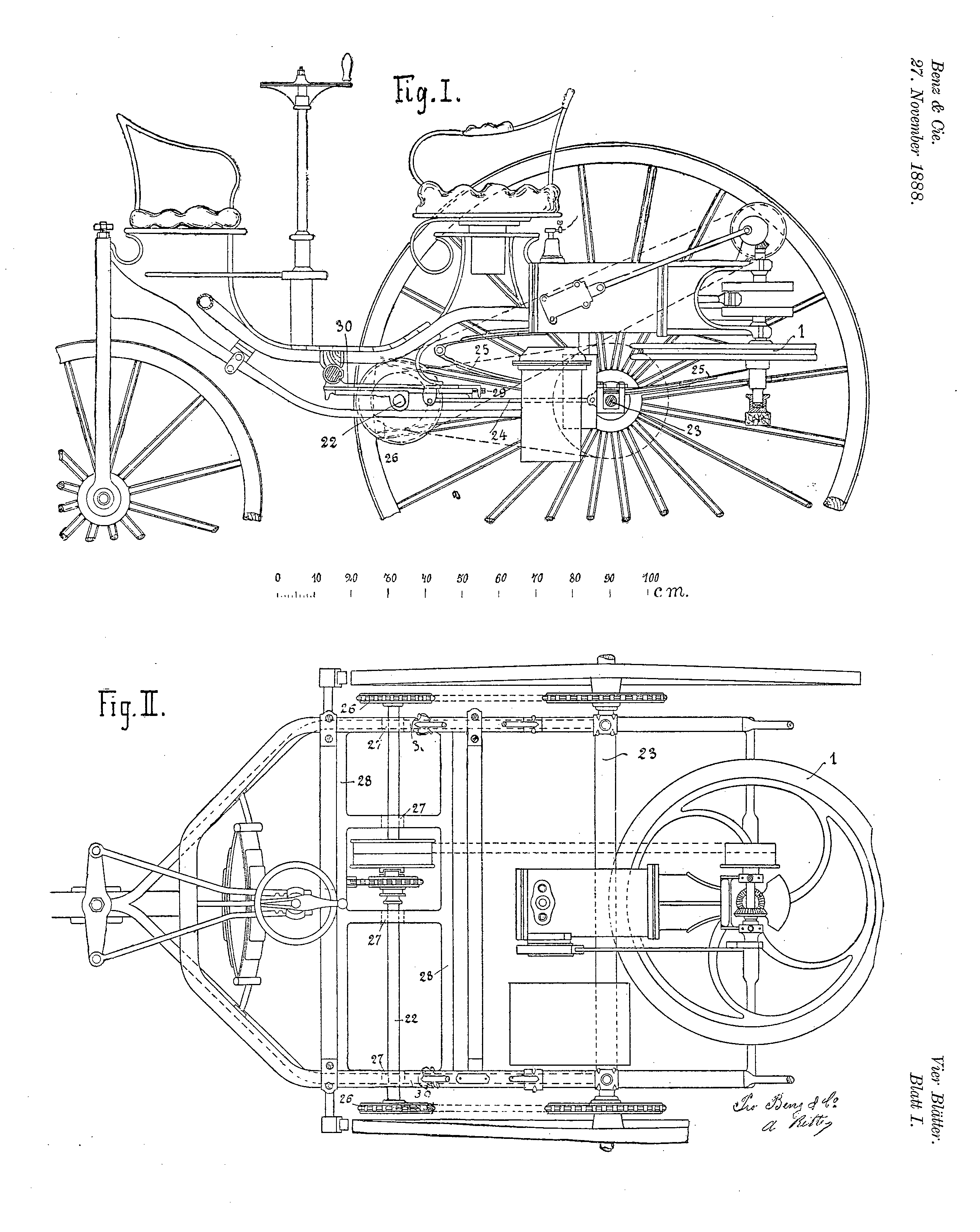
Side View (Fig. I) and Plan (Fig. II) from Patent CH960A

Benz was driving Nr. 2 round Mannheim in the summer of 1886. Around that time, or slightly earlier, he had been preparing plans for a motorised calèche (patent CH960). By 1888 he was making his first production model, referred to here as Model 2. In September 1888 he was pictured driving what is usually described as Nr. 3 round Munich with his wife Bertha beside him.

An incident during the trip by Benz's wife Bertha and their sons to Pforzheim in August 1888 implies that the Munich vehicle was not the one which the Benz family usually used. (Note: On p.91 of his Lebensfahrt, Benz says that when Bertha telegraphed him after her arrival in Pforzheim, he telegraphed back that she must send back the chains immediately as they were required for the vehicle which was to be exhibited in Munich. The implication is that it was another vehicle which was to be exhibited in Munich.) As Benz had also sold at least one vehicle (probably two) to Émile Roger by then, the vehicle Benz drove round Munich could not have been the third Patent-Motorwagen. The most probable explanation for the identification of the Munich vehicle as Nr. 3 is that they looked the same.

Benz was improving his vehicle continuously, replacing parts with better versions. The point at which Nr. 3 came into existence is therefore a bit fuzzy. It could be when the frame of the fully-suspended motorised calèche was built, when parts were transferred to it from Nr. 2 so that Nr. 2 could no longer run, or when the new vehicle moved under its own power.

The close similarity between Nr. 2 and Model 2 (see the images at the top of the preceding section) suggests that much of the mechanism of Nr. 2, including the transmission, could have been transferred into Nr. 3 unchanged. Given the tight reign on expenditure, maximum reuse of parts from Nr. 2 seems likely. New parts could then be substituted or added later until Nr. 3 was the prototype of Model 2.

The main differences between Nr. 2 and Model 2 (apart from the new frame and front) are:

- Nr. 2 had a combined drive/brake lever which moved the belt sideways when the lever was pushed fully fowards. Model 2 had a brake-only lever with a separate handle at the top which, when rotated, moved the belt sideways;
- fuel flowed to the carburettor of Nr. 2 once the cock on the fuel tank had been opened. It continued flowing until the cock was closed, regardless of whether the engine was running. Model 2 had a rotating plug valve controlled by the engine which sent fuel to the carburettor only when the engine was running. This required the fuel tank to be close to the cylinder rather than on top of the carburettor;
- the cylinder of Nr. 2 had bore x stroke of 90 x 150; the initial size used for Model 2 was 110 x 110;
- a wooden box with a leather tonneau cover was placed around and over the engine in Model 2 (these could be removed, hence the photograph of Model 2 without them). The coolant water reservoir above the cylinder was given a neck, around which a circular radiator sat, which dissipated the heat now that the engine was enclosed.

Apart from the fourth, which would have been done last, these changes are independent of each other and could have been done in any order. Development of Nr. 3 probably took place during late 1886 and 1887: Benz sold one vehicle (presumably not Nr. 3) in late 1887 and another soon after, so series production began in the second half of 1887. Around the end of 1887 the cylinder from Nr. 2, which had been in Nr. 1, was found a new use as a stationary engine in the works.

== Technical data for Models 2 and 3 ==
	Benz Patent-Motorwagen Models 2 and 3		
Motor	Single-cylinder, four-stroke engine with a large horizontal (Model 2) or vertical (Model 3) flywheel, mounted at the rear.		
	Initial Model 2	Model 2, Science Museum	
Displacement	1045 cm^{3}	1660 cm^{3}	1990 cm^{3}
Bore × Stroke	110 × 110 mm	115 × 160 mm	130 × 150 mm
Power	1103 W (1,5 PS) at 500 rpm	1839 W (2,5 PS) at 500 rpm	2206 W (3 PS) at 500 rpm
Fuel mixture preparation	Benz surface carburettor		
Valve control	1 manually-adjusted air-mixing valve between carburettor and intake valve		
Valve control	1 sliding intake valve		1 automatic intake valve
Valve control	1 vertical exhaust valve controlled by eccentric rod, cam disc, rocker arm, and pushrod		
Transmission	Belt drive to counter-shaft with loose and fixed pulleys, then chain drive to rear wheels Model 2 and pre-1890 Model 3: single belt system with a lever to shift belt between loose and fixed pulleys; sprocket-and-chain "gearbox" for low gear when belt is on loose pulley Model 3 from 1890: two speeds, each with its own belt system and hand lever to shift that belt between loose and fixed pulleys		
Front suspension	1 front steering fork, small transverse full-elliptic spring		
Rear suspension	Rigid axle, full-elliptic spring		
Steering	Rack and pinion; steering lever on a vertical stalk in the centre of the car		
Rear track width	1190 mm		
Wheelbase	1575 mm		
Kerb weight	360 kg (Note: The Science Museum gives the weight of its Model 2 as 479 kg.)		
Top speed	16 km/h	20 km/h	
Price	3.000 ℳ		

The primary source for this table is Oswald's Mercedes-Benz Personenwagen 1886 – 1945. No explanation is given for the three columns for different size of engine. The 1.5 hp of the first column corresponds to the power reported in the caption to Fig. 27 of Benz's Lebensfahrt and may represent the initial size of engine in the Model 2. The size 110 x 110 mm was subsequently used on the Benz Velo.

The cylinder of the Science Museum's Model 2 is 116 x 160 mm. The Museum describes it as 1.5 hp, perhaps because that is what the caption says on Fig. 27 of Benz's Lebensfahrt and the table above was not published until 1986. The caption also says that the vehicle depicted ran at 10 mph whereas, after restoration, C.F.Caunter found that it could run at 14 mph and in 1958 averaged 9 mph on the 56 miles of the London to Brighton run. (Note: In the 1925 Science Museum Catalogue, E.A.Forward reported that the vehicle's speeds were 5 and 10 mph. The difference may reflect the lower octane of early petrol, before the addition of tetra-ethyl lead in the 1920s. Modern measurements of the power output of old engines may not represent their performance on fuels of the time.)

The third column most likely relates to the two-belt Patent Motorwagen from 1890. The values are, however, puzzling. Oswald gives 130 x 130 = 1730 cm^{3} and 3 PS at 450 rpm for the early Viktoria and Vis-à-vis. This is corroborated by two examples in the Schlumpf collection (engine numbers 31 and 55 from 1893; Zardetti's 3-wheeler was number 24). Oswald gives 130 x 150 = 1990 cm^{3} and 4 PS at 500 rpm for later versions of the Viktoria and Vis-à-vis.

== Model 2 ==
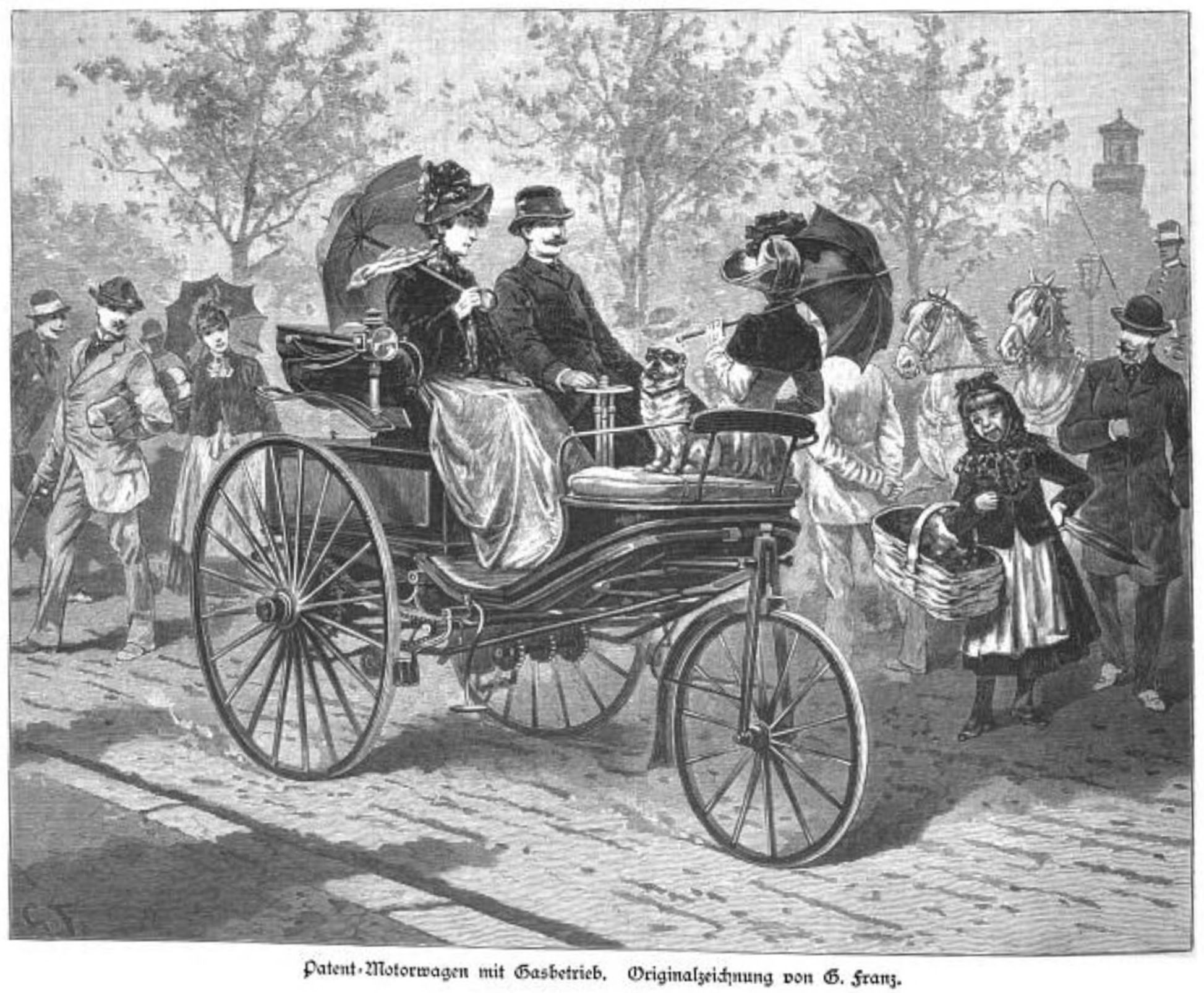
Carl and Bertha Benz driving around Munich in their Model 2 Patent-Motorwagen, September 1888

Benz made his first sale of a motor vehicle in 1887 to Émile Roger, a bicycle manufacturer who went on to become his French agent for motor cars. This sale seems to have been semi-private: Roger came to see Benz in Mannheim and Mercedes-Benz date public sale (and therefore production) as having started in 1888.

Benz Patent-Motorwagen Model 2 in Science Museum, London, c.1920 (above) vs. 1958 (below). The 1958 photograph is of the left side and has been mirrored.

In September 1888 Benz exhibited a vehicle in Munich and was pictured in a newspaper driving around Munich with his wife Bertha. The vehicle in that image matches the Science Museum's, which appears to be the only Model 2 of which photographs exist. It was restored in 1957, when its appearance was changed more closely to match the Munich vehicle. Most views show it from a low angle and the shape of the rear box cannot be seen. This photo shows it from a high angle, revealing the serpentine back with two doors, hinged where they meet the sides.

Another feature which is not often seen in photographs is the large circular radiator which sits over the coolant water reservoir and helps to dissipate heat. It can be seen on this photograph.

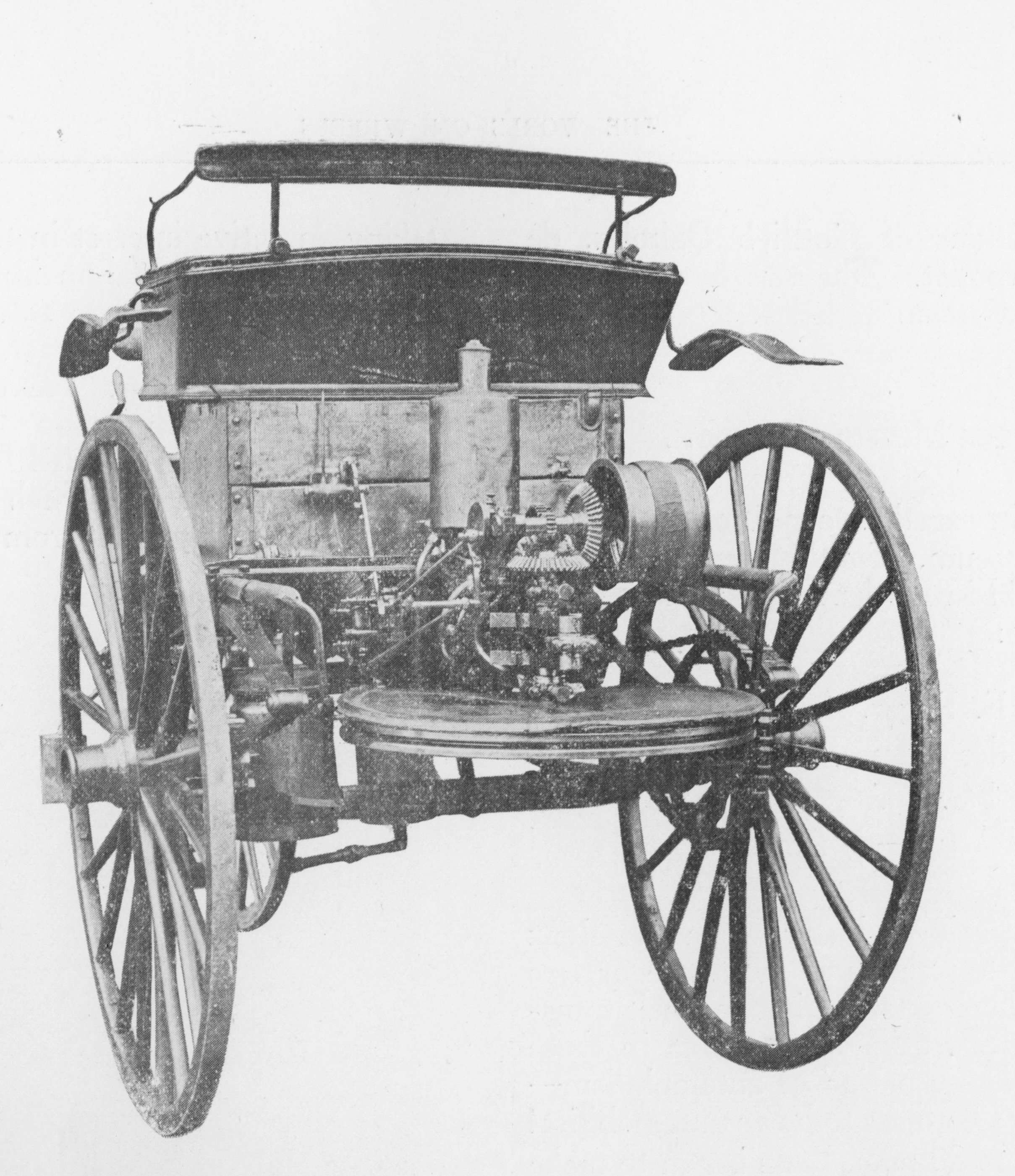
Rear view of Benz Patent-Model 2 in Science Museum, London, c.1920

Among the photographs taken in the 1920s of the Science Museum's Model 2 was one of its rear, showing the engine. In the Catalogue of the Collection of Mechanical Road Vehicles (1925), E.A.Forward describes it thus:

The motor is of the four-stroke type, and is placed horizontally over the rear axle; it has a single cylinder 116mm (4.57 in) diam. by 160mm (6.3 in) stroke, and when running at 250 to 300 rpm would develop about 1.5 h.p. The crankshaft is placed vertically because it was thought that the gyroscopic action of a vertical fly-wheel would adversely affect the steering, but this arrangement was abandoned as unnecessary about 1890. The lower end of the crankshaft carries the fly-wheel and is supported on a footstep bearing carried by a transverse member of the frame. To the upper end of the shaft a bevel wheel is fitted which gears with an equal wheel on a horizontal shaft that carries at its end a wide belt pulley. This shaft drives by spur gearing, at half the speed, a parallel shaft on which the cams for the valves and ignition are mounted. The exhaust valve is of the mushroom type and is fitted in the water-jacketed cylinder head, while the inlet is a slide valve fitted to the side of the cylinder. The explosive mixture is supplied by a surface carburettor in which the level of the spirit is maintained by dropping into it, from a storage tank under the seat, small quantities of spirit by means of a hollow plug valve slowly rotated by the engine. A mixing valve is placed between the carburettor and the inlet valve for diluting the mixture as required. The ignition is by battery, coil and sparking plug, but Benz originally tried a dynamo driven by a belt from the fly-wheel. The cylinder is water-cooled on the thermo-siphon system, the water circulating through the jacket and a radiating tank above it. As the water boils away, it is replaced by cold water from a tank under the seat. The exhaust gases are passed through a silencer, part being directed into the false bottom of the carburettor.

The photograph of the right-hand side of Science Museum's Model 2 was used as Fig. 27 of Benz's Lebensfahrt, a combined memoir and technical history published in 1925. Its caption translates as

My first production car from 1888. 1.5 hp, 2 speeds up to approximately 16 km/h, price at the time 3000 Marks

The number of Model 2's produced was very small, probably single-digit. Apart from the vehicle Benz sold to Roger in 1887, the one Benz drove round Munich in 1888 and the Science Museum's vehicle, there is strong evidence of:

- a vehicle which Roger had sold to Émile Levassor before March 1888;
- the vehicle which Benz himself used during 1888 (which Bertha used for her trip to Pforzheim) (Note: On p.91 of his Lebensfahrt, Benz says that when Bertha telegraphed him after her arrival in Pforzheim, he telegraphed back that she must send back the chains immediately as they were required for the vehicle which was to be exhibited in Munich. The implication is that it was another vehicle which was to be exhibited in Munich.)

There is also:

- an engraving of a Model 2 in a (Parisian?) street scene from 1890.

In The Birth of the British Motor Car (1982), T.R.Nicholson judged that the number of Patent-Motorwagen made to 1888, including the prototypes, was six. Sales numbers are discussed further in the section Sales numbers.

=== Bertha Benz's trip to Pforzheim; Climbing Hills ===
In his Lebensfahrt, Benz sets out the gestation of this trip:

It was the summer of 1888. The schools had closed their gates . . . in the minds of my boys—Eugen was 15, Richard 13—the audacious idea arose to take a newfangled holiday trip and drive out into the world in the car. "But we'll never get Father's permission," Richard lamented, deeply saddened. "Then we'll ask Mother," replied Eugen, "she's more daring than Father and will probably go with us." And so the plot was hatched.

No doubt Bertha saw the advantages of the publicity such a trip would create. She decided that the trip would be to her mother's in Pforzheim, some 50 miles away (60 miles by the route they took there; 50 miles for the return journey).

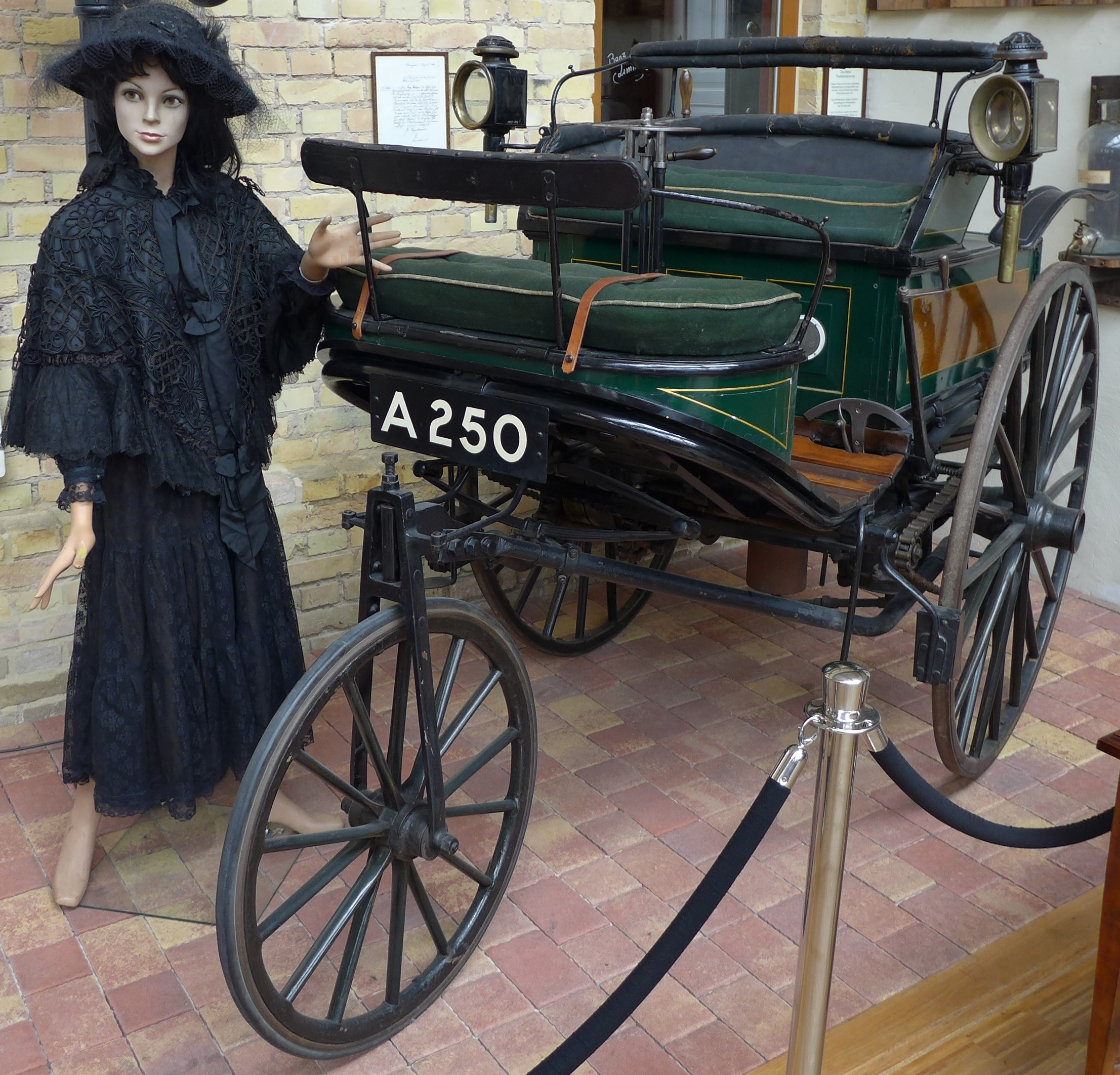
"Bertha Benz" beside the Science Museum's Model 2 at Automuseum Dr Carl Benz, Ladenburg, 2014

They set off at the crack of dawn one day in early August 1888. To continue in Benz's words:

Eugen was at the wheel, his mother beside him, and Richard in the small back[-facing] seat. Less than an hour later, they reached Heidelberg on the lovely, level road. Everything went well until Wiesloch, too. But then, as the roads became hilly, the trouble began. The transmission wasn't designed for such steep inclines. Eugen and his mother had to get out and push while Richard steered. Going downhill, his mother felt uneasy. What if the simple wooden brake with its leather covering suddenly failed? Fortunately, this didn't happen on the entire journey. However, new leather pads had to be bought from the village cobblers and nailed on again and again from time to time. The journey continued, but the leisurely drive was over. Since the chains were stretching and slipping off the gears; they stopped in front of a village blacksmith. The villagers arrive and admire the motor car as if it had just fallen from the sky. After the chains had been tightened, they continue on their way—until the next breakdown. The car stalls because the fuel line is blocked. Mother's hatpin is just the right surgical instrument to repair the damage. During another breakdown, when the ignition failed, the "first female long-distance driver" even sacrificed her garter as insulation.

Bertha was evidently enough of a mechanic to work out why the car had broken down and improvise solutions; she probably did most of the driving. Although this trip succeeded in gaining publicity, it demonstrated how primitive and unreliable the Model 2 was in August 1888, especially when put under pressure. Despite its low gear, it was unable to go up hills.

Benz appears to have responded with both a short-term fix and a long-term one. The short-term fix was to increase the power of the engine. The Science Museum's Model 2 has bore x stroke of 116 x 160mm. In Mercedes-Benz Personenwagen 1886 – 1945 Oswald gives three cylinder sizes for the Patent-Motorwagen: 110 x 110; 115 x 160; and 130 x 150.. The first is probably the original size for the Model 2 while the third is for the Model 3 with two belt-systems.

A standard way that car manufacturers increase the power of their engines at low cost is to bore out the cylinders a bit more, use piston rings and increase the stroke. This avoids the need for any changes to expensive castings. The similarity of the Science Museum's 116 x 160 to the (inferred) original 110 x 110 suggests that this is what Benz did (and that the Science Museum's engine was built after August 1888). (Note: The increase in the cylinder from 110 x 110 to 115 x 160 also confirms that the vehicle Bertha used was a Model 2 with the 1½ h.p. engine rather than a version of the original vehicle with its ⅔ h.p. engine.)

== Model 3 ==
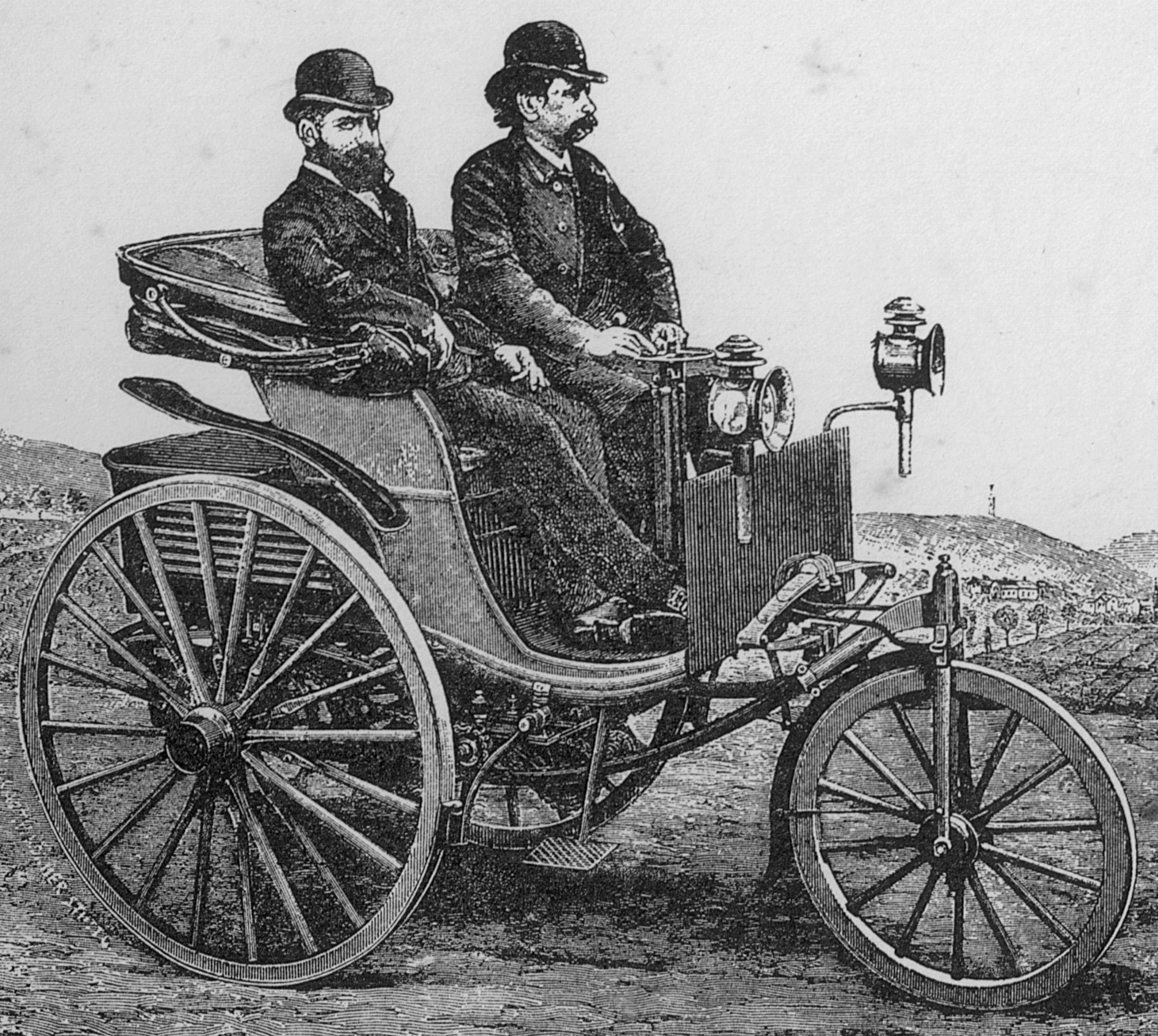
Carl Benz driving a Benz Patent-Motorwagen Model 3, 1888

=== Single-belt version ===
Model 3 differs from Model 2 mainly in the appearance of its body. The image here appeared in Worby Beaumont with the caption "Benz third motor carriage // Made in 1888, for running at 12–15 miles an hour". (Note: As Fig 27 of Benz's Lebensfahrt shows the Science Museum's Model 2, which it acquired in 1913, it can be inferred that, in 1900, the only image of Model 2 which was known was the Munich image of 1888.) It is derived from a photograph taken outside the works in Mannheim. The photograph is sufficiently clear to be able to see the vehicle's horizontal flywheel and the reduction gearbox in front of the counter-shaft, so a single belt-drive.

The main changes to the bodywork were:

- at the front, the rear-facing seat was replaced by a vertical dash or splashboard, immediately behind the elliptic springs;
- at the back, the single wooden box which enclosed the engine and the seat was changed to emphasise the passenger-carrying part with the rear box subservient

As part of the changes, two large water tanks / radiators at the sides of the rear box replaced the water tank beneath the seat. The water tanks / radiators were responsible for the distinctive horizontal ribs on the sides of the rear box. (Note: The water tanks ameliorated but did not solve a problem which continued to plague owners of Benz cars through the 1890s: their prodigious water consumption: see pp. 131–132 of Worby Beaumont.)

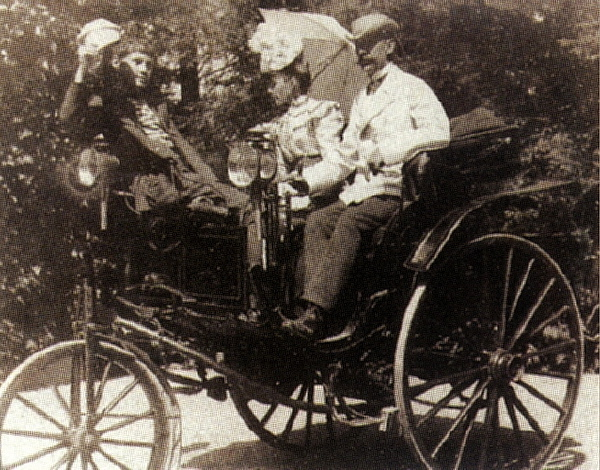
Eugen Zardetti, his wife and son in his Benz Patent-Motorwagen Model 3, 1893

An optional extra was a single rear-facing seat, as used by Eugen Zardetti's son on the 1893 photograph of him in his (two-belt-system) Model 3. It was cantilevered out from the front panel, hanging over the front suspension and the front wheel, as can be seen more clearly in the image in the Mercedes-Benz Public Archive.

In his Lebensfahrt, Benz tells the story of selling an 1888 car to a schoolmistress from Sommerein (now Šamorín in Slovakia). He refers to Eugen (born 1873) delivering it, driving the 50 miles from Vienna. This (and Benz's wording) suggests that the sale took place some years after 1888. A testimonial by Róza Kalocsa from Šamorín in an 1893 Benz brochure describes how well her car runs on level ground. As Benz explains that the teacher couldn't afford one of his cars but did then buy it (with assistance from a colleague), the most plausible explanation is that the single-belt horizontal-flywheel Model 3 was built in 1888 and sold to her in 1892 at a discount.

Benz exhibited at the 1889 Paris Exposition and had a display there which was separate from Roger's. It would appear that he was able to show the single-belt Model 3, while Roger had the Model 2. Benz had "practically no success".

Roger was a much better salesman, and at some time sold the Model 2 which was exported to England. It seems unlikely that he made no sales at the Expo to French customers. In 1893 vehicles were being made to order with a deposit of one third of the price being taken when the order was placed. (Note: This is documented in the 1893 sales brochure and the purchase by Theodor von Liebieg of his Viktoria: he paid 1500 Marks when he placed his order on 31 October 1893 with the balance before delivery.) Orders for Model 2's which Roger took at the Expo and afterwards would have been manufactured in 1889 and possibly into 1890.

=== Twin-belt version ===
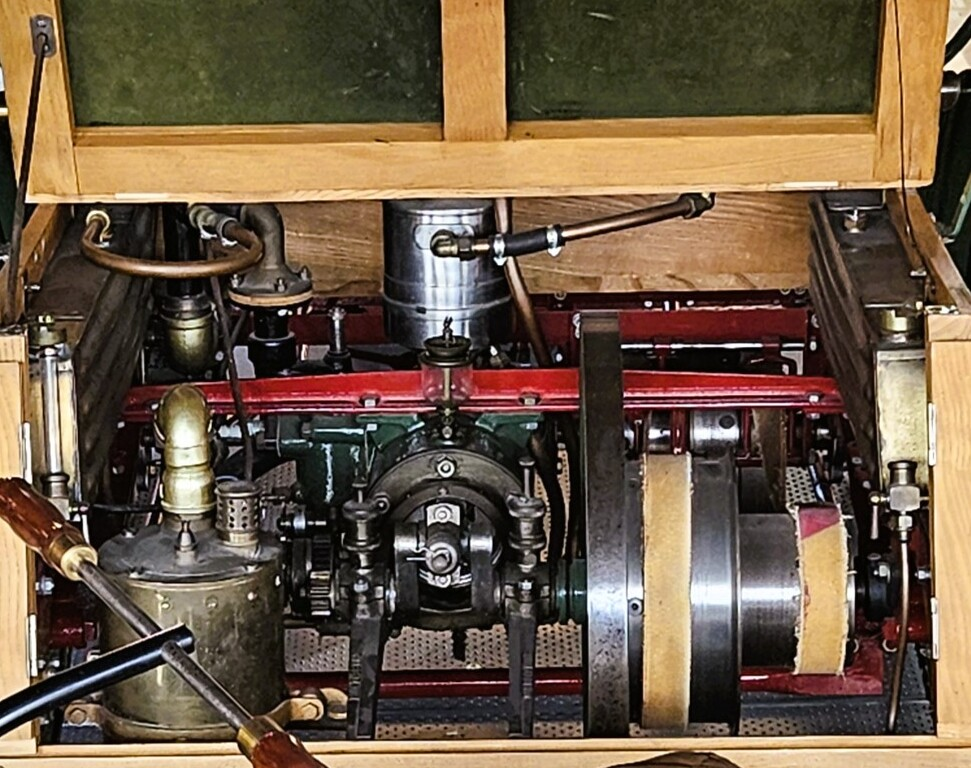
Two-speed engine of Benz Velo, 1894. The vertical flywheel is immediately to the left of the left pulley

Although Bertha's trip to Pforzheim in August 1888 had succeeded in gaining publicity, it had exposed the vehicle's inability to go up hills, despite its second, low gear.

Two causes may be inferred from the response: insufficient power; and slipping of the belt on the drive pulley. The short-term fix appears to have been to increase the power from the existing cylinder casting by increasing its bore and stroke. The longer-term response was a new, larger cylinder casting along with a second belt-system instead of the reduction gearbox. The two-belt vehicles used crossed belts rather than straight, so the switch from straight to crossed belts appears also to have been part of the response.

While it would have been apparent why the car couldn't go up hills, it would have been harder to work out how to fix it. Increasing the power of the engine would help, but could exacerbate the problems with slippage of the belt. Increasing the tension in the belt would make it harder to move the belt between the loose and the fixed pulley. The solution adopted – adding a second belt-system – involved a substantial redesign of the engine. That alone indicates the seriousness of the problem and the time, effort and cost required to overcome it. It may have increased the other directors' concerns about the direction of the business and their withdrawal in 1890 (see the section The Pivot Year: 1890).

With the addition of a second belt-system, the controls were changed. In Model 2, turning the handle at the top of the main lever on the left moved the belt between the loose and fixed pulleys while a hand lever on a separate stalk next to the steering engaged the clutch for the low gear. With two belts, the handle at the top of the main lever was replaced by two hand levers below the steering, one for each belt.

Zardetti's appears to be the only surviving Model 3. It has the vertical flywheel, as can be seen beneath the rear box in the side-view of it in the Technical Museum in Vienna. (Note: Zardetti had this vehicle modified to four wheels in 1898.) An image of the engine of his vehicle shows it to be similar to that of the Velo of 1894. This includes the positioning of the carburettor at the left back of the engine bay and a silencer in the form of a horizontal cylinder running side-to-side beneath the engine cylinder with a small fraction of the exhaust being tapped off on entry in a pipe to the base of the carburettor.

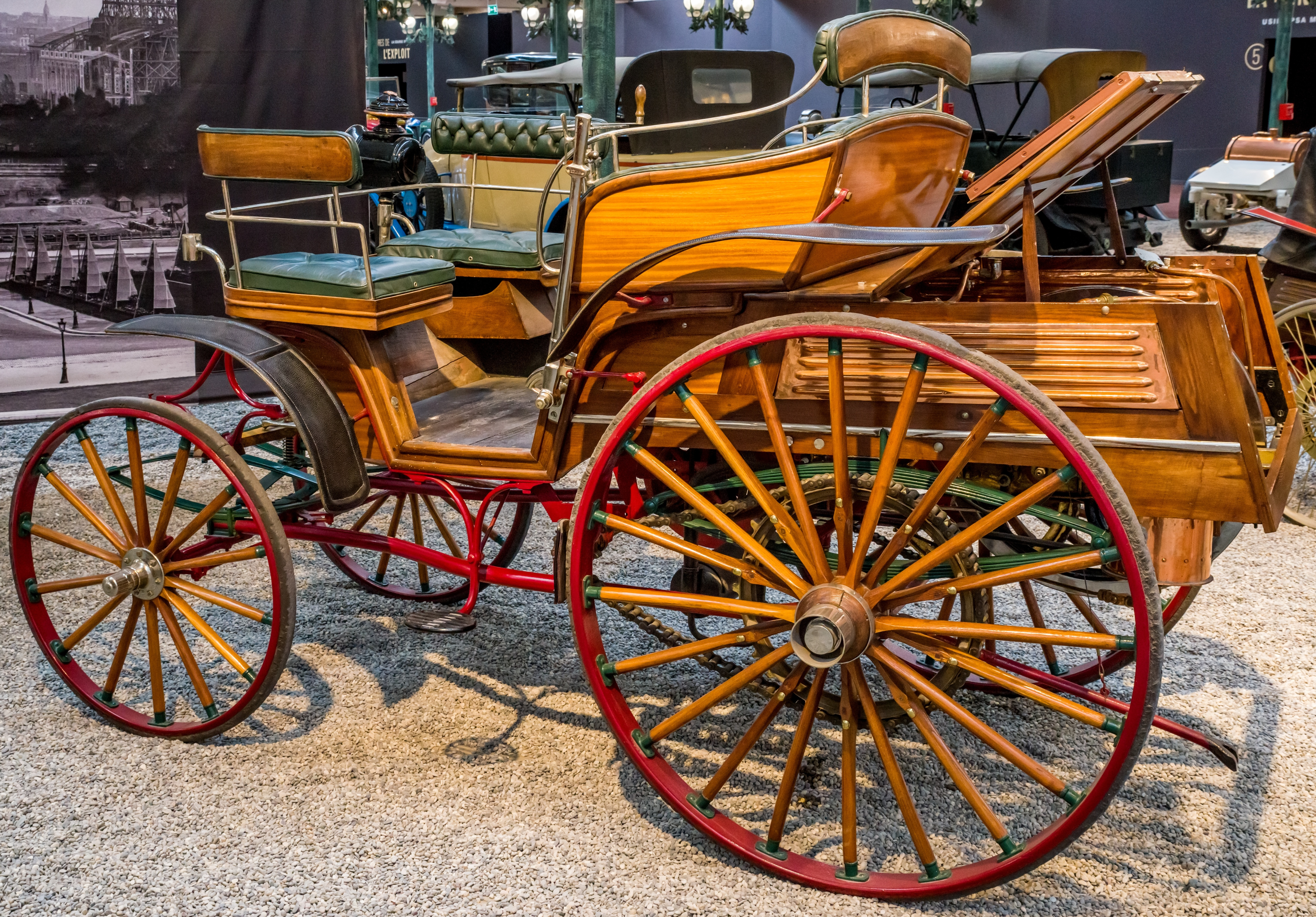
Benz Vis-à-vis (1893). The rear end is essentially a larger version of the Patent-Motorwagen Model 3. The brake blocks have leather brake pads.

The wheels appear to be of standard wooden construction: in the photograph of Carl Benz and Josef Brecht in a Model 3, the felloes are made from two laminas of bent wood. Later vehicles, e.g. the Vis-à-vis of 1893 have a metal rim to which the spokes are fixed by special-purpose connectors. As can be seen in the meticulously restored Vis-à-vis, the wooden brake blocks on that vehicle had been superseded by brass ones with leather brake pads.

In 1890 Friedrich von Fischer and Julius Gauss replaced Max Rose and Friedrich Esslinger as directors of Benz & Cie. This allowed Benz to spend more time and money developing his vehicle; a professional sales operation was introduced to complement Roger's activities in France. Sales of the two-belt Model 3 may have begun in 1890 but outside France are unlikely to have been before 1891.

== Rebuild of Motorwagen Nr. 1 ==
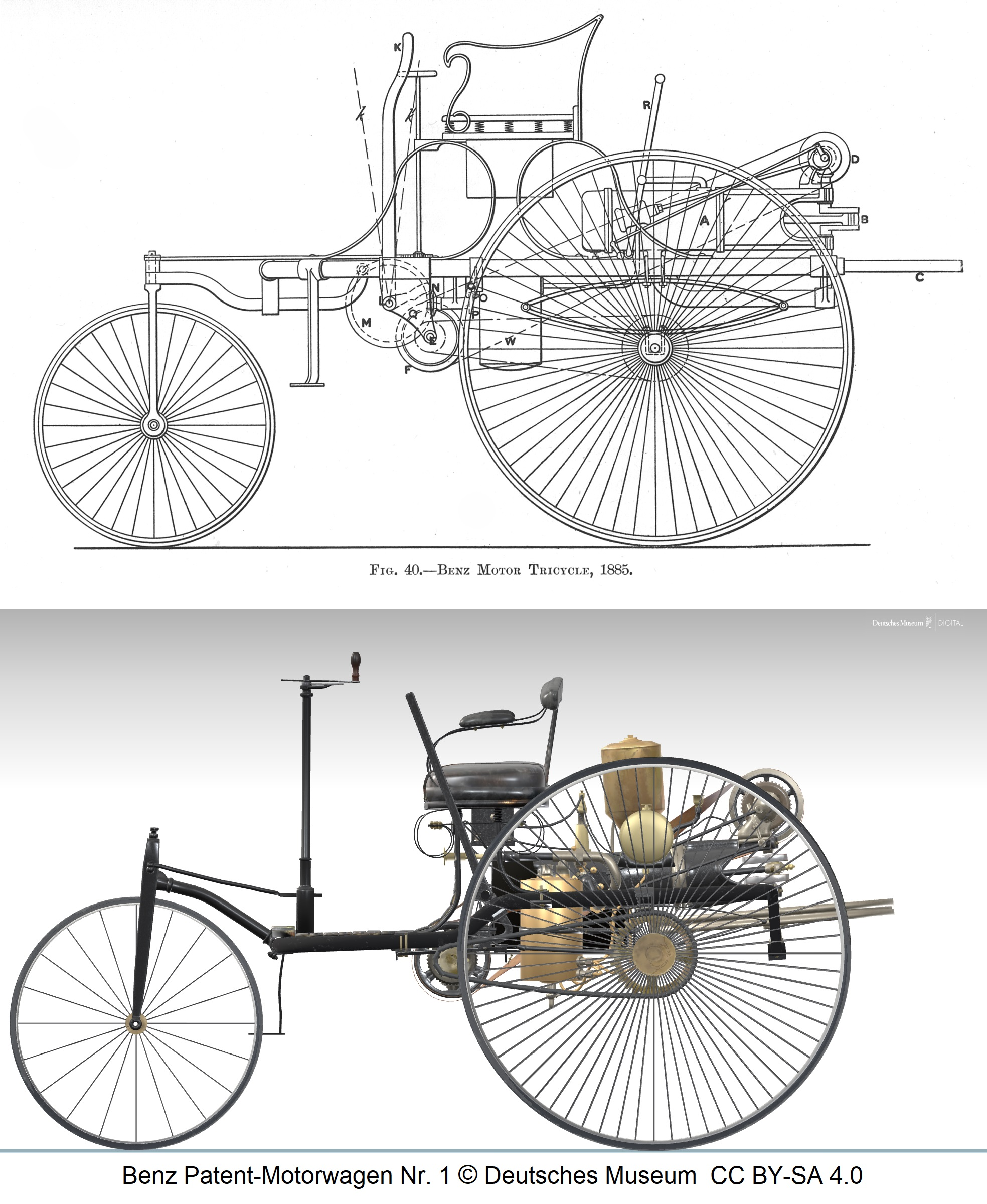
Side views from patent DRP37435 and 3D model of the 1895 rebuild in Deutsches Museum (Note: The side view of the 1895 rebuild is an orthographic view from the Museum's 3D model of the vehicle. Any photograph inevitably shows both rear wheels with the further one smaller than the nearer, confusing the image. On an orthographic view both wheels are identical in size with the further concealed behind the nearer. Unfortunately, the 3D model contains a mistake: the spokes on each side of the front wheel are shown aligned and sharing a hole in the rim. They alternate, as the 3D model shows on the rear wheel.)

Around 1895 the Sales Manager at Benz had surviving parts of the original vehicle sought out with a view to recreating its first form, the motorised velocipede. The reconstructed vehicle was photographed in the late 1890s. In 1906 it was given to the Deutsches Museum in Munich. In 1925 it headed a procession of historic vehicles with Benz at the controls. A video from the 1920s or 1930s shows it being demonstrated. It remains in the Museum today.

The original vehicle appears to have been rebodied twice. It seems likely that the motorised velocipede was developed further after the drawings for patent DRP37435 had been prepared and that the 1895 rebuild was based on its final form before it was given a new body as Nr. 2.

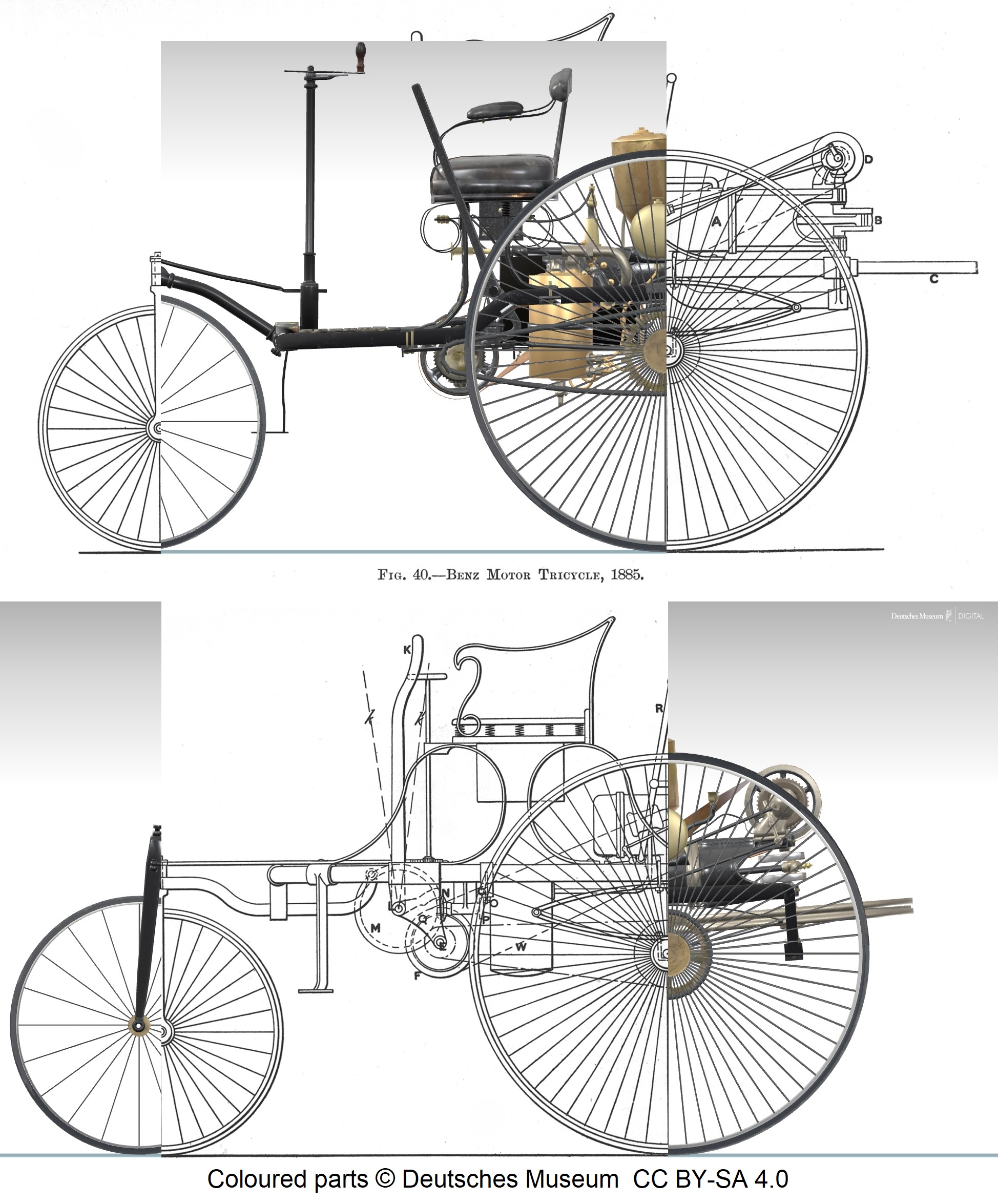
Side view from patent DRP37435 overlaid by parts from 3D model of the 1895 rebuild in Deutsches Museum

The 1895 rebuild provides evidence as to the final form which Nr. 1 took. But it is not an accurate copy. Its carburettor is from the Benz Velo and it uses a crossed drive belt, which appears to have been introduced with the two-belt Model 3. A sight gauge has been added to the carburettor, as in the 1880s, but it is not positioned as in the 1880s.

Other changes may have been made to make the vehicle easier and safer to drive. The platform in patent DRP37435 is 80cm above the ground; in the rebuild it is 60cm. Benz's expenditure on his private project was severely constrained. As his aim was a true horseless carriage, it seems unlikely that he would have given the motorised velocipede a new frame first. (Note: This is explored further in the section Rebuild of the original vehicle.) These issues are explored further in the section Rebuild of Patent-Motorwagen Nr. 1.

Replicas of the rebuilt vehicle have been produced from the mid-twentieth century. About 150 examples from various suppliers have been made. In 2001, Daimler (now Mercedes-Benz Group) began manufacturing replicas by hand. They can run on petrol but are not permitted on public roads.

== Conclusion ==
The Patent-Motorwagen has been recognised as the first practical automobile (Nr. 2) and the first to enter production (Model 2). (Note: Amédée Bollée's steam car, La Mancelle, of 1878 was the first car to enter series production. About 50 were manufactured in 1878-81, including 22 by Maschinenfabrik und Eisengießerei F. Wöhlert in Berlin from 1880-82.) As its creator, Carl Benz has been hailed as the father and inventor of the automobile.

== Development and specifications ==
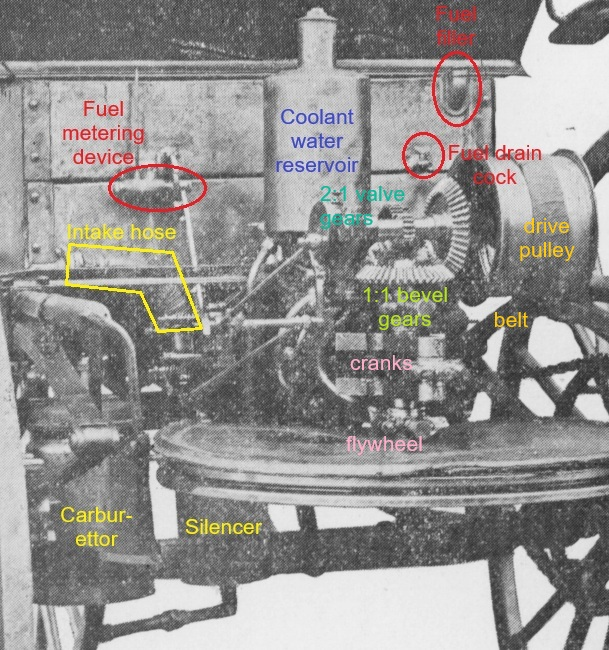
View of the engine of 1888 Benz Patent-Motorwagen Model 2 showing the parts, c.1920

In 1873 Benz developed a successful town-gas-powered two-stroke piston engine. He was less successful in running a company and in 1883 was supported to found a new company with solid finances but in which he held only a 5% shareholding. He was already working on a four-stroke engine and on using vaporised hydrocarbon fuels instead of town gas. His dream remained, to employ a gas engine to power a horseless carriage.

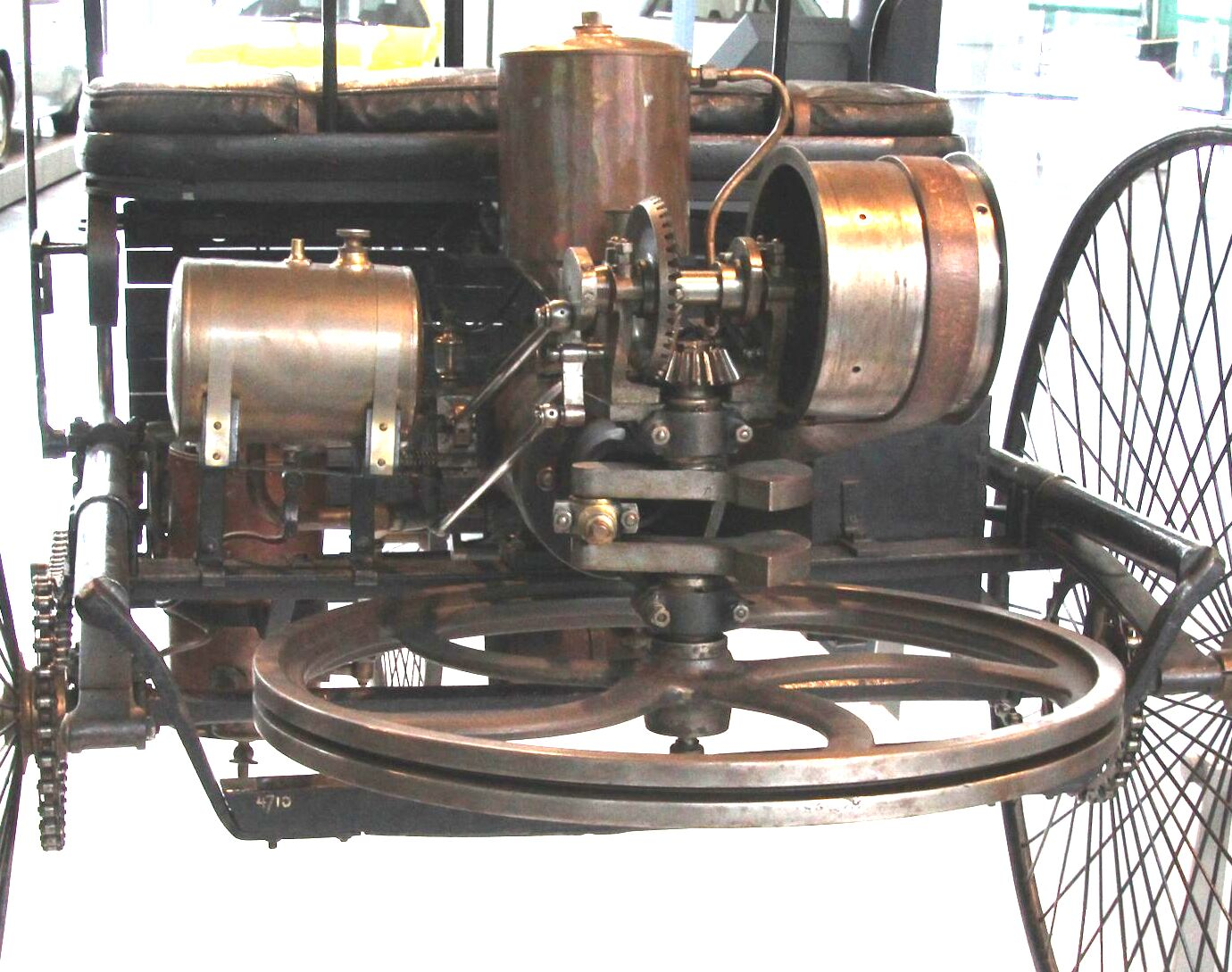
Engine of 1895 rebuild of original vehicle in Deutsches Museum, 2015

Benz started work on his Motorwagen in 1884 in his own time, outside his responsibilities as a director of the company. He continually made changes to it, so it is hard to tie down details of its specification at any particular date. What can be said is that the first version which Benz was happy to take into Mannheim and be seen in was the Patent-Motorwagen Nr. 2 in summer 1886. This was his first practical car: it fixed the greatest inadequacies in the design of Nr. 1 and was sufficiently reliable not to have to worry about constant breakdowns.

The Benz Patent-Motorwagen was a motor tricycle with a rear-mounted engine. The vehicle contained many new inventions. It had a frame of steel tubing with a floor of wooden slats. The steel-spoked wheels and solid rubber tyres in Nr. 1 were replaced with wooden wheels in Nr. 2.

=== Steering and Suspension ===
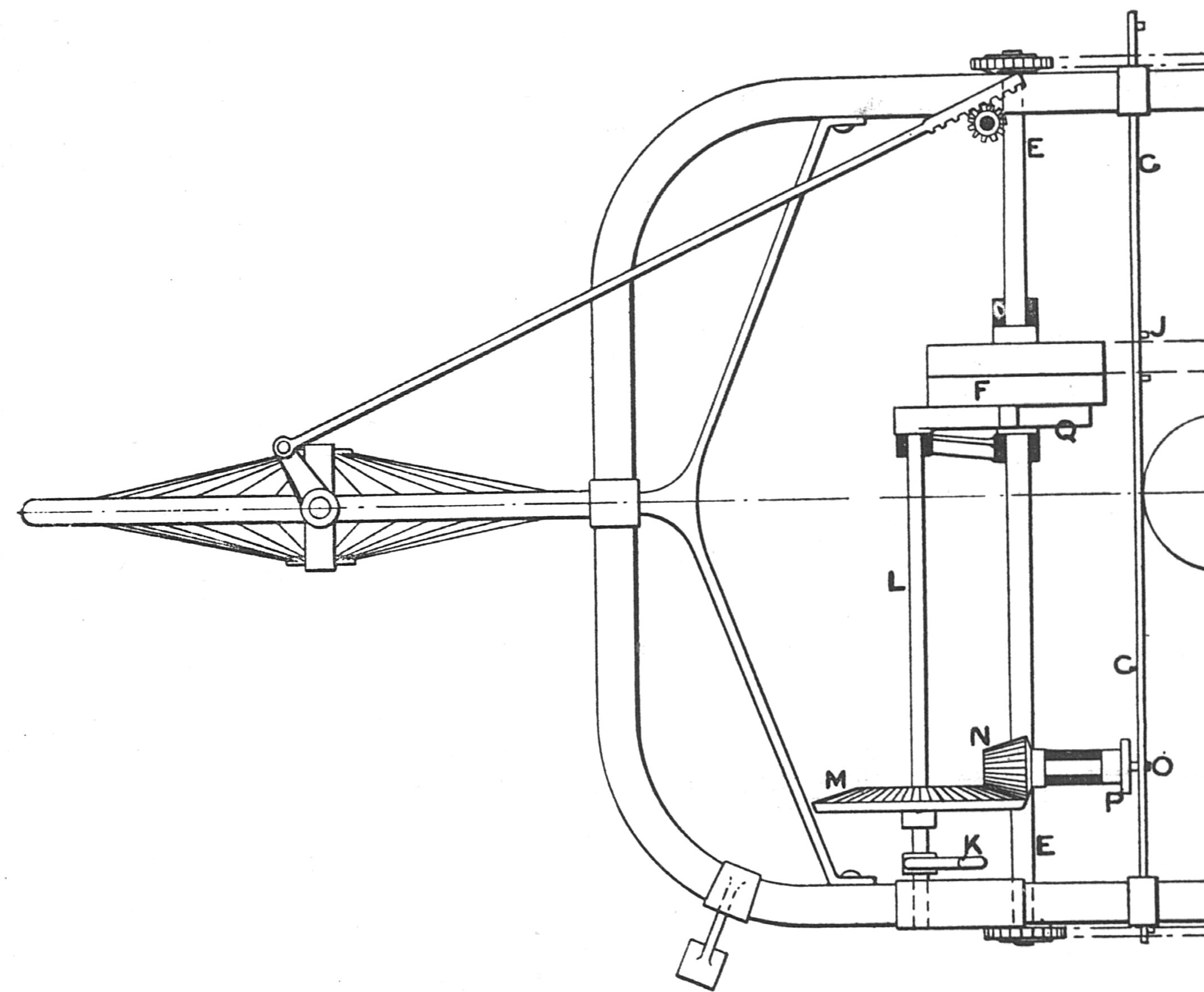
Plan of the front of Nr. 1 showing the steering and the counter-shaft with the mechanism to move the belt

Steering was by way of a pinion acting on a toothed rack that pivoted the front wheel. In Nr. 1 the stalk to control the steering was at the right edge and the rod to the front wheel ran above the floor. In Nr. 2 it was moved to the centre, just in front of the counter-shaft. In the longer-wheelbase production models, it was moved further forward.

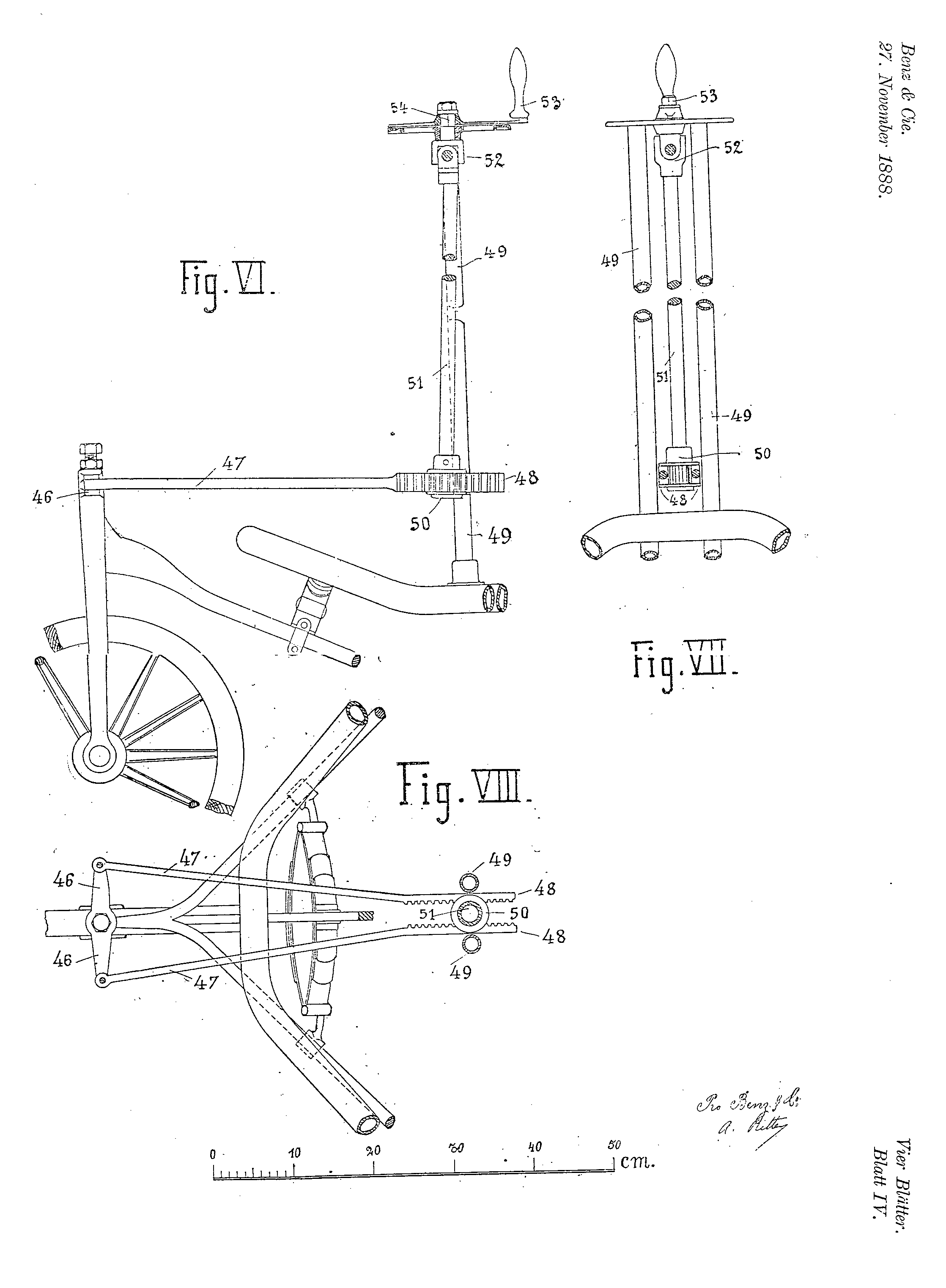
Side (Fig. VI), rear (Fig. VII) and top (Fig. VIII) views of the steering system in Nr. 2, Nr. 3 and Model 2 from Patent CH960A

Elliptic springs were used at the back along with a beam axle and chain drive on both sides. The front wheel in Nr. 1 and Nr. 2 was unsprung; elliptic springs were added in the production models.

The quality of the ride was a function not only of the springs but also of the wheels, which were wooden, with thin felloes and (as regards the rear wheels) of large diameter. At the speed which the Patent Motorwagen went, its wooden wheels flexed as they turned, providing a ride comparable to that of the equivalent horse-drawn carriage.

=== Transmission and Brakes ===
In Nr. 1, a belt system served as a single-speed transmission, varying torque between a drive pulley and a two-part pulley on a counter-shaft (see the plan of the front of Nr. 1 above). As the drive/brake lever was moved forward from its central position, the fork J shifted the belt from the loose pulley on the counter-shaft E to the fixed pulley F; this is similar to lifting the clutch pedal with a manual gearbox. As the drive/brake lever was moved back from its central position, the spindle L applied a steel band brake to the brake pulley, which was cast with the fixed pulley F (see the view of the underside of the rebuilt original vehicle, although it merges spindle L with rod G).

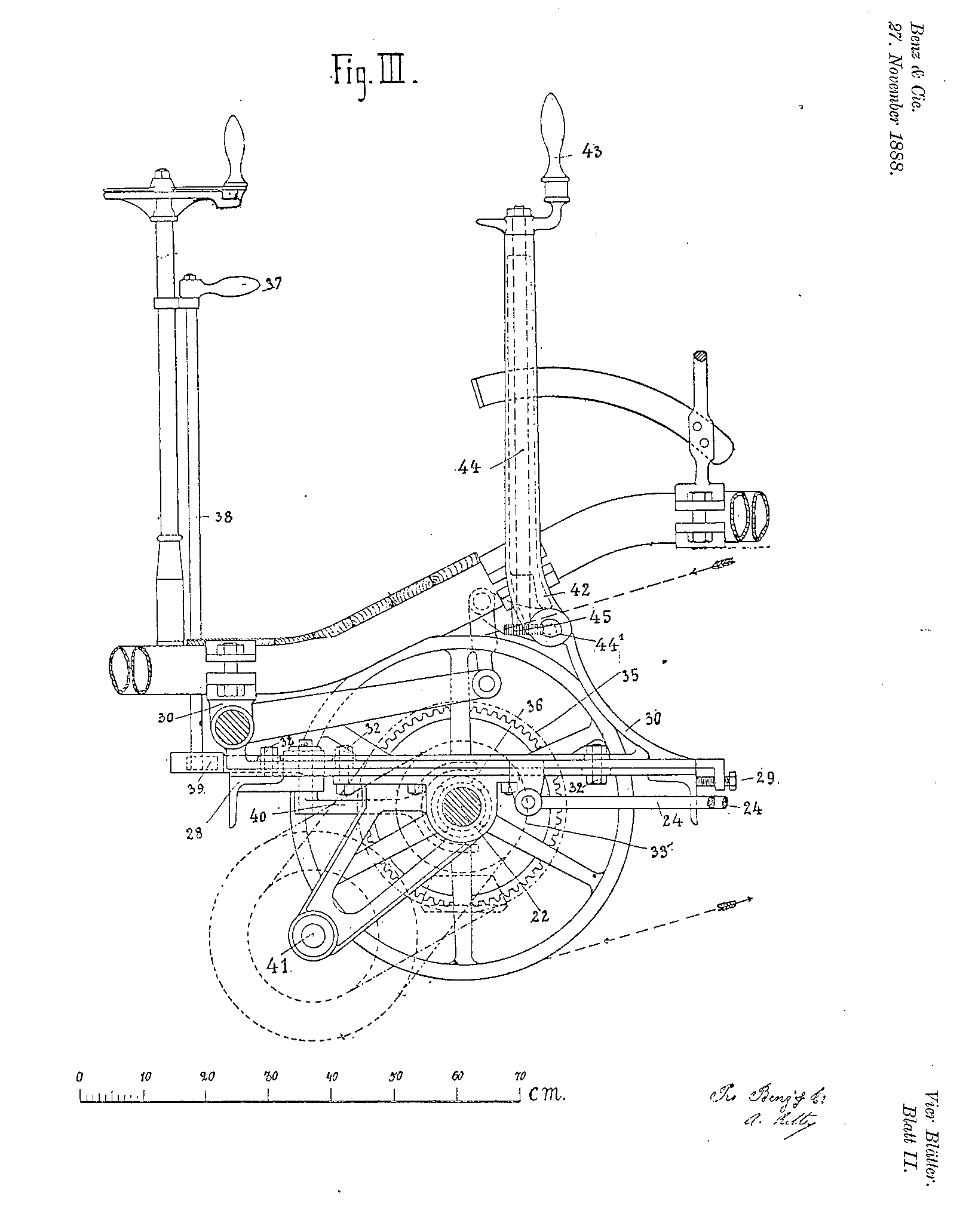
Side view of controls and counter-shaft in Nr. 2, Nr. 3 and Model 2 from Patent CH960A

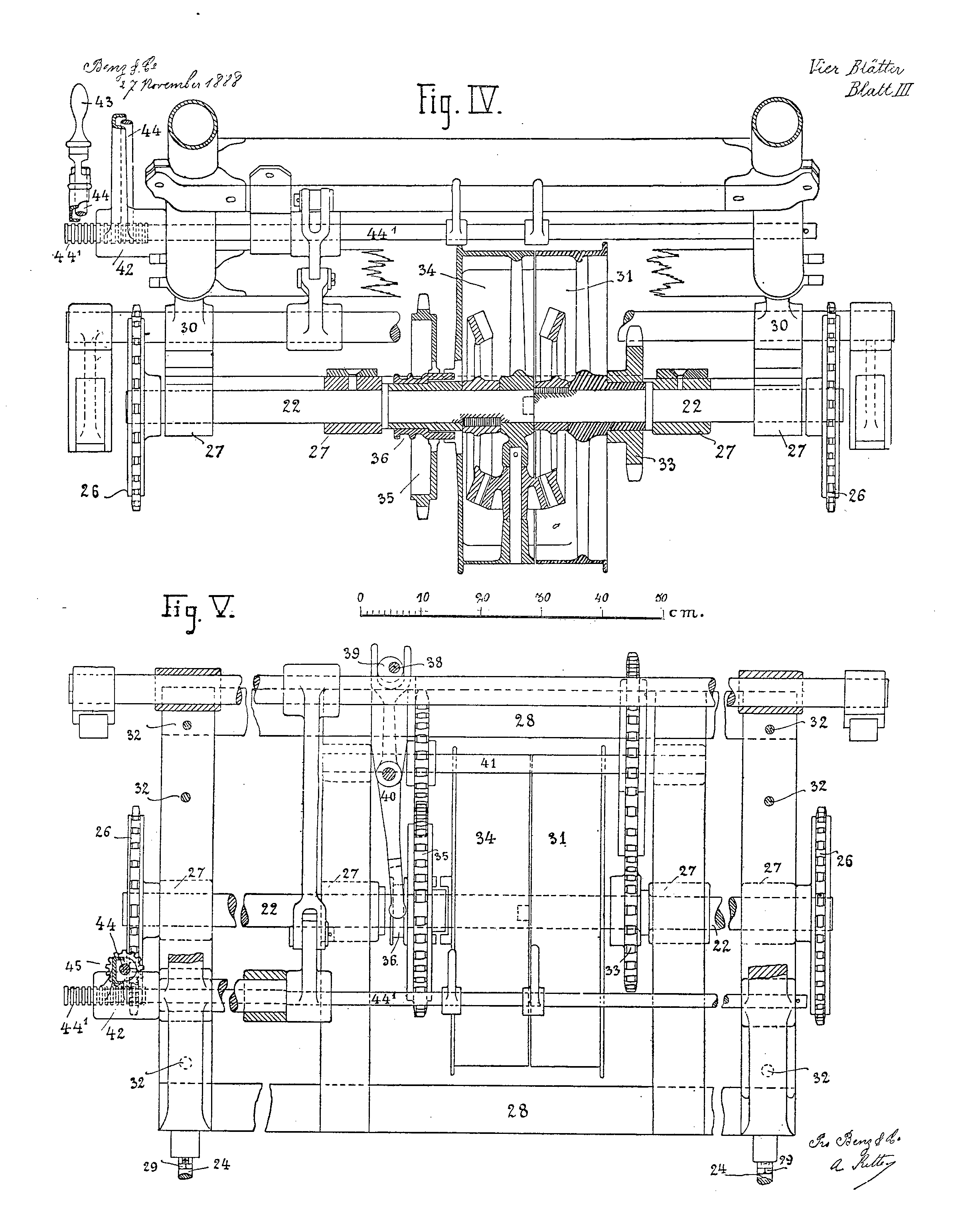
Section (Fig IV) and Plan (Fig. V) of Transmission at Counter-shaft in Nr. 2, Nr. 3 and Model 2 from Patent CH960A

From Nr. 2, a gearbox was added to the single belt-system to provide a low gear for climbing hills. (Note: The auxiliary shaft of the gearbox is clearly visible in the photograph of Nr. 3 (Mercedes-Benz Public Archive Number 22390) and beneath the London Science Museum's Model 2. On the engraving of Nr. 2 from Worby Beaumont, the end of the auxiliary shaft can be seen just below the leftward curve of the reverse "S" to the step to get into the vehicle. The nearer sprocket is smaller than the one behind it.) This was engaged by moving a hand lever beneath the steering control when the belt was on the loose pulley 31 (Fig. V of patent CH960A). Fixed to the loose pulley was sprocket 33 which drove sprocket 35 through reduction gearing on auxiliary shaft 41. When the hand lever on stalk 39 was moved, it engaged the clutch 36 to connect sprocket 35 to fixed pulley 34 and so drive the counter-shaft 22 at reduced speed.

Regardless of how the counter-shaft was driven, a differential inside the pair of fixed and loose pulleys 31 and 34 ensured that the wheels went at the correct speeds when cornering. Chains on each side provided the final drive from the counter-shaft to the rear wheels. There was no reverse.

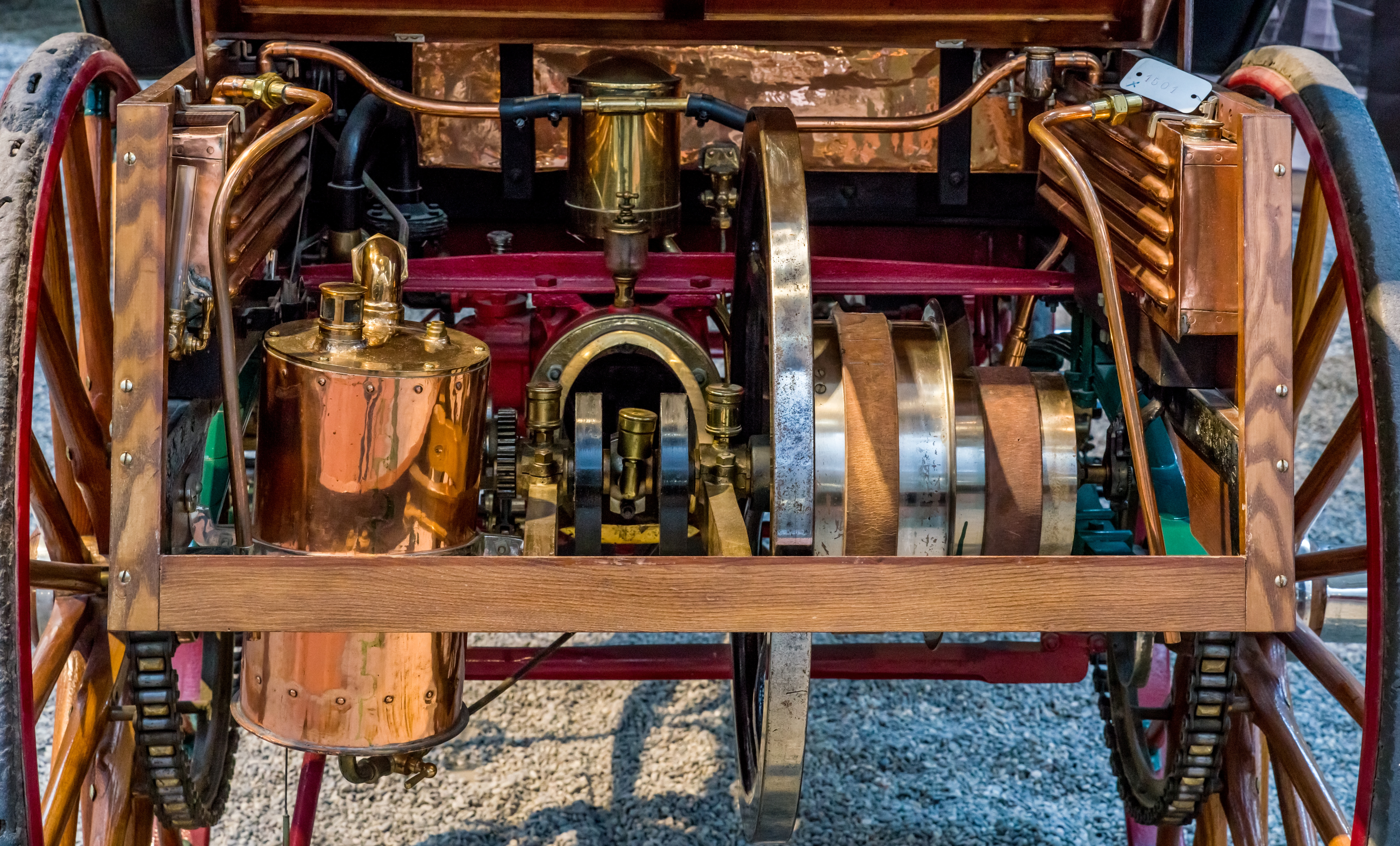
3 h.p. engine of a Benz Vis-à-vis (1893). The vertical flywheel is in the centre; to its right are two belt systems, one for each "gear"

Model 3 started as a single-belt vehicle with the flywheel horizontal. Later, a second belt-system was added, replacing the reduction gearbox. The low-speed belt system was added to the right of the existing one (see the image of the Vis-à-vis of 1893), with separate hand levers to control whether that belt was driving the vehicle or not.

When the second belt-system was added, the flywheel was switched from horizontal to vertical, eliminating the bevel gears between crankshaft and driveshaft. Worby Beaumont provides details of how the twin belt-drive system worked in the "Ideal" of 1898–99.

As the belts on all twin-belt vehicles are crossed but there is no evidence of crossing on the single-belt vehicles (Figs I and II of patent CH960A show straight belts and the belt is straight in the surviving Model 2), crossing appears to date from the introduction of the second belt-system. It may have been part of the response to slipping of the belt, which seems most likely to have been the reason why Bertha needed to get out and push on her journey to Pforzheim.

The brake in Nr. 1 was a band brake on a brake pulley on the counter-shaft. In Nr. 2 and subsequent versions this was replaced by wooden block brakes on the iron tyres of the rear wheels. The band brake of Nr. 1 could not be retained because the clutch of the reduction gearbox on Nr. 2 lay where the brake pulley had been. (Note: There is what appears to be a brake pulley on the counter-shaft of the Model 2 in the Science Museum in London. As Caunter does not mention it in his description of the vehicle in his Handbook, it can be inferred to be part of the second brake added in 1958 after he failed to be able to stop it during the London to Brighton veteran car run in 1957; see https://porschecarshistory.com/wp-content/old/lib/magazines/autosport/1957/AS1957.11.08.pdf)

In all versions of the Patent-Motorwagen, when the lever on the left was moved back beyond the centre-point, it applied the brakes. The performance of early brakes was poor: on Bertha's trip to Pforzheim on a Model 2, the passengers had to get out and walk down hills. She repeatedly bought leather which she fixed to the brakes when it wore through. (Note: Cyclists with steel-rimmed wheels used leather brake blocks rather than rubber because their performance degraded much less in the wet.)

Braking must have remained poor on the Patent-Motorwagen: in 1898 Zardetti added to his Model 3 a hand-wheel which applied a band brake on the counter-shaft.; in 1958 Caunter added a pedal to the Science Museum's Model 2 which did the same thing. (Note: The pedal is inferred from the Science Museum's object 1913-491/63: Metal pedal from the three wheeled motor car.) Around 1896 Benz provided a better solution on the Velo: he added a pedal which applied band brakes to drums fixed to the rear wheel sprockets. (Note: This may have inspired the second brake added to the Science Museum's Model 2 in 1958; see object 1913-493/63, Metal pedal from the three wheeled motor car.)

=== Carburettor and Exhaust System ===
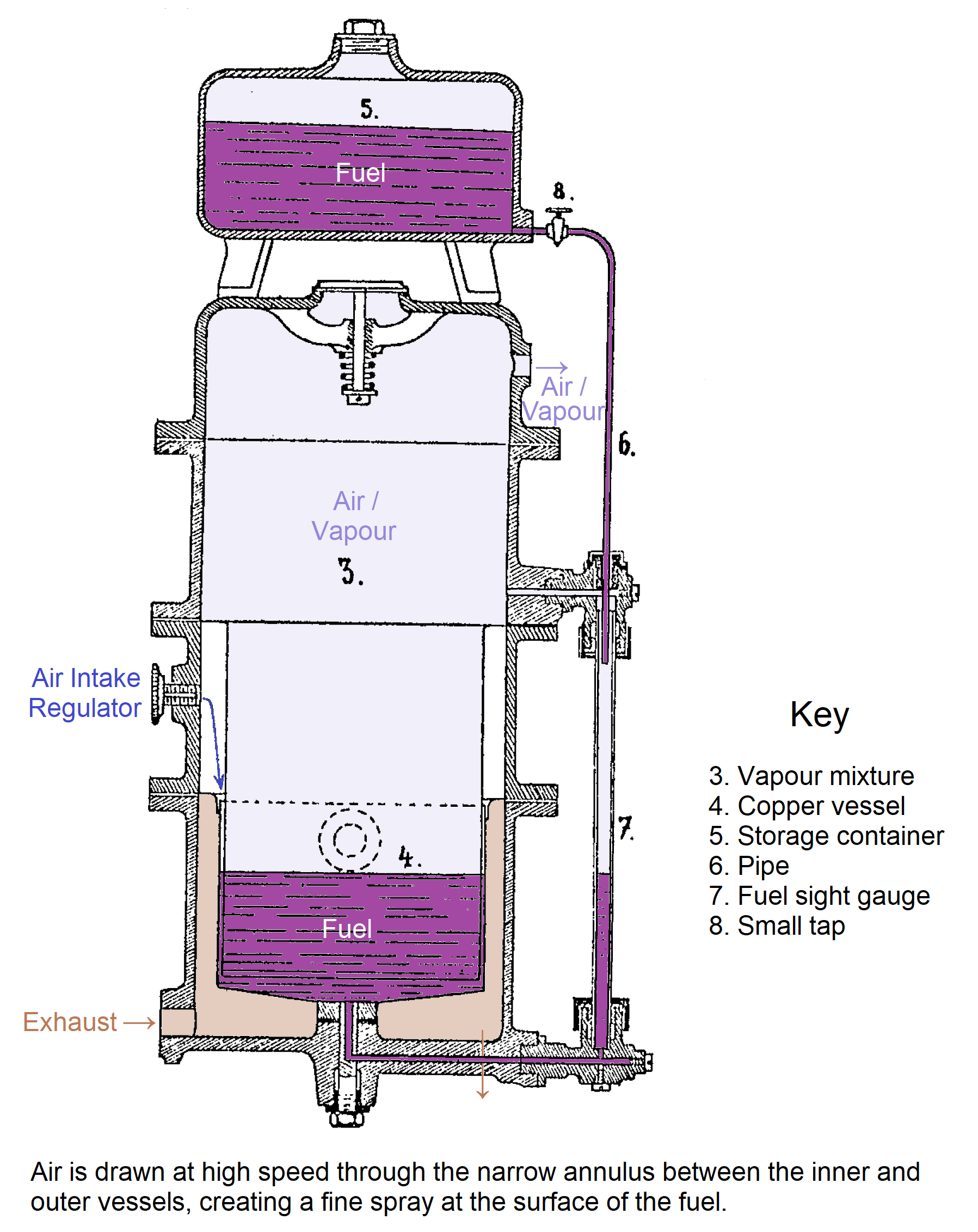
Schematic of Benz Carburettor of 1885 from Patent DRP37435 (Note: The concentric dashed lines above the fuel may represent an overflow pipe. If the engine is stopped, fuel continues to flow into the carburettor until cock 8 is closed.)

The carburettor seems to have been the part which gave Benz most trouble: he continued to develop it for many years with two further patents, the earlier being submitted in April 1887. He appears only to have been satisfied with the form used on the Benz Velo, which was also used in the 1895 rebuild of Nr. 1.

The patent drawings for Nr. 1 show a vertical cylinder beneath the seat in front of the engine. A schematic cross-section shows it to have comprised the fuel tank sitting on the carburettor.

Early carburettors such as Benz's held the fuel in a vessel which was heated by exhaust gases to promote evaporation and counter the cooling which evaporation causes. The liquid surface was disturbed by vibration of the engine and movement of the vehicle and vaporisation of the fuel was increased further either by bubbling air through it or by directing jets of air across it. These methods created fine spray at the surface without the need to pass the fuel through a nozzle, which required pressure and might clog. Such carburettors were known as surface carburettors.

In Benz's first carburettors (to 1890) the vaporising vessel was open at the bottom (below the level of the fuel) and sat within a larger vessel to which air was admitted. By reducing the width of the annulus between them lower down, Benz forced the speed of the air flow to increase, generating small bubbles which moved fast and created the desired fine spray at the surface.

These carburettors had a sight gauge beside them in which the level of fuel in the vessel could be seen. This was needed because the level was not maintained automatically. Instead, the flow rate of fuel had to be managed to match consumption in the engine. In the carburettor shown in patent DRP37435, once cock 8 has been opened, fuel flows under gravity until the cock is closed again: flow continues even if the engine stops.

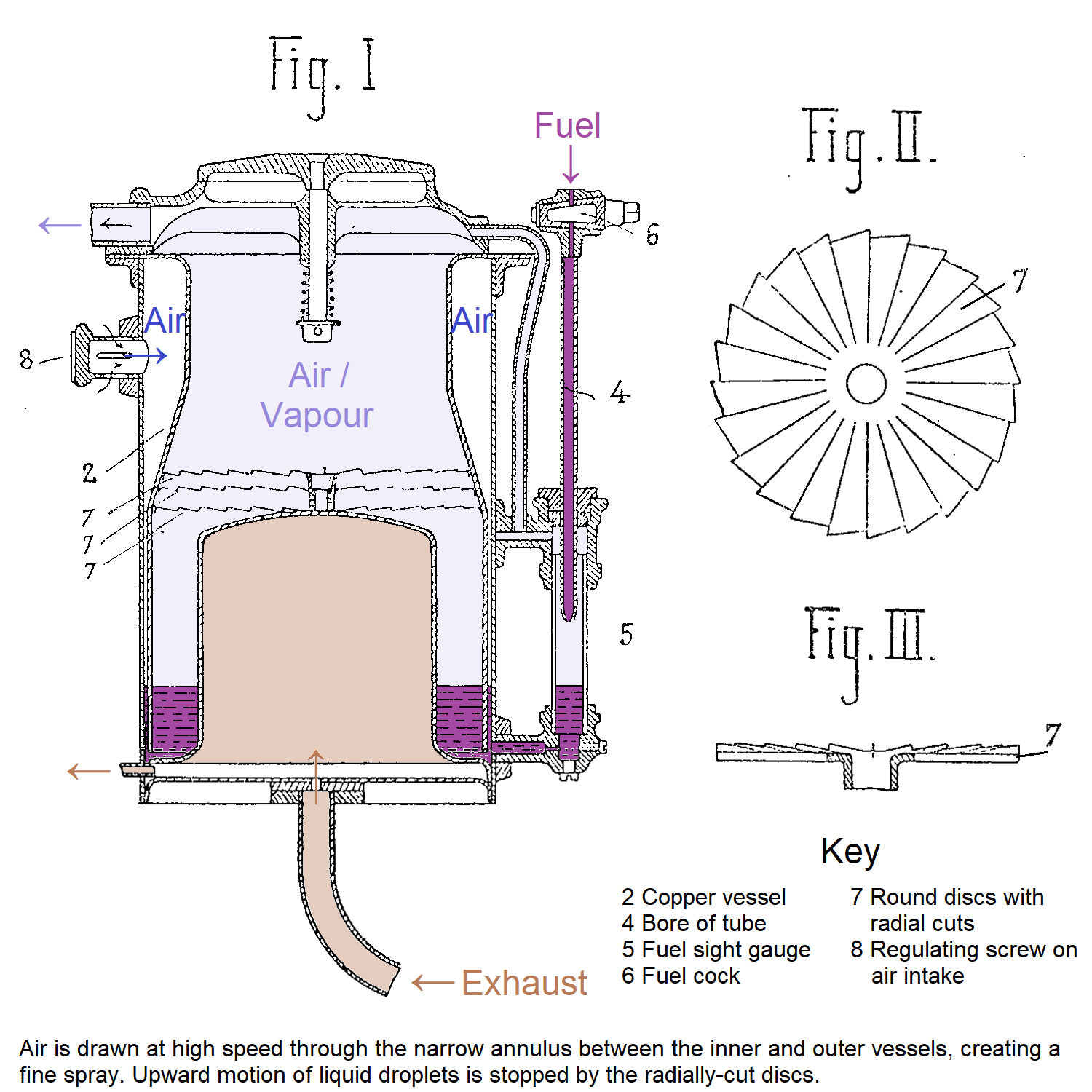
Schematic of Benz Carburettor c.1886 from Patent CH970, omitting the tank, which sat on top

The second schematic shows the carburettor from patent CH970. This matches the cross-section of the carburettor in Worby Beaumont's Motor Vehicles and Motors, which he took from the British patent 5789 of 28 April 1886 for Nr. 1. In it, exhaust enters vertically through the centre of the base of the carburettor. This configuration is shown on the engraving of Nr. 2 with Max Rose sitting beside Carl Benz. The radially-cut discs in this carburettor were shown on the 1886 British patent for Nr. 1.

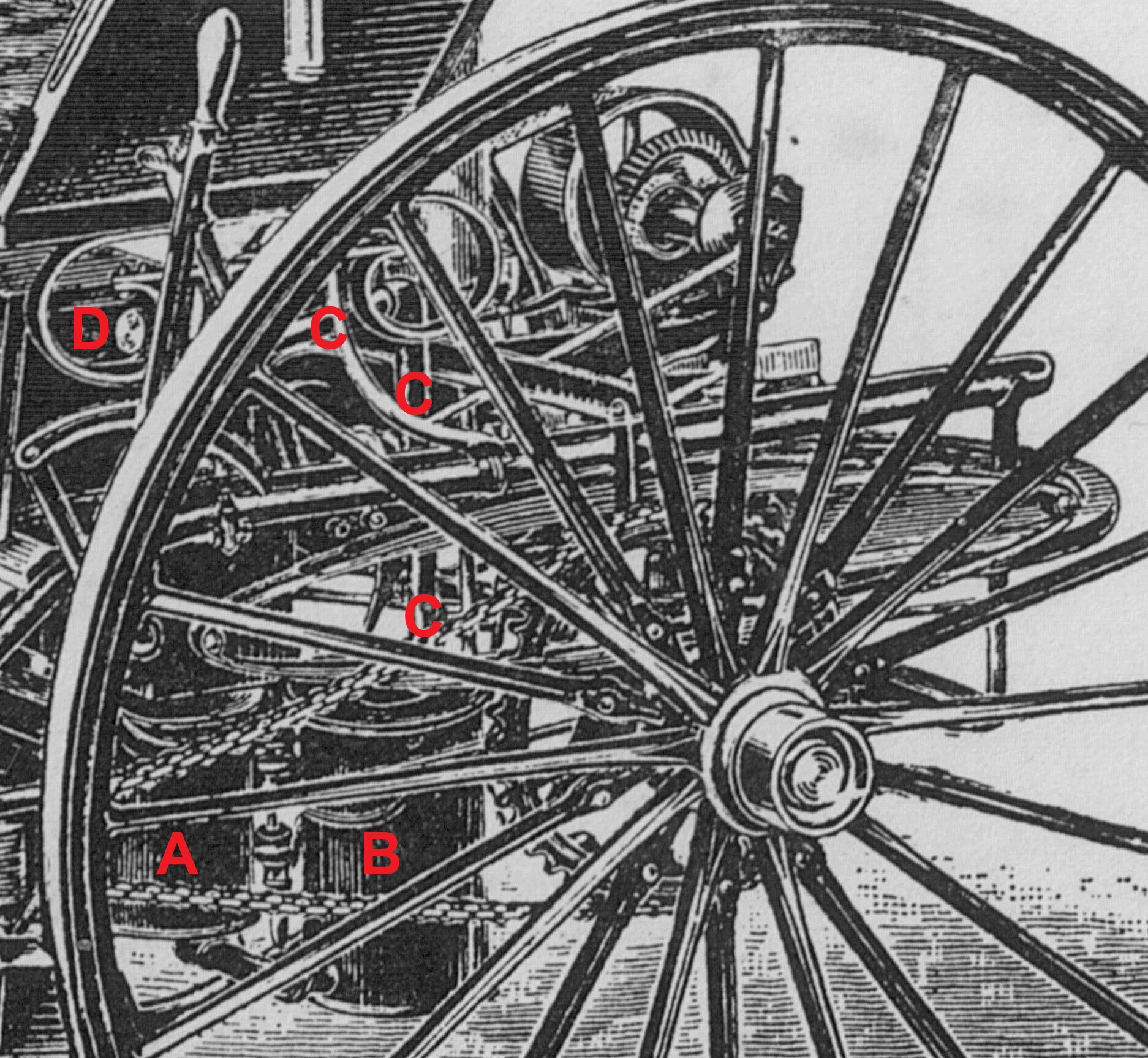
Engine of Benz Patent-Motorwagen Nr. 2 showing Silencer and Carburettor

The Model 2 in the Science Museum in London shows a similar configuration of two vertical cylinders. In it, cylinder A is rusty: evidently it has run hot and is the silencer, while cylinder B is the carburettor. This corroborates the identification of the cylinders in images of Nr. 2.

In the engravings of Nr. 2, there appears to be a squat fuel tank sitting on the carburettor. This implies that in Nr. 2 fuel flowed while the cock was open. Patent CH970 shows a mechanism to ensure that fuel only flows when the engine is running: it sends a fixed (but adjustable) amount of fuel to the carburettor for each revolution of the engine. The flow rate still had to be adjusted manually, but it was a first step towards maintaining a stable level of fuel in the carburettor. In the Science Museum's Model 2 the fuel tank is beneath the seat and there is a hollow plug valve dispensing fuel which is rotated slowly by the engine.

The float appears to have been introduced around 1890. Fig.11 of Benz's Lebensfahrt is a schematic cross-section of a Benz surface carburettor with a float. A vertical cylinder has a rounded top with an air intake, the pipe carrying the air/vapour mix to the engine and (in this case) the pipe carrying fuel, to which the float is attached. As the fuel level falls, the float falls and, with it, the rod above. This acts directly as a valve to admit fuel and then to stop the flow as the float rises again. In this carburettor there is no indication from the outside as to the level of fuel inside.

By 1893 Benz had incorporated a conventional float valve in his carburettor. It manifests itself in where the fuel line enters the carburettor: below the level of the fuel. (Note: This can be seen on the side views of Zardetti's Model 3 and the 1893 Vis-à-vis: the fuel line enters the carburettor through the centre of its base. The multiple views which are available online of the Vis-à-vis allow the course of the fuel line to be traced from the fuel tank immediately behind the rear seat.) For the siphon to work, the fuel line must be full of fuel. Benz's implementation of the float valve fixed the float to a rod which projects through a boss on the top of the carburettor. This rises and falls with the level of fuel and provides a direct read-out of the level of fuel inside.

In Zardetti's Model 3 and the early Viktoria and Vis-à-vis (i.e. 1892 – 93), the fuel enters the float-valve carburettor in the centre of the base. In the 1895 rebuild it enters at the side immediately above the false bottom (see the View from below of the 1895 rebuild). Until the float-valve carburettors, air was bubbled through the fuel from below; this included the "needle-valve" float carburettor shown in Fig 11 of Benz's Lebensfahrt. In the carburettor used on the Velo of 1896 – 99 (which matches that in the 1895 rebuild), the air was directed across the surface of the fuel. (Note: On p.23 of Mercedes-Benz Personenwagen 1886 - 1945, Werner Oswald says that the Viktoria and Vis-à-vis had Oberflächenvergaser until 1894, when Schwimmervergaser were introduced. All of Benz's carburettors until 1900 were Oberflächen, i.e. surface. The term Schwimmervergaser appears to relate to the float valve (which appeared in 1893) rather than the float.)

With all the carburettors there was a mixing valve on the intake line. The driver could reduce the richness of the air/vapour mixture from the carburettor by mixing it with additional air. In Nr. 2 the carburetted air rose in pipe C on its way to the intake valve. The knob D is in a similar position to that in the rebuilt original vehicle and its replicas which controlled this.

From Model 2 onwards (and possibly on Nr. 3), the mixer valve was controlled by a pointer which was moved across a sector at the bottom left of the seat box. The richness of the fuel/air mixture continued to be controlled in this way until a throttle knob was added c.1895. (Note: The throttle knob in the Benz "Ideal" of 1898-99 was positioned very similarly to that in the reassembled original vehicle.)

=== Coolant system ===
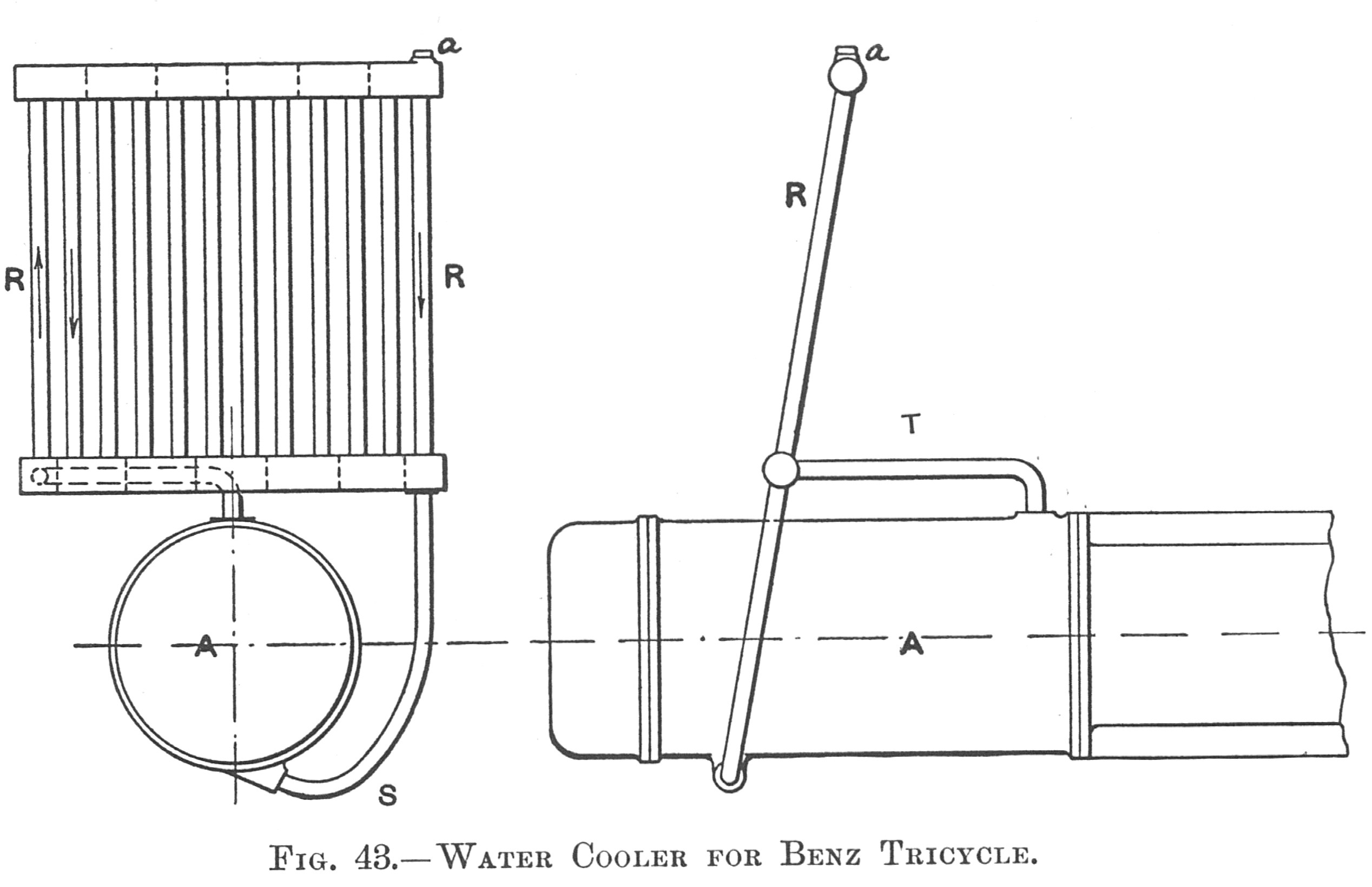
Coolant system of Nr. 1 from Patent DRP 37435

The patent drawings show a form of radiator above the cylinder with flow into it from what is now the drip-oil lubrication port at the top rear of the cylinder. The return flow is shown into the underside of the cylinder, near the cylinder head.

The radiator shown would have held a small volume of water and it had a hole (a on the left half of the diagram) at the top for steam to escape. Early radiators, including all Benz radiators before 1900 used "evaporative cooling": this meant that cooling was primarily by the extraction of the latent heat of vaporisation of water as it boils. In his 1894 journey in a Benz Viktoria (3 hp engine), Theodor von Liebieg recorded water consumption up to 150 litres / 100 km = 2 mpg (fuel consumption was a more modest 21 litres / 100 km = 14 mpg). Boiling of the coolant water would have limited the distance Nr. 1 could travel before more water needed to be added.

Through successive iterations of Patent-Motorwagen, the volume of coolant water increased. Model 2's coolant water tank was larger than Nr. 2's and as water boiled away, it was replaced by cold water from a tank beneath the seat. In Model 3, Benz added two substantial copper water tanks/radiators, one at each side of the engine. These are connected to the vessel above the cylinder. After 1895 a condenser (designed and patented by Émile Roger) was added, to reduce water consumption (a schematic cross-section is at Fig.13 of Benz's Lebensfahrt). Despite this, Worby Beamont comments:

On starting the motor, the tanks [labeled] W will be nearly full. . . After the motor has been working for a short time, the water in the jackets and the vessel [immediately above the cylinder] will begin to boil. . . This action will continue until a considerable part of the water is boiled away, when the tanks W must be refilled.

Wilhelm Maybach essentially solved this problem with his patents from 1897 onwards to improve the heat transfer from the radiator, thereby avoiding the need for evaporative cooling and allowing the cooling system to be closed.

The patent drawings for Nr. 1 show two ports to the water jacket for the coolant system: on the top at the end remote from the cylinder head; and on the bottom next to the cylinder head. A new hole on the top of the cylinder would have been required when the first coolant water tank replaced the radiator in the patent drawings. There are signs that it wasn't part of the casting; other changes also appear to have been made to the cylinder in the transition from Nr. 1 to Nr. 2 (see the section Rebuild of the original vehicle).

=== Bore and Stroke ===
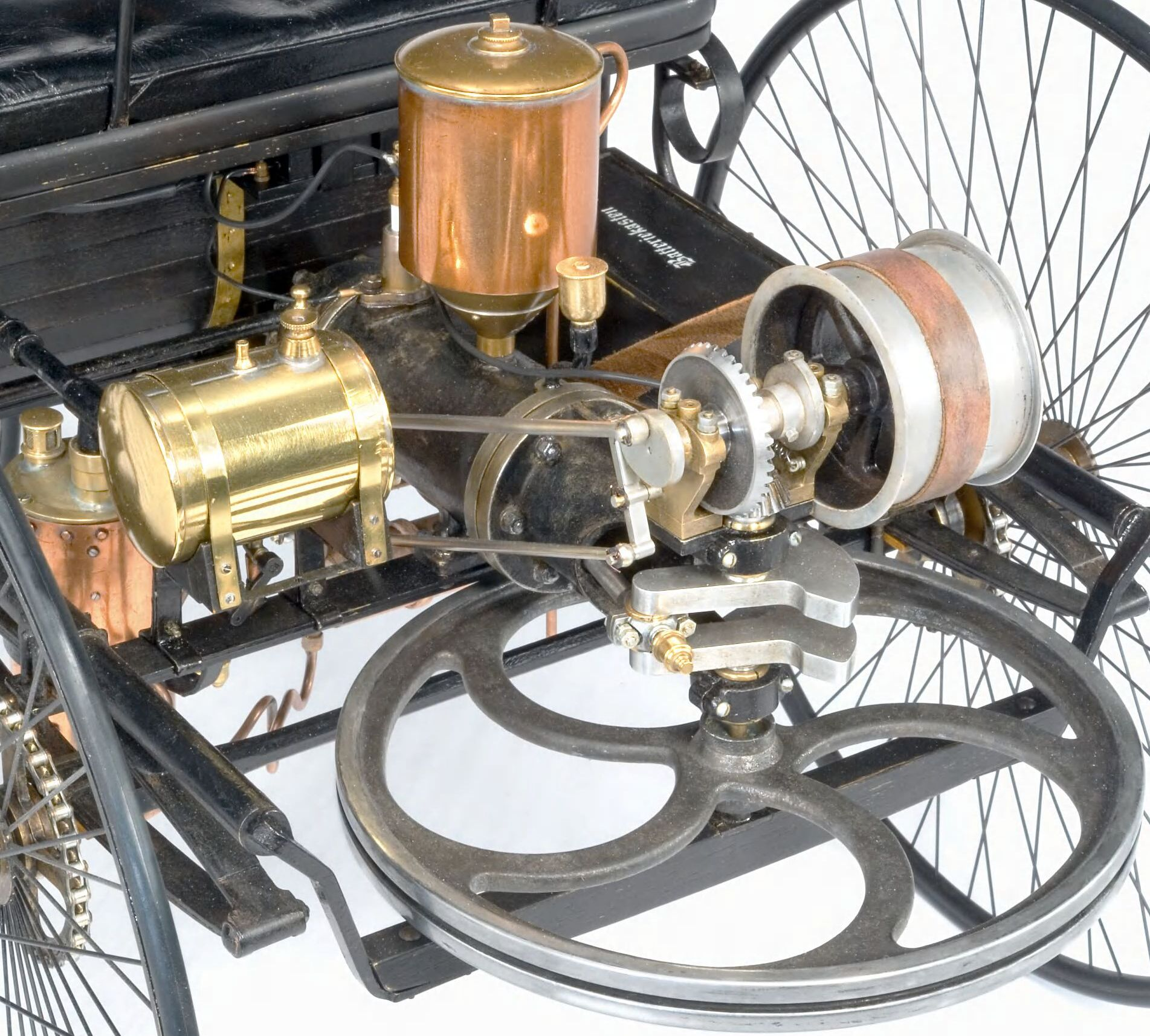
Engine of the 1895 rebuild of Nr. 1 in Deutsches Museum

The bore x stroke of the cylinder in the vehicle in the Deutsches Museum is 90 x 150. It seems likely that this cylinder, cylinder head and cylinder extension are indeed the ones salvaged from the original vehicle in 1887 and subsequently used in a stationary engine.

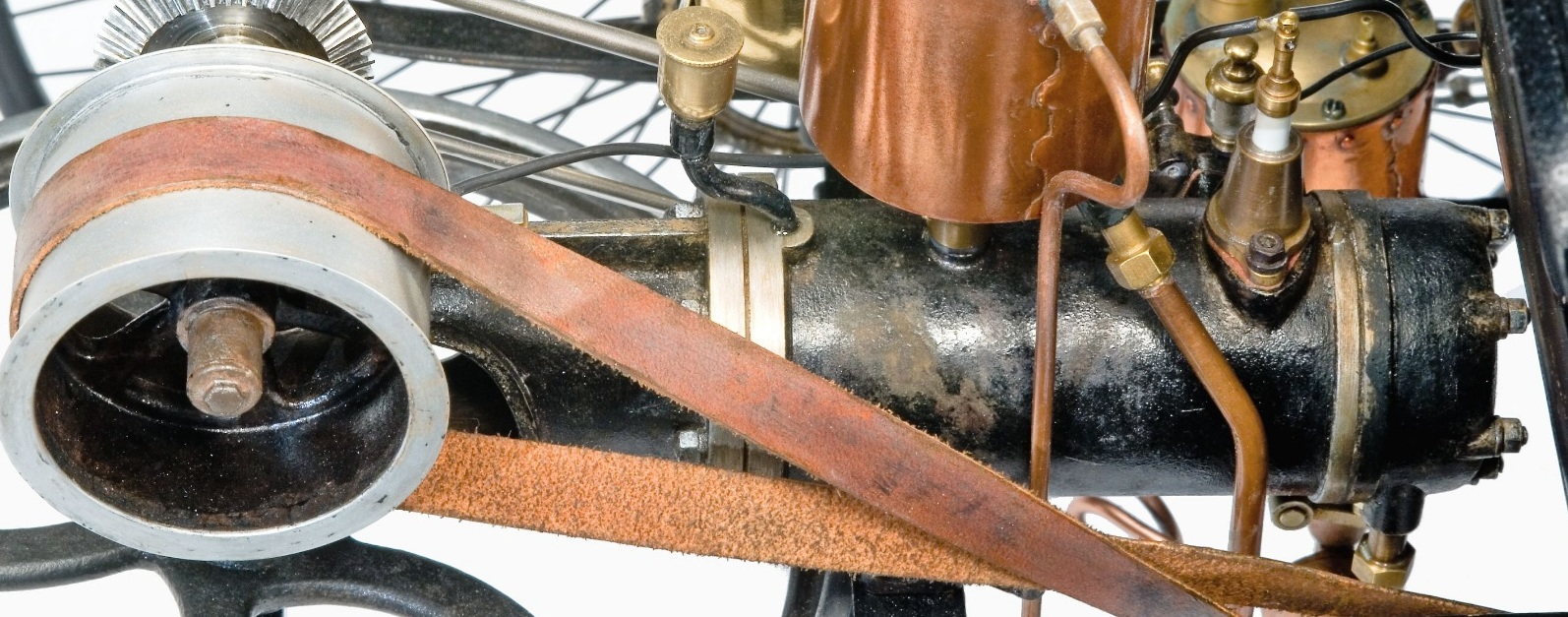
View from above right of cylinder of the 1895 rebuild in Deutsches Museum

Their appearance today suggests, however, that they were modified during the development of the original vehicle. The cylinder is similar to that in the patent drawings but the flanges between the cylinder and the cylinder extension are wider and twice as high as those between the cylinder and the cylinder head. On the patent drawings both sets of flanges are the same size (as would be expected) and their width and height match those between the cylinder and cylinder head. This suggests that those flanges (and therefore the adjacent components) are original while the other flanges are later. (Note: While it would be unusual to change the flange on a casting, this may reflect the constraints Benz was working under in seeking to avoid unnecessary expenditure.)

The most likely time for this is when the cylinder was installed in Nr. 2, which was heavier than Nr. 1. At the same time, the bevel gears from the crankshaft to the driveshaft were changed from 2:1 to 1:1 (Note: The 1:1 bevel gears can be seen on the photo of the rear of the Science Museum's Model 2. The driveshaft bevel gear can be seen on the engraving of Nr. 2 in Worby Beaumont. It looks the same. The camshaft lies forward of the axis of the driveshaft, as on Model 2, with 2:1 spur gearing.)

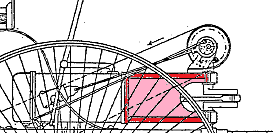
Excerpt from patent DRP37435, showing cylinder extension

The "cut-out" for the motion of the connecting rod on the patent drawing is smaller than that in the rebuilt original vehicle (and its replicas). The only reasons to increase the "cut-out" are for larger cranks or to increase the stroke. At 1.67, the stroke / bore ratio is high: surviving examples of Models 2 and 3 have ratios between 1 and 1.39. Model 2 was the next cylinder Benz made; in its earliest version, the cylinder was square, with bore and stroke of 11 cm. He is unlikely to have done this unless he preferred it (later cylinders in the Viktoria were 130 x 130 and 150 x 150). The implication is that Benz's original cylinder (in Nr. 1) was also square, with bore and stroke of 9 cm.

Oswald records three bore / stroke combinations for Models 2 and 3: 110 x 110; 115 x 160; and 130 x 150. It seems likely that 115 x 160 was achieved by boring out the 110 x 110 casting a bit more and increasing the stroke. This increased the power of the engine from 1.5 hp to 2.5 hp, possibly in response to Bertha's difficulties going up hills on her trip to Pforzheim. The Science Museum's Model 2 has this 115 x 160 engine.

=== Assessment ===
The engine of the rebuilt original vehicle is a four-stroke engine with trembler coil ignition. When tested, it produced 0.68 PS (500 W; 2/3 hp) at 250 rpm, although later tests by the University of Mannheim showed it to be capable of 0.91 PS (670 W; 0.9 hp) at 400 rpm. These details are shown in the Infobox. Technical details of the Model 2 and Model 3 are shown immediately before the section Patent-Motorwagen Model 2.

It was an extremely light engine for the period, weighing about 100 kg (220 lb). Although its cylinder extension and drip oiling system are alien to a modern mechanic, its use of a pushrod-operated poppet valve for exhaust is quite familiar. A large flywheel (horizontal until changed to vertical for the twin-belt Model 3) stabilized the single-cylinder engine's power output.

== Patent Drawings CH960A ==
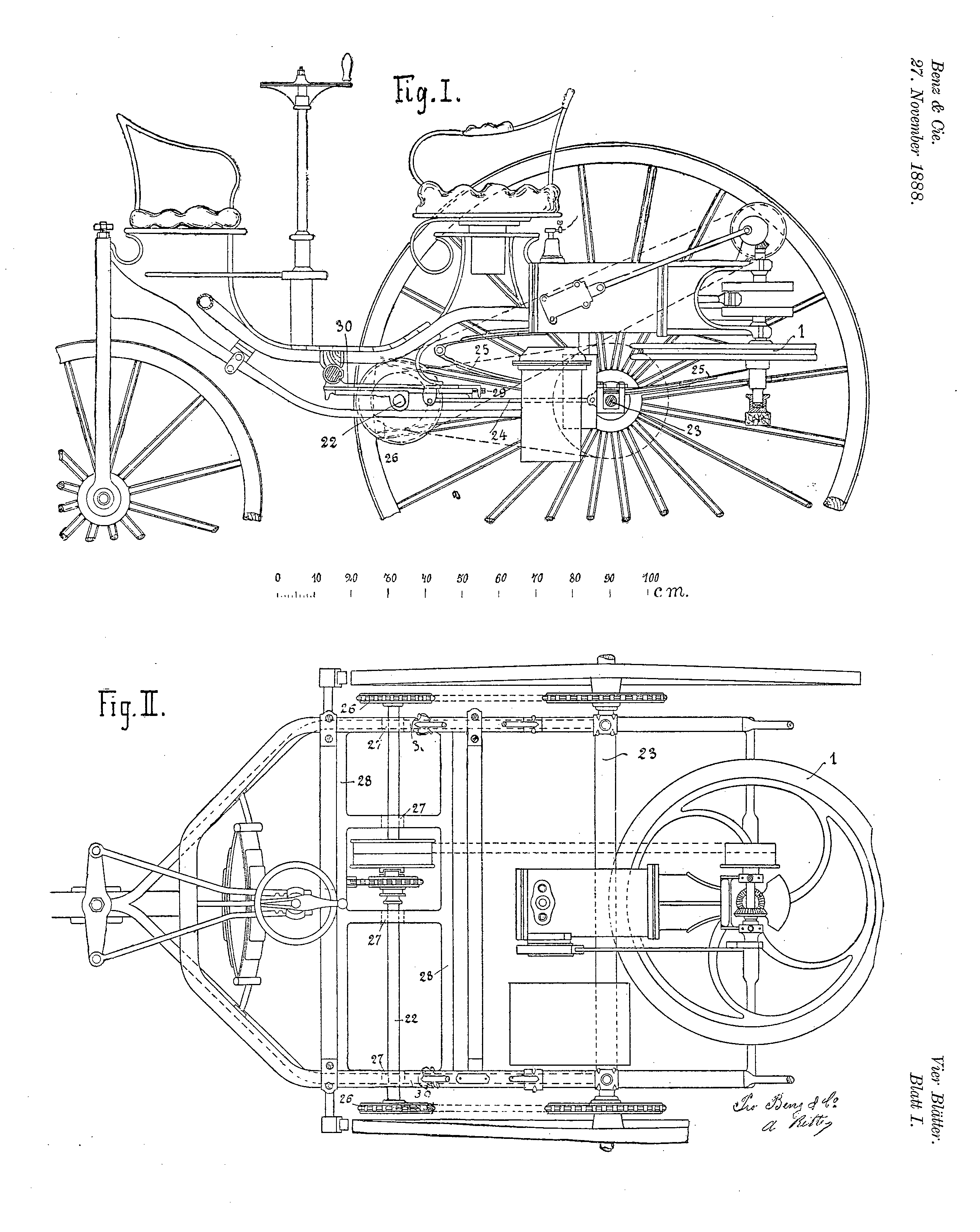
Side View (Fig. I) and Plan (Fig. II) from Patent CH960A

There is a second set of patent drawings, CH960A, which shed light on Benz's development of the Patent-Motorwagen. They show a vehicle which has moved on from Nr. 1:

- the wheels are wooden rather than wire;
- the engine has been moved forward so that the flywheel hardly projects behind the rear wheel;
- all the controls can be reached by a driver sitting on the left.

It appears to be intermediate between Nr. 2 and Model 2:

- its wheelbase is that of Nr. 2: Model 2's was longer, allowing for a larger rear-facing front seat and more space between the seats;
- the drawings are ambivalent as to whether there is front suspension (Fig. II) or not (Fig. I);
- in Fig I (no front suspension), the only possible springing for the seats are the scroll supports, which copy Nr. 2 and were presumably spring steel.

Despite this, there are some features of Fig. I which suggest that it, at least, is from between Nr. 1 and Nr. 2. It shows metal frames for the arm rests and the back of the seat, as on the 1895 rebuild, rather than the wooden seat used in Nr. 2. There is a single stalk for the steering (as on patent DRP37435 and the 1895 rebuild) without a second stalk for the clutch of the reduction gearbox, which is not shown at all (although it is on Fig. III). The supports for the seat match those in Nr. 2. As seat within a wooden box is shown in all images of Nr. 2, this suggests that Fig. I antedates those images, i.e. it was drawn after the drawings of patent DRP37435 had been prepared (late 1885) and before the first public outing of Nr. 2 (early summer 1886).

Fig. I has a scale, which indicates that the rear wheels were to be 1400mm diameter, compared to the 1260mm of Nr. 2 and subsequent Patent-Motorwagen. The cylinder of the engine, the cylinder head and the cylinder extension were to be new, with the bore probably 110mm.

Patent CH960A contains cross-sectional drawings and explanations of how the vehicle worked. This patent, and a parallel one for the carburettor, CH970A, inform the description and analysis of Nr. 2 and subsequent Patent-Motorwagen.

The other pages of patent drawings for CH960A are:

- Fig III: side view of controls and counter-shaft
- Figs IV and V: section and plan of transmission at counter-shaft
- Figs VI – VIII: side, rear and top views of the steering

The patent application CH970A for the carburettor shows exhaust entering the centre of the base. It does this on the engraving of Nr. 2 with Max Rose sitting beside Carl Benz, on Nr.3 and on the Science Museum's Model 2. On the Worby Beaumont engraving of Nr. 2, exhaust enters the side of the false bottom of the carburettor. It does this in DRP37435, which suggests that the Worby Beaumont engraving of Nr. 2 is earlier than that showing Max Rose next to Carl Benz.

== The Pivot Year: 1890 ==
This section is based on the biography of Benz in David Scott-Moncrieff's book Three-pointed Star (1955). A secondary author of the book was St.John Nixon, who had written The Invention of the Automobile (1936). Scott-Moncrieff corrects obvious mistakes in Nixon's book (Nixon refers to the business as a partnership rather than a company, for instance) and so is preferred as a source where the two differ.

In his foreword, Scott-Moncrieff acknowledges the readiness with which Daimler-Benz had given all the assistance asked of them. The story which Scott-Moncrieff tells about the withdrawal of two directors of Benz & Cie in 1890 and their replacement cross-checks against Mercedes-Benz records but adds why the directors withdrew. Scott-Moncrieff's story appears credible and is consistent with Benz's Lebensfahrt (which is elliptical on such matters, and on dates and sales numbers generally). Scott-Moncrieff writes authoritatively, so he (or Nixon) may have had access to the minutes of board meetings of Benz & Cie. Alternatively, they may have picked up what had gone on through the grapevine of the London motoring clubs, of which Julius Gauss (Note: Julius Ganss is recorded in the Automotor Year Book of 1900 as being a member of the [later Royal] Automobile Club in London.) had been a member.

At his marriage in July 1872, Benz was working with August Ritter as Benz & Ritter; Mechanische Werkstätte (Mechnical Workshops). Business was insufficient to support both partners, so Benz bought Ritter out using money from his wife's dowry. Benz struggled through the 1870s but was able to spend time developing his first two-stroke gas engine. By the end of 1880, he was beginning to sell this engine and in 1881 the Mannheim commercial register described his business as the Mannheimer Gasmotorenfabrik (Mannheim Gas Engine Factory). A bad contract with an agent for the sale of his engines led ultimately to Benz withdrawing from the business in 1883 and losing the rights to the engine he had developed.

While this decade of work had been commercially unsuccessful, Benz had acquired a reputation as a capable engineer. Max Rose, a Mannheim merchant, now came to his rescue. Along with his colleague, Friedrich Esslinger, he offered to finance a new company, Benz & Cie; Rheinische Gasmotorenfabrik (Rhenish Gas Engine Factory) of Mannheim. Rose made clear that he was not interested in Benz's ideas for developing a horseless carriage, but that, so long as development and manufacture of stationary gas engines took precedence, Benz could, within limits, pursue his dream. Rose and Esslinger took 95% of the shares and subsequently injected further funds, leaving Benz free of financial worries. Benz pursued his dream of a horseless carriage outside working hours: on Sundays, before work in the morning and after work in the evening.

As the stationary engine business began to prosper and Benz's activities with the horseless carriage started to bear fruit, Benz started to push against the limits which Rose had set. His vehicle won medals at exhibitions and plaudits in the press, but sales were scant.

According to Scott-Moncrieff:

In 1889 he exhibited at the World's Fair in Paris, but with practically no success. . . The two co-directors of Benz [Rose and Esslinger] were dissatisfied with the amount of time and money being spent on the development of motor-cars, and they refused to sanction any further expenditure. After some stormy scenes, [in May 1890] the two sceptical directors withdrew and once again, Karl Benz had a remarkable stroke of good fortune. Two men of ability and foresight, F[riedrich] von Fischer and Julius Gauss, offered to support Benz financially. Although the business was still mortgaged to the late directors, good progress was made and Karl Benz was given a free hand in connexion with automobile development, von Fischer supervising the internal administration, and Julius Gauss the sales . . . Julius Gauss proved himself to be a very capable salesman; indeed he appears to have been one of those rare individuals who could sell anything . . . Benz, on the other hand, was essentially an inventor, an engineer and a technician, with but little gifts for administration and none at all for common salesmanship, but with Fischer and Gauss at the helm, the business made sound progress.

Rose and Esslinger were replaced by von Fischer and Gauss at a single board meeting. This was an amicable hand-over from one pair of investor directors to another. At their parting, Rose told Benz that he should concentrate on the stationary gas engines and have nothing more to do with automobiles.

After 1890 the company focused on producing petrol stationary engines, which found a ready market where town gas was not available. Benz was finally able to spend time developing two-wheel steering, getting his first four-wheel vehicle on the road in 1892. At the same time, the market for cars was segmented. Hitherto, the company had produced the 1460mm-wide Patent-Motorwagen, which was priced at 3000 Marks.

The first four-wheeled cars, the Viktoria and the Vis-à-vis, introduced in late 1892 were 1600mm wide and priced from 4000 marks. The Velo, introduced in 1894, was 1250mm wide, used cycle-type wire wheels and cost 2000 marks. The names of these vehicles were descriptive: Viktoria is a type of carriage (named after Queen Victoria), while Velo was a contracted form of the original name, Velociped, one of the German spellings of velocipede. Vis-à-vis is a generic term for carriages with face-to-face seating, while later models before 1900 included Phaeton and Milord.

== Sales Numbers ==
The number of Patent-Motorwagen sold is obscure. One data point is that the Model 3 delivered to Eugen Zardetti in February 1893 was Fabrikationsnummer 24. That may be considered the end of production of the Patent-Motorwagen: the first Viktorias were produced and sold in late 1892, along with the Vis-à-vis. By the end of 1893, the Fabrikationsnummern had increased to 69 and the Viktoria delivered to Theodor von Liebieg by rail in Spring 1894 was number 76. Sales of the Velo are reported to have begun in April 1894 and soon dominated production.

In his Lebensfahrt, Benz hints at how difficult it was to sell his car in the years after 1886. After describing the achievements of 1885 and 1886, he writes:

So I had risen . . . from the first stage of every invention: from thinking, thinking, drawing, and calculating to the second stage, to practical execution and realisation, to action! Now that I thought I was at the height . . . I realized that I was standing . . . at the very bottom, and had to knock like a beggar at the doors of humanity and its culture. . . This was the third and last stage of invention, that dangerous stage at which many a great inventor has collapsed in despair . . . Just one example [of the challenges I faced:] Dr. G. van Muyden, librarian of the Imperial Patent Office in Berlin [wrote in 1889]: "Benz also built a gasoline car, which caused a sensation at the Munich exhibition. This application of the gasoline engine, however, is no more likely to be promising than that of steam to the movement of road carts."

Successive chapters of the Lebensfahrt set out what happened in various countries. The first buyers were from France and the USA. The sale to Émile Roger in 1887 is described and then Roger's sale to Émile Levassor in early 1888 and Roger's appointment as his exclusive agent for sales of his cars in France. He then talks about demand for his cars in France becoming so great that the factory has to be expanded. This did not occur until after 1893, in the years of the Benz Velo. There are no specifics about what happened in the USA; elsewhere there are references to the World's Columbian Exposition in 1893 and to the Chicago Times-Herald Race of 1895, so, again mid-1890s.

At the end of this chapter, Benz talks about England, where sales were suppressed by the Locomotive Acts until 1896. He says that in practice the barriers to sales in Germany were just as high: for many years he made no sales in Germany Later, he talks about his own experiences driving around Germany, where people shouted "witch's cart" at his vehicle. He then says that his first customers had similar experiences, citing one who had bought a Viktoria, so late 1892 at the earliest.

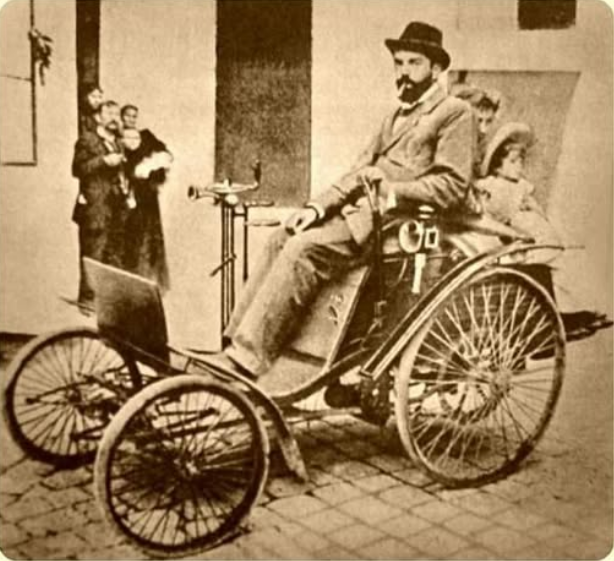
Béla Hatschek in Budapest in his Benz Velo. His children were born in 1892 and 1895, so this photo is from 1897 or 1898.

There are then two chapters, about his patented two-wheel steering and handling on country roads, before Benz returns to discussing sales with a chapter titled "The first sales in Germany, Hungary and Bohemia". He perfected his two-wheel steering in 1892 and sold cars with it during that year (one of the testimonials in an 1893 brochure refers to the delivery of a four-seat car in October 1892; the three-wheeled Model 3's had at most three seats). This sequencing of chapters suggests that sales in Germany and Austria-Hungary started around 1892.

Benz starts his chapter about sales in Germany, Hungary and Bohemia with a story about his first sale in Germany being to a man whose father demanded that the transaction be reversed because the buyer was mentally ill. The next buyer wanted a car "before I die", but lived many years. Then comes (without her name) Róza Kalocsa from Sommerein (Note: see Single-speed version in the section Patent-Motorwagen Model 3) and (with his name) Theodor von Liebieg of Reichenberg (now Liberec), who placed his order on 31 October 1893. This is all consistent with sales in these markets having started around 1892.

The 1893 brochure includes testimonials from 12 people who had bought cars from Benz & Cie, 9 from within post-1871 Germany (including Richard Freudenburg of Süchteln, who later claimed to have bought his car in 1890) and 3 from Austria-Hungary: Julius Jalowetz of Vienna, whose first journey in his car was reported in the Neuen Wiener Abendblatt of 3 November 1892; Béla Hatschek in Budapest, who obtained a permit for his car on 26 November 1892; and Róza Kalocsa. All these testimonials are from between 29 January and 7 February 1893, so before Zardetti's car was delivered to him.

When Zardetti's car was delivered, legend had it that Carl Benz accompanied it and showed Zardetti how to drive. Zardetti's motoring diary records that the car was transported by train to Constance, accompanied by 18-year-old mechanic Matthias Bender, who drove Zardetti to Bregenz and stayed a week, teaching Zardetti a couple of hours a day.

In Mercedes-Benz: Personenwagen 1886-1945 (1985), Werner Oswald, with access to Mercedes-Benz's records, gives statistics of the numbers of vehicles sold by Benz & Cie from 1886 – 1900, broken down by country. However, while data are specified for each individual year after 1893, the data are aggregated for the years 1886 – 1893. Oswald states that about 25 three-wheel Patent-Motorwagen were manufactured (not sold).

In the light of the qualititative history of sales set out above, it is possible to draw up an illustrative disaggregation of Oswald's data by year. The principles which have been used are that sales within each market (except England) rise in arithmetic progression from the year that sales begin; and that the numbers should be consistent with other data (such as the testimonials in the 1893 sales brochure and the number of sales in each market in 1894): (Note: The 1893 brochure had 12 testimonials, 9 from post-1871 Germany and 3 from Austria-Hungary. All of these were delivered before the end of 1892. Not all purchasers would have supplied testimonials, so sales in Germany to the end of 1892 might have been between 10 and 20. Oswald has 15 sales in Germany to the end of 1893, which looks inconsistent.)

Illustrative Disaggregation of Sales 1888 – 1894
	1888	1889	1890	1891	1892	1893	1894
	Model 2		Model 3			Viktoria	+ Velo
Germany				4	5	6	34
France	2	4	6	8	10	12	25
England		1					
Others					5	6	8
Total	2	5	6	12	20	24	67

As a rough-and-ready approximation, sales in 1886 – 1889 are identified as being of Model 2 and in 1890 – 1892 as Model 3. Sales in 1893 are considered to be of the Viktoria and Vis-à-vis, while in 1894 the Velo was added. They suggest that Émile Roger sold around 7 Model 2's (including the one to England) and around 24 Model 3's. Benz & Cie's sales were all of Model 3 and were 9 in Germany and 5 elsewhere.

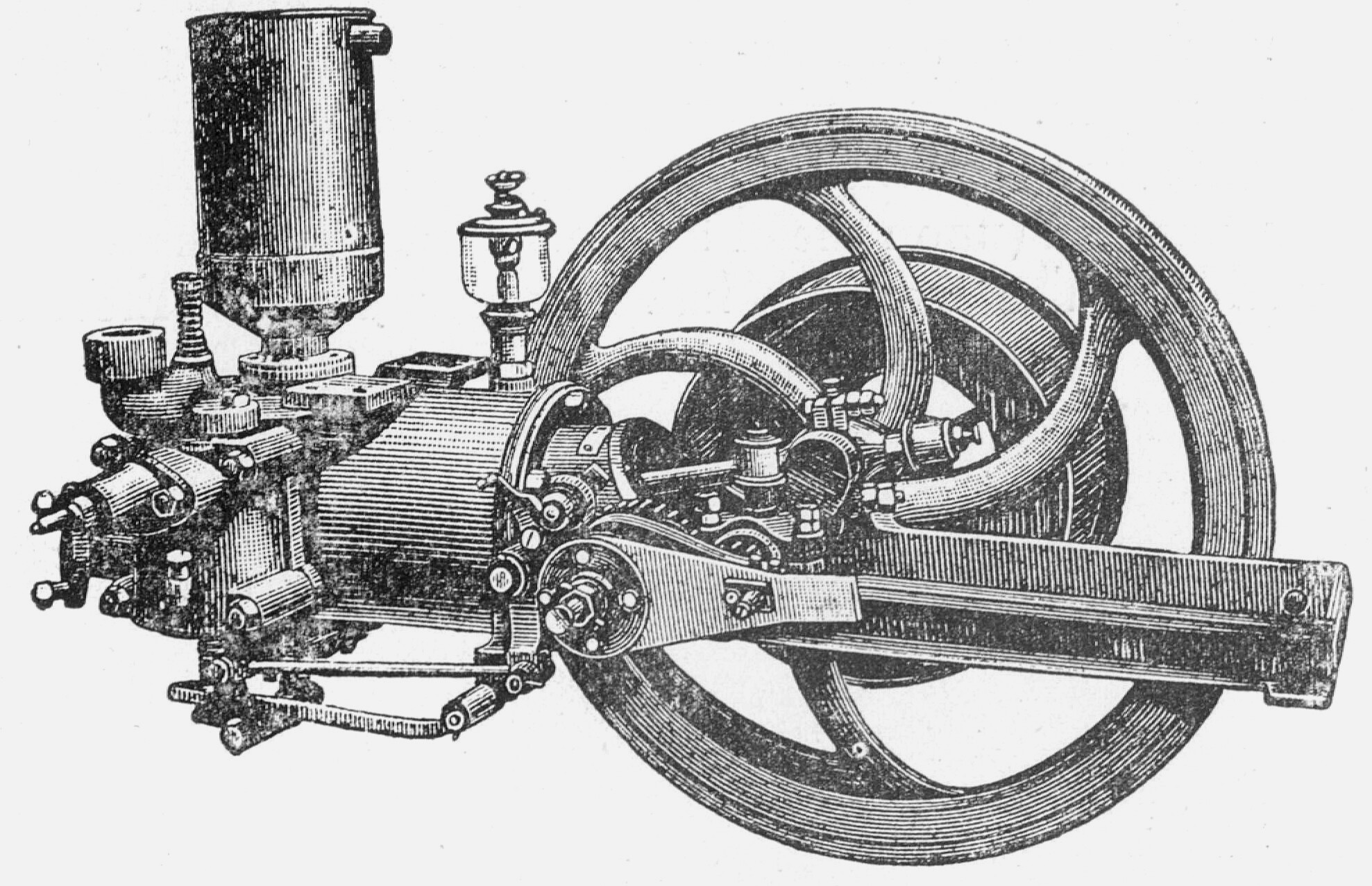
Engine of Benz Velo sold loose in the mid-1890s. It included the flywheel and belt drive pulley but not the carburettor.

These numbers suggest that Mannheim gave Fabrikationsnummern to vehicles which they were selling but not to those produced for sale by Émile Roger. Roger was reported to have been importing "loose engines" from Mannheim in the mid-1890s. According to T.R.Nicholson, "Roger's operation amounted to no more than assembly and marketing". It seems likely that the 3-wheelers were manufactured completely in Mannheim before being disassembled sufficiently to qualify on entry to France as the import of parts. (Note: One part of French manufacture in the Model 2 in the Science Museum in London is the spark plug (object 1913-493/59).)

== Rebuild of Patent-Motorwagen Nr. 1 ==
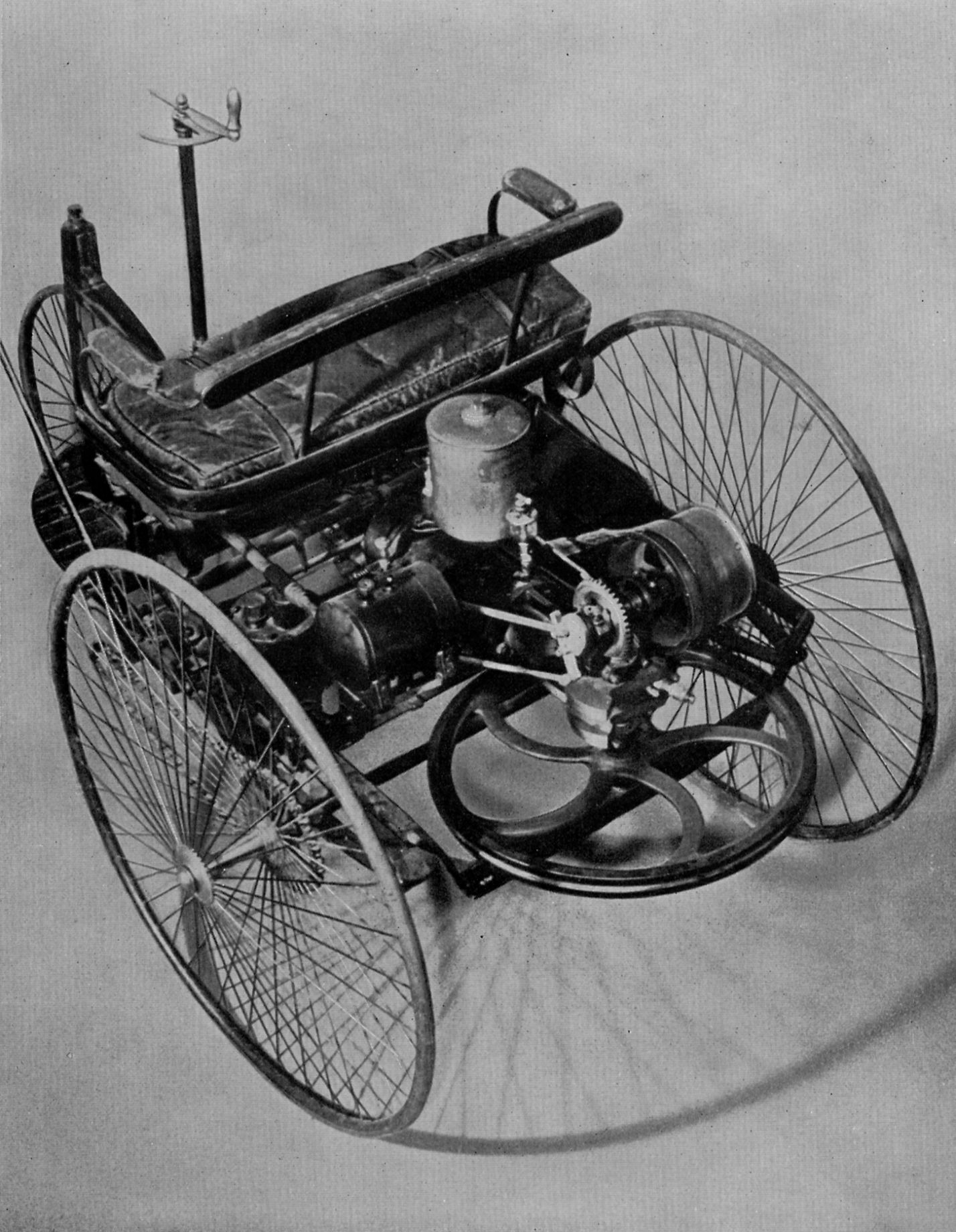
View of the 1895 rebuild of Patent-Motorwagen Nr. 1 in Deutsches Museum, 1925

Around 1895, the Sales Manager at Benz had the parts of the original vehicle sought out with a view to their reassembly. It seems likely that the engine cylinder and associated parts were indeed recovered from the factory, where they had served in a stationary engine. The flywheel may also have been original or part of a batch produced in 1885, before Benz had abandoned a dynamo as the source of electric current for the ignition.

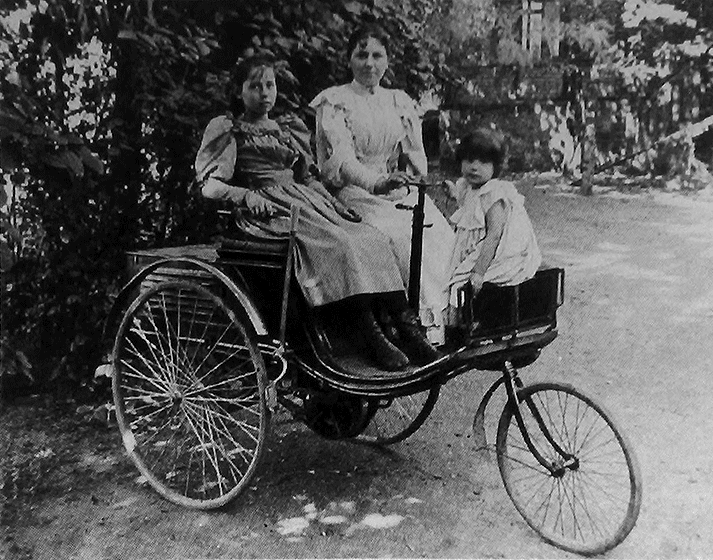
3-wheeled prototype from 1892 of the Benz Velo with the Benz daughters aboard. The youngest child, Ellen was born in 1890.

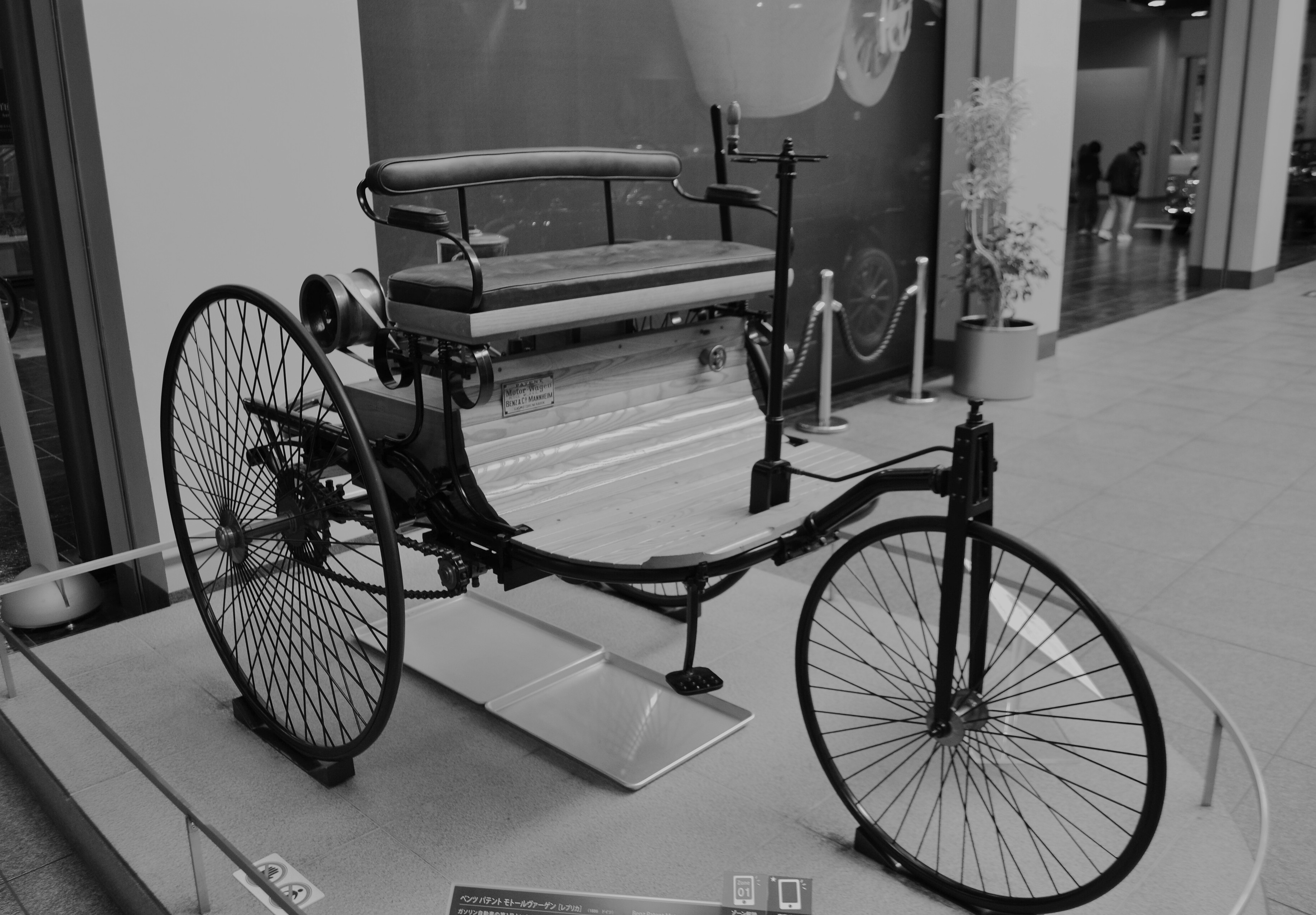
Replica in Toyota Automobile Museum of 1895 rebuild of Patent-Motorwagen Nr. 1, 2022

In 1895 Benz & Cie were producing both the full-size vehicles such as the Viktoria and the Vis-à-vis, which cost upwards of 4,000 marks; and the small, lightweight Velo, which cost 2,000 marks. The Velo represented a reversion to Benz's original concept of a motorised velocipede. Its prototype had had three wheels and bore a striking resemblance to the rebuilt vehicle.

What was produced appears to have been based on the final form of Nr. 1, probably from early 1886. But it was not an exact copy: the technology of carburettors had advanced enormously over ten years and going back would have made it as hard to use as the original. The height of the platform above ground – 60 cm – may also have been lowered from an original 80 cm.

=== Date of technology in the 1895 rebuild ===
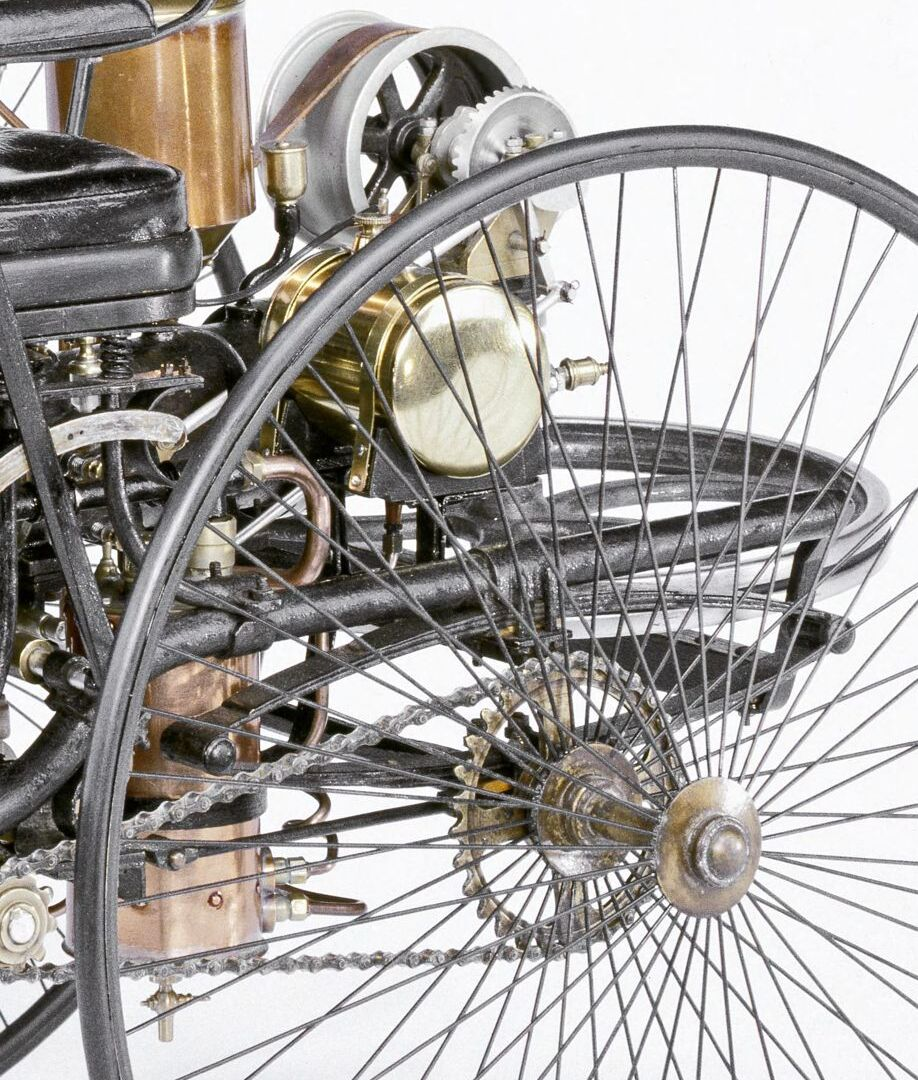
Side View of the 1895 rebuild showing carburettor (vertical copper cylinder with brass top)

There are several features of the 1895 rebuild which are either manifestly from the mid-1890s or which do not conform to Benz's observed practice in the mid-1880s:

- the carburettor is an up-to-date one from the Benz Velo with a fuel tank some way away;
- the sight gauge is off the fuel line rather than on it and has been placed so that it cannot be read;
- the belt is crossed.

The carburettor of the 1895 rebuild matches that in Fig.164 of Baudry de Saunier's L'Automobile: Théorique et Pratique (1899). This is the carburettor from the mid-1890s which was being used in 1899 on the Benz Velo. It has a ballcock-type float valve, which Benz only introduced c.1893. (Note: Benz introduced the float c.1890 (see Fig 11 of Benz's Lebensfahrt) but this did not use a conventional ballcock in which the fluid is supplied from below (operating as a siphon). The carburettors on his cars of 1893 are supplied with fuel from below, so can be inferred to have float valves.) How it worked is explained on pp.321-324 of Baudry de Saunier's book. (Note: A less-full explanation in English is at p.124 of Worby Beaumont: Motor Vehicles and Motors (1900), https://babel.hathitrust.org/cgi/pt?id=mdp.39015074997886&seq=146, with an image, Fig. 91 at p. 128) The carburettors on patent DRP37435 (Nr. 1) and GB5789 (Nr. 2) were much more primitive and had the fuel tank sitting on them; see the section Carburettor and Exhaust System.

Until Benz incorporated a float valve in his carburettors (c.1890), they had a sight gauge on the fuel line. This was needed to be able to monitor the level of fuel. Once the fuel level was controlled by a float, a sight gauge was no longer needed. In his implementation of the ballcock float valve, Benz fixed a vertical rod to the top of the float which projects through the top of the carburettor. This rod goes up and down with the float and provides a direct read-out of the level of fuel in the carburettor. It can just be made out on the top of the carburettor of the 1895 vehicle on this photograph of it from the late 1890s (Note: The bottom of the carburettor can be seen behind the front sprocket of the chain drive to the left wheel. Above the carburettor is a horizontal pipe which forms the top of a T with a vertical pipe descending to the carburettor; this lies slightly to the right of the fuel drain pipe beneath the carburettor. The float rod lies to the left of the vertical pipe and beneath the horizontal pipe, between the two curved tubes which support the seat.)

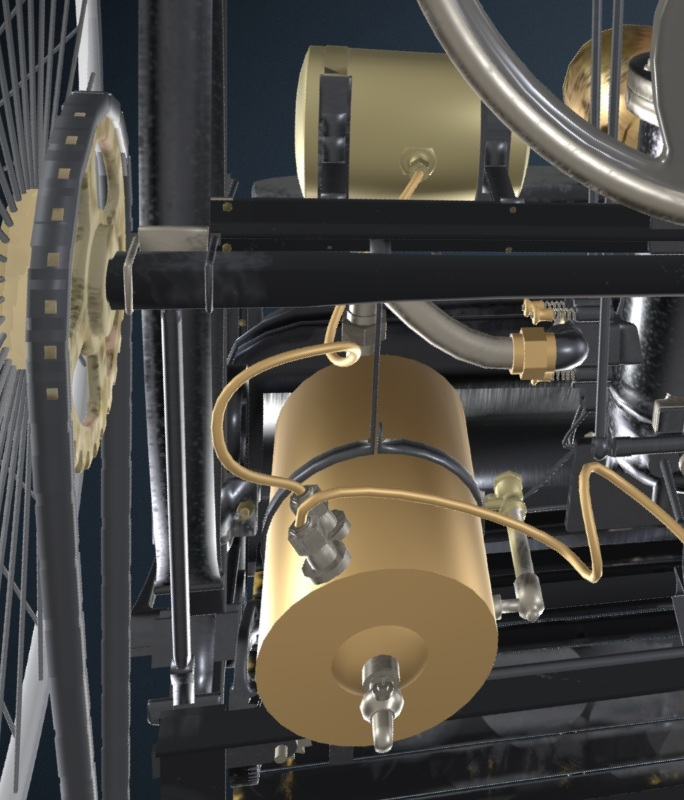
View from below of 3D model of the 1895 rebuild showing carburettor with sight gauge to its right. The fuel feed is immediately above the exhaust feed into the false bottom

A sight gauge was included in the 1895 vehicle, but it lies off the fuel line (it must do so as the fuel enters from below, and the fuel line must be full of liquid for it to work as a siphon). As the carburettor has the float rod, which shows the fuel level, the sight gauge is redundant.

On the 1895 rebuild the sight gauge has been placed between the carburettor and the centre-line, as on Nr. 2 and Model 2. (Note: While it might seem more natural to place the sight gauge outside the carburettor, this would expose it to stones thrown up by the wheels. As it has inflammable fuel flowing through breakable glass, the primary requirement is mechanical protection, which the carburettor provides if the sight gauge is placed on its inside. The secondary requirement for visibility is met by leaving plenty of space in front of the carburettor.) The images of these vehicles show that the sight gauge could readily be seen from the left side. It cannot be seen from a comparable position on the rebuild (hence the view from below from the 3D model). This is because the carburettor lies further forward on the rebuild than on Nr. 2 and Model 2 and the wheel rim / tyre and the frame tubes get in the way. Benz needed to be able to read his sight gauge and arranged his parts so that he could. Those responsible for the rebuild copied the position of the carburettor on the side view of patent DRP37435 (which was before the engine was moved forwards) rather than that which Benz showed on patent CH960A and used in Nr. 2 and Model 2.

On all the images of the single-belt vehicles, including patent drawings DRP37435 and CH960A, and on the surviving Model 2, the drive belt is straight. Crossed belts appeared from 1890 with the two-belt Model 3 and continued with the Viktoria and the Velo. Crossing the belt makes the countershaft rotate in the opposite direction to the driveshaft, so if no other change is made, either the vehicle runs backwards or the engine has to turn the other way.

=== Final form of the motorised velocipede ===
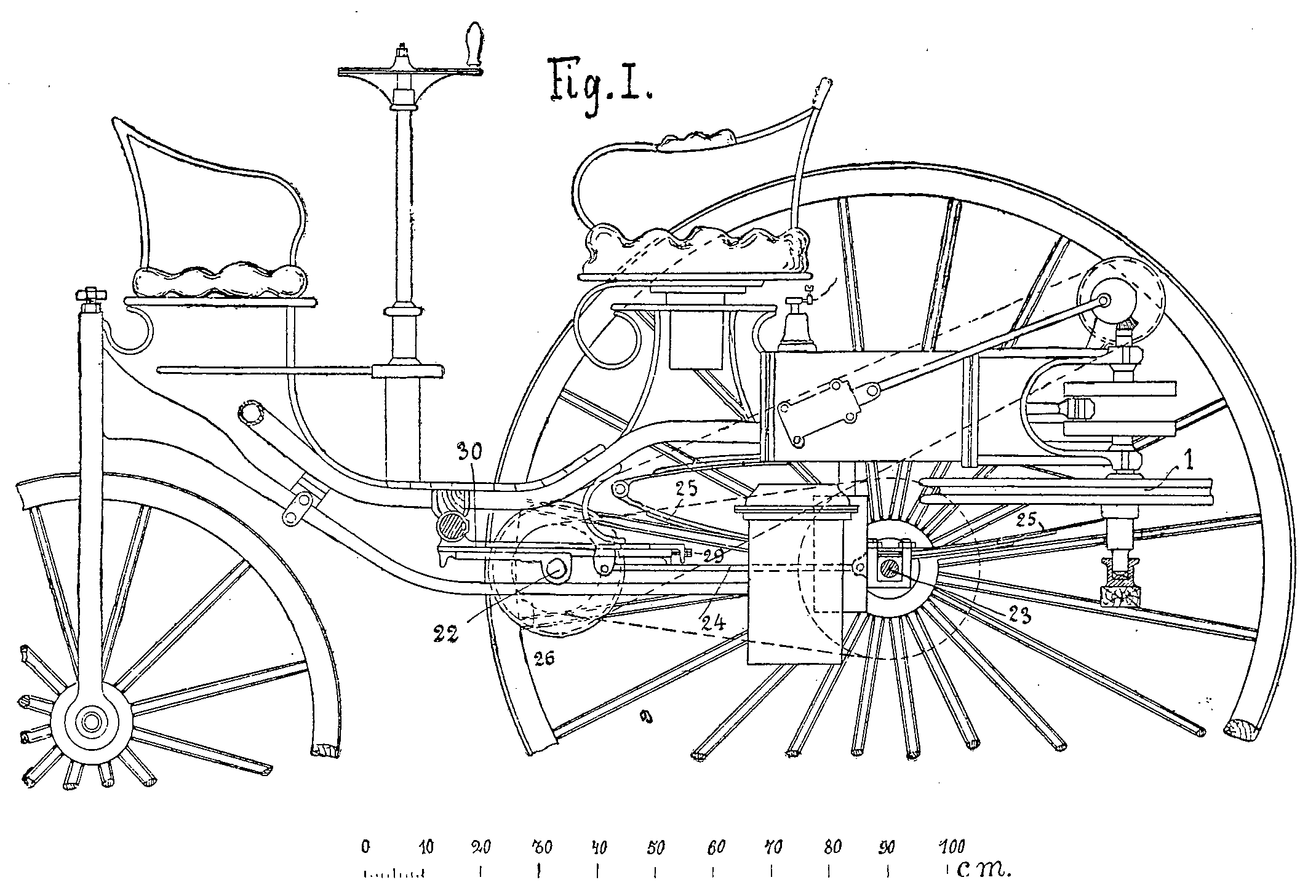
Fig. 1 of Patent CH960A: side view / section between left drive chain and carburettor

Benz was developing his Motorwagen continuously over the period 1884 – 87. Patent DRP37435 shows the motorised velocipede as it was in late 1885. Its final form lies somewhere between those drawings and Nr. 2.

There is a further drawing from this period: Fig I of patent CH960A. Although the patent drawings were prepared for printing in November 1888, the original drawings are much earlier. (Note: Benz obtained US patent 385087 for the Motorwagen in 1888, https://patentimages.storage.googleapis.com/13/c0/f5/01a4d4806ae0ef/US385087.pdf. It was a translation of the German patent DRP37435 of January 1886. Patent applications in overseas jurisdictions are often made several years after that in the home territory.) Fig I is a side view of a calèche with wheels larger than Benz used until 1892 on the Viktoria. While the vehicle in Fig I is not a motorised velocipede, the cushion, arms and back of the main seat match those of the 1895 rebuild. No other image shows that seat: after the uncushioned seat of patent DRP37435, the next seat is that within a wooden box on Nr. 2. Fig I corroborates the form of the seat in the 1895 rebuild as having been part of the Patent-Motorwagen between the vehicle in patent DRP37435 and Nr. 2. That gives a date to Fig I: between late 1885 and June 1886.

Fig. I may represent what Benz wanted to build next after Nr. 1, but could not afford. Instead he built the less-ambitious motorised Stanhope gig, Nr. 2. The following changes shown on Fig I were included:

- larger, wooden wheels
- the engine moved forwards so that the flywheel hardly projects behind the rear wheels;
- supports for the seat which lie entirely beneath it, rather than extending forwards;
- the steering stalk in the middle, some way from the seat;
- the carburettor just in front of the rear axle (i.e. where it was on Nr. 2).

Apart from its engine, Nr. 2 was a new vehicle. It was built (and tested) between the end of 1885 and Spring 1886, when Benz "no longer shied away from people and their criticism", presumably because he now had a more presentable vehicle. Benz was on a tight leash from Max Rose about expenditure on his horseless carriage (which probably explains the reuse of the cylinder from Nr. 1 in Nr. 2). Given this, and the short period involved, it seems unlikely that Benz would have built a second motorised velocipede in that period (as is sometimes claimed) as well as Nr. 2. More likely is that some of the changes incorporated in Nr. 2 were tested out on Nr. 1 while Nr. 2 was being built.

In order to make Nr. 1 easier to drive, the obvious first steps would be to:

- rework the seat's supports so that you could get in and out without having to go right to the front of the vehicle;
- make the seat more comfortable now that drives were longer;
- move the steering from the right edge to the centre so that all the controls could be operated while sitting in one position.

This would still leave access to the seat obstructed by the drive/brake lever. On Nr. 2 the drive/brake lever is beside the seat, not in front of it. Moving it backwards required some rework, but changes to the countershaft and the transmission would be small. The engine could also have been brought forward to reduce the flywheel's rear overhang; this would have required more substantial changes.

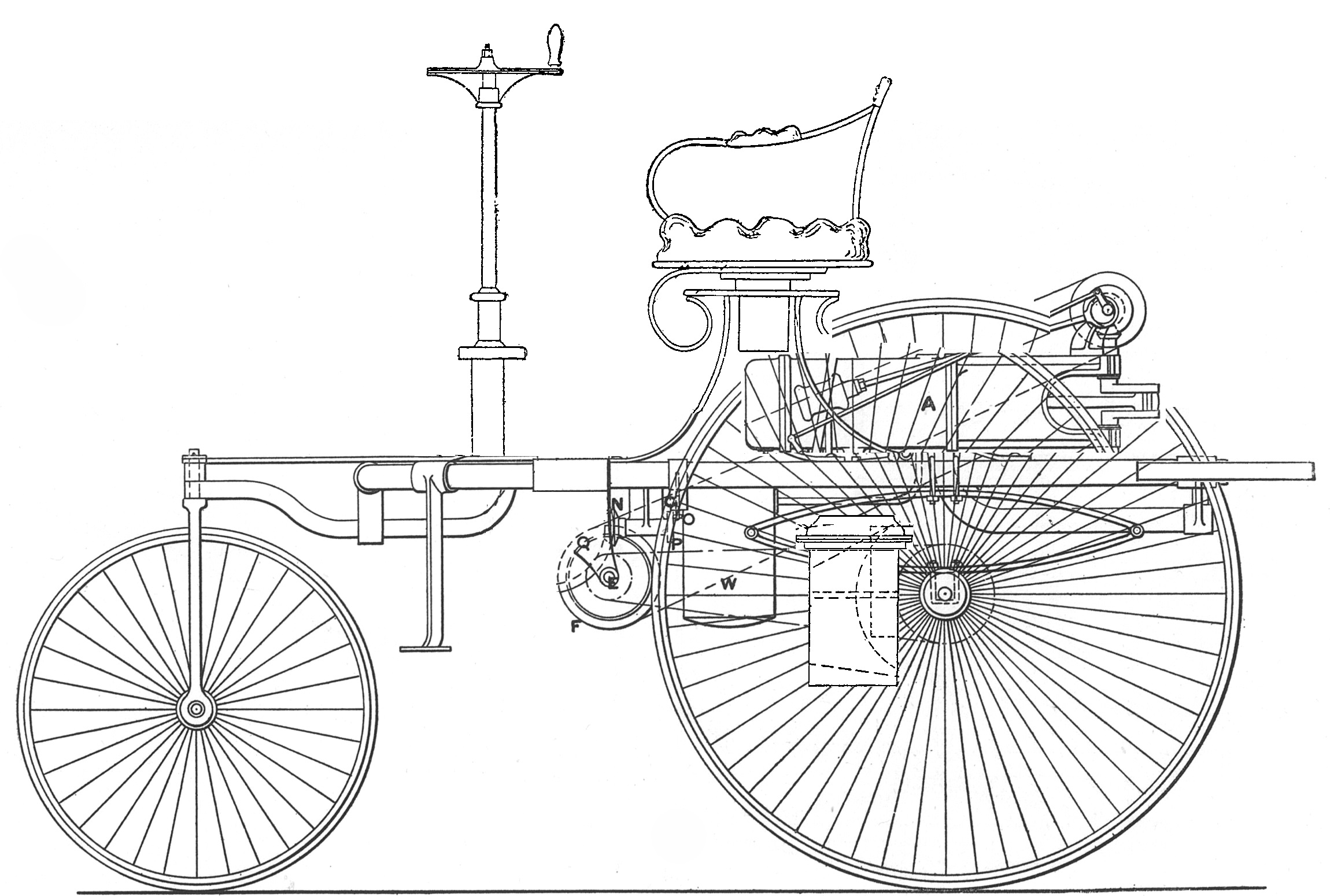
Pastiche of patent drawings DRP37435 and CH960A showing possible final form of Benz Patent-Motorwagen Nr. 1

The pastiche of patent drawings gives an impression of what Nr. 1 would have looked like with these changes. It has obvious defects: it doesn't show the drive/brake lever; it shows carburettors from both patents (the one closer to the front is from DRP37435; the one just in front of the rear axle, is from CH960).

The only publicly-available contemporary documentation (papers or images) about Nr. 1 is patent DRP 37435. Benz's Lebensfahrt is hazy about what happened during the development: it doesn't mention or illustrate Nr. 2 and it is only the quotes from the Neue Badische Landeszeitung which make it possible to establish that it was Nr. 2 which Benz was driving around Mannheim in June 1886. Benz's correspondence with Worby Beaumont provided the definitive image of Nr. 2 and its date, 1886.

The 1895 rebuild was led by the Sales Manager. It was not a scholarly attempt to replicate the original vehicle: such a vehicle would have had all the failings of the original, including its carburettor and fuel-delivery system. Instead, a vehicle was built which could be (and was) used in demonstrations, which continued after its transfer to the Deutsches Museum in 1906.

=== Subsequent History ===
With the passage of time, the vehicle created in 1895 has come to be seen as a replica of Nr. 1. Its origins and purpose have been lost. Images of it outside the pharmacy in Wiesloch outnumber those of Bertha, Eugen and Richard in a Model 2.

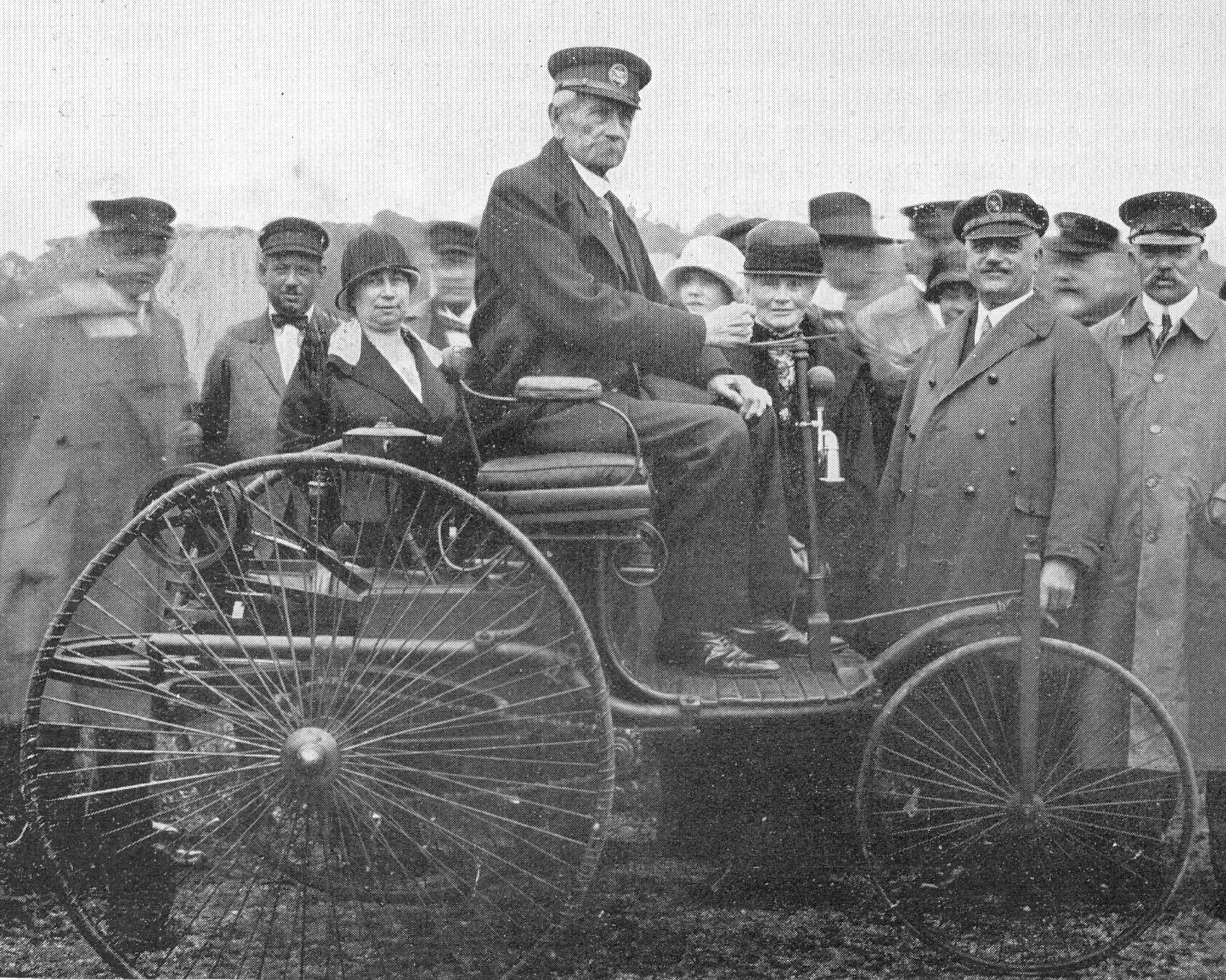
Carl Benz on 1895 rebuild of Patent-Motorwagen Nr. 1 (with Bertha standing to his right), Munich 12 July 1925

At some time between 1900 and 1923, further changes were made. In the photos from 1900, it is completely open beneath the seat and the top of the cylinder head can be seen. By the 1920s, photos show slats being carried up beneath the seat, hiding the engine. Through them projects a knob to control the fuel/air mixture. These are included in modern replicas.

On 12 July 1925 the Allgemeine Schnauferl-Club organised a parade of historic vehicles in Munich which Benz headed, driving his Patent-Motorwagen for one final time.

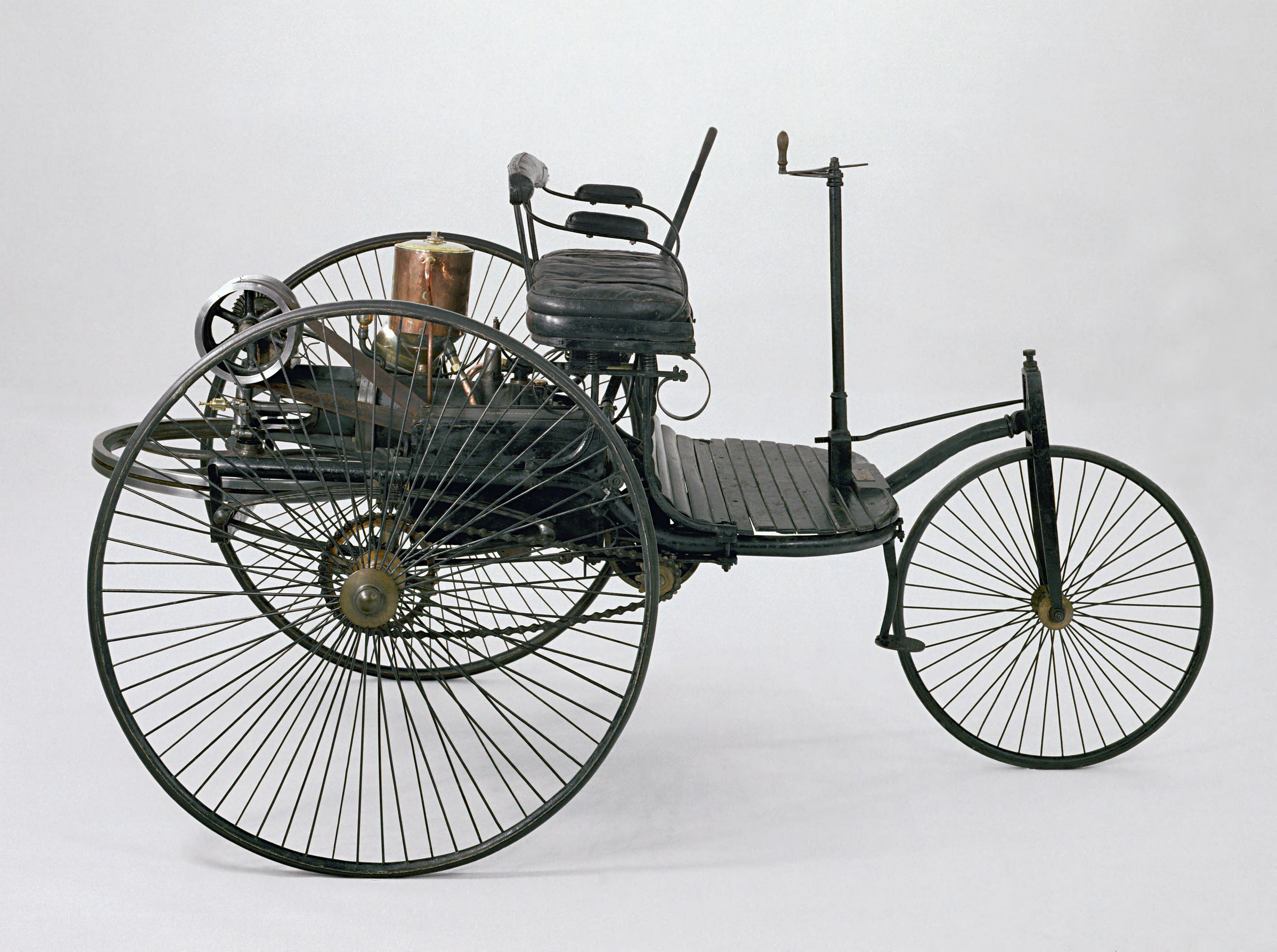
Right side of 1895 rebuild in Deutsches Museum

Between 1925 and 1961 the bent tube to the pivot of the front fork was replaced. In 1925 it had a continuous curve but is now bent only in the middle. The geometry also changed: in 1925 the steering stalk leaned back and the front fork was vertical; today the steering is vertical and the front fork has a forward cant. (Note: If the angle between the bent tube and the front fork had remained unchanged when the bent tube was replaced, the front fork would now have a reverse cant.)

More recently, copper pipework, associated fittings and the base of the carburettor show signs that they have been replaced.

Most modern replicas (including those by Mercedes-Benz Group) duplicate the post-1925 bent tube and the canted front fork.

== Mercedes-Benz Public Archive ==
At 18 May 2026 the Mercedes-Benz Public Archive's entries for "Model 3; 3 hp" included images of Nr. 2, and Model 2 but not Model 3. The images may be identified as:

- 22389: Model 2 – this is a higher-resolution version of Fig. 27 of Benz's Lebensfahrt. Its caption there is Mein erster Serienwagen von 1888. 1,5 PS, 2 Geschwindigkeiten bis zirka 16 km/Std., damaliger Preis 3000 Mark (My first series-produced car of 1888. 1.5 h.p., 2 speeds to approx. 10 mph, original price 3000 Mark). Although not credited, the image matches (apart from the absence of the six-foot rule on the floor) Plate III.2 in E.A.Forward's Catalogue of the Collections in the Science Museum: Land Transport II. Mechanical Road Vehicles (1925). The inside rear cover explains that photographs of machinery exhibited in the museum were for sale: bromide prints from 12" x 10" negatives (which explains the image's impressive quality) cost 2 shillings, as did standard-size lantern slides. As the Science Museum was then part of the UK Board of Education, its productions were Crown copyright and are now Public Domain.
- 22390: Model 2 – this is another image of the Science Museum's Model 2. The photograph matches (apart from the absence of the four-foot rule on the floor) Plate III in C.D.Buchanan's Mixed Blessing (1958), where it was credited to the Science Museum, London. It appears to be from the same photo-shoot as 22389. As with 22389, it was Crown copyright and is now Public Domain.
- 22588: Nr. 2 – this was used as advertising in 1888; the report beneath from the Munich Neueste Nachrichten of 16 September 1888 references the exhibition in Munich and describes the vehicle as eine viersitzige Komfortable Kaleche mit umlegbarem Regenbach (a comfortable four-seat calèche with a fold-down rain-hood). The engraving of Nr. 2 was published on p. 80 of Worby Beaumont (1900): Motor Vehicles and Motors. A high-resolution version of it cropped to show only the vehicle is on Wikimedia Commons and is used in this article.
- 31809: Model 2 – Carl and Bertha Benz driving round Munich in their Model 2 in September 1888. This image (an engraving, not a photograph) was published in the Leipzig Neue Illustrirte Zeitung of 1 December 1888 and was subsequently reproduced in the Scientific American. It is out of copyright and on Wikimedia Commons.
- 82441: Nr. 2 – another copy of 22588
- B39394: Model 2 – this is a painting of the trip by Bertha, Eugen and Richard from Mannheim to Pforzheim in early August 1888.
- C42836: Model 2 – engraving from unidentified source of a Model 2 in a street around 1890. Although most of the engine below the rear box is not shown, the reduction gearbox is, which implies that it had a single belt-system and horizontal flywheel.

The entries for "Model 3; 2.5 hp" included some of those listed above together with images of the Science Museum's Model 2 when it was on loan to Automuseum Dr Carl Benz in Ladenburg. (Note: Before its loan to Automuseum Dr Carl Benz, the Science Museum's Model 2 was loaned to the Mercedes-Benz museum in Stuttgart. Measurement of the cranks of the engine would have shown that its stroke was 160mm, identifying it as the 2.5 hp version rather than the 1.5 hp version which the Science Museum believed that it was. Despite the larger engine (which suggests that it was built after Bertha's trip to Pforzheim), Mercedes-Benz continue to advise the Science Museum that it dates from 1888, possibly because it has the sliding intake valve, which their records indicate was superseded in 1888.) Among them is:

- 2008DIG1669: photograph of the Science Museum's Model 2 to the left of a modern replica of the 1895 rebuild of the original vehicle.

The entries for "Model 3; 1.5 hp" include some of those listed for the Model 3; 3 h.p and in addition:

- 22584: Nr. 2 – this is similar to 22588 and is an advertisement from a catalogue; if the catalogue was published, the image would now be out of copyright. It is based on a photograph which appears as Plate 4B in Nixon's The Invention of the Automobile (1936); this identifies the passenger as Max Rose, director of Benz & Cie. It offers the most detailed view of the engine of Nr. 2 and complements the photograph of the rear of the Science Museum's Model 2.
- A33374: Model 3 – this shows Carl Benz driving a Model 3 with Josef Brecht beside him outside the Benz factory on Waldhofstrasse. It is evidently the basis of the engraving of Model 3 with the same occupants but in a Rhineland landscape with vineyards;
- 1988M51: Model 3 – 1892 advertisement for Model 3 quoting the price as 3000 Marks. This contains an engraving based on A33374 which was published on p. 81 of Worby Beaumont (1900): Motor Vehicles and Motors. A high-resolution version of it cropped to show only the vehicle is on Wikimedia Commons and is used in this article.

The description correctly identified the following image as being of Model 3 but it is not tagged to be returned in a search for Model 3:

- 1989M8: Model 3 – Eugen Zardetti and his family in a two-speed Model 3 on 19 March 1893. This is a higher-resolution version of the out-of-copyright image on Wikimedia Commons

At 18 May 2026 there were no entries for Model 2, but in addition to the images listed above, there was:

- 2007DIG2638: advertisement from 1888 for Émile Roger which shows (leftmost image) a Model 2 with a straight panel at the front rather than the rear-facing front seat.

At 18 May 2026 the entries for Model 1 mostly related to replicas of the 1895 rebuild of the original vehicle. Those which related to the rebuilt original vehicle itself were:

- 7689: this is a higher-resolution version of the out-of-copyright Fig 31 of Benz's Lebensfahrt
- 22680: this appears to be a retouched version of the out-of-copyright Fig 17 of Benz's Lebensafhrt
- 00159359: the "loose engine" of the 1895 rebuild on the bench.
- H3365: photograph of the rebuilt original vehicle being driven at the Baden-Baden Automobile Tournament, 10–15 July 1923;
- U17000: higher-resolution version of the widely-used photograph of the 1895 rebuild taken outside the Waldhofstrasse works before 1900. A cropped version was used as Fig. 38 of Worby Beaumont's Motor Vehicles and Motors (1900) and is now out of copyright.

== See also ==
- History of the automobile
- Benz Velo (later four-wheel model)

== Notes ==
Preceded by none	Fastest street-legal production car 19 km/h (11.81 mph)	Succeeded by Daimler Motorized Carriage
