= Paris–Rouen (motor race) =

World's first automobile race

Horseless Carriages Contest
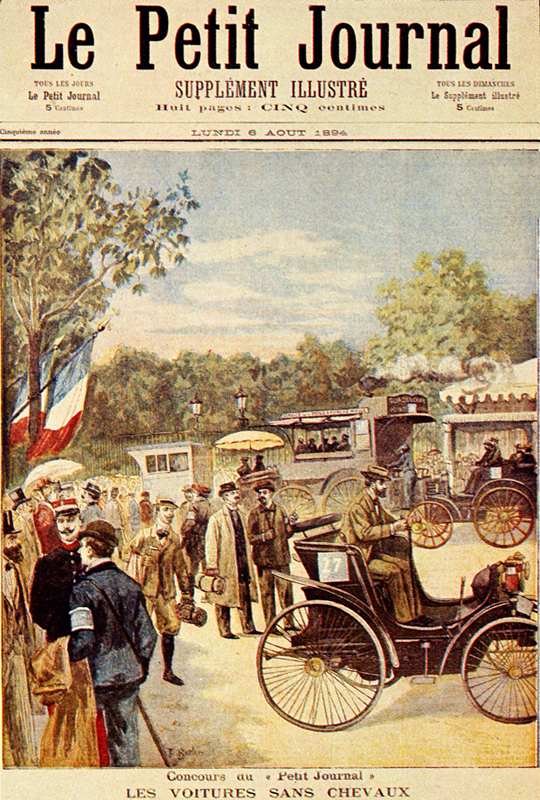
- Venue: Road from Paris to Rouen
- Location: France
- Corporate sponsor: Le Petit Journal; Pierre Giffard
- First race: 22 July 1894 (unique race); 102 entrants 21 qualified 4 stopped
- Distance: 126 kilometres (78 mi)

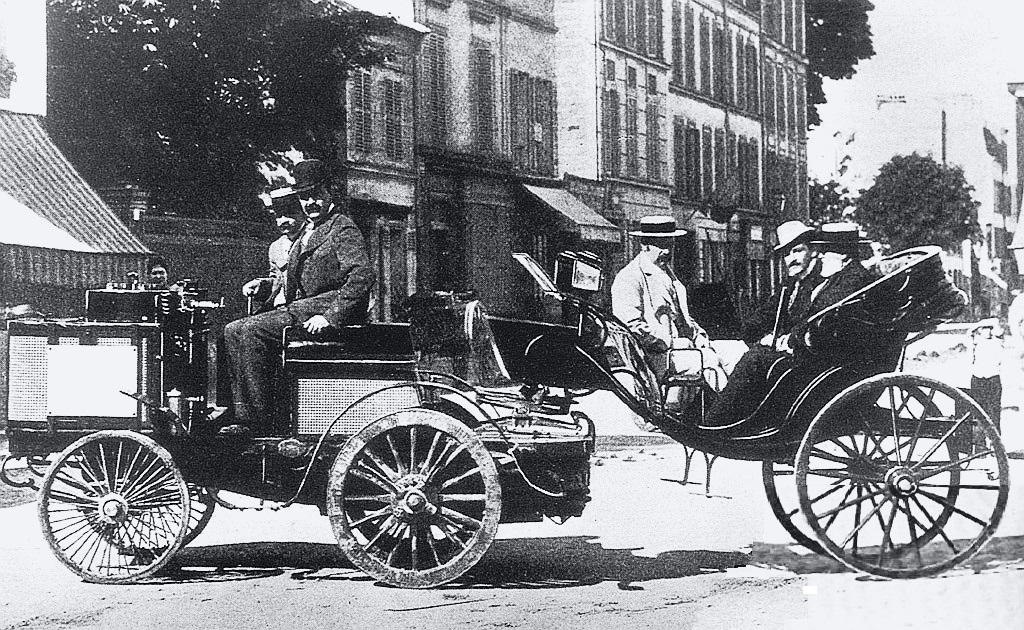
Jules-Albert de Dion finished first in a steam powered De Dion tractor towing a caléche carriage, but was not eligible for the prize. Among the passengers are de Dion, Étienne van Zuylen van Nyevelt-Rothschild, and writer Émile Driant.

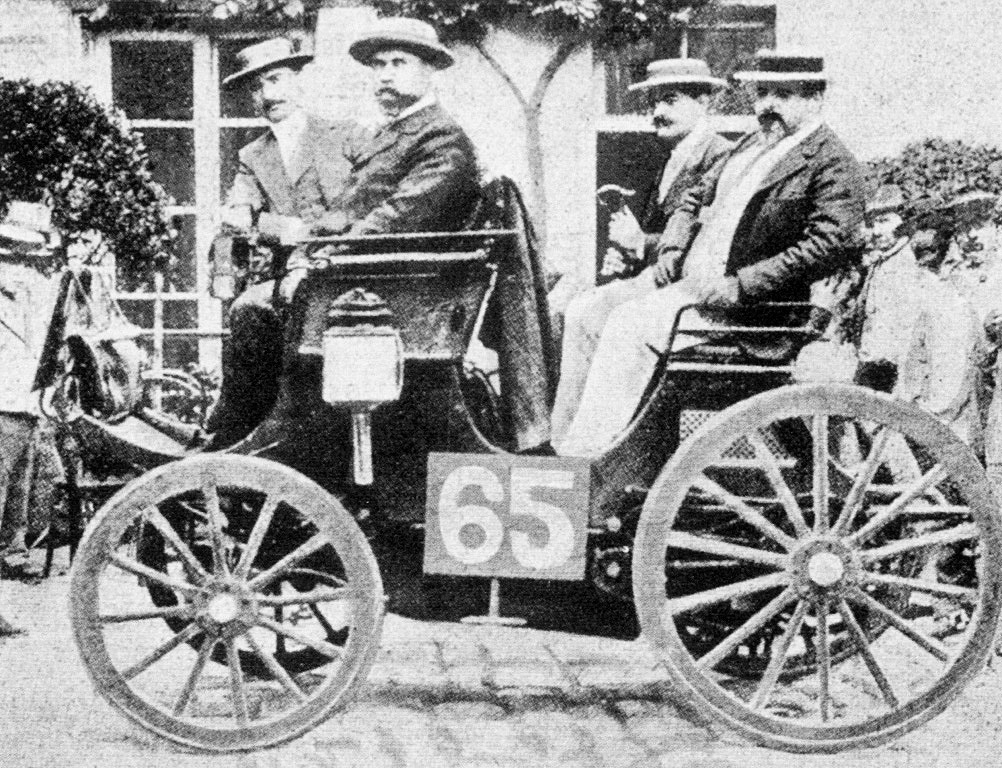
Albert Lemaître (pictured on left) finished second in a 3 hp Peugeot but was judged the winner. Bicycle and tyre manufacturer Adolphe Clément-Bayard was the front passenger.

Paris–Rouen (also Le Petit Journal Horseless Carriages Contest; French: Concours du 'Petit Journal' Les Voitures sans Chevaux) was a pioneering city-to-city motoring competition in 1894 which is sometimes described as the world's first competitive motor race.

The contest was organised by the newspaper Le Petit Journal and ran from Paris to Rouen in France on 22 July 1894. It was preceded by four days of vehicle exhibition and qualifying events that created great crowds and excitement. The eight 50 km (31 mi) qualifying events started near the Bois de Boulogne and comprised interwoven routes around Paris to select the entrants for the main 126 km (78 mi) event.

The first driver across the finishing line at Rouen was Jules-Albert de Dion, but he did not win the main prize because his steam vehicle needed a stoker and was thus ineligible. The fastest petrol-powered car was a 3 hp (2.2 kW; 3.0 PS) Peugeot driven by Albert Lemaître. The premier prize, the 5,000 franc Prix du Petit Journal, for "the competitor whose car comes closest to the ideal", was shared equally by manufacturers Panhard et Levassor and Les fils de Peugeot frères ('The sons of Peugeot brothers'), with vehicles that were "easy to use".

== 1894 – Paris to Rouen ==
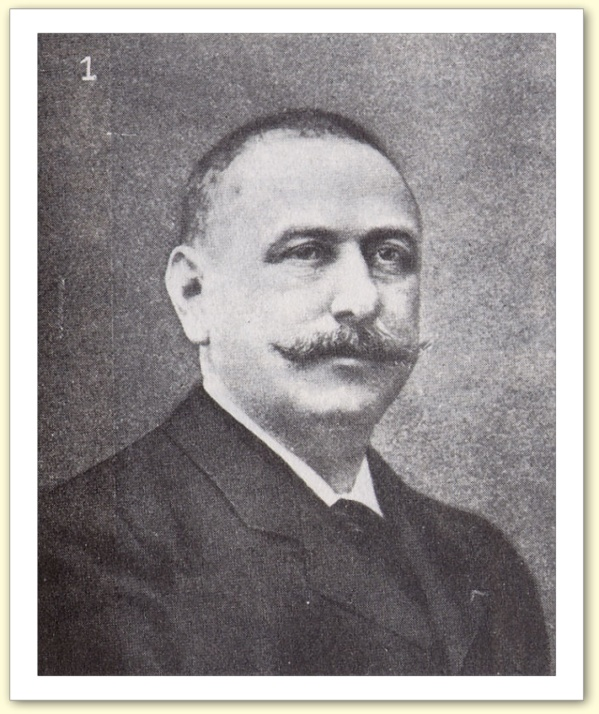
Pierre Giffard

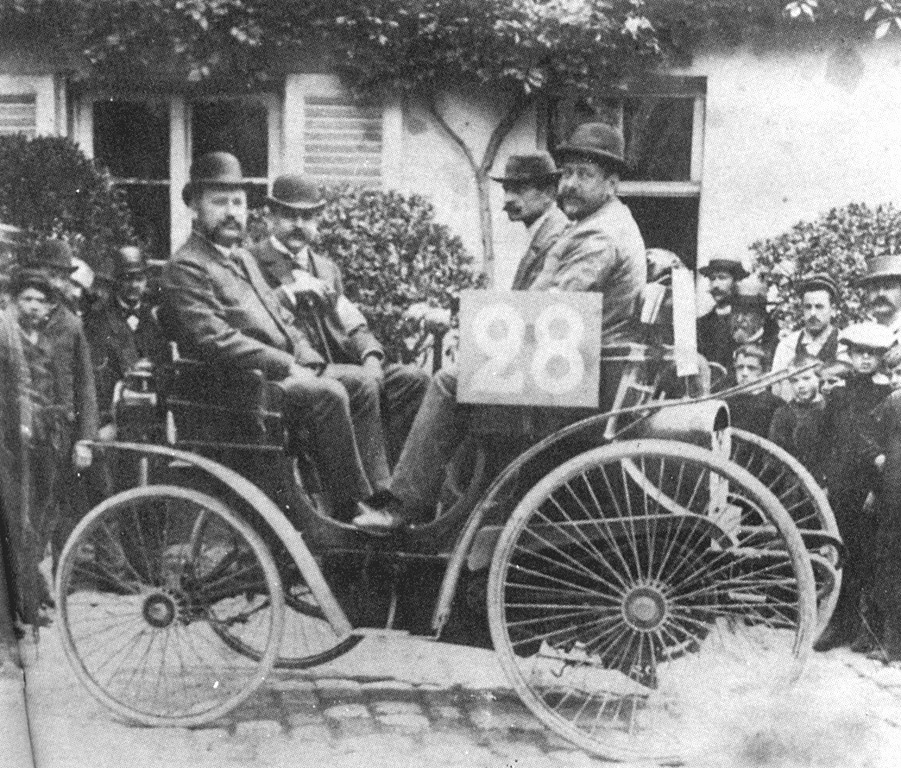
Auguste Doriot, finished third in a Vis a vis (Face to face) 3 hp Peugeot.

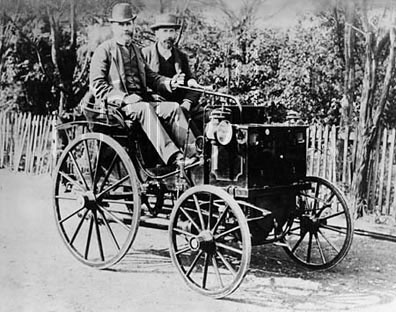
Panhard-Levassor (1890–1895), similar to Hippolyte Panhard's fourth-place finisher.

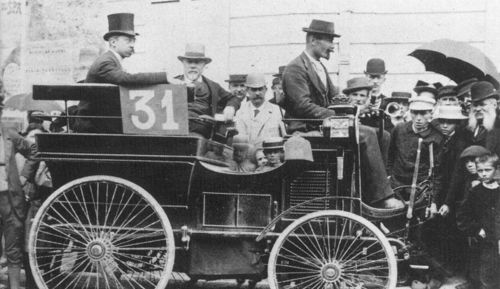
Émile Kraeutler finished 6th in a 3 hp Peugeot "break".

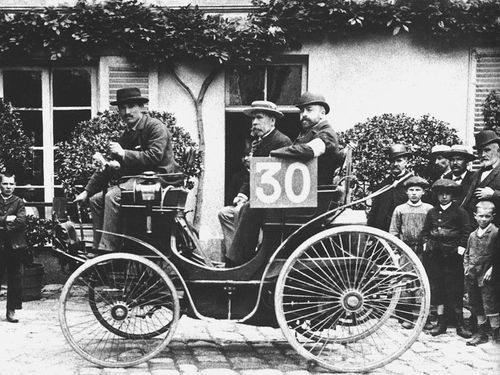
Gratien Michaux finished 9th in the 3 hp Peugeot phaeton.

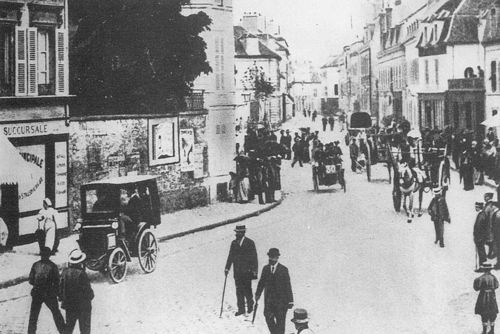
Michaux passes through a busy street in Mantes-la-Jolie, racing amongst horses and pedestrians, en route to Rouen where he finished 9th in the 3 hp Peugeot phaeton.

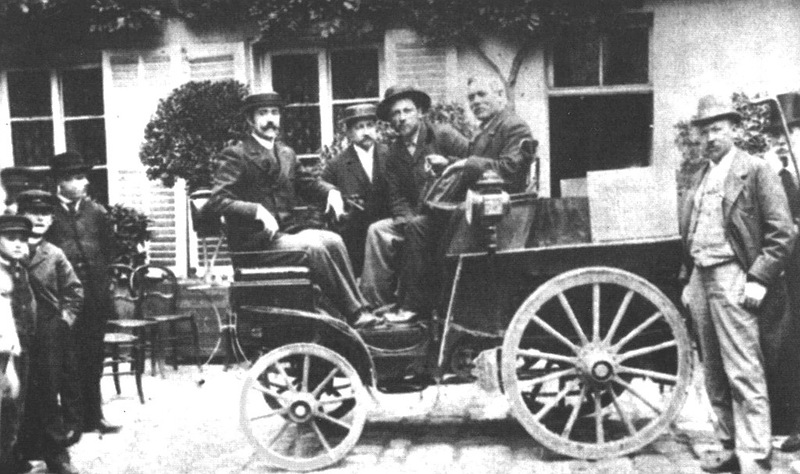
1894 Paris-Rouen Serpollet Steamer No 44 DNF (Leon Serpollet is 3rd from left)

=== Organisation ===
In 1894, Pierre Giffard, editor of Le Petit Journal, organised the world's first motoring competition from Paris to Rouen to publicise his newspaper, to stimulate interest in motoring and to develop French motor manufacturing. Sporting events were a tried and tested form of publicity stunt and circulation booster. The paper promoted it as "Le Petit Journal Competition for Horseless Carriages" (Le Petit Journal Concours des Voitures sans Chevaux) that were "not dangerous, easy to drive, and cheap during the journey", the main prize being for "the competitor whose car comes closest to the ideal". The "easy to drive" clause effectively precluded from the prizes (but not the event) any vehicles needing a travelling mechanic or technical assistant such as a stoker (i.e. steam powered vehicles).

Le Petit Journal announced prize money totalling 10,000 gold francs – 5,000 for first place, 2,000 for second, 1,500 for third, 1,000 for fourth, and 500 for fifth. The main prize was for the first eligible vehicle across the finish line in Rouen.

=== Entrants ===
One hundred two people paid the ten franc entrance fee. They ranged from practical manufacturers like Peugeot, Panhard, de Dion-Bouton, and Serpollet to amateur owners and "over-ambitious concepts." Seventy-eight entrants did not show up for qualifying on 18 July, which included some 25 powered by unfamiliar and improbable technologies such as: gravity (nine); compressed air (five); "automatic" (three); electricity (three); gas (three); hydraulics (two); and one each for liquid, pedals, propellers, and levers. Additionally, 19 petrol-powered designs and 26 steam-powered cars, quadricycles, and tricycles did not show up at the qualifying event.

=== Qualifying ===
Qualifying was held from 19 to 21 July 1894, and was preceded by a public exhibition of 26 cars to Neuilly-sur-Seine on 18 July. Journalists reported great crowds and excitement throughout the routes, and at Précy-sur-Oise they finished through a triumphal arch. On 19 July, 26 cars lined the side of the Boulevard Maillot, stretching to the Bois de Boulogne, each parked 10 m (33 ft) apart until, at 8:00 am, the first car led off, followed at 15-second intervals by the others. The 50 km (31 mi) qualifying event had to be completed in under three hours to be eligible to start the main event, the 126 km (78 mi) race from Paris to Rouen; 21 were selected for the main event.

Qualifying was used as a major publicity tool for both the event and the newspaper: "for our readers who want to see the cars on the roads around Paris". The 22 vehicles were split into five groups who completed complex interwoven tours of Paris and its environs, including Mantes-la-Jolie, Château de Saint-Germain-en-Laye, Flins-sur-Seine, Poissy, Triel-sur-Seine, Rambouillet, Versailles, Dampierre-en-Yvelines, Corbeil-Essonnes, Palaiseau, Précy-sur-Oise, Gennevilliers and L'Isle-Adam, Val-d'Oise. The groups were carefully balanced to ensure each included petrol and steam, a Peugeot, a Panhard & Levassor, and different seating. Le Petit Journal, on the morning of the event, still officially expected Lemoigne and his gravity-powered vehicle to participate, although he was included as an additional member of group five.

The groups that set off from Porte Maillot on Thursday 19 July were:

- Itinerary one – Paris to Mantes-la-Jolie via Château de Saint-Germain-en-Laye and Flins-sur-Seine:
  - No. 3 de Dion, Bouton et Cie, break, six seats, steam. – Did not qualify for Paris-Rouen.
  - No. 13 Panhard et Levassor, four seats, petrol – qualified
  - No. 21 Letar, four seats, steam – did not qualify
  - No. 30 Les fils de Peugeot frères, three seats, petrol – qualified
- Itinerary two – Paris to Mantes-la-Jolie via Poissy and Triel-sur-Seine:
  - No. 10 Scotte, 8–10 seats, steam – qualified
  - No. 15 Panhard et Levassor, two seats, petrol – qualified
  - No. 25 Coqatrix, four seats, steam – qualified
  - No. 28 Les fils de Peugeot frères, four seats, petrol – qualified
  - No. 44 de Prandieres, six seats, system Serpollet and petrol combined (Note: Systeme Serpollet was a form of steam engine. The car evidently had both a steam and a petrol motor, but details have been lost to time.) – qualified

(Note – Le Petit Journal does not show an itinerary three, presumably either a misprint or changed plan)

- Itinerary four – Paris to Rambouillet via Versailles and Dampierre-en-Yvelines:
  - No. 7 Gautier, four seats, steam – qualified
  - No. 18 Archdeacon, six or seven seats, steam – qualified
  - No. 19 Le Blant, eight to ten seats, steam – qualified
  - No. 42 Le Brun, four seats, petrol – qualified
- Itinerary five – Paris to Corbeil-Essonnes via Versailles and Palaiseau:
  - No. 4 de Dion, Victoria, four people, steam – qualified
  - No. 16 Quantin, six seats, petrol – did not qualify
  - No. 27 Les fils de Peugeot frères, two seats, petrol – qualified
  - No. 29 Les fils de Peugeot frères, four seats, petrol – did not qualify
  - No. 40 Lemoigne, four seats, 'gravity powered'. Note – did not show or was eliminated.

(Sources show three or five vehicles on this route and variance over qualification)

- Itinerary six – Paris to Précy-sur-Oise via Gennevilliers and L'Isle-Adam, Val-d'Oise:
  - No. 12 Tenting, four seats, petrol. Note – did not qualify for Paris-Rouen.
  - No. 14 Panhard et Levassor, four seats, (new type) petrol – qualified
  - No. 24 Alfred Vacheron, two seats, petrol – did not qualify until Saturday 21st
  - No. 31 Les fils de Peugeot frères, break, five seats, petrol – qualified

On Friday 20 July a second qualifying event was run over two routes.

- Itinerary one – Paris to Mantes-la-Jolie via Bezons, Houilles and Maisons-Laffitte.
  - No. 44 de Prandieres, six seats, system Serpollet and petrol combined – qualified
  - No. 60 Le Blant, Serpollet, nine seats, steam – qualified
  - No. 64 Émile Mayade, Panhard et Levassor, four seats, petrol – qualified
  - No. 65 Albert Lemaître, Les fils de Peugeot frères, four seats, petrol – qualified
- Itinerary two – Paris to Corbeil-Essonnes
  - No. 61 Roger de Montais, De Montais, two seat tricycle, petrol – qualified
  - No. 85 Émile Roger, Benz, two seats, petrol – qualified

On Saturday 21 July a third qualifying event was run from Paris to Poissy.

- No. 53 de Bourmont (de Bourmont, four seats, petrol) – qualified
- No. 24 Alfred Vacheron, two seats, petrol – qualified

=== Race ===
At 8:00 am on Sunday 22 July, twenty-one qualifiers started from Porte Maillot and went via the Bois de Boulogne, Neuilly-sur-Seine, Courbevoie, Nanterre, Chatou, Le Pecq, Poissy, Triel-sur-Seine, Vaux-sur-Seine, and Meulan, to Mantes where they stopped for lunch from noon until 1:30 pm, whence they set off to Vernon, Gaillon, Pont-de-l'Arche, and the 'Champ de Mars' at Rouen.

Count de Dion was the first to arrive in Rouen after 6 hours 48 minutes at an average speed of 19 km/h (12 mph). He finished 3 min 30 sec ahead of Albert Lemaître (Peugeot), Auguste Doriot (Peugeot) (16 min 30 sec back), Hippolyte Panhard (Panhard) (33 min 30 sec) and Émile Levassor (Panhard) (55 min 30 sec). The winner's average speed was 17 km/h (11 mph).

=== Prizes ===
On Tuesday 24 July Le Petit Journal announced the prizes :

- First prize, the Prix du Petit Journal for "the competitor whose car comes closest to the ideal" (5,000 francs) was shared equally between Panhard et Levassor and 'Les fils de Peugeot Frères'.
- Second prize, the Prix Marinoni (Owner of Le Petit Journal) (2,000 francs) was awarded to de Dion, Bouton et Cie for their "interesting steam tractor that works like a horse and gives both absolute speed and pulling power up hills".
- Third prize, the Prix Marinoni (1,500 francs) was awarded to Maurice Le Blant for his nine-seater vehicle powered by the 'systeme Serpollet'.
- Fourth prize, the Prix Marinoni (1,000 francs) was shared between two manufacturers, Alfred Vacheron (No. 24) and Le Brun (No. 42).
- Fifth prize, the Prix Marinoni (500 francs) was awarded to Roger (No. 85)

== Results for Paris–Rouen ==
Position overall	Number	Driver / entrant	Make	Power	People	Time overall	Position at Mantes	Time Paris-Mantes circa 50 km	Time Mantes-Rouen circa 80 km
1	4	Jules-Albert, Count de Dion, Bouton	De Dion-Bouton	Steam	4	6 h 48 m 00 s or 5 h 40 m	2	2 h 38 m	4 h 10 m
2	65	Albert Lemaître – 'Les fils de Peugeot Frères'	Peugeot	Petrol (Daimler)	4	6 h 51 m 30 s or 5 h 45 m	1	2 h 36 m	4 h 15 m
3	28	Auguste Doriot – 'Les fils de Peugeot Frères'	Peugeot	Petrol (Daimler)	4	7 h 04 m 30 s or 5 h 50 m	4	2 h 44 m	4 h 20 m
4	13	Hippolyte Panhard – Panhard et Levassor	Panhard et Levassor	Petrol (Daimler)	4	7 h 21 m 30 s or 6 h 3 m	5	2 h 48 m	4 h 33 m
5 or 7	15	Émile Levassor – Panhard et Levassor	Panhard et Levassor	Petrol (Daimler)	2	7 h 43 m 30 s or 6 h 30 m	3	2 h 43 m	5 h 0 m
6 or 5	31	Émile Kraeutler – 'Les fils de Peugeot Frères'	Peugeot	Petrol (Daimler)	4	7 h 46 m 30 s or 6 h 7 m	10	3 h 9 m	4 h 37 m
7 or 8	64	Émile Mayade	Panhard et Levassor	Petrol (Daimler)	4	8 h 09 m 00 s or 6 h 49 m	6	2 h 50 m	5 h 19 m
8 or 6	42	A. Le Brun	Le Brun	Petrol (Daimler)	4	8 h 12 m 00 s or 6 h 24 m	13	3 h 18 m	4 h 54 m
9 or 10	30	Gratien Michaux – 'Les fils de Peugeot Frères'	Peugeot	Petrol (Daimler)	3	8 h 25 m 00 s or 7 h 2 m	7	2 h 53 m	5 h 32 m
10 or 13	14	"Dubois" – Panhard et Levassor	Panhard et Levassor	Petrol (Daimler)	4	8 h 38 m 00 s or 7 h 10 m	8	2 h 58	5 h 40 m
11 or 12	27	Louis Rigoulot – 'Les fils de Peugeot Frères'	Peugeot Type 5	Petrol (Daimler)	2	8 h 41 m 00 s or 7 h 5 m	12	3 h 16 m	5 h 35 m
12 or 11	24	Alfred Vacheron	Vacheron / Panhard	Petrol (Daimler)	2	8 h 42 m 30 s or 7 h 3 m	11	3 h 9 m	5 h 33 m
13 or 9	53	"De Bourmont"	de Bourmont	Steam	4	8 h 51 m 00 s or 7 h 1 m	15	3 h 21 m	5 h 31 m
14	85	Émile Roger	Benz	Petrol (Benz)		10 h 01 m 00 s or 8 h 9 m	16	3 h 22 m	6 h 39 m
15	60	Maurice Le Blant	Serpollet	Steam	8	10 h 43 m 00 s or 8 h 50 m	17	3 h 23 m	7 h 20 m
16	7	Pierre Gautier	Gautier–Wehrlé	Steam	4	12 h 24 m 30 s	19	4 h 17 m	8 h 7 m
17	18	Ernest Archdeacon	Serpollet	Steam	6	13 h 00 m 00 s	14	3 h 20 m	9 h 40 m
Stopped	44	"De Prandiéres"	Serpollet	Steam	4	Nanterre – broken wheel		retired	out
Stopped	19	Étienne le Blant	Serpollet	Steam	10	Motor	20	4 h 39 m	retired
Stopped	10	"J. Scotte"	Scotte	Steam	8	Motor	9	3 h 8 m	retired
Stopped	61	Roger de Montais	De Montais	Steam	2	Motor	18	4 h 0 m	retired

== List of entrants ==
Result	No.	Entrant manufacturer	City	Seats	Engine type
No show	1	Rousselet	Paris	4	gravity
No show	2	Edouard Pellorce	Neuilly-sur-Seine		petrol
Did not qualify	3	De Dion-Bouton et Co	Puteaux	4	steam
Started	4	De Dion-Bouton et Co	Puteaux	6	steam
No show	5	Le Maitre	Paris	4	steam
No show	6	Roussat	Paris	4	hydraulic
Started	7	Gautier P	Paris	4	steam
No show	8	Hidien	Châteauroux	4	steam
No show	9	Victor Popp	Paris	4	air compressor
Started	10	Scotte J	Épernay	8	steam
No show	11	Klaus Th	Lyon	4	petrol
Did not qualify	12	Tenting	Paris	4	petrol
Started	13	Panhard & Levassor	Paris	4	petrol
Started	14	Panhard & Levassor	Paris	4	petrol
Started	15	Panhard & Levassor	Paris	4	petrol
No show	16	Quantio	Roubaix	6	petrol
No show	17	Rodier, Roche et Sabatier	Bagnols-sur-Cèze		petrol
Started	18	Archdeacon M E (or Serpollet)	Paris	7	petrol (or steam)
Started	19	Le Blant	Paris	10	steam
No show	20	Paraire G	Château-Thierry		steam
No show	21	Letar Alexandre	Paris	4	steam
No show	22	Gaillardet	Petit Gennevilliers	4	steam
No show	23	Varennes	Paris	3	steam
Started	24	Vacheron Alfred	Monthermé	2	petrol
No show	25	Coquatrix	Paris	4	steam
No show	26	Leval	Paris	4	baricycle?
Started	27	Peugeot Fils et frères	Valentigney	4	petrol
Started	28	Peugeot Fils et frères	Valentigney	4	petrol
Did not qualify	29	Peugeot Fils et frères	Valentigney	4	petrol
Started	30	Peugeot Fils et frères	Valentigney	4	petrol
Started	31	Peugeot Fils et frères	Valentigney	4	petrol
No show	32	Darras L	Bruay	tricycle	steam
No show	33	Geoffroy M P			steam
No show	34	Geoffroy M P			steam
No show	35	Geoffroy M P			steam
No show	36	Gillot Jules	Maubeuge	4	petrol
No show	37	Loubiere Albert	La Ferté-sous-Jouarre	6	gravity
No show	38	Duchemin A	Paris	4	
No show	39	Ponsot	Paris	4	Oil?
No show	40	Lemoigne Louis	Fougères	4	gravity
No show	41	Bargogli	Paris	4	petrol
Started	42	Le Brun A	Rouen	4	petrol
No show	43	Spanoghe	Antwerp, Belgium	6	steam
Started	44	de Prandieres M	Lyon	6	Serpollet steam
No show	45	Cornequet	Paris	8	automatic
No show	46	Matin-Cudrez F	Paris	2	steam
No show	47	Barthelemy Cesar	Yèbles	3	gravity
No show	48	Leblanc	Ay, Marne	6	steam
No show	49	Valentin J M	Bruyères	3	gravity
No show	50	Werstein	Paris	3	pedals
Result	No.	Entrant	City	Seats	Engine type
No show	51	Lepape	Paris	4	petrol
No show	52	Société Parisienne de constructions Velo	Paris	4	air compressor
Started	53	de Bourmont M	Arcachon	4	petrol
No show	54	Froger Elie	Feneu	4	petrol
No show	55	De Dion-Bouton et Co	Puteaux	4	petrol
No show	56	Lebrun M	Roches-Bettaincourt	4	automatic
No show	57	Seunier M		4	petrol
No show	58	Barbier et Marcillet	Paris	3	steam
No show	59	Bezamat	Colombes	4	steam
Started	60	Le Blant Maurice	Paris	9	steam
Started	61	de Montais Roger	Beauvroit	2	petrol
No show	62	Mallarme	Gentilly		steam
No show	63	Tissandier et Lacombe	Agen		petrol
Started	64	Panhard & Levassor	Paris		petrol
Started	65	Peugeot Fils et frères	Valentigney	4	petrol
No show	66	Museur L et Cordonnier E	Masnières	4	steam
No show	67	Lebesgue	Paris		petrol
No show	68	Garnier E et Delannoy G	Beauvois	4	combination
No show	69	de Malapert et Barriere	Paris	4	liquid
No show	70	Fays – Poisson	Gigny	6	gravity
No show	71	Klaus Th	Lyon	2 tricycle	petrol
No show	72	Tamarelle – Capeyron	Bergerac	5	steam
No show	73	Pretot	Paris	4	petrol
No show	74	Mayer Raoul	Chevanceaux	2 quadracycle	steam
No show	75	Dessaux Charles	Paris	2 tricycle	gravity
No show	76	Tirant Georges	Baissy		steam
No show	77	Reverseau	Paris	4	automatic
No show	78	Berthaud	Lyon	8	air compressor
No show	79	Baudet A	Paris	4	steam
No show	80	Quantin	Boulogne	6	steam
No show	81	Becherel	Paris	2 tricycle	steam
No show	82	Monges	Paris	4	electric
No show	83	Suodais	Fontenay	6	electric
No show	84	Plantard	Paris	4	air compressor
Started	85	Roger	Paris	2	petrol
No show	86	Garrard; Garrard & Blumfield	Birmingham; Great Britain		electric
No show	87	Landry & Beyroux G		4	petrol
No show	88	Jeantaud	Paris	3	petrol
No show	89	Demont	Paris	4	steam
No show	90	Mansart	Beauvais	4	gravity
No show	91	Carli le comte	Italy	2	electric
No show	92	de Farcy	Angers	2	petrol
No show	93	Gantry	Orléans	2	gas
No show	94	Morelleras H	Angoulême		gravity
No show	95	Roze – Andrillon	Marseille	4	air compressor
No show	96	Canis	Maulan	4	propeller
No show	97	Deutsch M	Germany	2	petrol (Benz Car)
No show	98	Deutsch M	Germany	2	petrol (Benz Car)
No show	99	Bonnefils	Valence	2	petrol
No show	100	Bellanger	Le Mans	4	system
No show	101	Mary Jean	Paris	4	gas
No show	102	Barriquand M		4	hydraulic
Result	No.	Entrant	City	Seats	Engine type

== Gallery ==
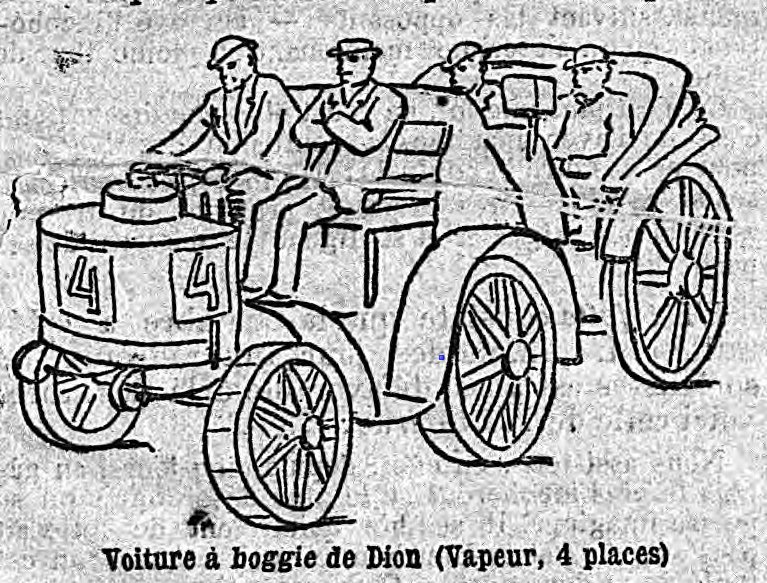
de Dion-Bouton
steam Voiture a boggie
Count de Dion finished first
Le Petit Journal – Contest for Horseless Carriages, Paris-Rouen.
Le Petit Journal
Sunday 22 July 1894

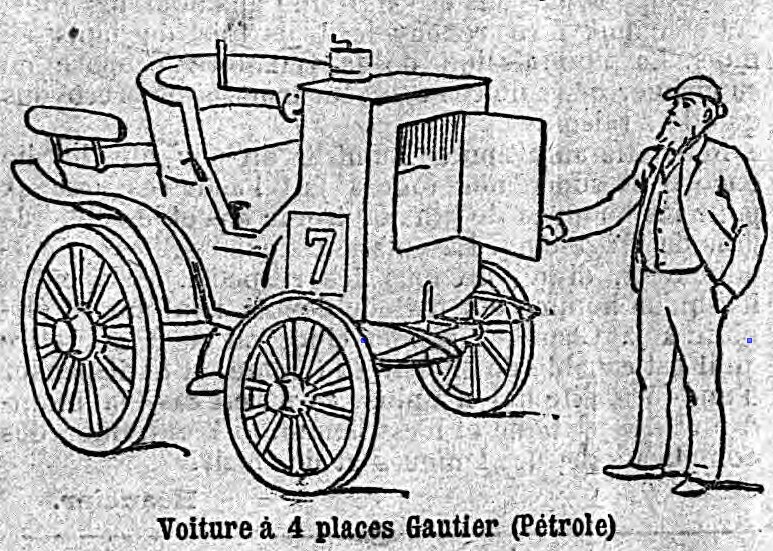
Gautier–Wehrlé
(Steam. mis-labelled image)
Pierre Gautier finished 19th
Le Petit Journal – Contest for Horseless Carriages, Paris-Rouen.
Le Petit Journal
Sunday 22 July 1894

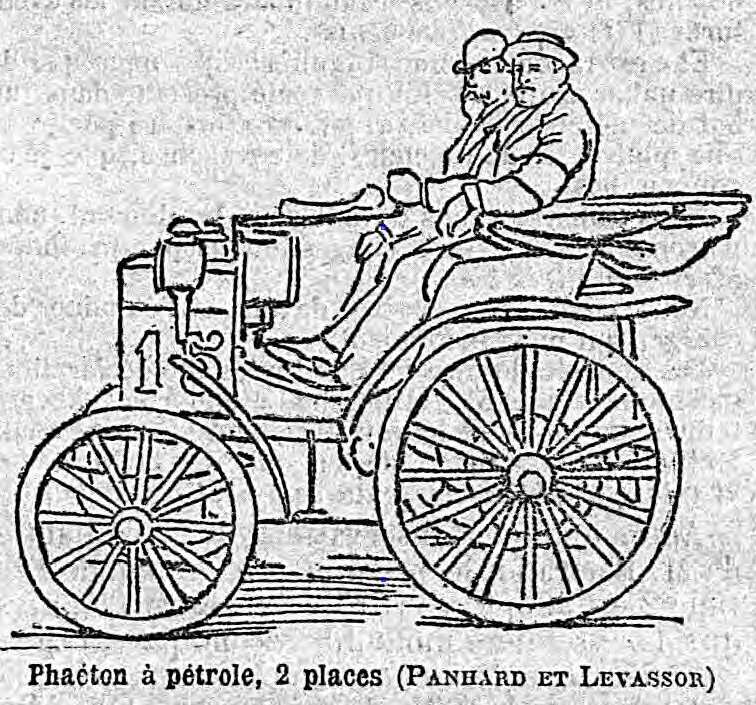
Panhard et Levassor
'Phaeton a petrole'
Émile Levassor finished 5th
Le Petit Journal – Contest for Horseless Carriages, Paris-Rouen.
Le Petit Journal
Sunday 22 July 1894

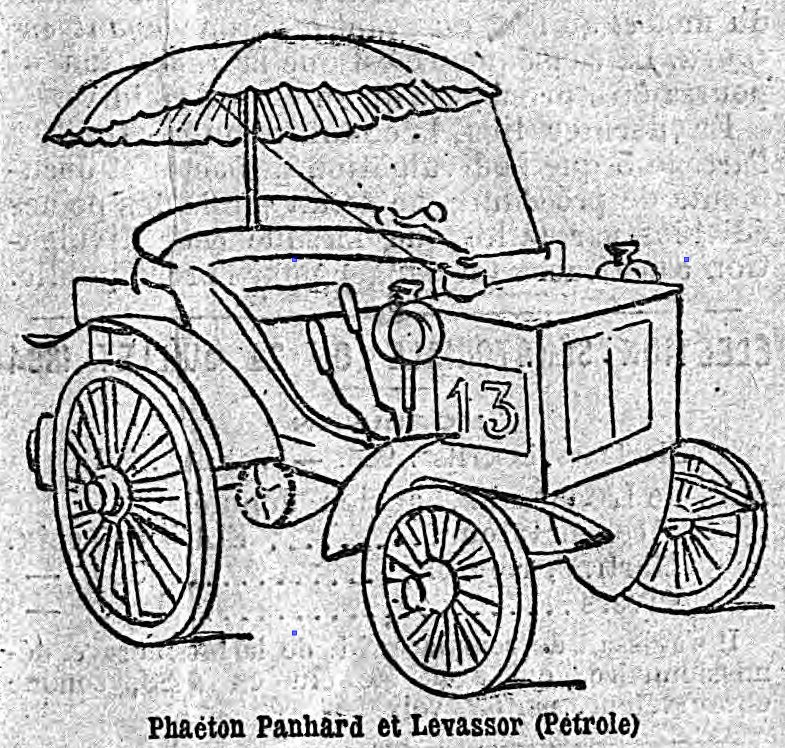
Panhard et Levassor
petrol Phaeton
Hippolyte Panhard finished 4th
Le Petit Journal – Contest for Horseless Carriages, Paris-Rouen.
Le Petit Journal
Sunday 22 July 1894

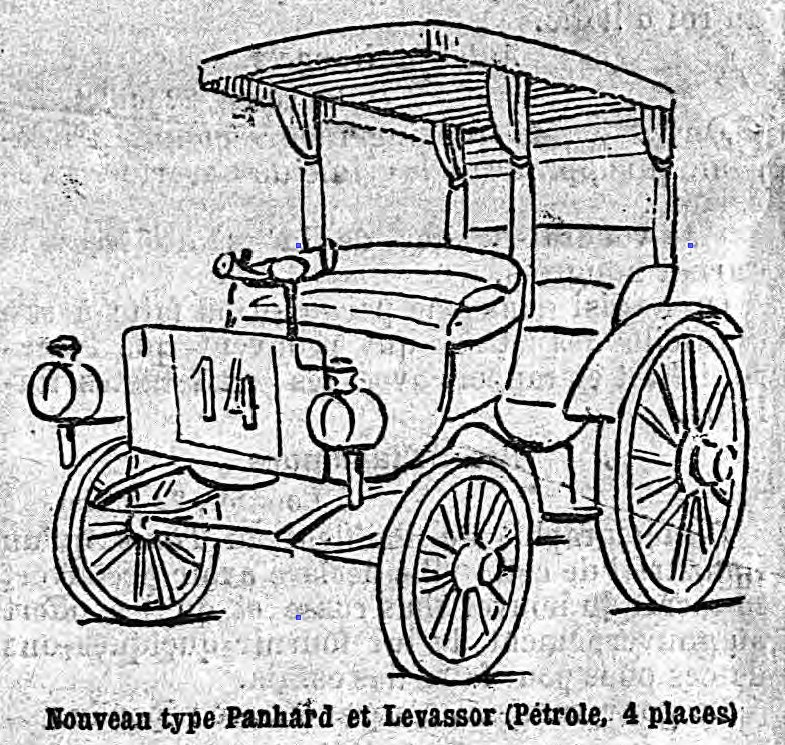
Panhard et Levassor
Nouveau type
Dubois finished ninth
Le Petit Journal – Contest for Horseless Carriages, Paris-Rouen.
Le Petit Journal
Sunday 22 July 1894

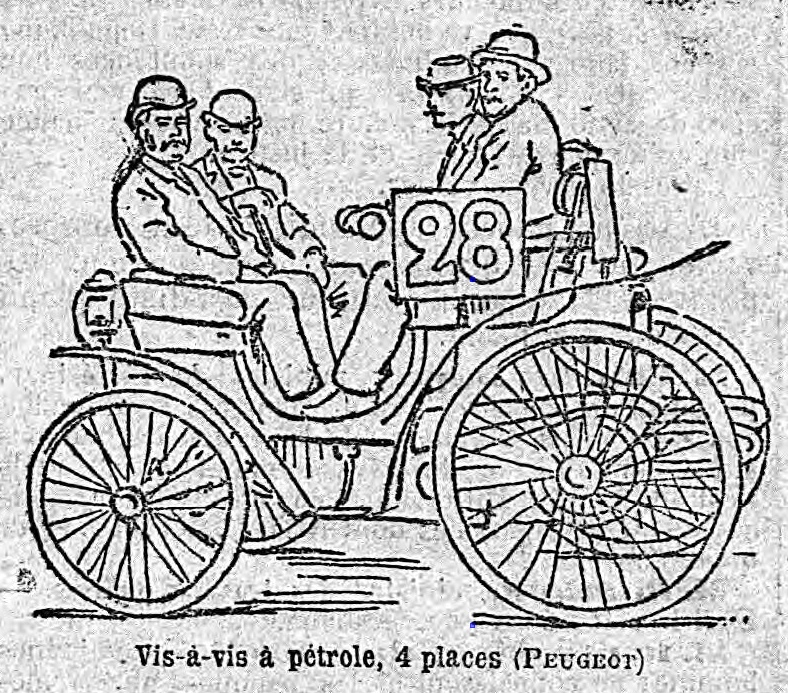
Peugeot Type 5 Vis a vis
3 hp
Auguste Doriot finished 3rd
Le Petit Journal – Contest for Horseless Carriages, Paris-Rouen.
Le Petit Journal Sunday 22 July 1894

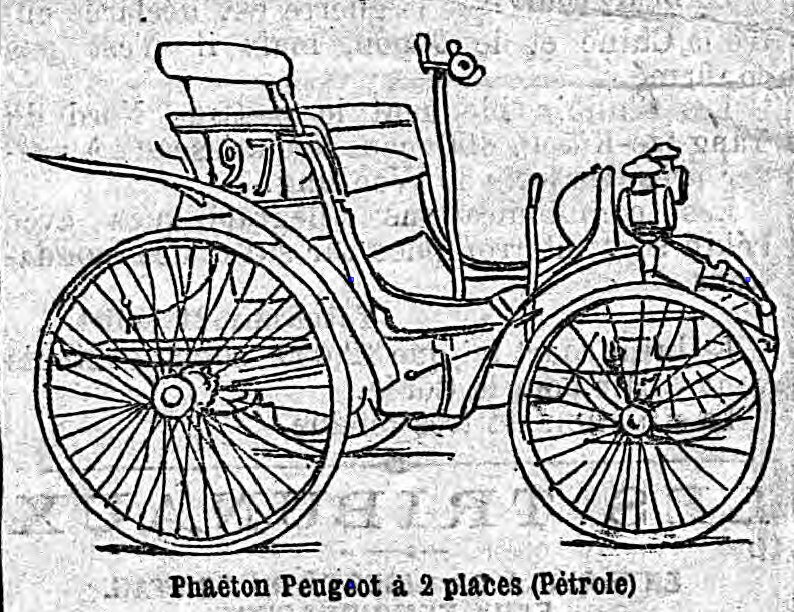
Peugeot Type 5 Phaeton
petrol,
Louis Rigoulot finished 11th
Le Petit Journal – Contest for Horseless Carriages, Paris-Rouen.
Le Petit Journal
Sunday 22 July 1894

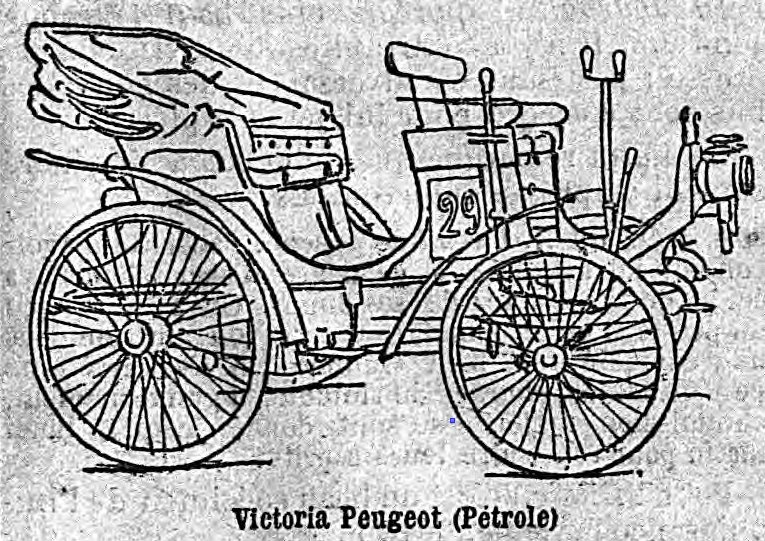
Victoria Peugeot
petrol
Did not qualify
Le Petit Journal – Contest for Horseless Carriages, Paris-Rouen.
Le Petit Journal
Sunday 22 July 1894

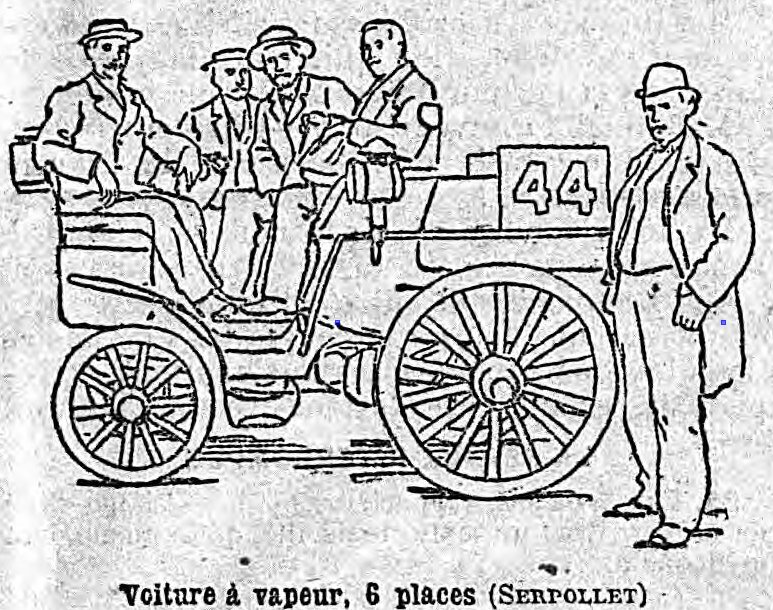
Serpollet
steam car
did not finish
Le Petit Journal – Contest for Horseless Carriages, Paris-Rouen.
Le Petit Journal
Sunday 22 July 1894

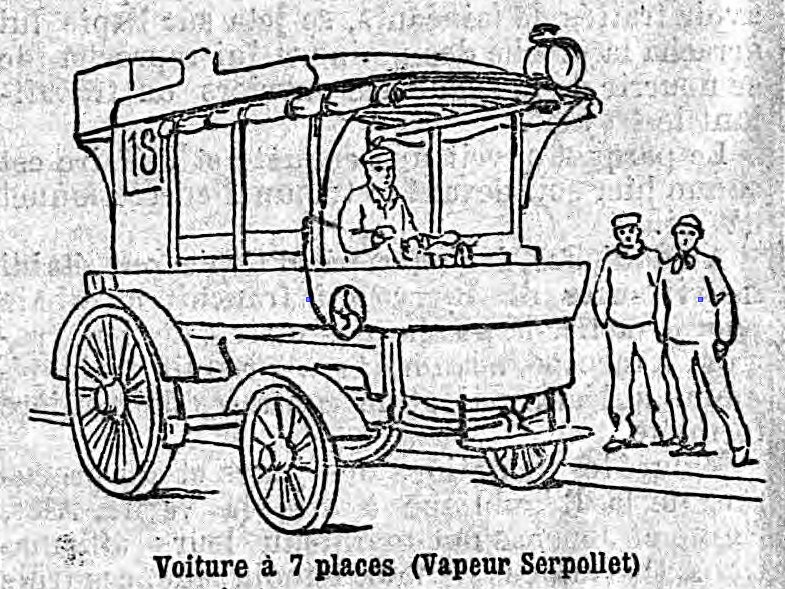
Serpollet
steam car with 7 seats
Ernest Archdeacon finished 16th
Le Petit Journal – Contest for Horseless Carriages, Paris-Rouen.
Le Petit Journal
Sunday 22 July 1894

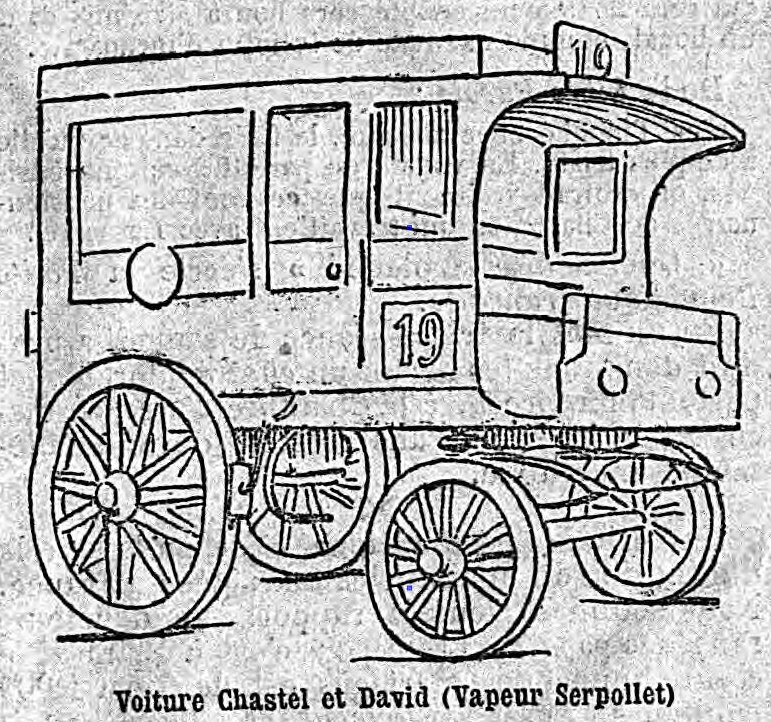
Chastel et David Serpollet
steam
did not finish
Le Petit Journal – Contest for Horseless Carriages, Paris-Rouen.
Le Petit Journal
Sunday 22 July 1894

== See also ==
- 1896 Paris–Marseille–Paris
- Motorsport before 1906
- Paris–Bordeaux–Paris
- Paris–Madrid race
- Peugeot Type 5
- Peugeot Type 6/7
- Peugeot Type 8
