= Peugeot Type 5 =

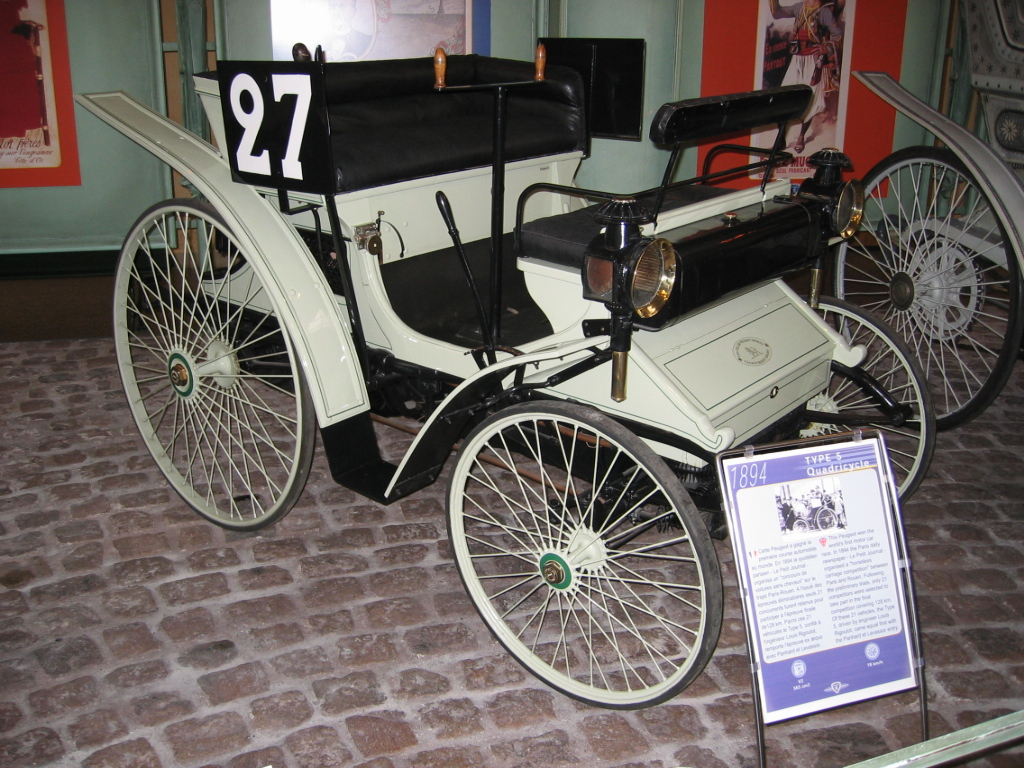

Overview
- Manufacturer: S. A. des Automobiles Peugeot
- Production: 1893–1896; 14 produced

Body and chassis
- Body style: Runabout
- Layout: RR layout

Powertrain
- Engine: 565 cc V-twin; 2 hp @ 1000 rpm

Dimensions
- Wheelbase: 1.30 metres (51 in)
- Curb weight: 400 kg

Chronology
- Predecessor: Peugeot Type 4
- Successor: Peugeot Type 6

The Peugeot Type 5 was a small car by Peugeot, produced from 1893 to 1896. Mechanically, little was changed from the Peugeot Type 3. The engine and most of the mechanical parts were unchanged, but the car was shorter, lighter, and correspondingly made more of its 2 horsepower. However, against larger models from Peugeot, this car did not fare well. A total of 14 were sold.

== A motor racing first ==
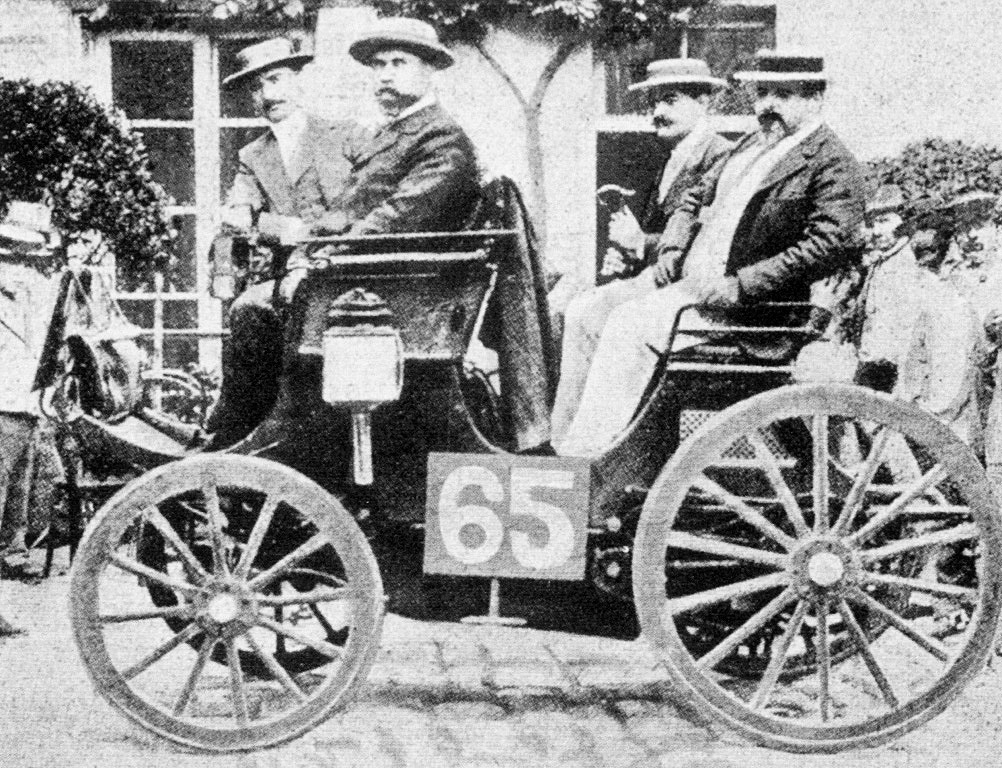
Paris-Rouen 1894. Albert Lemaître (pictured on left) was classified 1st in his Peugeot 3hp. Bicycle manufacturer Adolphe Clément-Bayard was the front passenger.

The 1894 Paris–Rouen "contest for horseless carriages" organised by Le Petit Journal. Albert Lemaître, driving the 3 hp Peugeot (No.65), was the first petrol (gasoline) engined finisher. Five Peugeots reached the finish at Rouen - Albert Lemaître, Auguste Doriot, Émile Kraeutler, "Michaud", and Louis Rigoulot. "Les fils de Peugeot Frères" were judged to have won the first prize, the 5,000 franc Prix du Petit Journal, which they shared equally with Panhard et Levassor. (Note: According to the Musée de l'Aventure Peugeot, a Peugeot Type 5 driven by Louis Rigoulot won the first motor race in the world, but the reference description is over-ambitious about the achievements of both its display car and Rigoulot, and it is confused about the status of the "race". The event was declared by the organisers as not a race. It acclaims Louis Rigoulot as the winner, but he finished 11th in car 27, the car shown in this article. Peugeot were judged by the organisers to have tied for overall victory with Panhard et Levassor. At the Musée de l'Aventure Peugeot the exhibit label (2012) states: / Musée de l'Aventure Peugeot - exhibit label (2012); This Peugeot won the first automobile contest in the world. In 1894 the Paris daily "Le Petit Journal" organized a "contest of horseless carriages" from Paris to Rouen. Following the heats, only 21 competitors were selected to participate in the final round of 128 km. Of these 21 vehicles the Type 5, entrusted to the engineer Louis Rigoulot, won the race tying with Panhard et Levassor / «Cette Peugeot a gagné le première course automobile au monde. En 1894 le quotidien parisien « Le Petit Journal » organisa un « concours de voitures sans chevaux » sur le trajet Paris-Rouen. A l’issue des épreuves éliminatoires, seuls 21 concurrents furent retenus pour participer à l’épreuve finale de 128 km. Parmi ces 21 véhicules le Type 5, confié à l’ingénieur Louis Rigoulot, remporta l’épreuve ex aequo avec Panhard et Levassor»)
