= Peugeot Type 7 =

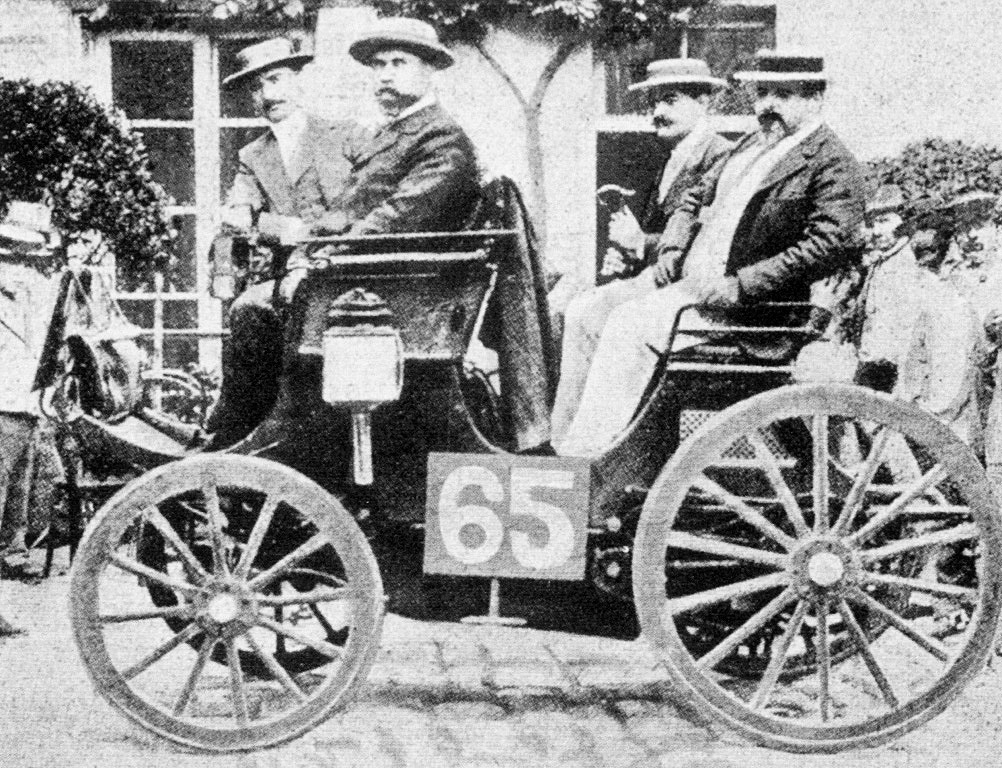
- Albert Lemaître (on left) in his Peugeot Type 7 at the 1894 Paris-Rouen race; his was the first petrol-powered car to finish.

Overview
- Manufacturer: S. A. des Automobiles Peugeot
- Production: 1894–1897; 32 units produced

Body and chassis
- Layout: RR layout

Powertrain
- Engine: 1.3 L V-twin Daimler

Dimensions
- Wheelbase: 1.65 metres (65 in)

Chronology
- Predecessor: Peugeot Type 6
- Successor: Peugeot Type 8

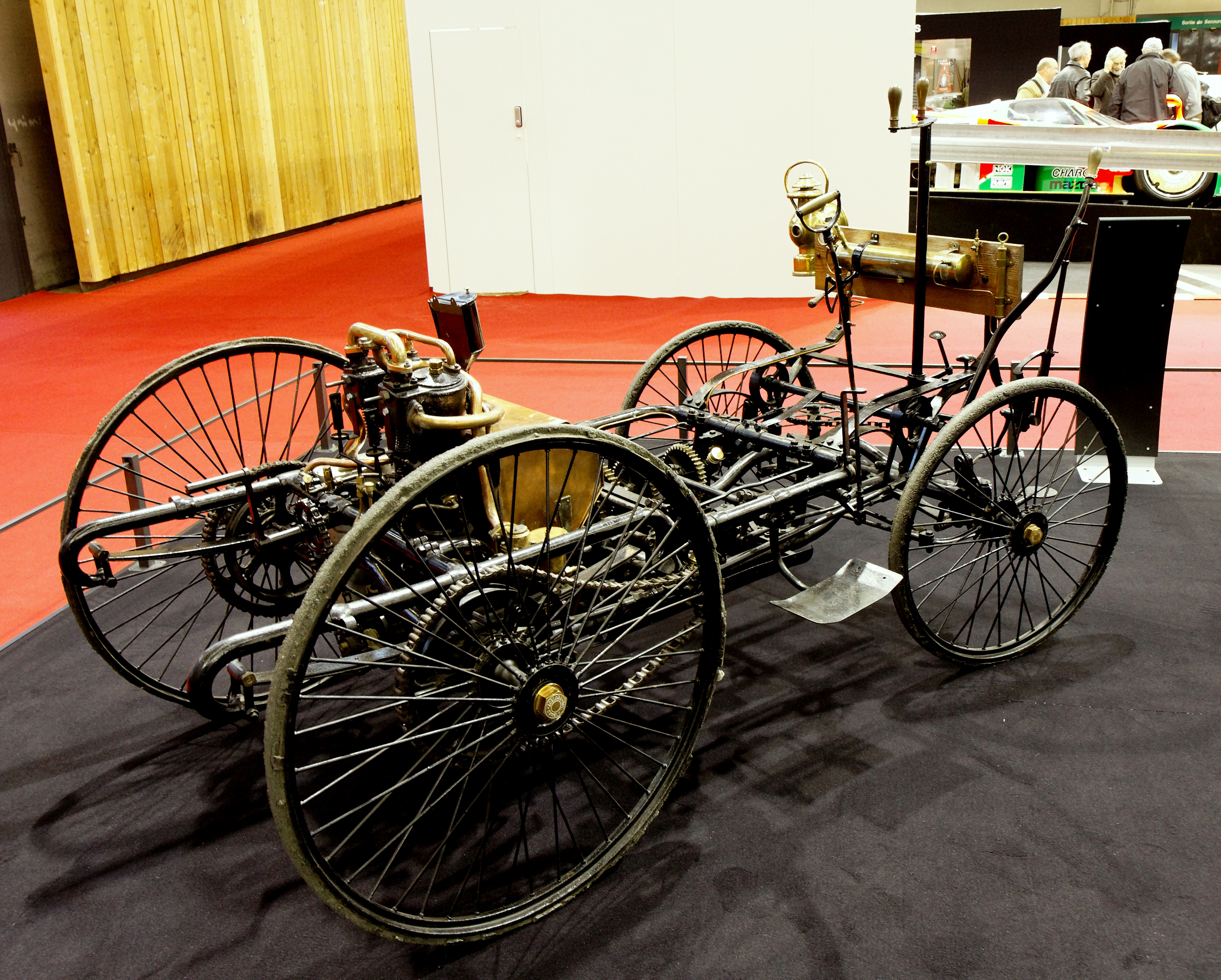
A bare Peugeot Type 7 chassis.

The Peugeot Type 7 was built on the same chassis as the Peugeot Type 6 and shared some mechanicals but its engine was twice the size, and twice as powerful. It had a phaeton style body for 4 persons. 25 units were built between 1894 and 1897. The engine was carried over to the Type 8.

== Description ==
The 1,282 cc V-twin Daimler engine was mounted at the back, and produced 3.7 hp. The cooling radiator was mounted at the front of the vehicle and the coolant flowed within the chassis tubing. Transmission was via a cone clutch, 4 speed gearbox and chains propelling the rear wheels. Some models had steel wire wheels with rubber tyres and others had wooden wheels. The weight was circa 650 kg and top speed was 18-20 km/h.

== Competition ==
In 1894 Peugeot entered the 'Le Petit Journal' Competition for Horseless Carriages that ran from Paris to Rouen with several Type 5's and 7s. Albert Lemaître's Type 7 Phaeton was the first petrol powered vehicle to finish, 3 minutes behind Jules-Albert, Comte de Dion on his steam powered tractor.

In 1895, a Peugeot Type 7 driven by Paul Koechlin with Rubichon as a mechanic, won the Paris–Bordeaux–Paris race.
