= Peugeot Type 8 =

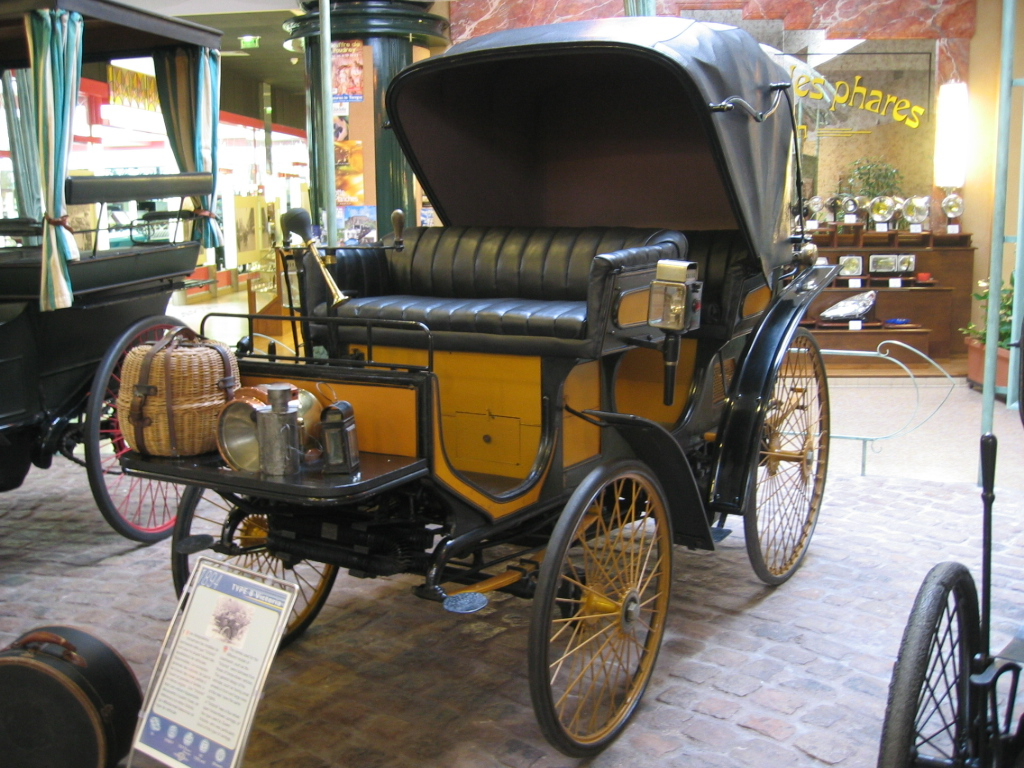

Overview
- Manufacturer: S. A. des Automobiles Peugeot
- Production: 1893–1896

Body and chassis
- Body style: Runabout
- Layout: RR layout

Powertrain
- Engine: 1.3 L V-twin

Dimensions
- Wheelbase: 1.61 metres (63 in)

Chronology
- Predecessor: Peugeot Type 7
- Successor: Peugeot Type 21

The Peugeot Type 8 was a small four-seater runabout produced by Peugeot from 1893 to 1896. The engine displaced 1282 cc and was carried over from the Peugeot Type 7, though the Type 8 was otherwise mechanically different from the Type 7. Total production figures are unknown.
