= Gautier–Wehrlé =

Gautier–Wehrlé was a French manufacturer of steam, petrol and electric powered vehicles from 1894–1900.

== History ==
The company 'Rossel, Gautier et Wehrlé' of Paris was founded in 1894 to produce steam powered automobiles, and was renamed Société Centrale in 1896. The founders were Édouard Rossel, Charles Gautier, and Xavier Wehrlé. Production ceased in 1900. Charles Gautier later founded Gautier et Cie.

== Vehicles ==
The first car was entered in the 1894 Paris–Rouen contest where it finished in 16th place after completing the 127 km (79 mi) in 12 hours 24 minutes. Two cars were entered in the Paris–Bordeaux–Paris but neither finished.

In 1896, the 8 hp model used a gasoline engine, three-speed transmission and shaft drive. In 1898 they offered several single-cylinder models from 5 hp to 12 hp, a model with a two-cylinder engine, and electric cars.

== Licensing ==
Linon from Belgium made some models under license.
