= Albert Lemaître =

French racing driver

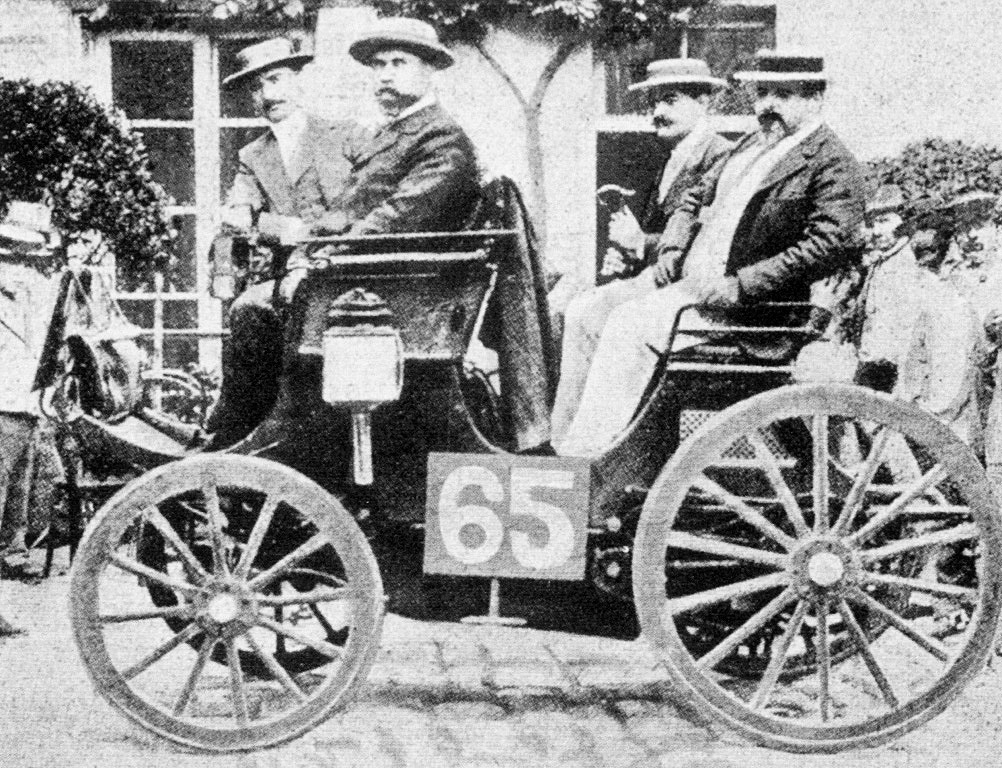
Paris–Rouen 1894. Albert Lemaître (pictured on left) was classified 1st in his 3hp Peugeot Type 7. Bicycle manufacturer Adolphe Clément-Bayard was the front passenger.

Albert Lemaître (5 February 1864 – 27 July 1912), (aka Georges Lemaître (Note: Some modern anglophone secondary sources (and myriad derivative internet sites) use the name Georges Lemaître, but the leading contemporary French sources of the 1890s–1900s, motoring magazines and publications La France Automobile and La Vie Automobile consistently refer to him as Albert Lemaître, as do The Great Road Races 1894–1914 by Henry Serrano Villard and Mercedes And Auto Racing In The Belle Epoque, 1895–1915 by Robert Dick.)), was a French sporting motorist and early racing driver. He was the first petrol powered finisher in what is described as 'the world's first competitive motoring event' when he drove his Peugeot Type 7 from Paris to Rouen at 19 km/h (12 mph) in 1894. The Comte de Dion had finished first but his steam-powered vehicle was ineligible for the main prize which was shared between the manufacturers Peugeot and Panhard.

Throughout the 1890s he competed in a range of events and races driving Peugeots, but after their withdrawal from competition in the early 1900s he was contracted to drive Mercedes.

In 1906, while he was in Paris, he murdered his wife in a domestic argument after she had filed for divorce. He then fired the third gunshot into his own head, but survived. In September 1906 he was acquitted of a crime of passion.

== Family life ==
Albert Lemaître was born in 1864 in Aÿ, a village outside Épernay, where he worked in partnership with his brother as an exporter in the champagne industry. His brother's name is not established, but could be Joseph "Georges" Lemaître, born in 1868 in Aÿ as the son of the wine dealer Louis-Emmanuel Lemaître and M. Julie Fabry. This Georges Lemaître married into the Mercier champagne family and was also involved in motoring during the 1900s. Circa 1901 (1900), Albert married Miss Lucie Dumény after her first engagement with a Mr. Bruyant had been broken off for family reasons. His business was failing, resulting in serious domestic difficulties. After 4 years of marriage, Lucie had rekindled feelings for her ex-fiancée and in February 1906 she both filed for divorce and moved out of the marital apartment. On 7 May 1906 at the apartment on rue de Miromesnil in Paris he murdered her with two gunshots and then shot himself in the head. She was 28 years old and they had no children. Albert Lemaître was taken to the 'Hopital Beaujon'. On hearing the news of Lucie's death, Bruyant took his own life. In September 1906 Lemaître was acquitted of a crime of passion. (Note: The 'rue Albert Lemaître' in Courcelles, Belgium is associated with the artist Albert Lemaître (1886-1975) who was born in Liège and died in Milhars)) (Note: Le Figaro Paris, 8 May 1906 states: Le Figaro Paris, 8 May 1906. General News, Paris. The Drama of the Rue de Miromesnil / Offline newspaper cutting Nouvelles Diverses A Paris. Le Drame de la rue de Miromesnil; An emotional marital drama happened around seven o'clock last night at rue de Miromesnil, in the neighborhood of La Madeleine. Mr. Albert Lemaître, aged forty-two, has lived for eighteen months with his wife and a domestic servant at the second floor apartment with an annual rent of 2,000 francs. Previously he lived at rue de Pelouze. Mr Albert Lemaître, whose family is very well known in Reims, was a champagne exporter, but the business was failing, resulting in serious domestic difficulties: for some time Madame Lemaître had been going through a divorce, refusing to continue with the marriage. During a violent scene last night, [Albert] Lemaître seized a revolver from a desk drawer and fired two shots at his wife who was mortally wounded in the heart. On hearing shooting the domestique ran in, but Lemaître had already taken the law into his own hands and fired a bullet into his head. He was transported in 'serious condition' to the Beaujon hospital. The victim's body was attended by her father and mother. Madame Lemaître, who had no children, was twenty-eight years old. / Un drame conjugal, qui a causé une vive émotion dans le quartier de la Madeleine, s'est déroulé hier soir, á sept heures, 61 rue de Miromesnil. Depuis dix-huit mois, M. Albert Lemaître, âgé de quarante-deux ans, précédemment installé 10 rue Pelouze, était venu habiter avec sa femme et une domestique, un appartement d'un loyer annual de 2,000 francs, situé au deuxième étage de cet immeuble. M. Albert Lemaître, dont la famille est très connue à Reims, s'occupait de l'exportation des vins de champagne à l'étranger, mais ses affaires n'étaient pas aussi brilliantes qu'il l'eût désiré, et il en était résulté de graves difficultés dans le ménage : depuis quelque temps Mme Lemaître était en instance de divorce et se refusait a continuer la vie commune. Au cours d'une scène violente, M. Lemaître saissait hier soir un revolver dans le tiroir d'un secrétaire, et en tirait successivement deux coups sur sa femme, qui tombait mortellement atteinte d'une baille dans la région du coeur. La domestique accourut au bruit des détonations, mais le mari meurtrier avait déjà tenté de se faire justice en sa tirant une balle dans la tête. Il a été transporté dans un état alarmant à l'hopital Beaujon. Le corps de la victime est veillé par son père et sa mère. Mme Lemaître, qui n'avait pas d'enfant, était âgée de vingt-huit ans.) (Note: Le Figaro Paris, 7 September 1906 states: Le Figaro Paris, 7 September 1906. Court Gazette. Court of Assizes of the Seine: Murderer of his wife. / Offline newspaper cutting Gazette des Tribunaux. Cour d'assises de la Seine: Meurtrier de sa femme.; Yesterday the Court of Assizes of the Seine had to judge a homicide case which was, in some respects, the simplest and most dramatic expression of the 'crime of passion'. The scenario summarised in a few lines: Miss Lucie Dumény had been engaged to her childhood friend Mr Bruyant, but for family reasons had to abandon her plans and marry Albert Lemaître. After four years of very happy marriage, Mrs Lemaître experienced a reawakening of her affections of yesteryear. Thus, despite the pleas from her husband, she sued for divorce to regain her freedom. Mr Lemaître confessed, perhaps exaggerated, that his wife was guilty of having relations with M. Bruyant, and that he killed her with revolver shots. Then he tried unsuccessfully to commit suicide. On hearing of the death of Madame Lemaître her lover killed himself with a revolver. Yesterday this drama brought Mr Albert Lemaitre to the Court of Assizes of the Seine, on charges of voluntary manslaughter. Before the Parisian jury Lemaître showed an attitude full of painful adjustment. The lawyer, Mr Dussyanne pleaded eloquently and read a letter that Lemaitre wrote to his wife a few days before the tragedy: My dear Lucie It has been ten long days since you left me, during which I have suffered martyrdom. I come on bended knees to beg you not to forsake me, give a little mercy to one who adores you and thinks constantly of you, night and day. I know that you are capable of doing the right thing, I hope that your generosity will not make me endure the suffering in which I am immersed for too long. As I said yesterday, I accept in advance all the conditions that you put on me, but what I ask of you is pity for one who dies of grief at being separated from that which is his life. I hope that you will not let me execute the fatal project that I have in mind, and if I do then you will grant me, before dying, one last kiss. I will carry the memory of being with you, the only purpose of my life. Think ahead to the pain that our families feel at this sad end. My best kisses ..... Signed: Albert When the jury returned a verdict of innocent the audience applauded. / La cour d'assises de la seine a eu à juger, hier, une affaire d'homicide constituant en quelque sorte le crime passionel type dans sa plus simple et plus dramatique expression. Le scénario, totalement dénué de complications, tient en quelques lignes : fiancée à M. Bruyant, un ami d'enfance, Mlle Lucie Dumény dut, pour des raisons de famille, abandonner ses projets matrimoniaux et épouser M. Albert Lemaître. Après quatre années de mariage fort heureuses, Mme Lemaitre se retrouvait en présence de son ancien fiancé pour lequel elle sentait se réveiller son affection d'antan. Dès lors, la jeune femme songea à intenter un procès en divorce, pour reconquérir sa liberté. Malgré les supplications de son mari, elle mit ce projet à exécution. M. Lemaître, sur l'aveu, peut-être exagéré, que lui fit sa femme de relations coupable avec M. Bruyant, tua cette dernière à coups de revolver. Puis il tenta vainement de se suicider. Quant à l'amant, au récit de la mort de Mme Lemaître, il se tua d'un coup de revolver. Tel est le drame qui amenait, hier, M. Albert Lemaître devant la Cour d'Assises de la Seine, sous l'accusation d'homicide volontaire. Devant les jurés parisiens, M. Albert Lemaître a eu une attitude pleine de correction douloureuse. Son avocat, Me Dussyanne, a, au cours de son éloquente plaidoire, donné lecture de cette lettre éplorée que, quelques jours avant le drame, M. Lemaître avait adressée à sa femme : Ma chère Lucie, Voila dix longs jours que tu m'as abandonné, durant lesquels j'ai souffert le martyre. Je viens te supplier à genoux de ne pas m'abandonner dans la vie et d'accorder un peu de pitié à celui qui t'adore et ne cesse de penser à toi nuit et jour. Te connaissant capable d'un bon mouvement, j'espère que ta générosité ne me fera pas endurer trop longtemps les souffrances dans lesquelles je suis plongé, en t'ayant près de moi. Comme je te l'ai dit hier, j'accepte d'avance toutes les conditions que tu m'imposeras, mais ce que j'implore de toi c'est de la pitié pour celui qui meurt de chagrin d'être séparé de celle qui est toute sa vie. J'espére que tu ne me laisseras pas mettre à exécution le funeste projet que j'ai en tête, et si, par malheur, j'en arrivais là, tu m'accorderas, avant de mourir, un dernier baiser. J'emporterai de toi le souvenir de l'être qui aura été pour moi le seul but de la vie. Réfléchis bien, à la douleur que nos deux familles ressentiront à cette triste fin. Reçois les meilleurs baisers de celui qui va bientôt s'éteindre en pensant à celle qu'il adore. Signé : Albert Sur un verdict négatif du jury, la Cour a, aux applaudissements de l'auditoire, acquitté M. Albert Lemaître.)

== Car racing ==
=== 1894 – Paris to Rouen ===
On 22 July 1894, Pierre Giffard organised what is considered to be the world's first competitive motoring event from Paris to Rouen to publicise his newspaper, Le Petit Journal. (Note: A previous motoring event had been held in 1887 but received only a single entrant. Georges Bouton and his passenger the Comte Jules-Albert de Dion had completed the 2 mile drive from the Bois de Boulogne to Porte Maillot in a steam powered vehicle of their own manufacture, the genesis of the De Dion-Bouton.) The paper promoted it as a Competition for Horseless Carriages (Concours des Voitures sans Chevaux) that were not dangerous, easy to drive, and cheap during the journey. The 'easy to drive' clause precluded the use of a travelling mechanic or technical assistant, thereby making steam-powered vehicles ineligible for the main prize.

Lemaître completed the 50 km (31 mi) qualification event on Friday 20 July, driving from Paris to Mantes-la-Jolie via Bezons, Houilles and Maisons-Laffitte. The 126 km (78 mi) main race from Paris to Rouen started from Porte Maillot and went through the Bois de Boulogne, Neuilly-sur-Seine, Courbevoie, Nanterre, Chatou, Le Pecq, Poissy, Triel-sur-Seine, Vaux-sur-Seine, and Meulan, to Mantes where he held first place with the best time 2 hours 36 minutes when they stopped for lunch from 12:00 until 13:30. Lemaître completed the final 80 kilometre section via Vernon, Eure, Gaillon, Pont-de-l'Arche, to the 'Champ de Mars' at Rouen in 4 hours 15 minutes. Lemaître and his 3 passengers took 6 hours 51 minutes 30 seconds to reach Rouen in his 3 hp Peugeot Type 7, the first petrol-powered car to finish, 13 minutes ahead of Auguste Doriot (Peugeot). The fastest vehicle, and the first home, was the steam-powered De Dion-Bouton driven by the Comte Jules-Albert de Dion, but was ineligible for the main prize because it needed a stoker, a technical assistant.

=== 1897 ===
On 29–31 January 1897 Lemaître finished second in the 'Marseilles–Nice–La Turbie' race driving a Peugeot. He completed the 240 km (150 mi) event in 8 hours 7 minutes 27 seconds, an average speed of 25.59 km/h (15.90 mph).

On 24 July 1897 he finished 20th in the Paris–Dieppe Trail driving a Peugeot. He completed the 170 km (110 mi) event in 5 hours 27 minutes 46 seconds, an average speed of 31.19 km/h (19.38 mph).

On 14 August 1897 he finished 3rd in the Paris–Trouville Trail, driving a Peugeot. He completed the 173 km (107 mi) event in 4 hours 17 minutes 40 seconds, an average speed of 40.42 km/h (25.12 mph).

=== 1898–1899 ===
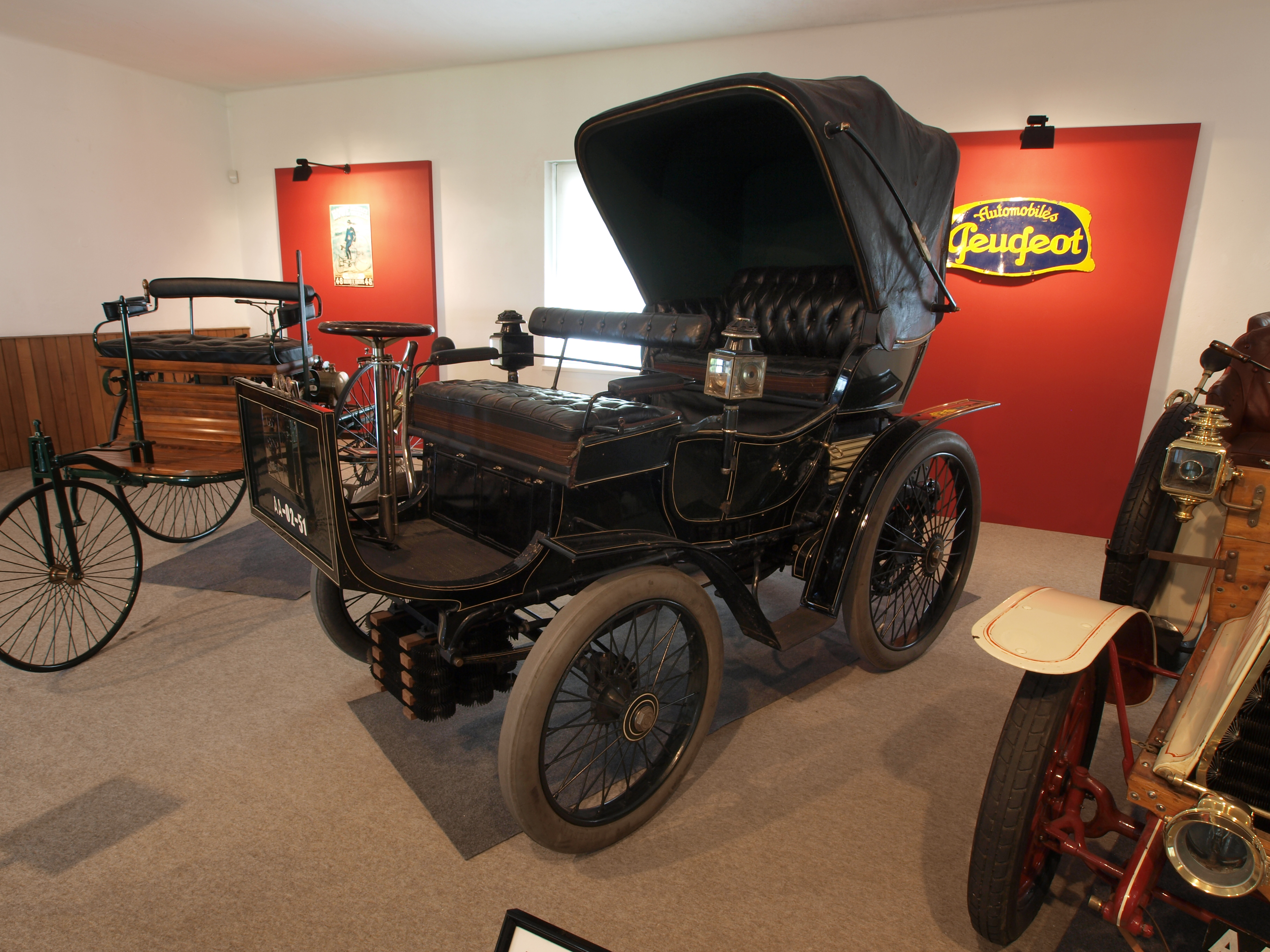
An 1899 Peugeot, – Tipo 19 5hp, 1056cc,

On 21 August 1898 he finished 3rd in the Bordeaux-Biarritz Trail, driving a Peugeot. He completed the 292 km (181 mi) event in 8 hours 4 minutes at an average speed of 36.19 km/h (22.49 mph).

On 21 March 1899 Lemaître won the Nice–Castellane–Nice race driving a Peugeot. He completed the 120 km (75 mi) in 2 hours 52 minutes 50 seconds, an average speed of 41.87 km/h (26.02 mph). He was driving the latest version of rear engined, two cylinder, (140 mm bore x 190 mm stroke) Peugeot, in which he also achieved a standing start mile in 1 minute 35 seconds.

On 24 March 1899 Lemaître won the La Turbie Hill climb in 24 minutes 23 seconds in the new 17 h.p. Peugeot.

On 6 April 1899 he won the Pau-Bayonne-Pau race in a 10 hp Peugeot. He completed the 206 km (128 mi) event in 3 hours 57 minutes 36 seconds, an average speed of 52.155 km/h (32.408 mph).

On 1 September 1899 he finished 3rd in the Paris–Ostende race driving a Peugeot. He completed the 323 km (201 mi) event in 6 hours 32 minutes, an average speed of 49.44 km/h (30.72 mph).

=== 1901–1902 ===
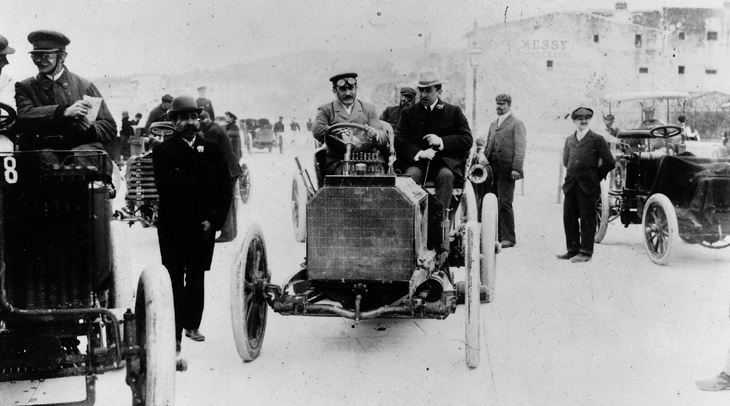
Albert Lemaître with a 40 hp Mercedes Simplex at 1902 Nice–La Turbie mountain race

On 25 March 1901 he drove a Mercedes in the 392 km (244 mi) Nice-Salon-Nice event, but failed to finish.

On 27–29 June 1901 he finished 28th in the Paris-Berlin Trail (Subsequently, named VI Grand Prix de l'A.C.F.) driving a Mercedes. He completed the 1,105 km (687 mi) event in 23 hours 9 minutes 53 seconds, an average speed of 47.73 km/h (29.66 mph).

On 7 April 1902, during Nice week, Lemaître finished second in the 'Nice–La Turbie mountain race driving a 40 hp Mercedes Simplex during its first competitive event. He was competing in the category for racing cars weighing more than 1000 kg.
