= Car body style =

Aspect of motor vehicle design

There are many types of car body styles. They vary depending on intended use, market position, location, and the era they were made.

== Current styles ==
Style	Description	Example image
Buggy	Lightweight off-road vehicle with sparse bodywork. Originally two- or four-wheeled carriages in the 19th and early 20th centuries pulled by one horse, the motorized buggies were developed in the 1960s and grew in popularity and diversity.	Volkswagen Country Buggy
Convertible / cabriolet	Has a retractable or removable roof. A convertible allows an open-air driving experience, with the ability to provide a roof when required. Most convertible roofs are either a folding textile soft-top or a retractable metal roof. Convertibles with a metal roof are sometimes called 'retractable hardtop', 'coupé convertible', or 'coupé cabriolet'.	Chrysler Sebring JS convertible with top down
Coupé	Two-door car, seating up to four persons. Some two-door cars have only two seats, thus two-seaters.	1987 Cadillac Coupe Deville
Coupe SUV	Type of SUV with a sloping roofline similar to fastback cars, That is often adopted to offer a styling advantage compared to standard SUVs. Manufacturers often sell them as more premium models than their standard SUV counterparts.	first-generation BMW X6
Crossover / crossover SUV / crossover utility vehicle (CUV)	Vehicle with a higher ground clearence and larger space, That is built in a unibody platform shared with standard cars. Originally a North American term used for vehicles that blend characteristics between two types, it evolved to be a term for SUVs built in a unibody chassis, Even though the term SUV is used to refer both to crossovers and standard SUVs due to their visual similarities.	Hyundai Santa Fe
Fastback	Car with a roofline that slopes continuously down at the back. The design features a single unbroken convex curve from the roof to the rear.	Porsche 356
Flower car	Used in the U.S. in the funeral industry to carry flowers for burial services. Typically a coupé-style, forward-passenger compartment with an open well in the rear.	Cadillac Flower car
Hatchback	Car with a hatch-type rear door that is hinged at the roof and opens upwards. The term "hatchback" can also refer to that type of rear door, which is also used on several sports cars, SUVs, and large luxury cars.	Renault Clio hatchback
Hearse / funeral coach	The modification of a passenger car to provide a long cargo area for carrying a coffin or casket. Hearses often have large glass panels for viewing the coffin.	Cadillac Hearse
Crossover sedan/High Riding Sedan	A vehicle that combines characteristics and styling of a sedan with a higher ground clearance, Similar to a crossover.	Toyota Crown Crossover
Kammback / kamm tail / K-tail	A car where the rear slopes downwards before being abruptly cut off with a vertical or near vertical surface. This reduces the aerodynamic drag, improving the efficiency, while the stil keeping its traditional shape.	1969 Fiat 850 Coupe Kammback
Liftback	Variant of a hatchback where the roof line and the rear cargo door are more horizontal than vertical.	1973 Toyota Celica liftback
Limousine	A luxury-type vehicle that is typically driven by a chauffeur with a partition between the driver's compartment and the passenger's compartment. Limousines may also be stretched to provide more room in the rear passenger compartment. In some European usage, the word describes a regular four-door sedan body style.	Lincoln Stretch Limousine
Microvan	The smallest size of minivan/MPV.	Daihatsu Hijet microvan
Minivan / multi-purpose vehicle (MPV) / people carrier / people mover	Vehicle designed to transport passengers in the rear seating row(s) with reconfigurable seats in two or three rows. Typically has a combined passenger and cargo area, a high roof, a flat floor, a sliding door for rear passengers, and high H-point seating. In Europe, some small minivans have been marketed as 'leisure activity vehicles'.	Toyota Sienna minivan
Notchback	A vehicle with a distinctive rear section, where the rear of the passenger cabin slopes down toward the top of the area typically used as the cargo compartment.	VW Type 3 notchback
Panel van / car-derived van / sedan delivery	A cargo vehicle based upon passenger car chassis and typically has one row of seats with no side windows at the rear. A panel van is smaller than a panel truck or cargo van and is often built on a car platform.	Austin 35 van
Panel truck	A panel truck is a larger version of the panel van and is often built on a heavier platform.	1940s Dodge panel truck in Australia
Pickup truck / pickup	A light-duty, open-bed truck. In South Africa, a pickup truck is called a "bakkie".	Ford F-150 Lariat SuperCrew
Roadster	An open two-seat car with emphasis on sporting appearance or character. Initially, an American term for a two-seat car with no weather protection, usage has spread internationally and has evolved to include two-seat convertibles.	BMW Z3 roadster
Sedan / saloon	A fixed-roof car in a three-box design. These form separate compartments for engine, passenger, and cargo. Sedans can have two or four doors. A sedan is called a "berlina" in Spanish and Italian, or a "berline" in French.	Toyota Camry sedan
Shooting-brake	Initially, a horse-drawn vehicle used to carry shooting parties with their equipment and game; subsequently synonymous with station wagon / estate car; and in contemporary usage a three- or five-door wagon combining features of a station wagon and a coupé.	Volvo 1800 ES
Sport Utility Vehicle / SUV	Type of vehicle that combines characteristics of a passenger car with an offroad vehicle, like higher ground clearence and four wheel drive.	Toyota Land Cruiser SUV
Station wagon / estate car	Has a two-box design, a large cargo area, and a rear tailgate that is hinged to open for access to the cargo area. The body style is similar to a hatchback car; however, station wagons are longer and are more likely to have the roofline extended to the rear of the car (resulting in a vertical rear surface to the car) to maximize the cargo space. In French, a station wagon is called a "break".	Buick Roadmaster station wagon
Targa top	A semi-convertible style used on some sports cars, featuring a fully removable soft or hard roof panel that leaves the A and B pillars in place on the car body.	Porsche 911 Targa
Ute / coupe utility	Based on a passenger sedan chassis and has a cargo tray in the rear integrated with the passenger body (as opposed to a pickup truck, which has a separate cargo tray). In Australia, the term "ute" was originally used solely for coupé utility cars; however, in recent years, it has also been used for pickup trucks.	Holden Ute VF MY14 SV6 Utility

== Historic styles ==
Style	Description	Example image
Baquet	Has two rows of raised seats, similar to horse-drawn carriages; usually did not have front doors, a roof, or a windshield. The baquet ("bathtub") style was produced in the early 1900s in Europe. Also a marketing term used on cars built in the United States in the 1920s and 1930s.	
Barchetta	Italian two-seat sports car with either an open-top or convertible roof. The term was originally used for lightweight open-top racing cars from the late 1940s through the 1950s. Since the 1950s, the name barchetta ("little boat" in Italian) has been revived on several occasions, mostly for cars with convertible roofs that are not specifically intended for racing.	Ferrari 550 Barchetta Pininfarina
Berlinetta	Italian sports coupé, typically with two seats but also including 2+2 cars. The original meaning for berlinetta in Italian is "little saloon."	Ferrari 250GT Berlinetta SWB
Cabrio coach	A retractable textile roof, similar to a convertible/cabriolet. The difference is that where a convertible often has the B-pillar, C-pillar, and other bodywork removed, the cabrio-coach retains all bodywork to the top of the door frames and just replaces the roof skin with a retractable fabric panel. Some modern cars, such as the Fiat 500 (2007), featured this body style.	A Ford Eifel cabrio coach
Coupé de ville / Sedanca de ville / town car	An external or open-topped driver's position and an enclosed compartment for passengers. Produced from 1908 until 1939. Although the different terms may have once had specific meanings for certain car manufacturers or countries, the terms are often used interchangeably. Some coupé de villes have the passengers separated from the driver in a fully enclosed compartment, while others have a canopy for the passengers and no partition between the driver and the passengers (therefore passengers enter the compartment via the driver's area).	1925 Hispano-Suiza Type H.6
Hardtop	Usually describes pillarless hardtops that are cars without a B-pillar often styled to give the appearance of a convertible. Popular in the United States from the mid 1950s through the mid 1970s. It also refers to a separate top that is removable and made of metal or other hard material for sports cars or small SUVs.	1963 Rambler American two-door hardtop
Landaulet	A car where the rear passengers are covered by a convertible top. Often the driver is separated from the rear passengers with a partition, as per a limousine.	1966 Rolls-Royce Phantom V State Landaulet
Personal luxury car	American luxury coupés and convertibles produced from 1952 to 2007. The cars prioritized comfort, styling, and a high level of interior features.	1989 Buick Riviera personal luxury car
Phaeton	An open-roof automobile without any fixed weather protection, which was popular from the 1900s until the 1930s.	1897 Daimler Grafton phaeton
Roadster utility	An open-topped roadster body and a rear cargo bed.	1937 Willys Roadster utility
Runabout	A light, inexpensive, open car with basic bodywork and no windshield, top, or doors. Most runabouts had just a single row of seats, providing seating for two passengers.	1903 Oldsmobile Curved Dash Runabout
Torpedo	Body style was a type of automobile body used from 1908 until the mid-1930s, which had a streamlined profile and a folding or detachable soft top. The design consists of a hood or bonnet line raised to be level with the car's waistline, resulting in a straight beltline from front to back.	1914 Humber 11 torpedo
Touring	A style of open car built in the United States that seats four or more people. The style was popular from the early 1900s to the 1930s.	1913 Maxwell Model 24-4 touring car

== See also ==
- Automotive design
- Car classification
- Car model
- Vehicle size class
- Car body configurations
