= Peugeot Type 6 =

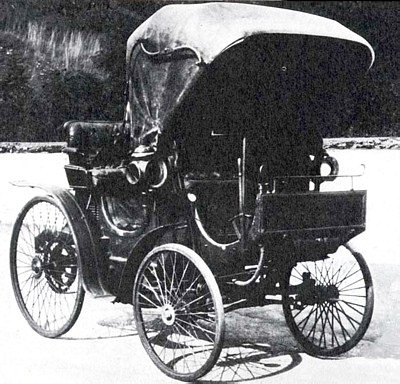

Overview
- Manufacturer: S. A. des Automobiles Peugeot
- Production: 1894 – 7 units produced

Body and chassis
- Layout: RR layout

Powertrain
- Engine: 0.6 L V-twin

Dimensions
- Wheelbase: 1.65 metres (65 in)

Chronology
- Predecessor: Peugeot Type 5
- Successor: Peugeot Type 7

The Peugeot Type 6 was the ordinally last Peugeot vehicle to carry over the tired 2-hp 565 cc V-twin from the earliest Peugeot models. It was larger than the Type 5 and offered for 1894 only. A mere 7 units were built and sold, of which one survives in Louwman's museum in the Netherlands.
