= Peugeot Type 21 =

Overview
- Manufacturer: Peugeot
- Production: 1898–1901

Body and chassis
- Class: small car
- Layout: RR layout

Dimensions
- Wheelbase: 1,650 mm (65 in)

The Peugeot Type 21 is an early motor vehicle produced between 1898 and 1901 by the French auto-maker Peugeot at their Audincourt plant. Nine were produced.

The vehicle was powered by a rear-mounted two-cylinder four-stroke engine, manufactured by Peugeot themselves. The two cylinders were configured in parallel rather than in the V-format used in the first Petrol driven Peugeot, and above the rear axle to which it was linked by a chain-drive. A maximum output of between 5 and 8 hp (6 kW) of power was delivered to the rear wheels via a chain-drive mechanism.

The vehicle closely followed the format of the Peugeot Type 24 which appeared in the same year, but the wheelbase was extended from 1,380 mm (54.3 in) to 1,650 mm (65.0 in), which supported a vehicle length of 2,600 mm (102.4 in). The Type 21 featured a carriage format coupé body designed to accommodate up to four people. At that time a "coupé" automobile was broadly similar to a closed two-door carriage but without the horses. Whereas it would not be completely correct to refer it as a coupé, the design was indeed a "berline" body work as in horse drawn carriages. This marks the Type 21 to be the first motorized ICE brougham in the world. In the years to come, this design would evolve to become popular especially in the electrics and doctor coupés.

In 1900 Peugeot added the little Type 31 and Type 30 to their range. The Type 30 could be seen as an open-topped version of the Type 21. However, whereas only 9 Peugeot Type 21s were produced, the Type 30 reached a production level of 84 during a model life of approximately two years which coincided with a period of rapid expansion for the French auto industry taken as a whole.

== Sources and further reading ==
- Wolfgang Schmarbeck: Alle Peugeot Automobile 1890–1990. Motorbuch-Verlag. Stuttgart 1990. ISBN 3-613-01351-7
