= Musée de l'Aventure Peugeot =

Museum in France

Coordinates: 47°30′59″N 6°49′53″E

Museum of the Peugeot Adventure
- Musée de l'Aventure Peugeot

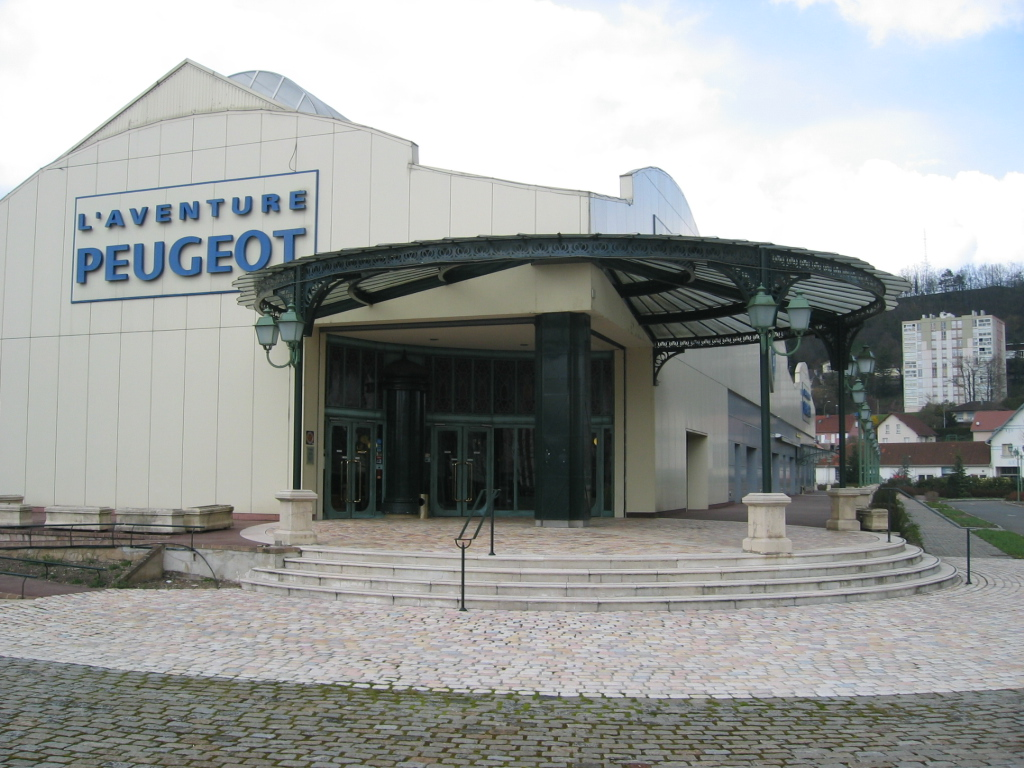
- Established: 1988; 38 years ago
- Location: Sochaux
- Collections: Peugeot automobiles
- Owner: Stellantis
- Website: laventure-association.com/peugeot/

The Musée de l'Aventure Peugeot (Museum of the Peugeot Adventure) is a historical museum devoted to the Peugeot automobile business. The museum was founded by members of the Peugeot family, opening in 1988 across the road from the company's huge industrial site at Sochaux.

The first Peugeot automobiles emerged in 1891. The museum presents a global view of the evolution of the Automotive industry virtually from its beginning. Peugeot products with longer pedigrees including bicycles are also represented along with the company's long history as a manufacturer of domestic articles and tools.

The museum is planning to welcome 85,000 visitors in 2010 (2009: 75,000) including approximately 25% from outside France. In the longer term the museum is set up to welcome 90,000 – 100,000 visitors annually, a rate approximately 25% ahead of the 1.6 million visitors recorded in total between 1988 and 2008.

== History ==
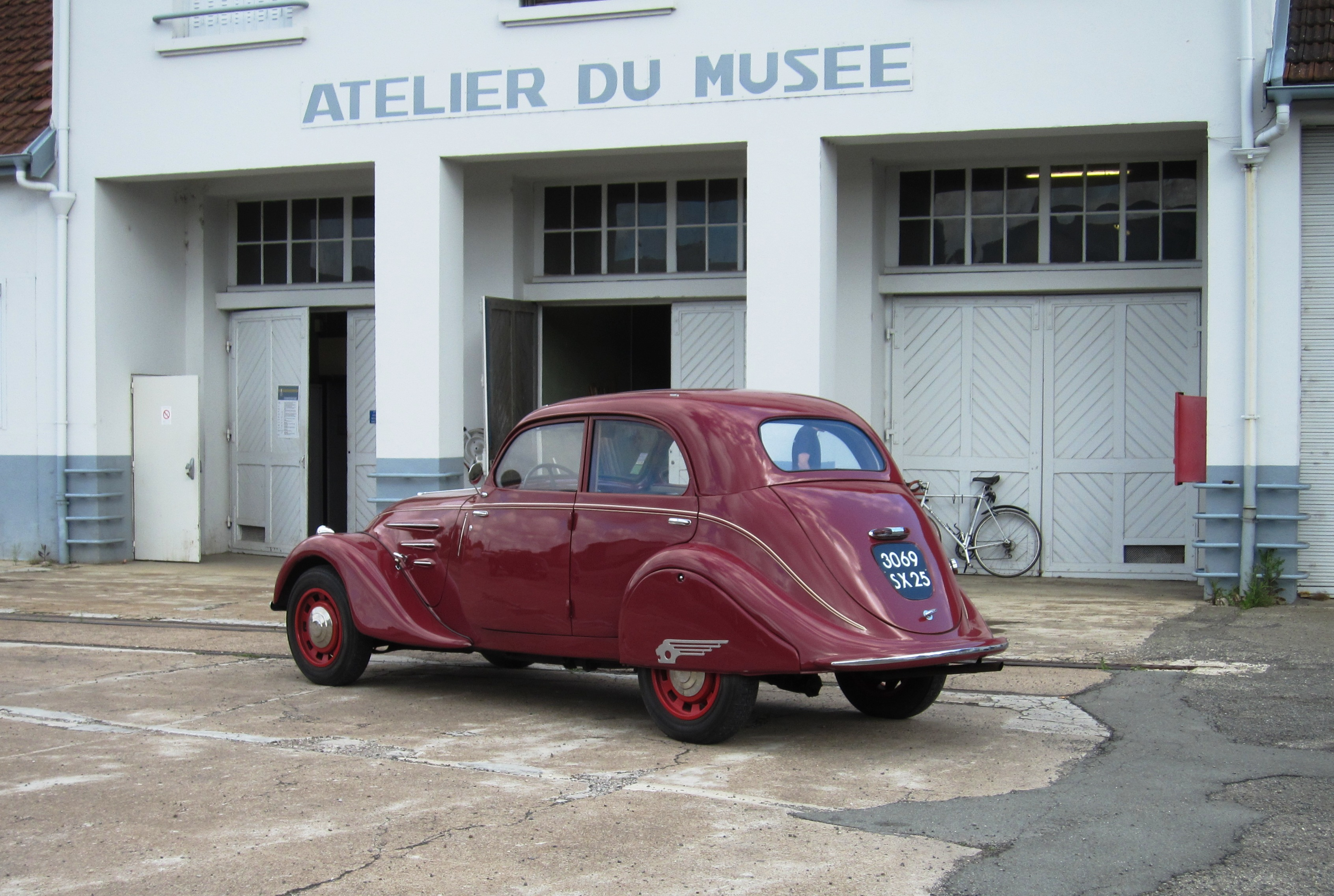
The museum has its own small workshop complex, directly on the north side of the museum site

In 1982 Pierre Peugeot, who at the time was president of the company's supervisory board, established a “l’Aventure Peugeot“ team, with the objective of gathering together items representative of the company's nearly two centuries of history. Old cars would form the core of the collection, but its scope would also extend to some of the family's other industrial activities.

In 1984 work started to convert a large workshop on the edge of the company's historic Sochaux site into a museum building to house the collection: this opened to the public in 1988. Progressive improvements continued and in 2000 the museum was extended across the area previously taken by the entire former building which tripled the floor-space of the display area.

The Peugeot business reached its 200th anniversary in May 2010, and to celebrate the museum benefited from a 1,500 m^{2} extension which increased by 35 to 130 the number of vehicles that can be exhibited at any one time. From 2008 visitors have been able to tour the museum using audio guides, and in 2010 the museum started a cautious roll-out of a “virtual visit” employing the flashcode proprietary technology, operable with a mobile telephone with the appropriate software installed. Initially the virtual tour involved just eight vehicles, but plans exist to extend it to cover every car in the museum.

== Statistics and highlights ==
- 450 vehicles of which approximately 130 are on display at any one time
- 300 cycles and motorcycles of which approximately 130 are on display at any one time
- 45 000 m² of exhibition space of which 10 000 m² are open to the public
- 5 km of archives

== Gallery ==
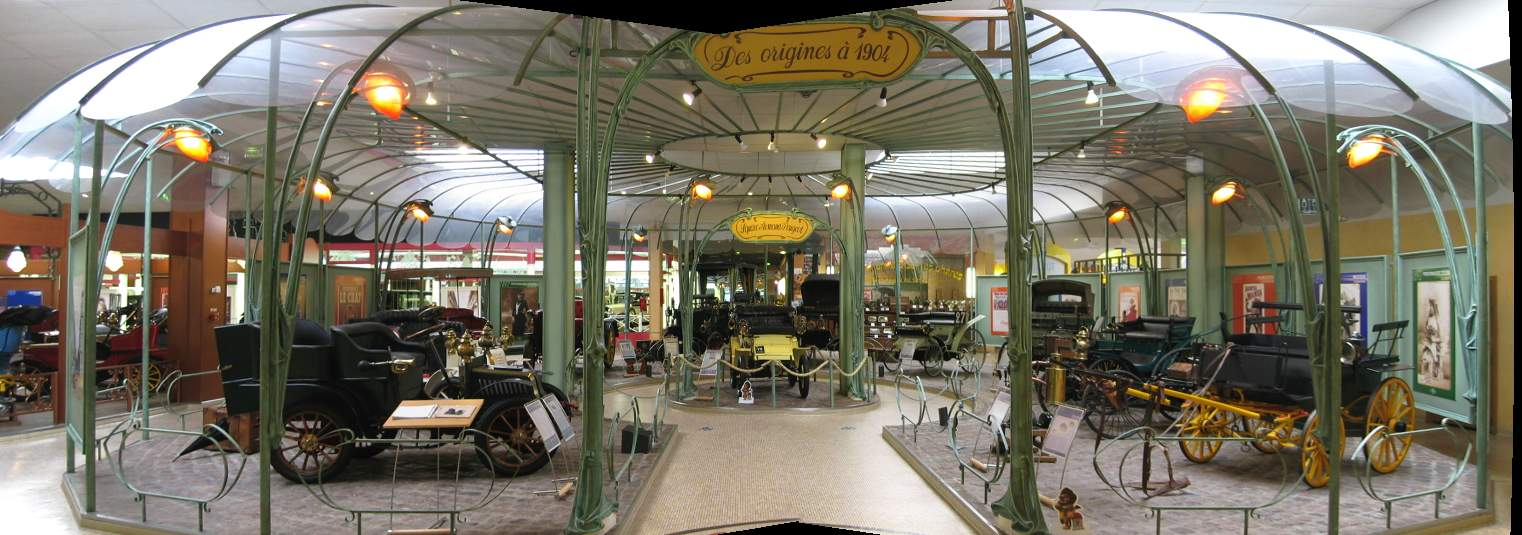
1904 automobiles exhibited

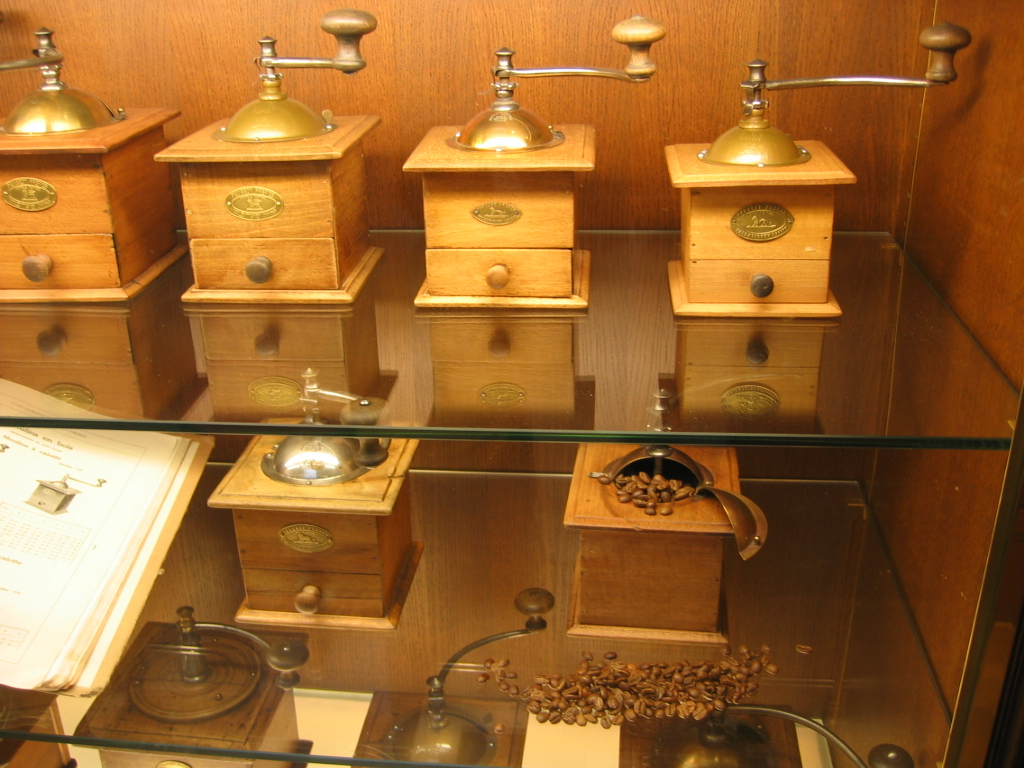
Peugeot coffee grinders

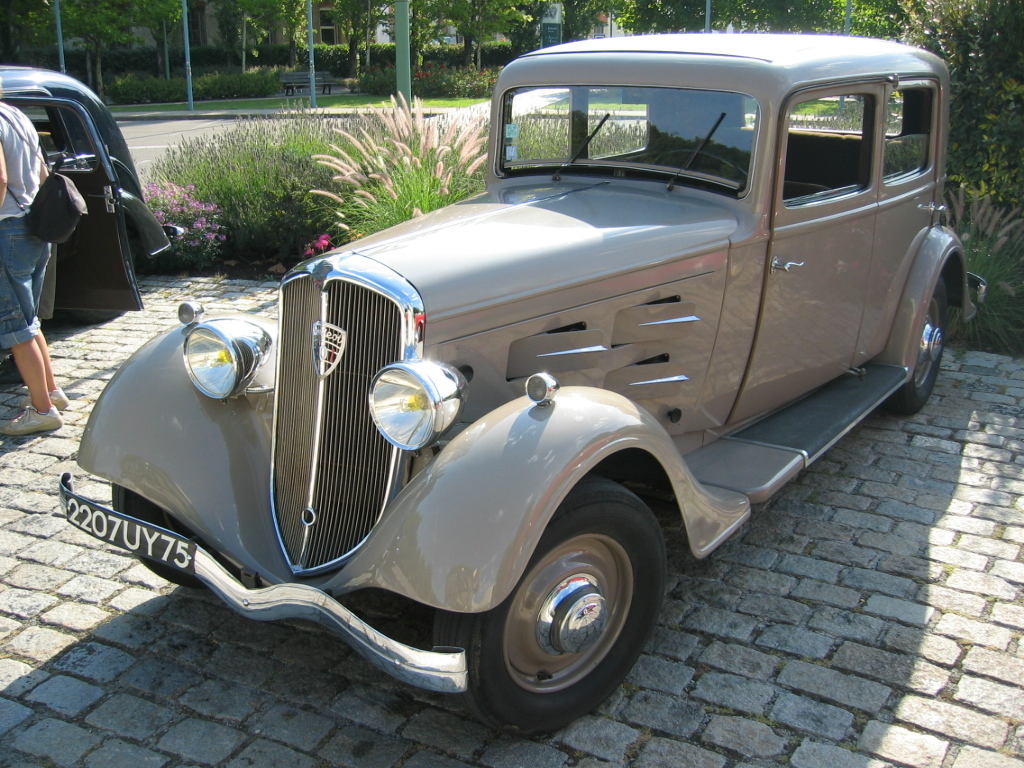
Peugeot 601

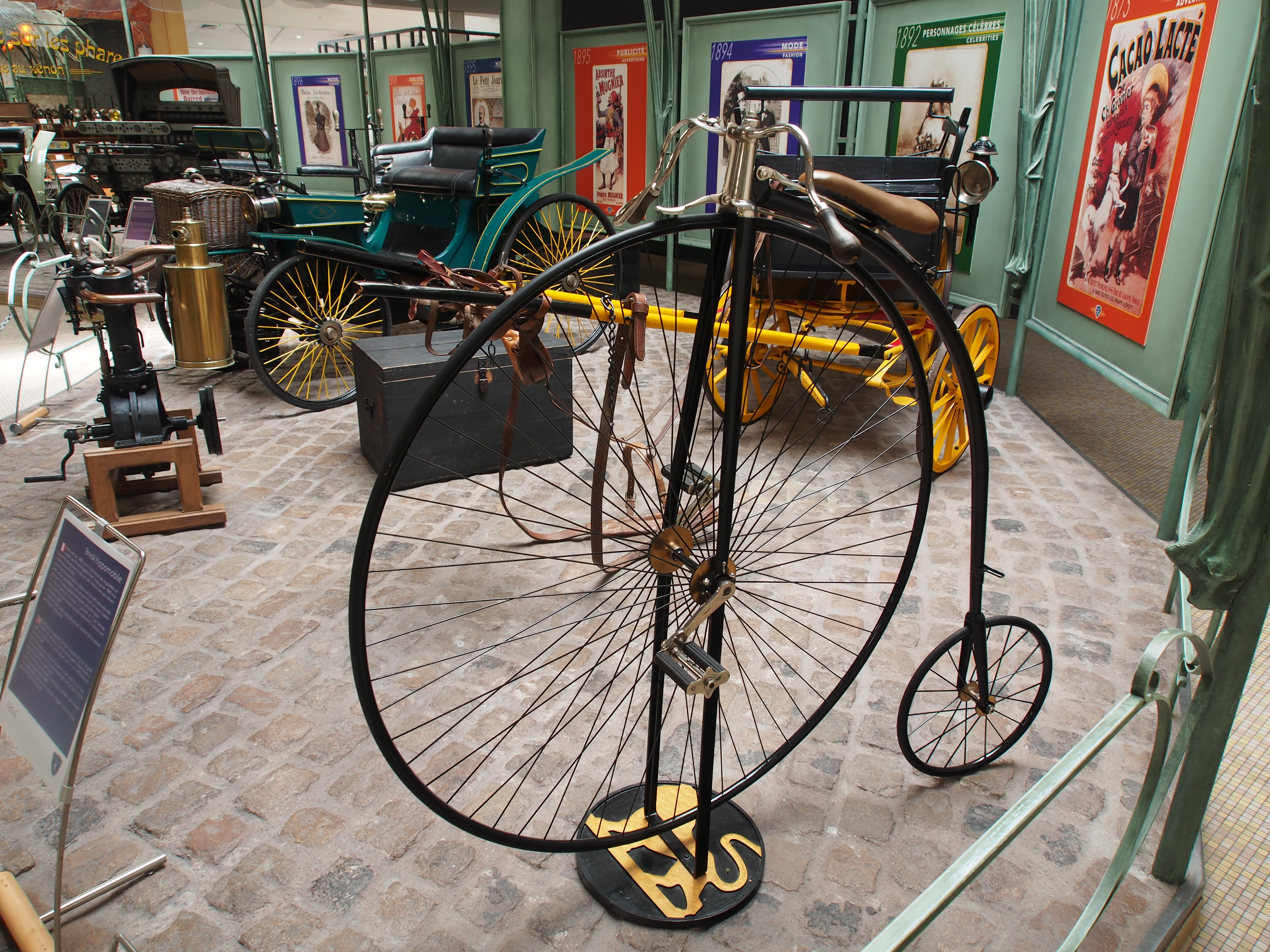
Peugeot bicycle

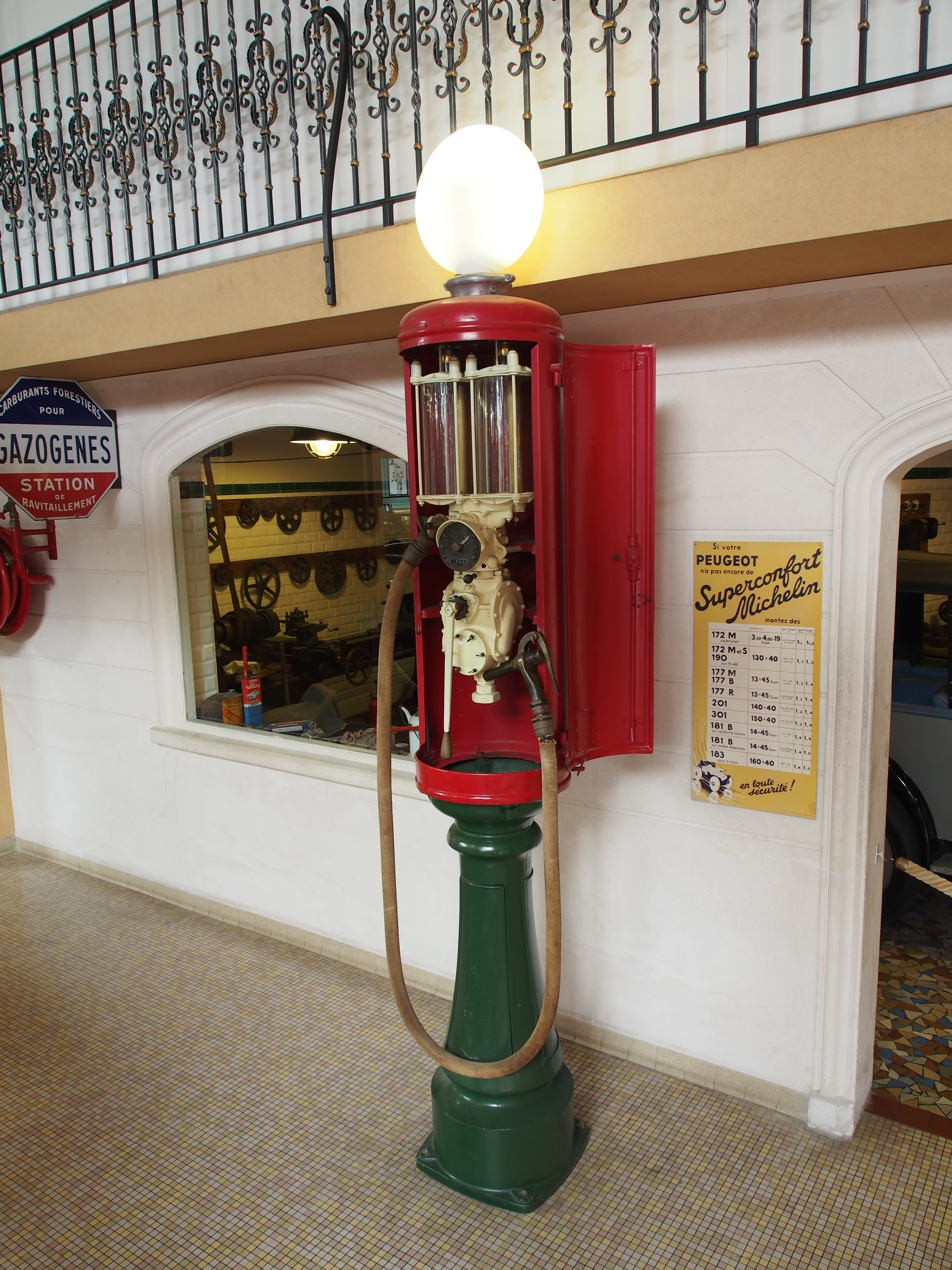
Gas pump

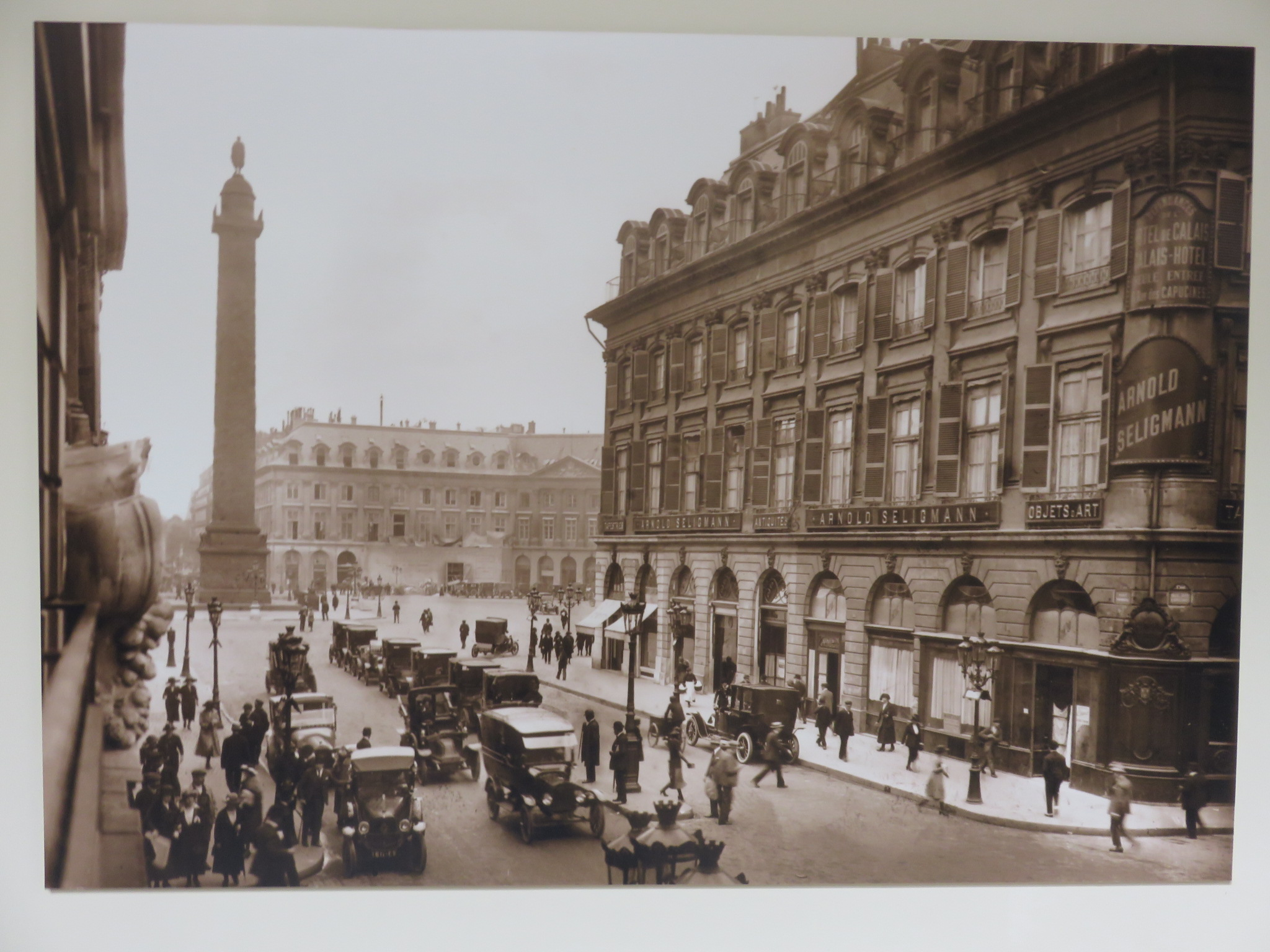
Place Vendôme in Paris 1920s
