= Break (carriage) =

Horse-drawn carriage

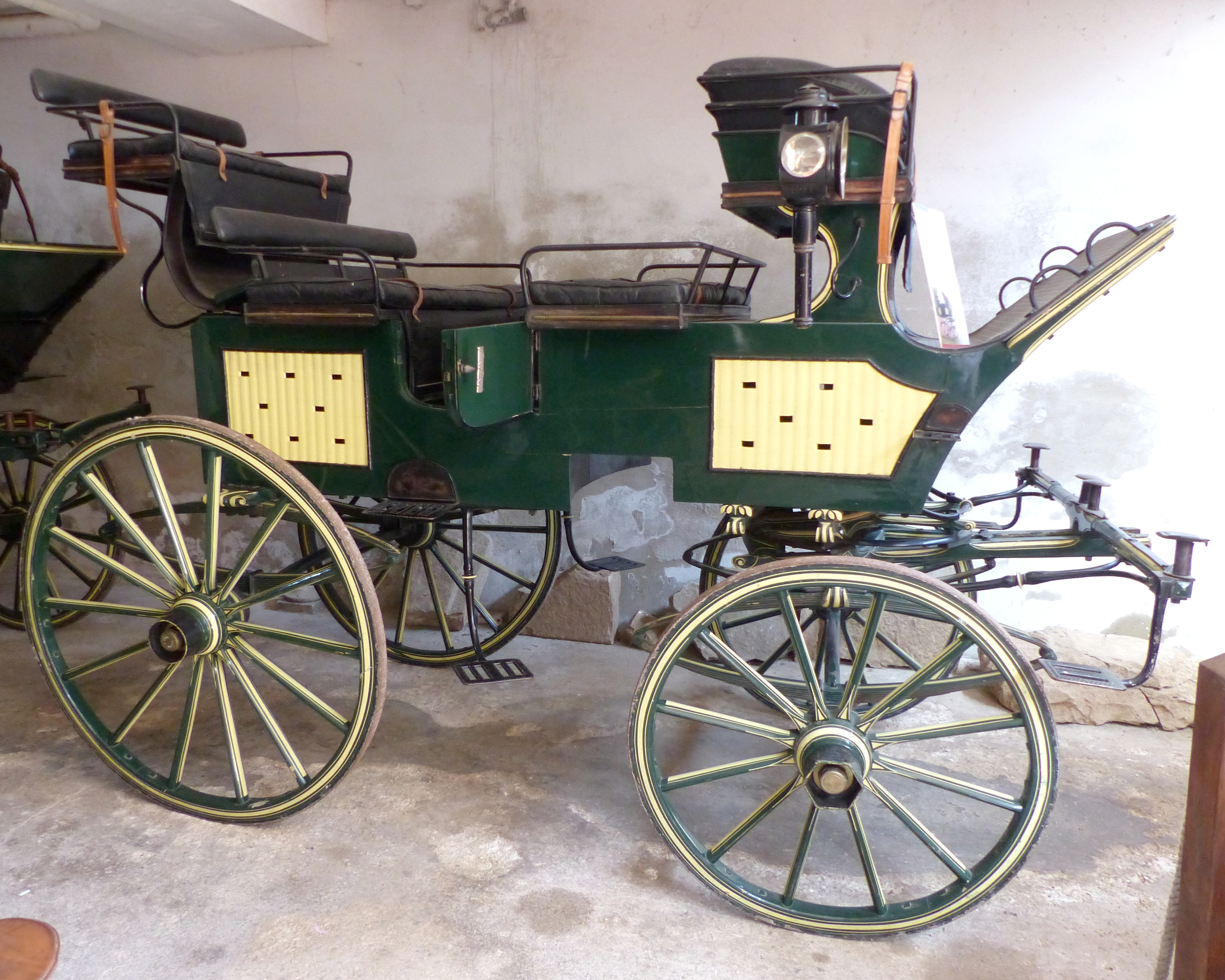
A hunting break from France

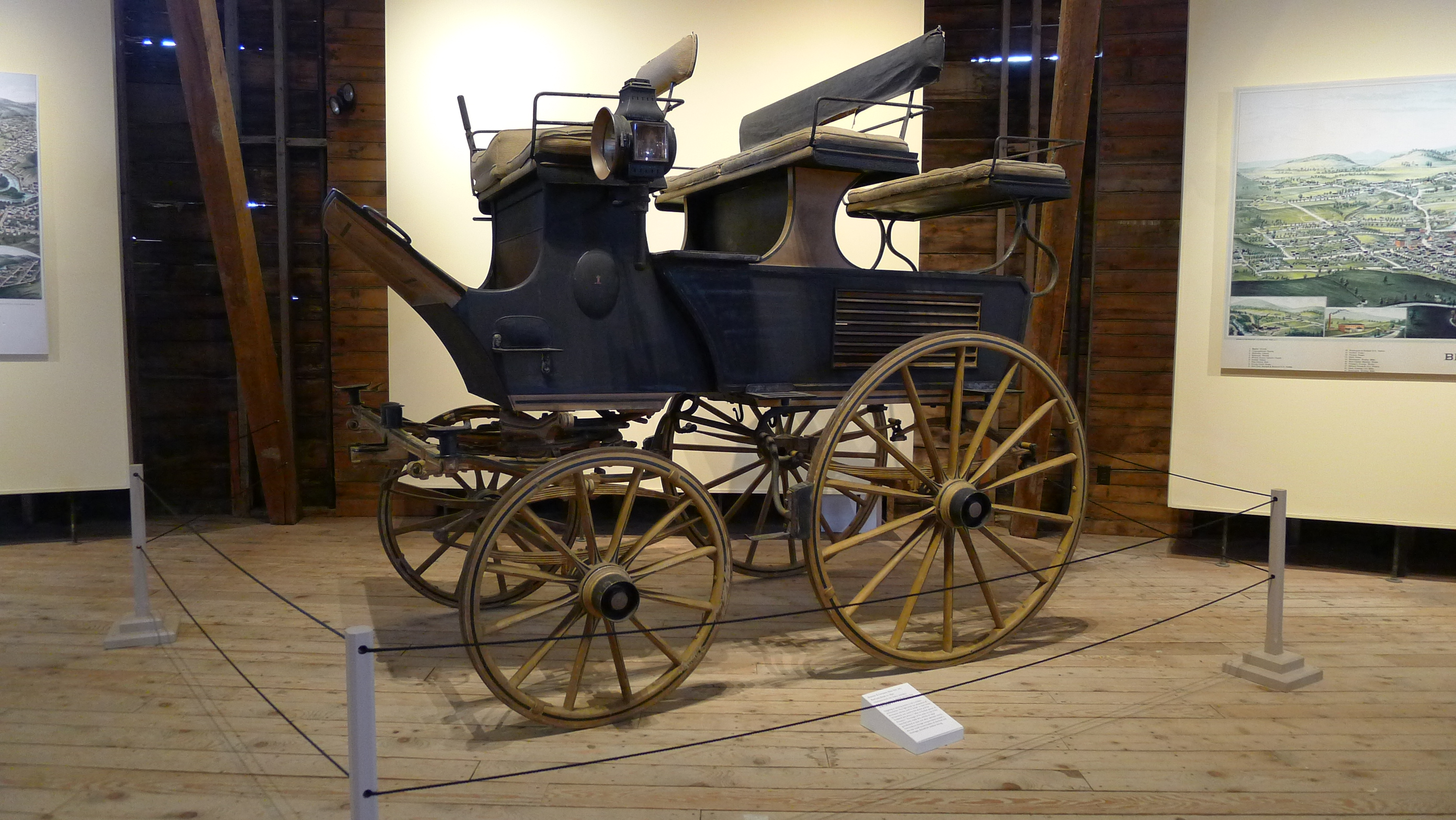
A roof-seat break by Brewster, c. 1890

A break or brake is an open horse-drawn carriage commonly used in the 19th and early 20th centuries. It is a heavy four-wheeled vehicle with a high seat for the driver, pulled by two or four horses. Originally, it was used to break young horses to drive or for exercise, so it did not have much body and was less finished than a formal carriage. Starting in the mid-1800s, the break became popular as a gentleman-driven (Note: Gentleman-driven: owner-driven as opposed to driven by a coachman or staff member who would have been those who broke, trained and exercised a gentleman's horses.) carriage and many variations appeared. Originally spelled break in England (from breaking horses), the spelling brake became common in the latter part of the 1800s and both spellings are used interchangeably.

== Types ==
- The skeleton break was used for training and was not much more than the undercarriage plus a seat. It was used with two horses, one younger horse and one more experienced horse to teach the young one to pull correctly.
- The body break, essentially a large wagonette, was a general purpose country vehicle. It added an extra one or two seats and was used to exercise horses or used at times when the road coach or drag would be too "dressy".
- The roof seat break had seating for six, drawn by a four-in-hand. Similar to a charabanc, it was so-named for the seating at the same level as sitting on the roof of a coach. Occasionally called a sporting break, it was used to transport groups of friends to sporting events such as horse races.
- The shooting break and hunting break carried a shooting party and their gun dogs and was drawn by a single horse or pair.
- The break vis-à-vis is a term used to describe a break vehicle in which has the center part has face-to-face seating.

There was no specific naming convention for carriage types, or from one country to another, or across time. Sometimes similar carriages had more than one name, or the same name might be used for two entirely dissimilar carriages. Carriages were named after their designer, builder, shape, or purpose. The word break or brake was one such carriage term that was widely used. As such, the above variations and descriptions are the main ones in general use without attempting to define every variant or diversity of use.

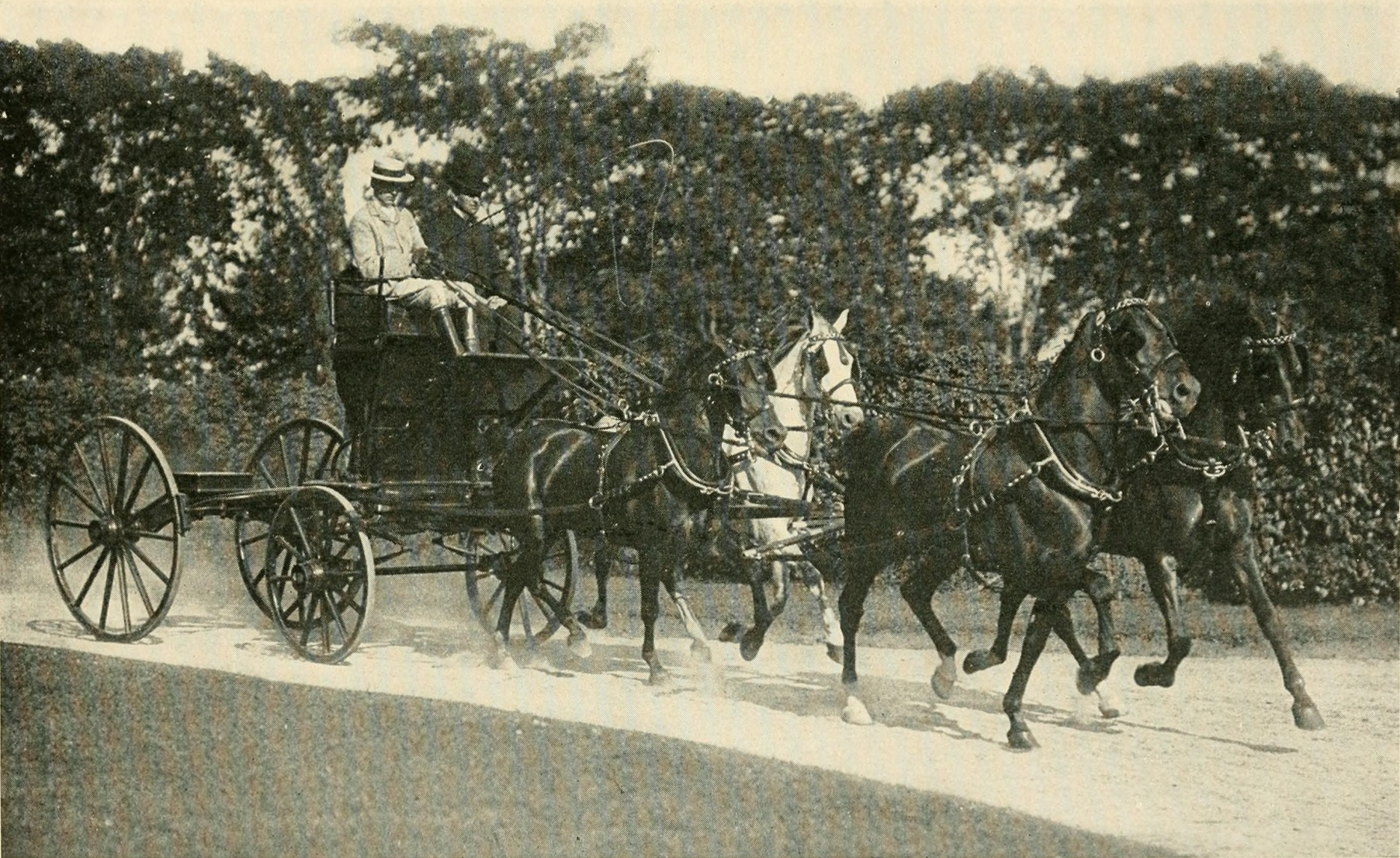
Skeleton break driven by Alfred G. Vanderbilt, c. 1902

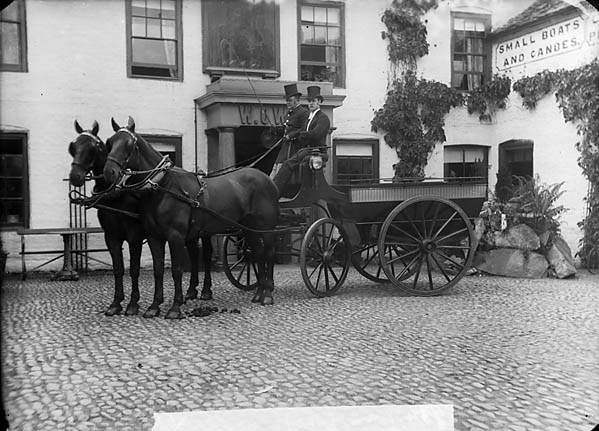
Body break, c. 1885

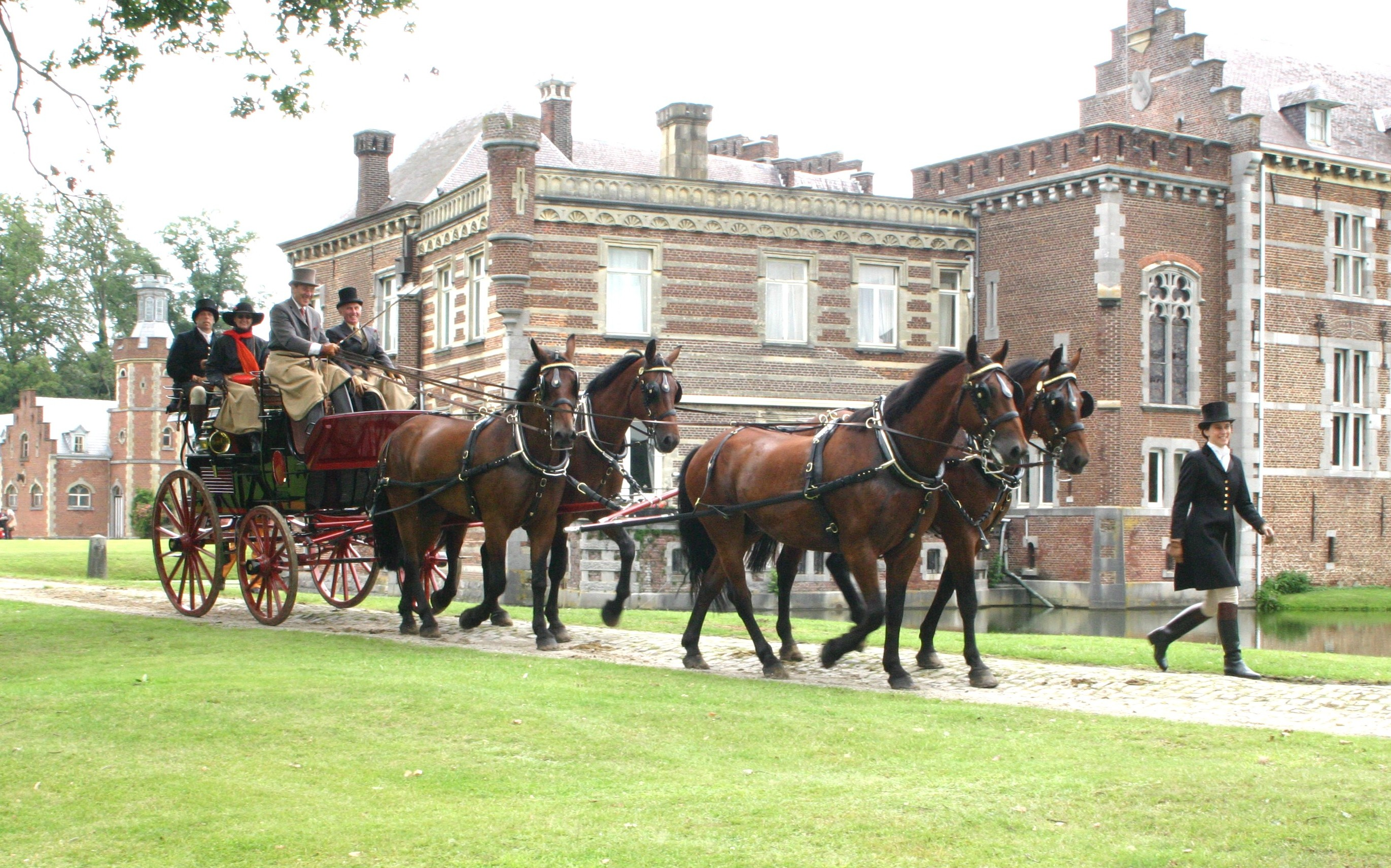
Roof seat break (Belgium, 2007)

== See also ==
- Shooting brake – Car body style
