= 1896 Paris–Marseille–Paris =

The Paris–Marseille–Paris race was the first competitive 'city to city' motor race originating in Paris, where the first car across the line was the winner, prior events having selected the winner by various forms of classification and judging. The race was won by Émile Mayade who completed the ten-day, 1,710 km, event over unsurfaced roads in 67 hours driving a Panhard et Levassor.

The event was organised by the Automobile Club de France (ACF) and was sometimes retrospectively known as the II Grand Prix de l'A.C.F.. It was run in 10 stages from Paris via Auxerre; Dijon; Lyon; Avignon; Marseille; Avignon; Lyon; Dijon; Sens and return to Paris.

== History ==
The first competitive 'city to city' motoring event had been the 1894 Paris–Rouen where the Count Jules-Albert de Dion was first into Rouen but steam-powered vehicles were ineligible for the main prize. Likewise, in 1895 the nascent Automobile Club de France) (ACF) organised its first event, the Paris–Bordeaux–Paris race, but excluded two-seater cars such that their official winner, a four-seater, finished 11 hours after Émile Levassor. The outcry resulting from the 1895 result lead the A.C.F. to organise the Paris–Marseille–Paris Trail as the first fully competitive motor race starting in Paris, where the first car across the line was the winner.

On 8 February 1896 the race was announced in La France Automobile, the second edition of the A.C.F.'s official magazine.

== Vehicles and entrants ==
The entry list included : seven De Dion-Boutons (5 gasoline-powered tricycles and 2 steam-powered cars); five Bollées (comprising four Léon Bollée tricycles and tandems plus an Amédée Bollée); four Panhard et Levassors; three Peugeots; two Delahayes; two Société Parisiennes and two Triouleyres. There were also single car entries from Fisson; Landry et Beyroux (or poss. Landoy); Lebrun; Rochet-Schneider; Rossel and Tissandier.

- Amédée Bollée drove his own 4 seater 'face to face' (vis-a-vis) model, equipped with a 2.3 litre, two-cylinder, air-cooled, petrol engine, which produced about 6 hp. It retired after completing the first stage to Auxerre but was notable for being the only entry with a steering wheel rather than a tiller.
- De Dion-Bouton entered five petrol-powered tricycles plus and two steam-powered cars. Viet finished in third place overall on his tricycle and won Class B, while Collomb (No. 51) and Delieuvin (No.15) rode their tricycles to finish fifth and ninth respectively. The tricycles of Chevalier (No. 52) and Boiron both retired on the second day. Neither of the steam-powered cars driven by Comté Jules-Albert de Dion and Comté Gaston de Chasseloup-Laubat (No. 14)completed the first stage.
- The Delahaye Group entered two petrol powered 4-seater vehicles which used two-cylinder, water-cooled, 2,513 cc engines rated at 6 hp. They were driven by Émile Delahaye and sporting pioneer Ernest Archdeacon who finished tenth and seventh respectively.
- Fisson entered a 4-seater car powered by a 4.5 hp Benz petrol engine and driven by Ferté, but it did not complete the first stage.
- Landry et Beyroux (de:M.L.B.)(Cie des Moteurs et Autos M.L.B.) entered a single car for Justin Landry with a rear-mounted, 5.5 hp, single cylinder engine. They had begun producing automobiles in 1894 at their works in Hondouville, Eure, France, and went on to trade as Cie des Moteurs et Autos M & B. from Passy-sur-Seine, but ceased production in 1902. Landry completed the race in 119 hours to finish in thirteenth place, 52 hours behind the overall winner.
- Lebrun entered a single car that Lebrun built himself, powered by a rear-mounted 4 hp Daimler petrol engine with twin cylinders in 'V' configuration. He completed 5 stages to reach Marseille before retiring.
- Léon Bollée entered four tricycle tandems fitted with a single cylinder, 641 cc delivering about 3 HP. To reduce weight and lower the centre of gravity the vehicle had no springs or suspension other than the Michelin tyres. Lejane's tricycle was the fastest participant, winning stage 1 at 31.9 km/hour, but then retiring on stage 2. Party persevered to finish fourteenth (last) in 141 hours, 74 hours behind the winning Panhard et Levassor of Émile Mayade. The other two Bollée tricycles of Camille Bollée and a.n.other also retired after stage 1.
- Four Panhard et Levassors were entered, two (race No. 5 of Émile Levassor and No. 8 of Merkel) were fitted with the 1895 Daimler Phoenix 4 HP (two-cylinder, 1206 cc) engines, whilst the other two had Panhard et Levassor's new design of 8 hp, 4-cylinder 2.4-litre engine. Car number 7 of P. Dubois was a 6-seater omnibus, and number 6 was a 4-seater driven by Émile Mayade to overall victory.
- Two Société Parisiennes (Parisienne Benz) were entered by Guyonnet and Charles Labouré and completed the course in 102 hours to record eleventh and twelfth places respectively. The cars were reportedly slightly modified Benz Viktorias, using a single cylinder, 2.9-litre, 4.5 hp petrol engine.
- Three petrol powered Peugeots were entered. Auguste Doriot drove No 44, a 4 hp, lightweight 2 seater phaeton shod with Michelin tyres, possibly a Type 7 or Type 8, using a new 2 cylinder 1,396 engine, and was classified eighth when he reached Paris after 81 hours and 23 minutes. Likewise Louis Rigoulot drove number 45, a similar chassis and engine but bodied as a 2-seater 'break', but retired after the first stage. The third Peugeot driven by Berlet (number 46), a heavy 5 seater "Wagonette" equipped with solid tires and an older Daimler engine, reached Paris in sixth position after 75 hours 26 minutes.
- Gaston Tissandier, chemist and adventurer, drove his own design of car with a petrol powered 4 hp engine. He retired after the first stage.
- Two Triouleyres were entered by the Compagnie Générale des Automobiles of Paris. The cars used a rear-mounted Benz single-cylinder petrol engine delivering 4.5 hp. Valentin retired after 2 stages whilst Estève failed to complete a single stage.

== Prologue - pre-selection ==
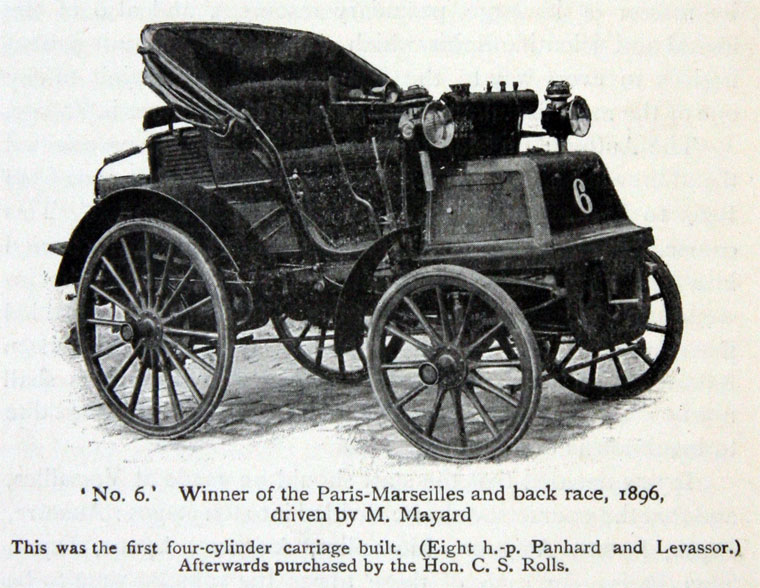
1896 - Panhard et Levassor of Émile Mayade - Winner of Paris-Marseilles-Paris. This new 4 cylinder model won seven of the ten stages in the hands of 3 different drivers.

On 20 September, the weekend prior to the start of the race, a selection trial (prologue) was run from Paris-Mantes-Paris for bicycles and tricycles of less than 150 kilograms. The eight successful machines were classified as either engine powered or engine and pedal powered. The two self-powered machines were the single seat, petrol-powered 'Wolfmüller' motorcycle (No 31) ridden by D'Ofraiville; and the Hurtu-Léon Bollée tricycle No. 50 of C. Chauveau. The pedal machines (mopeds) were all De Dion-Bouton tricycles ridden by Chevalier (No. 52); Delieuvin (No. 15); Clere (No. 51); Fernand Charron (No. 13); and Comte Laubat Gaston De Chasseloup (No. 14).

== The race ==
The race covered 1,710 km from Paris to Marseilles and return from 24 September-3 October 1896.

=== Daily itinerary ===
The race was scheduled to be run over 10 daily stages without rest days.

Stage	Date	Length	Itinerary
1	24 Sept	178 km	Paris, Versailles, Corbeil, Melun, Montereau, Sens, Joigny, Auxerre
2	25 Sept	151 km	Auxerre, Vermenton, Avallon, Vitteaux, Dijon
3	26 Sept	198 km	Dijon, Beaune, Chagny, Chalon-sur-Saône, Tournus, Mâcon, Villefranche-sur-Saône, Lyon
4	27 Sept	219 km	Lyon, Vienne, Saint Vallier, Valence, Montelimar, Orange, Avignon
5	28 Sept	101 km	Avignon, Orgon, Sénas, Salon de Provence, Aix en Provence, Marseille
6	29 Sept	101 km	Marseille, Aix en Provence, Salon-de-Provence, Sénas, Orogon, Avignon
7	30 Sept	219 km	Avignon, Orange, Montelimar, Valence, Saint Vallier, Vienne, Lyon
8	1 Oct	198 km	Lyon, Villefranche-sur-Saône, Mâcon, Tournus, Chalon-sur-Saône, Chagny, Beaune, Dijon
9	2 Oct	209 km	Dijon, Vitteaux, Avallon, Vermenton, Auxerre, Joigny, Sens
10	3 Oct	137 km	Sens, Montereau, Melun, Corbeil, Paris (Boulevard Maillot)

== On the road ==
The 32 entrants started the first stage from under the Place de l'Étoile in Paris and raced 177 km to Auxerre where the winner was Lejane who had driven his Bollée at over 31 km/hour. Unfortunately his glory was short lived as he retired the following day. The first of the Panhard et Levassors came to the fore on the second stage from Auxere to Dijon, when Émile Levassor covered the 150.95 km over unsurfaced roads in 6 hours 51 minutes, thus taking the overall lead. Levassor increased his lead by also winning the third stage into Lyon, but his race was ruined when he suffered an accident on the fourth stage into Avignon. Although he persevered until the end of the stage, he then handed over the driving to his riding mechanic Charles d'Hostingue and they continued steadily until the finishing fourth overall in Paris. Levassor would never fully recover from the accident and the stress of driving another 36 hours, and died early in 1897. The stage was won by Merkel driving another one of Émile Levassor's cars. The fifth stage into the halfway point at Marseille was won by Viet riding on a gasoline-powered De Dion tricycle, and he also won the next stage leaving Marseille back to Avignon. In a remarkable piece of symmetry Merkel again won the stage between Avignon and Lyon, a move that started Panhard et Levassor's dominant performance as Emile Mayade dominated the final three stages back to Paris and overall victory. Panhard et Levassor had won seven of the ten stages.

The winning 8 hp Panhard et Levassor of Mayade had been extensively upgraded for 1896, using their first four-cylinder engine, doubling the horsepower from the 1895 model. It was equipped with tiller steering and candle lamps. The brakes were a spoon-lever pressing on the solid rubber back tyre plus a belt that tightened onto a drum on the transmission.

== Results ==
Paris-Marseilles-Paris Trail - 24 September - 3 October 1896 – 1710 km

=== Summary ===
- Entrants - 31. (29 petrol/diesel/oil/gas; 2 steam) - 19 from class A1; 3 from class A2; 5 from class B2; and 4 from class C.
- Arrivals - 14. (14 petrol/diesel/oil/gas; 0 steam) - 9 from class A1; 1 from class A2; 3 from class B2; 1 from class C.
- Withdrawals - 16. (14 petrol/diesel/oil/gas; 2 steam) - 10 from class A1; 2 from class A2; 1 from class B2; 3 from class C.
- Suspended - 1. (1 petrol/diesel/oil/gas) - 1 from class B2.

=== Overall ===
The overall results were:

Pos	No	Driver	Car	Time	Notes
1	6	(France) Émile Mayade	Panhard et Levassor	67:42:58	Class A1
2	8	(France) Merkel	Panhard et Levassor	68:11:05	Class A1
3	13	(France) Paul Viet	De Dion-Bouton tricycle	71:01:05	Class B
4	5	(France) Émile Levassor (France) Charles d'Hostingue	Panhard et Levassor	71:23:22	Class A1. Levassor was injured on stage 4 so handed over to d'Hostingue at Avignon. He never recovered and died on 14 April 1897.
5	51	(France) Collomb	De Dion-Bouton (Michelin) tricycle	71:30:12	Class B
6	46	(France) Marius Berliet	Peugeot	75:26:24	Class A2
7	41	(France) Ernest Archdeacon	Delahaye	75:29:48	Class A1
8	44	(France) Auguste Doriot	Peugeot	81:23:51	Class A1
9	15	(France) Delieuvin	De Dion-Bouton tricycle	83:13:16	Class B
10		(France) Émile Delahaye	Delahaye	84:27:02	Class A1
11		(France) Guyonnet	Société Parisienne	102:41:45	Class A1
12		(France) Labouré	Société Parisienne	108:39:00	Class A1
13		(France) Justin Landry	Landry et Beyroux (M.L.B.)	119:44:21	Class A1
14		(France) Party	Léon Bollée tricycle	141:10:47	Class C

=== Stage winners ===
The stage-winners were:

Stage	Start-Finish	Distance	Winner	Car	Time	Speed
1	Paris-Auxerre	177.85 km	Lejane	Léon Bollée	5:34:03	31.94 km/h
2	Auxerre-Dijon	150.95 km	Levassor	Panhard et Levassor	6:51:40	22.15 km/h
3	Dijon-Lyon	197.95 km	Levassor	Panhard et Levassor	7:01:08	28.20 km/h
4	Lyon-Avignon	218.90 km	Merkel	Panhard et Levassor	8:19:28	26.30 km/h
5	Avignon-Marseille	100.90 km	Viet	De Dion-Bouton	3:18:18	30.53 km/h
6	Marseille-Avignon	100.90 km	Viet	De Dion-Bouton	3:50:28	26.27 km/h
7	Avignon-Lyon	218.90 km	Merkel	Panhard et Levassor	9:50:50	22.23 km/h
8	Lyon-Dijon	197.95 km	Émile Mayade	Panhard et Levassor	6:35:50	30.01 km/h
9	Dijon-Sens	209.20 km	Émile Mayade	Panhard et Levassor	7:04:00	29.60 km/h
10	Sens-Paris	136.50 km	Émile Mayade	Panhard et Levassor	5:42:15	23.93 km/h

=== Did not finish ===
Entrants who did not finish :

Did Not Finish Driver	No.	Car	stages completed	Notes
Lebrun		Lebrun	5 stages	
P. Dubois		Panhard et Levassor	5 stages	Class A2
Ferradje		Rochet-Schneider	2 stages	
Valentin		Triouleyre	2 stages	
Amédée Bollée		Léon Bollée	1 stage	
Lejane		Léon Bollée	1 stage	Class C
Camille Bollée		Léon Bollée	1 stage	Class C
Chevalier	52	De Dion-Bouton trike	1 stage	Class B
Louis Rigoulot		Peugeot	1 stage	
Rossel		Rossel	1 stage	
Boiron		De Dion-Bouton trike	1 stage	Class B
Tissandier		Tissandier	1 stage	
		Léon Bollée	1 stage	Class C
Ferté		Fisson	0 stages	
Comté Jules-Albert de Dion		De Dion-Bouton	0 stages	
Estève		Triouleyre	0 stages	
Tenting		Tenting	0 stages	
Comté Gaston de Chasseloup-Laubat	14	De Dion-Bouton	0 stages	Class A2
Clere	51	De Dion-Bouton tricycle		unknown
Fernand Charron	13	De Dion-Bouton tricycle		unknown
Chauveau	50	De Dion-Bouton tricycle		unknown
D'Ofraiville	31	Wolfmüller Single seat motorcycle		Failed to qualify - Retired in the Paris-Mantes prologue
Collomb	40	De Dion-Bouton tricycle		Failed to qualify - retired in the Paris-Mantes prologue due to course error. Entered the main event as No. 51 and finished 5th overall.

== See also ==
- Motorsport before 1906
- Paris–Rouen (motor race)
- Paris–Bordeaux–Paris
