= Louis Rigoulot =

French pioneer automotive engineer and racing driver (1844 - 1913)

- Born: Louis Rigoulot; 2 January 1844 Exincourt, Doubs, France
- Died: 29 August 1913 (aged 69) Valentigney, Doubs.

Louis Rigoulot (2 January 1844 – 29 August 1913) was a pioneer motorist and early racing driver.

== Biography ==
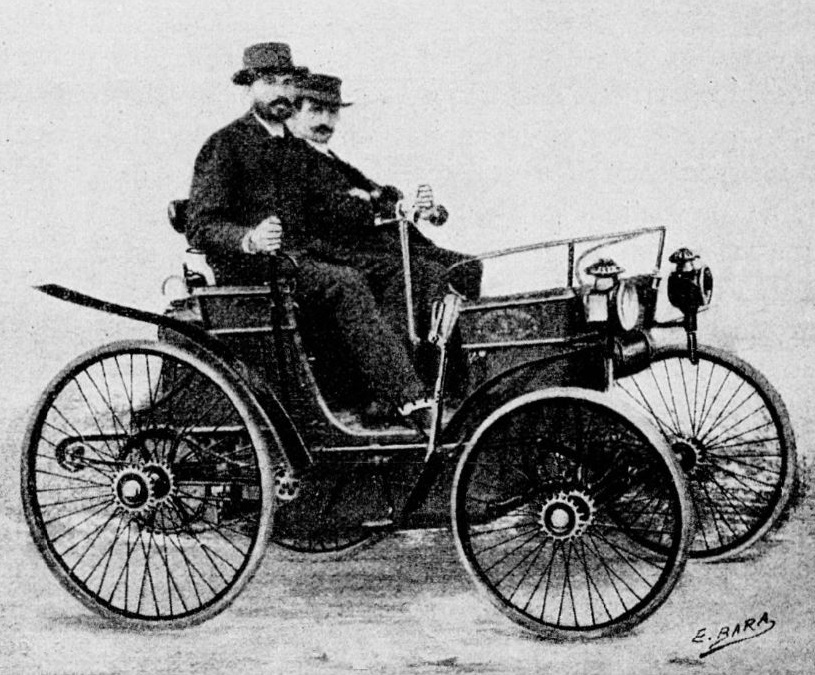
Rigoulot and Doriot at the Paris-Brest-Paris, 1891

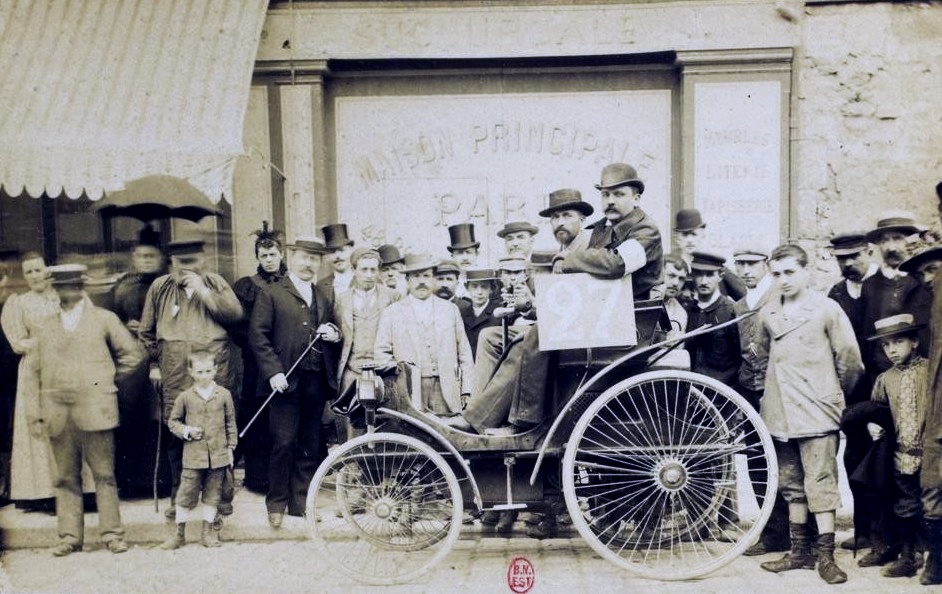
Rigoulot at the Paris-Rouen, 1894.

Graduating from the Arts et Métiers at Châlons in 1860, Louis Rigoulot became a machine engineer in Chemnitz, Germany, before working in a chocolate factory in Paris, and later making cannons at the Compagnie de Fives-Lille for the Franco-Prussian War in 1870; despite being in a reserved occupation, Rigoulot stowed away in a rail carriage to fight on the front line. In 1872, he started working as an engineer at the Peugeot Frères enterprise, in Valentigney, and, while convalescing from an illness, designed the company's first automotive vehicle - a gas-powered tricycle. When Peugeot opened a new factory in Audincourt, he was sent there as director.

Rigoulot created the first Peugeot four-wheeler by fitting a Daimler engine to a quadricycle, and, in 1891, with factory foreman Auguste Doriot, he accomplished the longest drive in an automobile at the time, driving from the Valentigney factory to accompany the Paris-Brest-Paris cycling race.

Rigoulot retired in 1908, and died in 1913 after a long illness. He was survived by his wife and two sons.

== Races ==
Rigoulot took part in the Paris-Rouen reliability trial in 1894 on a 3hp Peugeot, his time not being in the ten fastest, but helping Peugeot to win the team prize. He also took part in the first generally recognized motor race, the Paris–Bordeaux–Paris of 1895, in a two-seater Peugeot; as the first prize was reserved for four-seater cars, Rigoulot was ineligible for overall victory, but set the second-fastest overall time, six hours behind winner Emile Levassor.

Rigoulot's last race was the 1896 Paris–Marseille–Paris, but he retired in the early stages of the race.
