= Cégep de Sainte-Foy =

Public college in Quebec City, Quebec

Coordinates: 46°47′12″N 71°17′13″W

- Established: 1967
- Location: Sainte-Foy–Sillery–Cap-Rouge
- Website: www.csfoy.ca/accueil/

Cégep de Sainte-Foy is a French-language CEGEP in Quebec City, Quebec, Canada. It is located in the borough of Sainte-Foy–Sillery–Cap-Rouge. There are nearly 8,000 students registered at the college, making it one of the largest in the province outside of Montreal. It was founded in 1967.

== History ==
In 1967, cegeps were established in the province of Quebec, following the criticism brought by the Rapport Parent. Indeed, before the law 60 was adopted, the costs to access to higher education were too expensive, the level of education was too poor and the admission to superior school was too strenuous. This legislation led to the construction of twelve cegeps in Quebec, including the Cégep de Sainte-Foy.

The Cégep de Sainte-Foy was founded on July 1, 1967. However, the education system began long before that. Actually, in 1862, the Institute of the Brothers of the Christian Schools created The Quebec Commercial Academy, located on Auteuil's street, which welcomed one hundred and fifty anglophone students. At that time, only boys were allowed to study at that college. In 1865, this institution moved to the intersection of Sainte-Angèle and Elgin's streets.

Having proven themselves as a credible educational facility, they moved once again in 1893 to Cook's street and were in the obligation to expand the establishment to Chauveau's Avenue, due to the excessive number of students attending the school. In reason of its growing clientele, The Quebec Commercial Academy sold its installations, which were located at the center of Vieux-Québec, to the provincial government.

In 1961, the construction of the new school began on Chemin Sainte-Foy. However, it is only in 1962 that the establishment is ready to welcome students. Since 1965, the school opens its doors to girls. It is officially named Cégep de Sainte-Foy in 1967.

== Notable alumni ==
- François Gagnon, ice hockey journalist and television commentator
- Robert Lebel, ice hockey administrator (graduated from the Quebec City Commercial Academy)

== See also ==
- List of colleges in Quebec
- Higher education in Quebec
