= Société Parisienne =

Defunct French cycle manufacturer (1876–1903)

- Société Parisienne logo, 1890s
- Type: Private
- Industry: Bicycle and Automobile manufacturing
- Founded: Paris, 1876
- Founder: M. Reynard; M. Couturier
- Defunct: 1903
- Headquarters: Paris, France

Société Parisienne (Maison Parisienne) was a French manufacturer of velocipedes, bicycles and tricycles from 1876. They began limited automobile construction in 1894 and regular light car (voiturette) construction in 1898 or 1899, and they ceased operation in 1903. The vehicles, variously known as Parisienne, Victoria Combination, Eureka, l'Eclair, Duc-Spider and Duc-Tonneau, were manufactured by Société Parisienne E. Couturier et Cie of Paris.

The first attempt at vehicle manufacture in 1894 was planned to be powered by an 'air compressor' but it did not work.

The first successful motor vehicles were Benzes built under license by M. Laboure of La Maison Parisienne.

In 1898 the company engineer, a M. Serex, designed a flat-twin car which ran in the Marseille-Nice Race of that year; this, too, was built along the lines of a Benz.

The 'Victoria Combination' voiturette achieved front-wheel drive by mounting the engine directly on the front axle and then turning the whole assembly with a tiller, while the driver and passenger were towed in a Victoria trailer (Calèche).

== History ==
'La Société Parisienne de constructions Velo' was founded in 1876 by Victor Reynard, who was awarded the 'Diploma of honour' at the Exposition Universelle (1878). By 1891 it was run by Monsieur Couturier.

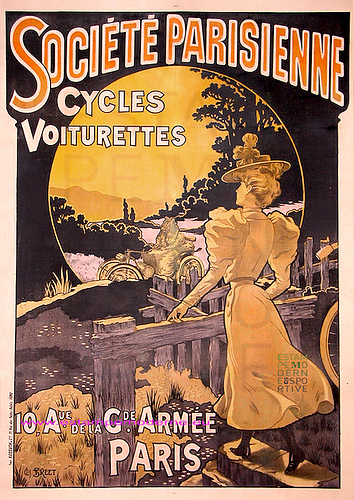
Société Parisienne Poster - Cycles and Voiturettes. circa 1900.

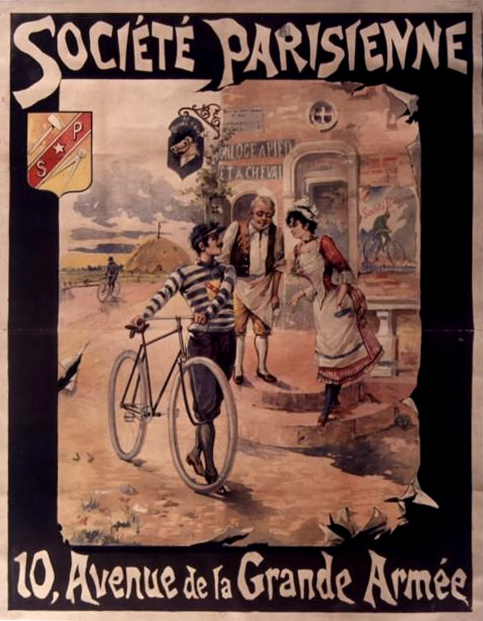
Société Parisienne poster, 10 avenue de la Grande Armée. Circa 1895.

=== Bicycles ===
'La Société Parisienne de constructions Velo' manufactured velocipedes, bicycles and tricycles at its works at 10 avenue de la Grande Armée, Paris, from 1876, and was described in L'Industrie Vélocipédique (Cycling Industry) of 1891 as 'the oldest velocipede manufacturer in France', by which time the workshop was regarded as a model for industrial organisation and practice. The bicycles were described as light, high-quality, 'precision machines', and the range included safety bicycles and a folding Military model.

=== Motoring ===
'La Société Parisienne de constructions Velocipedes et Automobile' built motor vehicles at 10 avenue de la Grande Armée. The earliest record of Parisienne's ambition regarding motorised vehicles is the list of applicants for entry to the world's first motoring competition, the 1894 Paris–Rouen Competition for Horseless Carriages (Concours du 'Petit Journal' Les Voitures sans Chevaux) run by the Paris newspaper Le Petit Journal. The application, listed as number 52, stated that the 'Société Parisienne de constructions Velo' of Paris would use a four-seater vehicle powered by an 'air compressor'—It did not show up at the event. At the 1896 Paris–Marseille–Paris race two Parisiennes (Parisienne-Benz) were entered by Guyonnet and Charles Labouré, and completed the 1,710 km course in 102 hours to record eleventh and twelfth places respectively. The cars were reportedly slightly modified Benz Viktorias, using a single-cylinder, 2.9-litre, 4.5 hp petrol engine.

At the Marseille–Nice–La Turbie event in January 1897 M. Courtois (sic) (possibly M. Couturier) was classified 23rd after completing the 240 kilometres in 12 hours 50 minutes. At the 1897 Paris–Dieppe race three Parisiennes were entered and completed the 178 km distance. The new two-seater vehicle of Serin was classified last in 33rd position in a time of 10 hours 7 minutes 30 seconds. The older four-seater Parisiennes of Guyonnet and Labouré completed the distance but were outside the time limit. At the 170 km Paris–Trouville event in August Monsieur Serin finished 32nd in 8 hours 36 minutes.

At the 1898 Marseille–Nice race Labouré finished 23rd in his Parisienne, covering the 226 km in 11 hours 12 minutes 47 seconds. It was second in the 200–400 kg class.

In 1899 a Parisienne Victoria Combination entered the voiturette class of the 371 km Paris–St Malo race, finishing 23rd overall and second(last) in the class. In October a Victoria Combination won its class in the Paris–Rambouillet–Paris event, covering the 100 kilometre course at 16 mph. In 1900 it completed 150 miles, non-stop, at 18 mph.

=== Motor manufacture ===
The earliest cars built between 1896 and 1898 were reportedly initially based on Benz Viktorias, using a single cylinder, 2.9-litre, 4.5 hp petrol engine. From 1899 over 400 articulated front-wheel drive 'Victoria Combinations' (also known as the Eureka) were manufactured at 10 Avenue de la Grande Armée. From 1900 to 1901 the Duc-Spider and Duc-Tonneau were more conventional models, with the engine mounted in the rigid chassis and driving the rear wheels via a propeller shaft. The 'Duc' (Duke) models used Aster engines of 5,000cc or 6,500cc.

=== Victoria Combination ===
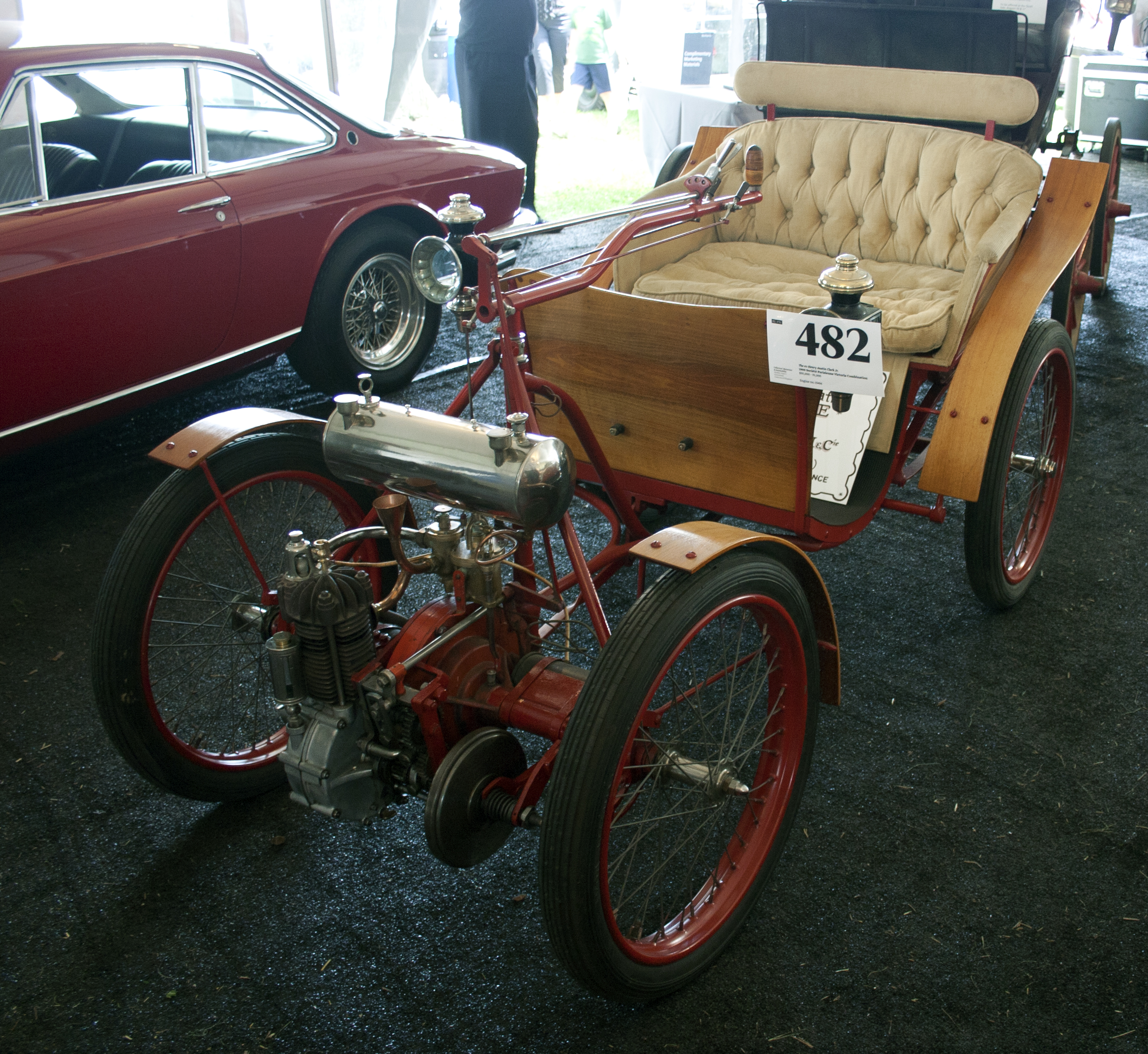
1900 Victoria Combination

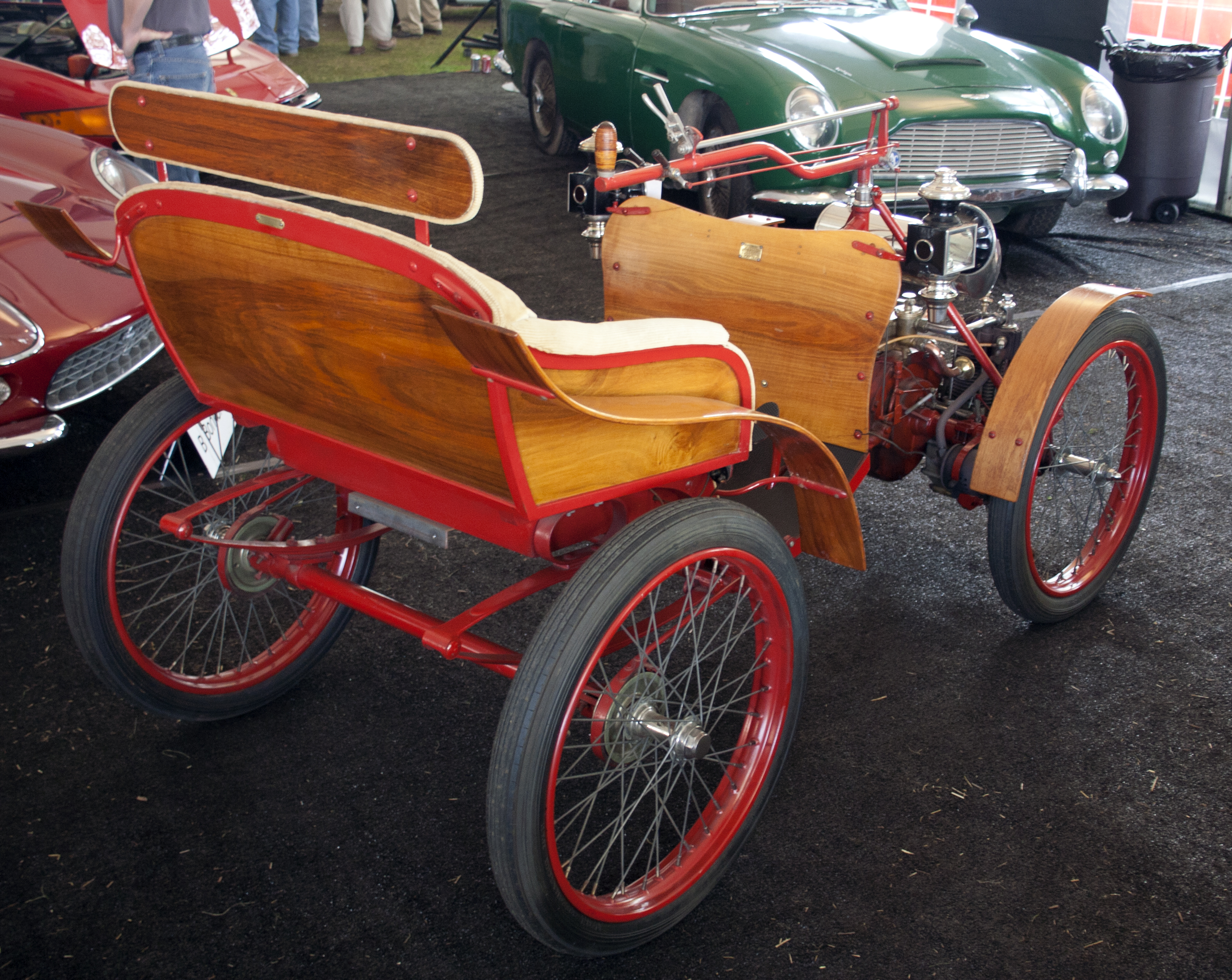
1900 Victoria Combination

The company became known for a front-wheel drive voiturette called the Victoria Combination, which was variously powered by 1.75 hp or 2.5 hp De Dion-Bouton engine or a water-cooled 3.5 hp Aster engine. The engine was mounted on the front axle and so was rotated by the tiller steering. The name Victoria Combination described the lightweight, two-seater trailer commonly known as a Victoria, combined with the rear axle and drive mechanism from a motor tricycle that was placed in front to achieve front-wheel drive. It was also known as the Eureka and Société Parisienne patented the design of articulated front-drive unit and trailer.

The specification of the Victoria developed over time, but the simple design belied the high quality of workmanship. The coachwork was built by a leading Parisian coach-builder Alfred Belvallette, the front axle units were built by Darracq. In June 1899 it was offered with a 2.5 hp De Dion Bouton engine fitted with 'Longuemare automatic carburettor, and a four-speed gearbox made by Guyenet et Balvay to the patent design of J Didier.

When production ceased in mid-1901, over 400 copies had been sold for 3,000 Francs (circa $600) each.

=== Examples ===
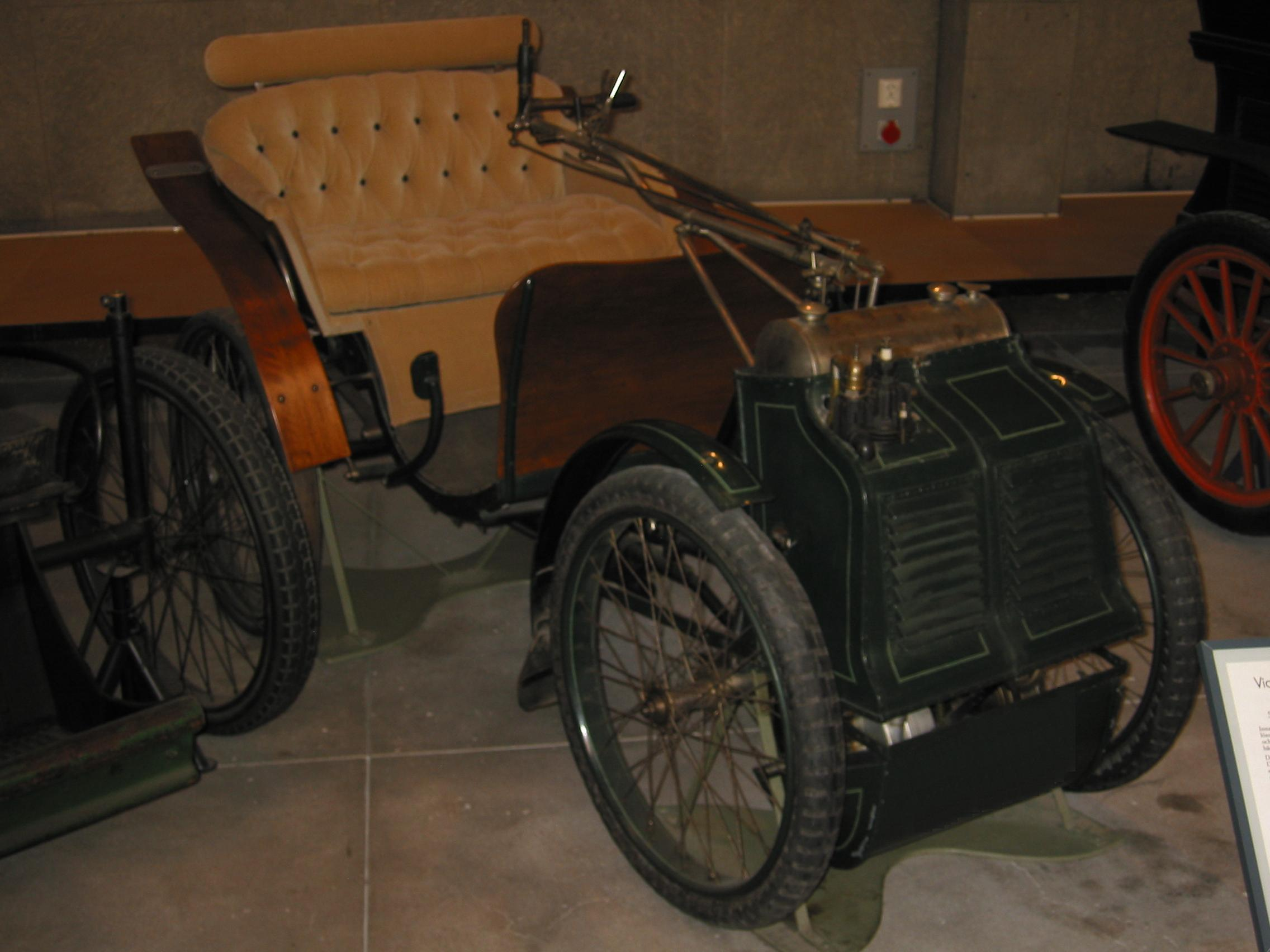
Parisienne - 1899

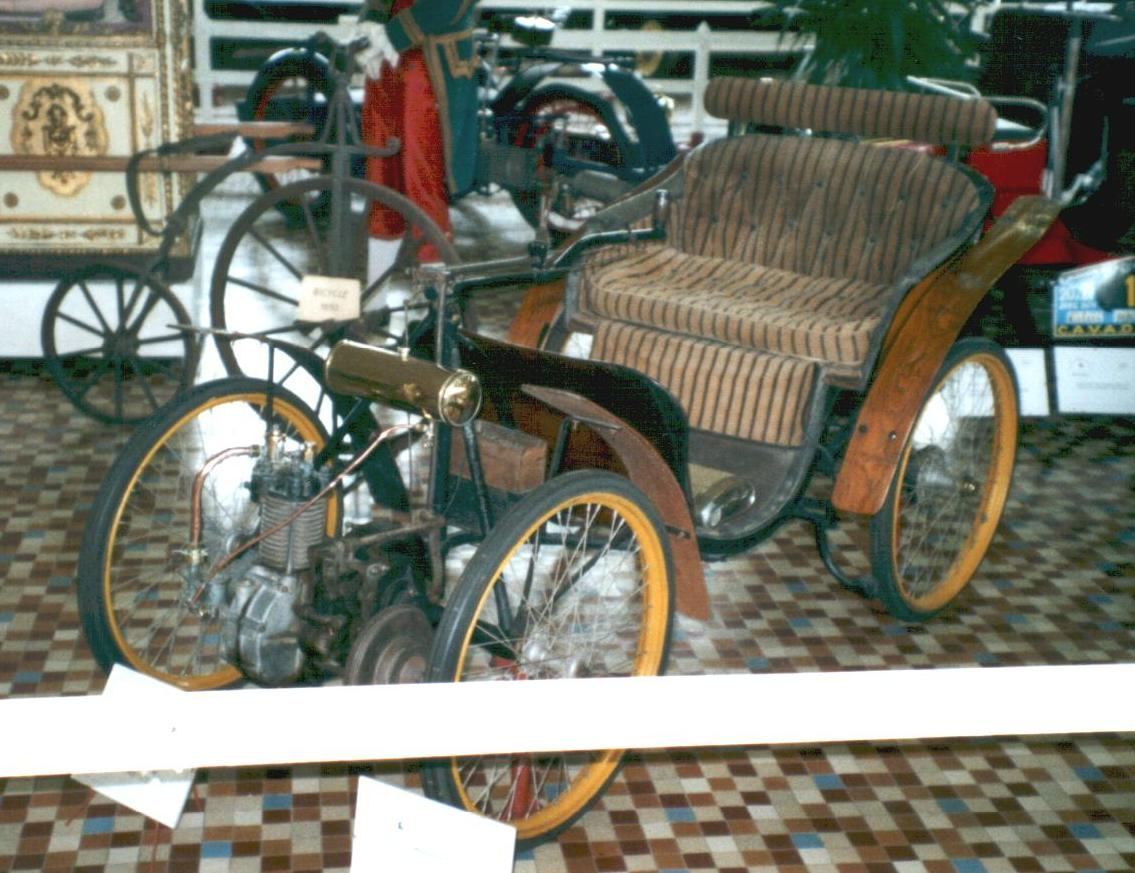
Parisienne - 1898

Examples of the 'Victoria Combination' are currently displayed at the 'Tampa Bay Automobile Museum in Florida' 'Musée Automobile de Vendée'fr:Musée automobile de Vendée in Talmont-Saint-Hilaire, France, and the Swedish National Museum of Science and Technology in Stockholm.

== External links and sources ==
| Transcribed from Tonton Velo, pour les Velos Anciens. Société Parisienne - Vélocipéde manufacturer | Gallica - Bibliothèque nationale de France. L'Industrie vélocipédique, (The Cycle Industry), January 1891, p. 7. Société Parisienne de Construction Vélocipédique |
|---|---|
| The oldest velocipede manufacturer in France was founded in 1876 by Mr. Reynard, who was awarded the 'Diploma of honour' at the 1878 'Exposition Universelle'. The factory, which has gained considerable importance and whose products are highly appreciated by connoisseurs, is located at 10, avenue de la Grande Armée, near the Arc de Triomphe. The Director Mr. Couturier, the director, invited us to visit the large workshops where we never imagined they could cram so many machines. It was no surprise to learn that the workshops had been designed by a specialist engineer who wanted a model factory, that is to say integrated manufacturing of bicycles. It's really wonderful to follow the work of these multiple machine tools, they seem intelligent, pre-programmed, and finish parts with a mathematical precision, ready for use. Thus we realised that the bicycles of Société Parisienne are veritable precision machines. | Le plus ancienne manufacture de France pour le velocipède fut fondée en 1876 par M. Reynard qui obtint le diplome de honneur a l'Exposition Universelle de 1878: cette usine, qui a pris une importance considérable et dont la fabrication est tres appréciée des connaiseurs, est située: 10, avenue de la Grande Armée, pres l'arc de Triomphe de l'Etoile. Il nous a été donné, grâce à son sympathetique directeur M. Couturier, de visiter ses vastes ateliers, où nous n'imaginions pas qu'on pùt entasser un outillage aussi complet. Du reste nous n'avons plus été surpris quand nous avons su que ces ateliers avaient été agencés par ingenieur spécialiste d'une haute capacité, qui a voulu faire une usine modelle, c'est-a-dire crée toute d'une pièce pour la fabrication si intéressante à suivre, des vélocipèdes. C'est vraiment merveilleux de suivre le travail de ces multiples machines-outils qui semblent donées d'intelligence, et de voir sortir d'un morceau informe une pièce finie, avec une précision mathémathique et prête à être mise en place. Aussi nous avons pu nous rendrecompte que les vélocipèdes de la Societe Parisienne sont de veritables pièces de precision. |
