= Doriot =

Doriot is a French surname, and may refer to:

- Auguste Doriot racing motorist, finished third in the world's first motor race Paris–Rouen 1894
- Doriot Anthony Dwyer (1922–2020), American flautist.
- Georges Doriot (1899–1987), one of the first American venture capitalists.
- Jacques Doriot (1898–1945), a French communist, later fascist
- Roger Ernest Doriot (1943- ), Civil Engineer, then evangelical Protestant missionary to Irian Jaya/Papua, Indonesia (west New Guinea), from 1975- .
