= Léon Bollée =

Inventor and Automobile Manufacturer

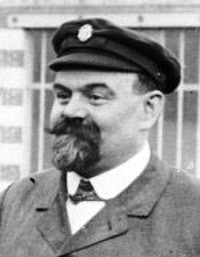
- Born: 1 April 1870; Le Mans, France
- Died: 16 December 1913 (aged 43); Neuilly-sur-Seine
- Occupations: Automobile manufacturer and inventor

Léon Bollée (French pronunciation: [leɔ̃ bɔle]; 1 April 1870 – 16 December 1913) was a French automobile manufacturer and inventor.

== Life ==
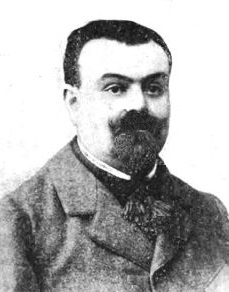

Bollée's family were well known bellfounders and his father, Amédée Bollée (1844–1917), was the major pioneer in the automobile industry who produced several steam cars. Both Léon Bollée and his older brother Amédée-Ernest-Marie (1867–1926) became automobile manufacturers. The third brother was Camille.

== Early invention ==
In 1885, at the age of 14, an early inventor, Léon Bollée made himself known by the construction of a kind of pedalo.

== Calculating machines ==
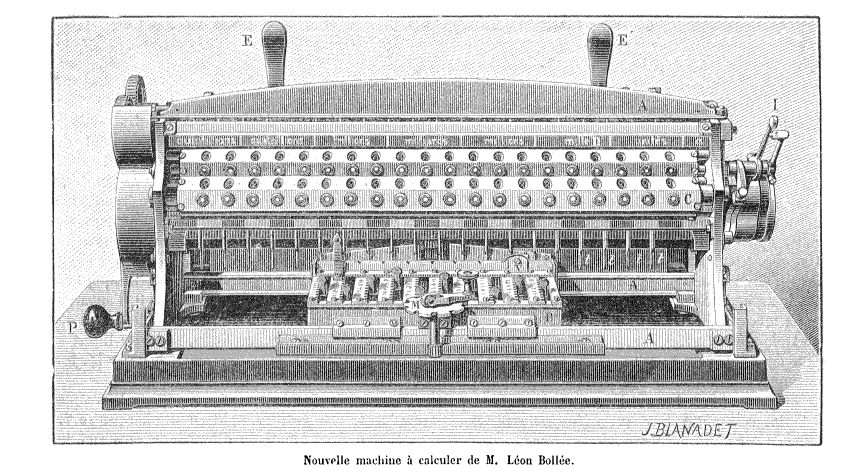
Léon Bollée's Multiplier

In 1887, in order to help his father, a car manufacturer and inventor, and to avoid errors in many calculations required for their manufacture, Bollée began work on three calculating machines: the Direct Multiplier, the Calculating Board and the Arithmographe. Bollée's Multiplier was the second successful direct-multiplying calculator (the first was Ramón Verea's) and it won a gold medal at the 1889 Paris Exposition. Three versions of the large multiplier and several smaller machines were developed by Bollée and the devices were patented in France, Belgium, Germany, the USA and Hungary.

== Transport ==
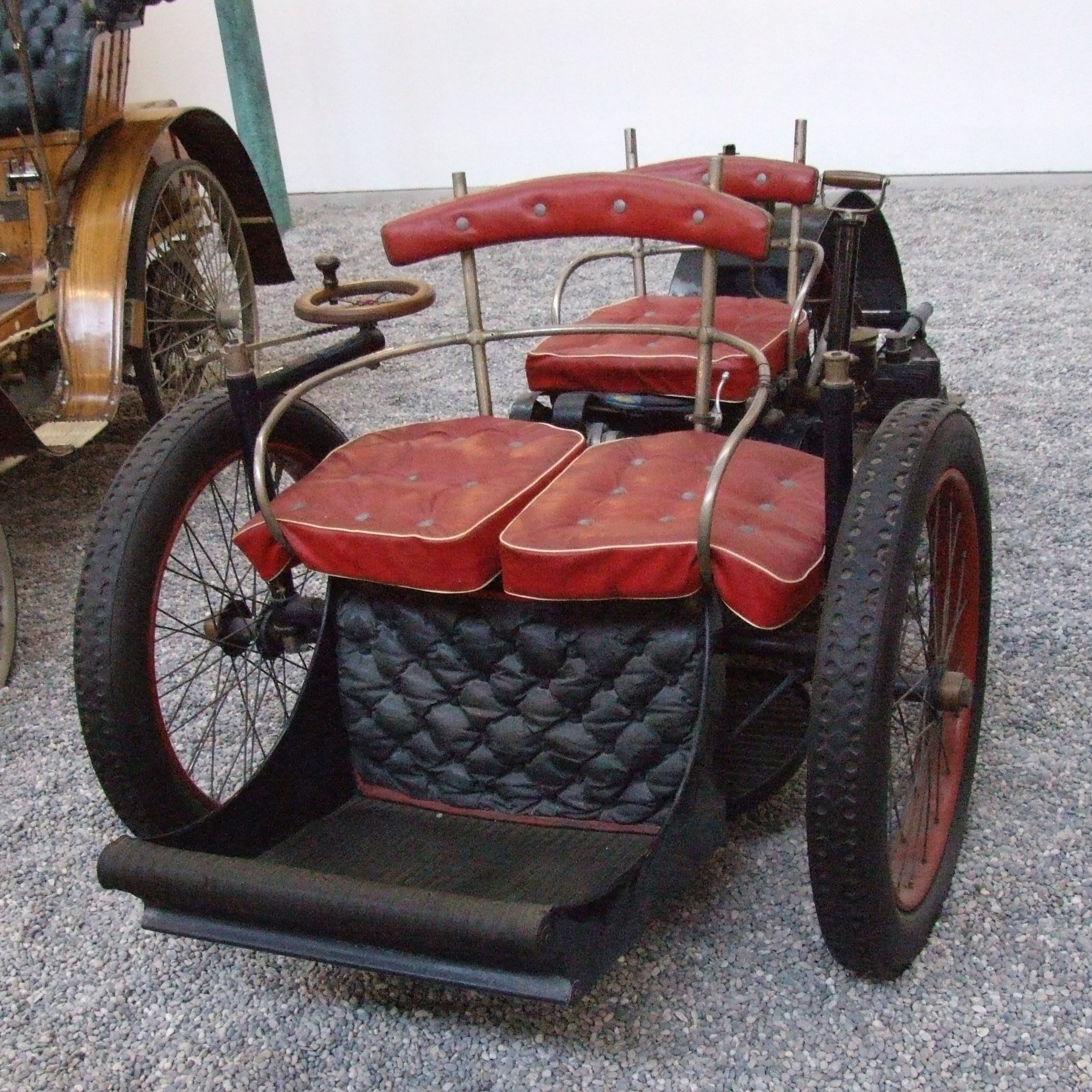
Léon Bollées Tricar, Schlumpf Collection, Mulhouse, France

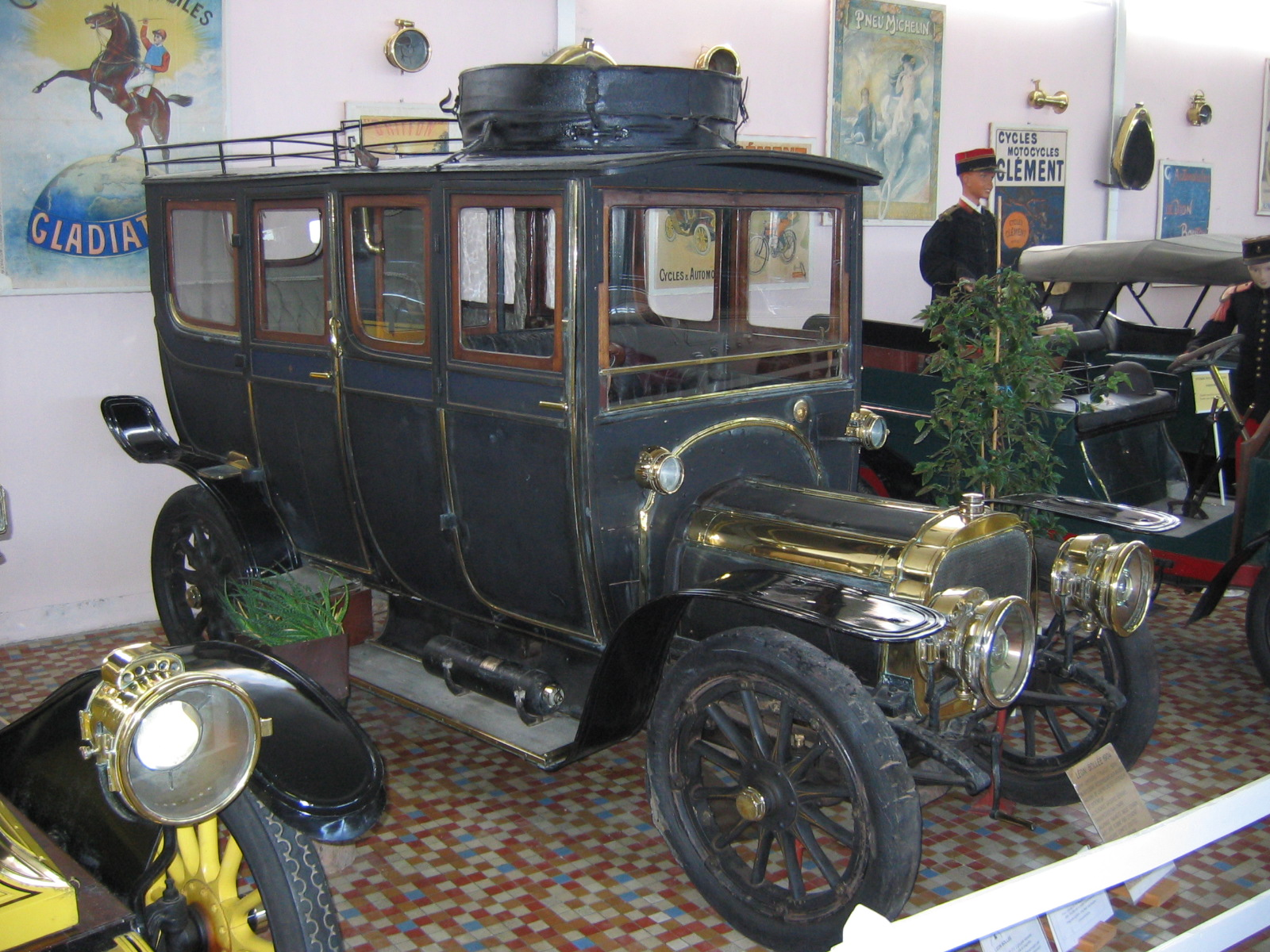
Car of 1904, 7 Seats

=== Steam locomotive ===
In 1892, his father, Amédée Bollée and him produced a steam locomotive for the Chemin de fer du Finistère.

=== Automobiles ===
Bollée and his father entered a steam car, La Nouvelle, in the 1895 Paris–Bordeaux–Paris race and Bollée went on to develop a gasoline-powered vehicle in 1895 which was entered in the 1896 Paris–Marseille–Paris.

=== Car manufacturing ===
Bollée founded the company Léon Bollée Automobiles in 1895 in Le Mans. In 1896 he patented and began manufacturing the three-wheeled vehicles he had invented in 1895 which he called the Voiturette.

The position of the passenger, at the front, earned the Voiturette the nickname "Mother-in-law killer" ("Tue Belle-mère", in French). These had a horizontal motor and were equipped with rubber tires. A new model with many modifications was brought to the 1897 Paris-Dieppe race, driven by Paul Jamin, and the Paris-Trouville race and won both events with respective speeds of 24 mph (39 km/h) and 28 mph (45 km/h).

In April 1898, in France, Bollée won the "Critérium des Motocycle".

In 1903, Bollée produced his first big car. The company built two 4-cylinder models, one 28hp 4.6-liter, and one 45hp 8-litre engine. Both won the "Blackport Southport Speed Trials", in September 1904, in front of Dorothy Levitt's Gladiator.

In 1908, when Wilbur Wright visited France to demonstrate the Wright Brothers aircraft, Bollée let Wilbur use his Le Mans automobile factory. Bollée's wife Carlotta (née Messinisi) (c.1880-?) was fluent in Greek, French and English and acted as interpreter as neither man spoke the other's language. She translated the technical discussions over a period of several weeks, whilst heavily pregnant. In recognition of this, Wright promised that his first French flight would be on the day her baby was expected, 8 August 1908. Baby Elisabeth actually arrived on 9 August, Wilbur Wright became her godfather. Carlotta Bollée flew for the first time on 8 October 1908, alongside Wright. Her flight was at an altitude of about 25 metres and lasted around four minutes.

Bollée was injured in a flying accident in 1911 and never really recovered as he also had a pre-existing heart problem. He died in 1913. In 1920, his widow Carlotta Bollée travelled to visit the Wright family in America after the death of Wilbur and gave them an album and memorabilia of Wilbur’s time with her family. In 1927 she donated an engine to the Museum of Le Mans, which had been reassembled by Wilbur Wright and her husband from the two originally sent out from the USA. Madame Bollée continued to run the company successfully but in 1924 it was bought by Morris Motors and the company was renamed Morris-Léon Bollée, the intention being to use the new company to sell Morris designs in France and circumvent the then current French import restrictions. Morris sold the company in 1931 to a group of investors who renamed it Societé Nouvelle Léon Bollée and production continued until 1933.

== Family ==
The Bollée's daughter Élisabeth, a poet, married the Count Jean Maurice Gilbert de Vautibault in 1927, and later divorced de Vautibault to marry the artist Julien Binford. She published under the name Élisabeth de Vautibault, and died 11 July 1984.
