= Peugeot Type 3 =

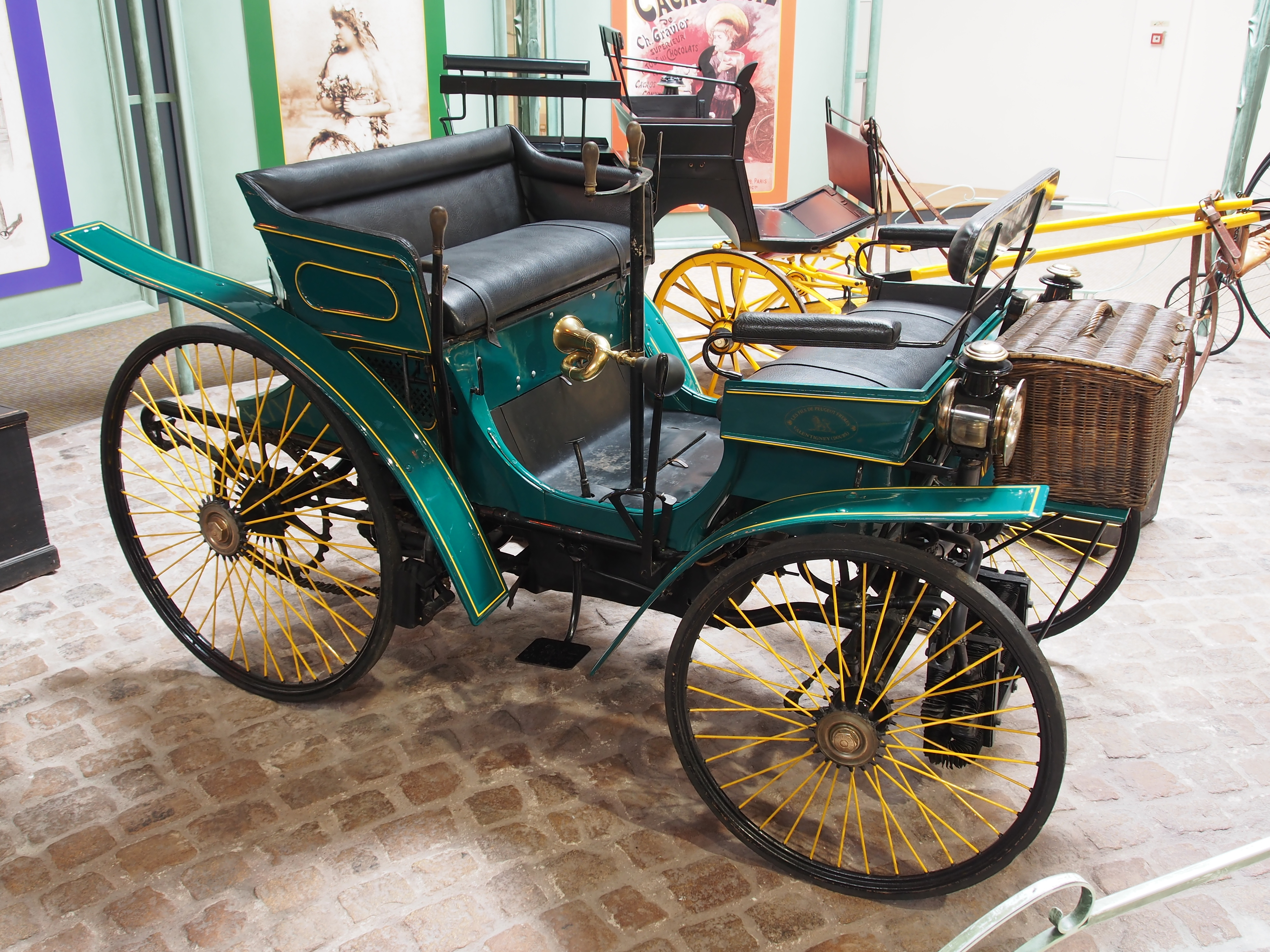

Overview
- Manufacturer: S. A. des Automobiles Peugeot
- Production: 1891–1894; 64 produced

Body and chassis
- Body style: Vis-à-vis
- Layout: RR layout

Powertrain
- Engine: 565 cc V-twin; 2 hp @ 1000 rpm

Dimensions
- Wheelbase: 1.63 metres (64 in)

Chronology
- Predecessor: Peugeot Type 2
- Successor: Peugeot Type 4

The Peugeot Type 3 was an early French automobile; it was Peugeot's first model to be produced in significant numbers. It was their second car with an internal combustion engine.

== Background ==
The earliest Peugeot models from 1889 were steam-powered tricycles, built in collaboration with Léon Serpollet. In 1890, Armand Peugeot met with car technology innovators Gottlieb Daimler and Émile Levassor and became convinced that reliable, practical, lightweight vehicles would have to be powered by petrol and have four wheels. The Type 2 was the first such model. Peugeot's one-time partner, Serpollet, continued with steam technology under the brand name Gardner-Serpollet until Serpollet's death in 1907.

== Performance ==
The engine was a German design by Daimler but was licensed for production in France by Panhard et Levassor and then sold to Peugeot. It was a 15° V-twin and produced 2 bhp, sufficient for a top speed of approximately 18 kilometres per hour (11 mph).

== World record ==
Peugeot decided to show the quality of the Type 3 by running a demonstration model alongside the cyclists in the inaugural Paris–Brest–Paris cycle race in September 1891, thus gaining official confirmation of progress from the race marshals and time-keepers. His chief engineer Louis Rigoulot and rising workshop foreman Auguste Doriot proved the robustness of the design, as this demonstration car ran for 2,045 kilometres (1,271 miles), from Peugeot's factory in Valentigney to Paris, over the race course, and then back to Valentigney, at an average speed of 14.7 km/h (9.1 mph), without major malfunctions. This was the longest run to that time by a petrol-powered vehicle and about four times as far as the previous record set by Léon Serpollet from Paris to Lyon. The demonstrator became the first Peugeot sold to the public.

A lightened Type 3 was entered into the Paris–Bordeaux–Paris race in June 1895, finishing second and maintaining an average speed of 21.7 kilometres per hour (13.5 mph).

== Italian production ==
In 1891 Costruzioni Meccaniche di Saronno of Varese, Italy, began assembling Peugeot Type 3 cars under a Peugeot license.
