= Émile Mayade =

French motoring pioneer and racing driver (1853–1898)

Émile Louis Mayade
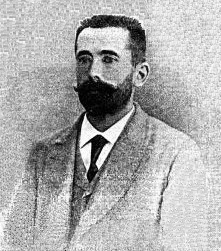
- Émile Mayade
- Born: 21 August 1853; Clermont-Ferrand, France
- Died: 18 September 1898 (aged 45); Chevanceaux, Charente-Maritime, France
- Occupations: Driver and 'Chef d'Atelier' at Panhard et Levassor
- Known for: Motoring, Winner of 1896 Paris–Marseille–Paris
- Spouse: Jeanne Marie Dussutour

Émile Louis Mayade (21 August 1853 – 18 September 1898) (sometimes misspelled Mayard) was a French motoring pioneer and racing driver. He drove a Panhard et Levassor in the world's first 'city to city' motoring contest from Paris to Rouen in 1894 and went on win the world's first open motor race, the 1896 Paris–Marseille–Paris, where the first driver across the line was the winner.

== Biography ==
Émile Mayade was born in Clermont-Ferrand in 1853 and by the 1890s was working as 'Chef d'Atelier' at Levassor in Paris, looking after the workshop and machinery, plus participating in the development of the cars. He was married to Jeanne Marie Louise Dussutour of Tarbes and they lived above the Levassor workshop in the 'Avenue d'Ivry' in the 13th arrondissement of Paris.

== Racing ==
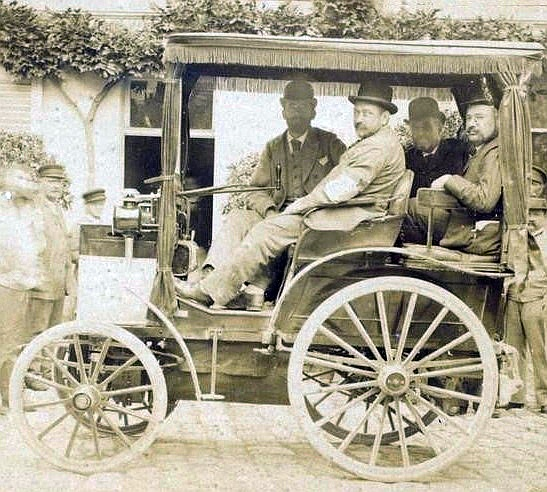
1894 – Panhard et Levassor driven by Émile Mayade in the 1894 Paris-Rouen. Entrant No 64

Mayade drove a Panhard et Levassor Phaeton 8 hp in the world's first motoring event from Paris to Rouen in 1894 where he finished seventh after eight hours and nine minutes.

In 1895 he finished sixth in the Paris–Bordeaux–Paris race after 72 hours 14 minutes.

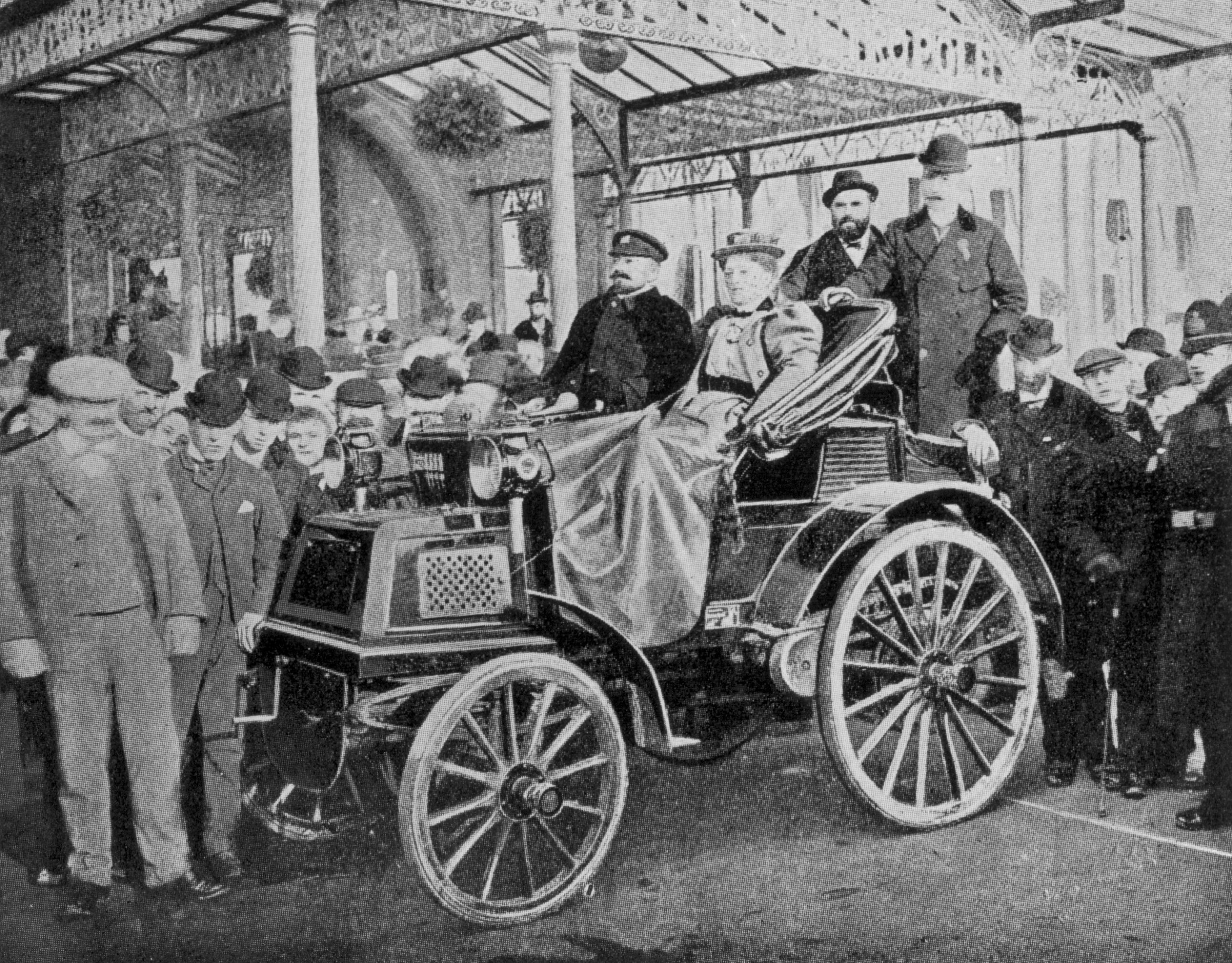
Émile Mayade on the Panhard No. 6 on which he won the 1896 Paris-Marseille race. Photograph taken at the Hotel Metropole, Brighton, 14 November 1896, after taking part in the Emancipation Run

His greatest success was the victory in the 1896 Paris–Marseille–Paris where he won three stages and finished in 67 hours 42 minutes 58 seconds, almost 30 minutes ahead of Merkel in another Panhard et Levassor 8 hp. The Panhard had been extensively upgraded for 1896, using their first four-cylinder engine which provided twice the horsepower of the 1895 model. It was equipped with tiller steering and candle lamps. The brakes were spoon-levers pressing on each solid rubber back tyre and a band brake on the counter-shaft in the transmission. This was the same vehicle in which Émile Levassor had won 2 of the first three stages before suffering an injury during stage 4 from which he died a year later.

On 14 November 1896 he finished 6th (or poss. 4th) in the inaugural London to Brighton Veteran Car Run (Emancipation Day Run) to celebrate the Emancipation of British motorists and the repeal of the Red Flag Act. He took 6 hours 8 minutes 15 seconds to complete the 54 miles (87 km) in a Panhard & Levassor 8 hp, Phaeton 4 seater. The car was subsequently sold to Charles Rolls for £1,200.

In July 1897 Mayade drove a Panhard in the Paris-Dieppe race which was won by Count Jules-Albert de Dion in a de Dion 20 hp steamer.

== Death ==
Mayade died in 1898 in Chevanceaux, Charente-Maritime, after a traffic accident with a runaway horse and cart that caused him to be thrown from his car and crushed.
