= Auguste Doriot =

French motoring pioneer (1863–1955)

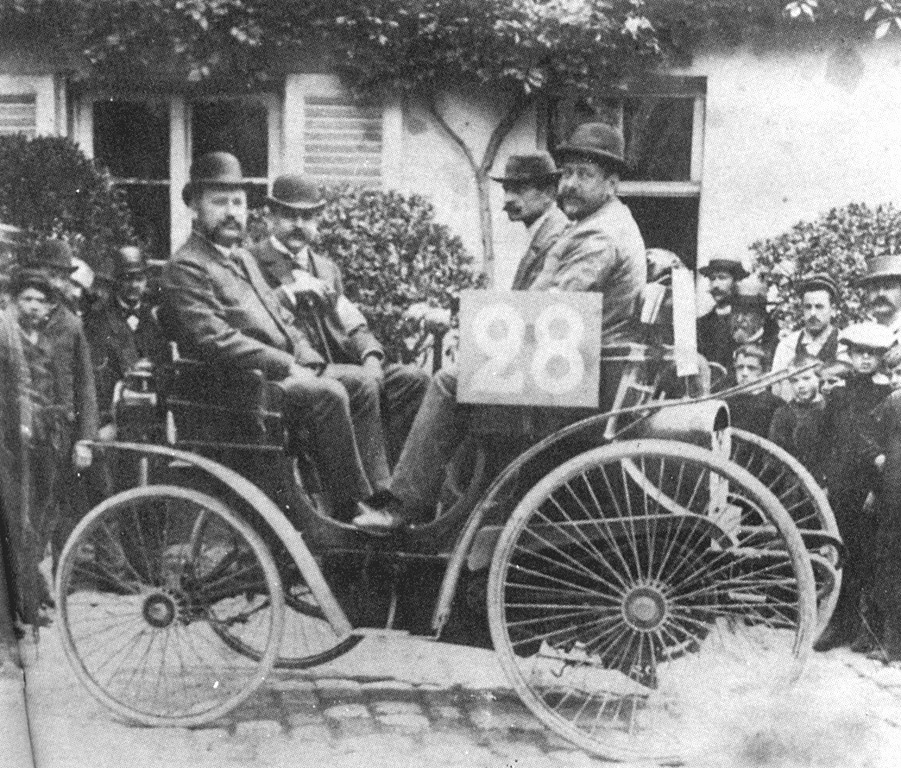
- Auguste Doriot (second from right) driving a Vis a vis (Face to face) Peugeot 3hp during the 1894 Paris-Rouen Contest
- Born: Auguste Frederic Doriot; 24 October 1863; Sainte-Suzanne, Doubs in Franche-Comté
- Died: 1955; Menton, France

Auguste Frédéric Doriot (24 October 1863 – 1955) was a French motoring pioneer who developed, built and raced cars for Peugeot before founding his own manufacturing company D.F.P. in combination with Ludovic Flandrin and the Parant brothers. In 1891, Doriot and his Peugeot colleague Louis Rigoulot completed the longest trip by a petrol powered vehicle when their self-designed and built Daimler powered Peugeot Type 3 completed 2,100 kilometres (1375 miles) from Valentigney to Paris and Brest and back again. They were attached to the first Paris-Brest-Paris bicycle race, but the duo reached Brest one day after the winning cyclist, Charles Terront, finished in Paris, and they then finished six days after him.

Doriot's son, Georges Doriot, emigrated to the United States and became a professor at the Harvard Business School, where he later became known as the father of Venture Capitalism. He also served as a brigadier general during World War II and was known for founding INSEAD business school.

== Early life ==
Auguste Frederic Doriot was born on 24 October 1863, the second youngest of eight children, in the village of Sainte-Suzanne, Doubs in Franche-Comté. On 27 September 1894 at Valentigney he married 24-year-old Berthe Camille Baehler from Voujeaucourt, known as Camille, who had a Swiss father from Uetendorf and a French mother. She had been orphaned aged three and was raised by her grandmother and three older sisters. The couple went on to have two children, Georges Frederic was born in September 1899 and Madeleine Georgette (Zette) was born on 11 August 1906 at the family home in Neuilly-sur-Seine.

Doriot was a cold, stern, driving, ambitious father, unlike Camille. Even Georges' successes were met without enthusiasm, and 'his cool stare was worse than any physical punishment'. Georges was trained in the D.F.P workshops and was able to enlist as an Artillery engineer after WW1. After the war the family sent him to the Massachusetts Institute of Technology (MIT) in the USA but he switched to the Harvard Business School where he became a Professor and the father of Venture Capitalism. He also became Brigadier general (United States) during WWII. Georges also noted: "I think that my father worked 24 hours a day."

== Career ==
=== Peugeot ===
In 1889 at the age of 26, Doriot finished his military service and took a job at the Peugeot bicycle factory in Beaulieu-sur-Doubs, Valentigney (or possibly 1887). Armand Peugeot, seeing his technical potential and ambition, sent him on a series of apprenticeships to develop his skills. By 1891 he had become a full employee at the factory and began working for the company's main engineer, Louis Rigoulot, installing Daimler engines into Peugeot's first vehicles, thus developing a four-wheeled petroleum-powered Quadricycle - the Peugeot Type 2 and the Type 3 with 2.5 hp, four forward gears plus reverse. This enterprise saw Doriot promoted to foreman.

==== World's longest drive Paris–Brest–Paris ====
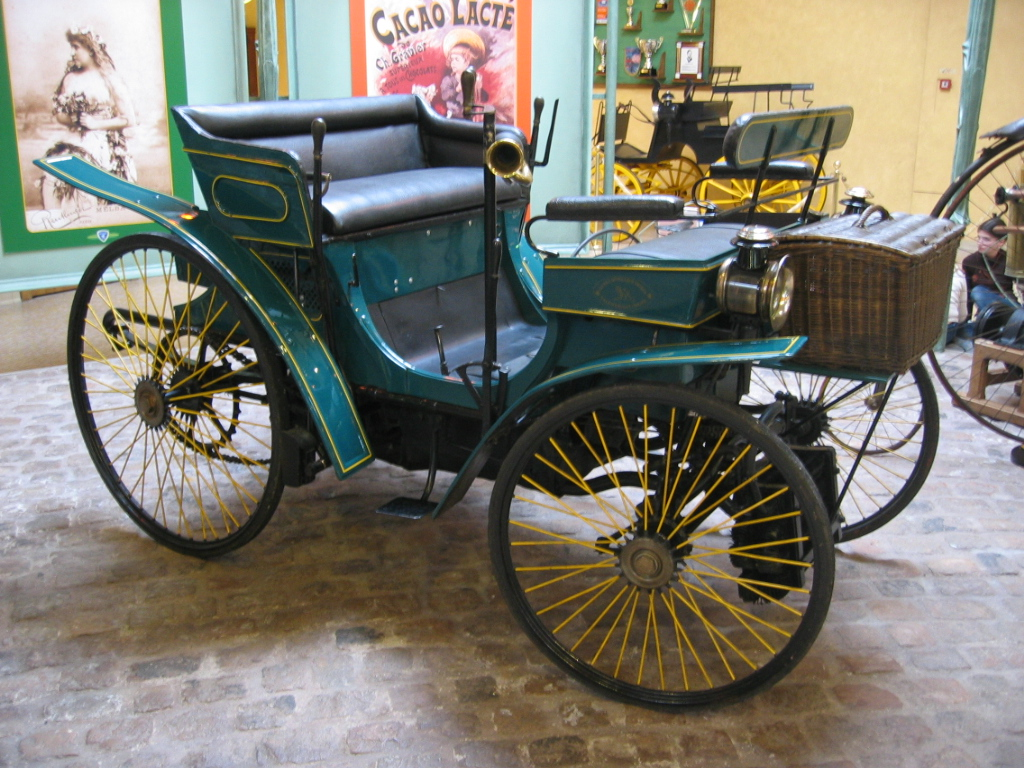
Peugeot Type 3. Model that Doriot and Rigoulot drove in the 1891 Paris–Brest–Paris bicycle race.

In order to publicly prove the reliability and performance of the 'Quadricycle' it was officially entered (appended) into the 1891 Paris–Brest–Paris bicycle race, Armand Peugeot having persuaded the organiser, Pierre Giffard of Le Petit Journal, of the benefits if his network of monitors and marshalls could vouchsafe the performance. The intended distance of 1200 kilometres had never been achieved by a motorised vehicle, it being about three times further than the record set by Leon Serpollet from Paris to Lyon. Additionally Rigoulot and Doriot loaded the Type 3 Quadricycle with tools, spare parts, luggage and water, and drove it 300 kilometres from Valentigny to Paris, a three-day journey. They reached 20 kilometres an hour on flat roads but Rigoulot had to walk behind up the hills, ready to push. Peugeot had to pre-seed the route with petrol supplies, so employees placed cans at strategic railway stations about 60 kilometres apart. Unfortunately some were lost or disposed of by station masters on safety grounds so the 'racers' had to acquire dry cleaning fluid.

The Peugeot left Paris behind the cyclists on 8 September, covering 200 kilometres on the first day and 160 kilometres on the second, but then lost 24 hours when a gear failed near Morlaix. After effecting a repair using local resources (a shoemaker's tools) they arrived at Brest after dark where they were received by a large crowd and the local Peugeot bicycle dealer. Le Petit Journal reported their arrival in Brest on 12 September, one day after it reported winning cyclist Charles Terront's finishing the race back in Paris. Doriot and Rigoulot arrived in Paris with cyclists 88–96 on 16 September to complete the Paris–Brest–Paris race six days after the winner. (Note: Le Petit Journal Paris, 12 September 1891 states: Le Petit Journal Paris, 12 September 1891. The National Race, Paris to Brest and return. Brest 11 September / Le Petit Journal Paris, 12 September 1891. La Course National de Paris a Brest et Retour. Brest 11 Septembre; The gasoline[petrol] powered Peugeot Quadricycle which arrived the day before yesterday after 39 hours [since leaving Paris], leaves for the capital tomorrow. / Le Quadricycle à gazoline Peugeot, arrivé avant-hier de Paris en 39 hours, repart demain pour la capitale.) (Note: Le Petit Journal Paris, 11 September 1891 states: Le Petit Journal Paris, 11 September 1891. Arrival in Paris / Le Petit Journal Paris, 11 September 1891. ARRIVÉS Á PARIS; 9 September: 1st Mr Charles Terront, Bayonne, arrived at 6:37 in the morning, from Paris to Brest and back in 71 hours 37 minutes. / Journee du 9 Septembre: 1er MM Ch. Terront de Bayonne arrivé à 6 heures 37 minutes du matin, traject de Paris à Brest, et retour en 71 heures 37 minutes.) (Note: Le Petit Journal Paris, 16 September 1891 states: Le Petit Journal Paris, 16 September 1891. The National Race, Paris to Brest and return / Le Petit Journal Paris, 16 September 1891. La Course National de Paris a Brest et Retour; The gasoline powered Quadricyle continued its superb journey. It arrived on Sunday evening at Vitré, Ille-et-Vilaine and left the next morning to Mortagne where it spent yesterday morning. It arrived [in Paris] yesterday evening at seven o'clock at the Porte Maillot. [15 September 1891] / Le Quadricyle à gazoline Peugeot à poursuive brillament son voyage. Il est arrivé Dimanche soir à Vitré, et est parti le lendemain matin pour Mortagne ou il à passé hier matin. Il est arrivé hier soir à sept heures à la Porte Maillot.)

==== Engineering development, testing and racing ====
Throughout the 1890s Doriot worked for Peugeot at Doubs, and was regarded as Armand Peugeot's protégé, developing and testing the cars, plus competing in the Grandes Épreuves. Armand Peugeot appointed Doriot as director of Peugeot's Paris factory and new showroom on the Avenue de la Grande Armée.

Doriot drove for Peugeot in the Grandes Épreuves of the 1890s, consistently finishing near the top after many hours of competing on unsurfaced roads in difficult conditions. On 22 July 1894, he finished third in the Paris-Rouen Trail, covering the 126 kilometres in seven hours. In 1895 he finished fourth in the Paris–Bordeaux–Paris Trail, carrying three passengers for the 59-hour race. In 1896 he finished eighth in the ten-day Paris-Marseilles-Paris Trail, covering the 1,710 kilometres in 81 hours. In 1897 he finished 29th in the Paris-Dieppe Trail, taking six hours for the 170 kilometres. He finished seventh in the 1898 Paris–Amsterdam–Paris after taking 36 hours to cover the 1,431 kilometres. In 1899 he was second in the Paris-Saint Malo trail and 10th in the Paris-Ostende trail driving Peugeot voiturettes. In 1900 he finished fourth in the Coupe des Voiturettes averaging circa 36 kilometres per hour.

=== D.F.P. (Doriot, Flandrin et Parant) ===
Doriot left Peugeot in 1902, and worked for Clément-Bayard for a short time while preparing to establish his own company.

In 1906 Doriot cofounded Doriot Flandrin (DF et Cie) with Ludovic Flandrin, also from Clément-Bayard, at 169 Boulevard St Denis in Courbevoie, near Paris, where they manufactured a small car with single cylinder 1.1 litre engine. It was sold as a Doriot Flandrin. In 1908 the brothers Alexandre and Jules René Parant joined and the company became D.F.P. Doriot, Flandrin & Parant, adding a new range using 4-cylinder Chapuis-Dornier engines for 2 litre (10 hp), 2.4 litre (12 hp) and 2.8 litres (14 hp).

D.F.P. started to make their own high quality engines in 1912, a high performance version of which was used by W. O. Bentley at Brooklands.

After World War I they used proprietary engines but by 1922 they started to make their own engines again, which they supplied to the recently reborn British manufacturer GN until 1923. Production finished in 1926 and the factory was sold, by which time Doriot was 62 years old.

Doriot died in Menton, France in 1955.

== Race results ==
Year	Event	Date	Location	Distance	Result	# No.	Manufacturer	Time	Notes
1894	Paris-Rouen Trail	22 July 1894	Paris-Rouen	127 km	3		Peugeot	7h04m30	
1895	Paris–Bordeaux–Paris Trail	25 February 1895	Paris-Bordeaux-Paris	1178 km	4		Peugeot	59h49m00	; carried 3 passengers
1896	Paris-Marseilles-Paris Trail	24 September - 3 October 1896	Paris-Marseilles-Paris	1710 km	8	44	Peugeot	81h23m51	
1897	Paris-Dieppe Trail	24 July 1897	Paris-Dieppe	170.8 km	29		Peugeot (6)	6h26m53	
1898	Paris-Amsterdam-Paris Trail	7–13 July 1898	Paris-Amsterdam-Paris	1431 km	7		Peugeot	36h20m47	
1899	Paris-Saint Malo	30 July 1899	Paris-Saint Malo	371.75 km	2 or 13		Peugeot Voiturette	12h17m00	
1899	Paris-Ostende	1 September 1899	Paris-Ostende	323.5 km	10		Peugeot Voiturette	10h53m	
1900	Coupe des Voiturettes	11 March 1900		220 km	4	24	Peugeot	5h58m51	; heavy water
