= Triouleyre =

French automobile

The Triouleyre was a French automobile manufactured from 1896 to 1898. The car had a rear-mounted five-horsepower horizontal engine along the lines of a Benz driving the back axle through belts and chains. Two started in the 1896 Paris–Marseille–Paris and Paris-Nantes races but failed to finish.
