= Émile Delahaye =

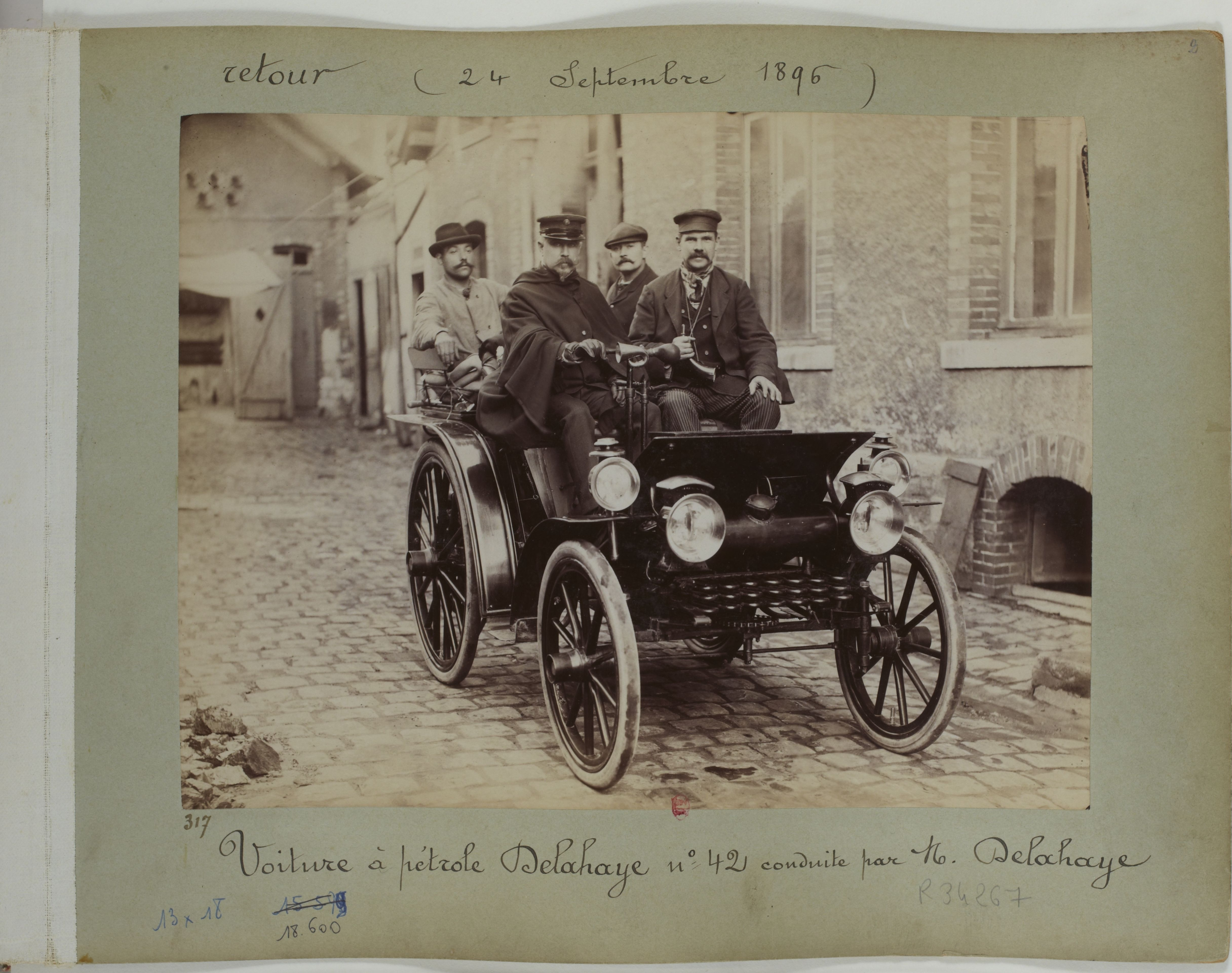
- Born: Émile Delahaye; 16 October 1843
- Died: 1 June 1905 (aged 61)

Émile Delahaye (16 October 1843 – 1 June 1905) was a French automotive pioneer who founded Delahaye Automobiles.

Émile Delahaye was born in Tours, Indre-et-Loire. He studied engineering at Arts et Métiers Paris Technical trade school in Angers, the same educational institution later attended by Louis Delâge, another French automobile pioneer.

For a time, Delahaye worked in Belgium, at the Crail Engineering works, a company known for making steam locomotives. He returned to Tours following the French defeat in the Franco-Prussian War of 1870-1871, where he went to work for Monsieur Berthon, the proprietor of the Berthon Foundry And Machineworks, as his administrative assistant and senior engineer.

Delahaye married in 1873 but the couple were not young enough to conceive any children. In 1879 Delahaye assumed control of the Brethon Foundry and Machine-works, a business manufacturing brick kilns and related equipment for the ceramics trade. Delahaye experimented with steam and internal combustion engines, eventually converting part of the company's production to manufacturing stationary petrol engines for pumps.

In 1894, he displayed his first automobile at the inaugural Paris Motor Show, held in a large Paris art gallery. Aside from the myriad motorized bicycles and tricycles, Delahaye's was one of only two automobiles entered.

To publicize his product, Delahaye raced one of his cars in the 1896 Paris–Marseille–Paris road race. Faced with health problems, and realizing the need for additional invested capital, better machine tools, and larger assembly space, Delahaye partnered with two Paris industrialists, brothers-in-law Leon Desmarais and Georges Morane. By 1898 the newly incorporated owners relocated their automobile production from Tours to the industrial building in the Gobelin district of Paris that Desmarais and Morane inherited. By 1901 Delahaye's rapidly deteriorating health forced him to step down as President. He sold his shares to his partners, and retired to the French Riviera where he died in 1905.

The company Delahaye founded survived until 31 December 1954.
