= L'Éclair (automobile) =

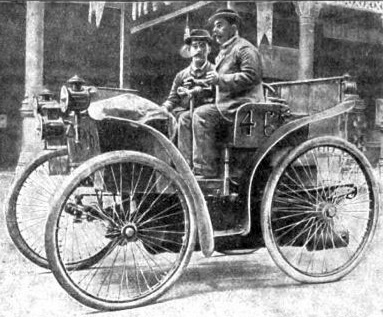

Overview
- Manufacturer: Michelin
- Production: 1895
- Assembly: Clermont-Ferrand, France
- Designer: Peugeot

Body and chassis
- Class: Sports car
- Body style: 2-door

Powertrain
- Engine: 4 HP from boat
- Transmission: Zigzag

Dimensions
- Curb weight: 3,086 lb (1,400 kg)

L'Éclair was the first car in the world to participate in a motor race with pneumatic tyres. It was built by the brothers Michelin in 1895. It participated in the Paris-Bordeaux-Paris race, with number 46.
