= Peugeot Type 4 =

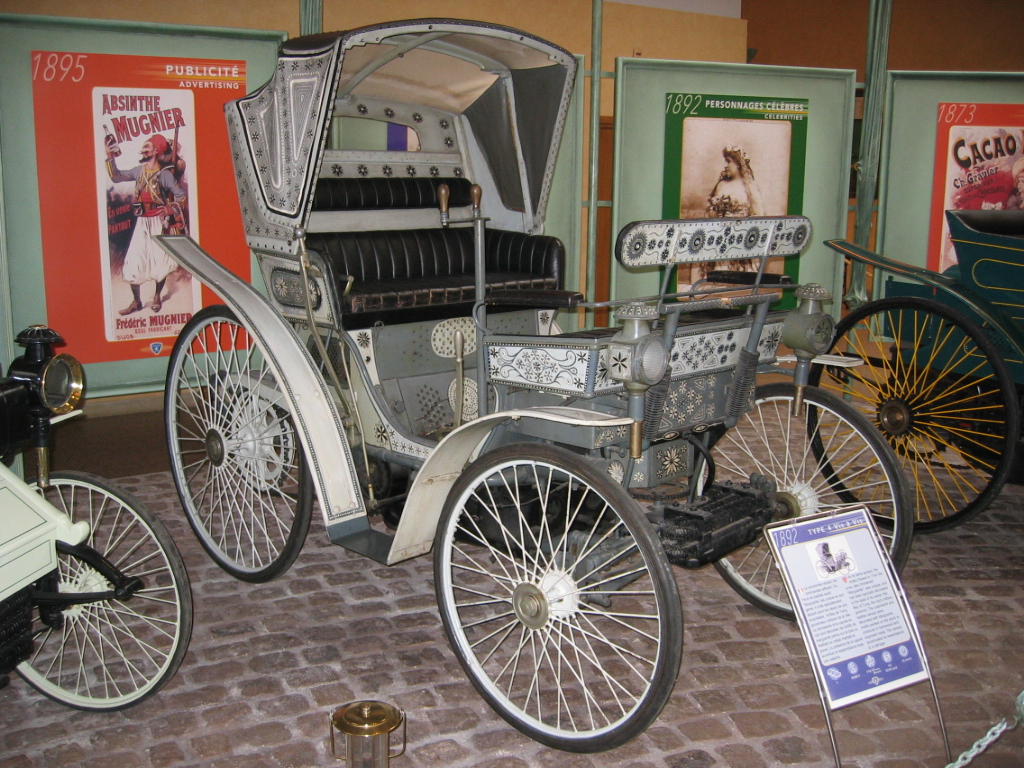

Overview
- Manufacturer: S. A. des Automobiles Peugeot
- Production: 1892; 1 produced

Body and chassis
- Body style: Runabout
- Layout: RR layout

Powertrain
- Engine: 1.0 L V-twin

Dimensions
- Wheelbase: 1.63 metres (64 in)

Chronology
- Predecessor: Peugeot Type 3
- Successor: Peugeot Type 5

The Peugeot Type 4 was a one-off car produced by Peugeot in 1892 for Ali III ibn al-Husayn, the Bey of Tunis, in accordance with whose wishes the car was decorated.

== Details ==
The Type 4 was made with a 1.0 L (1026 cc) 15-degree V-twin engine that produced 4 horsepower. The 0.6 L (565 cc) engine in the Peugeot Type 3 was considered to be insufficient, and produced half as much power. The elaborately decorated car survives and is kept at Sochaux, France.
