= Benz Velo =

Benz Velocipede
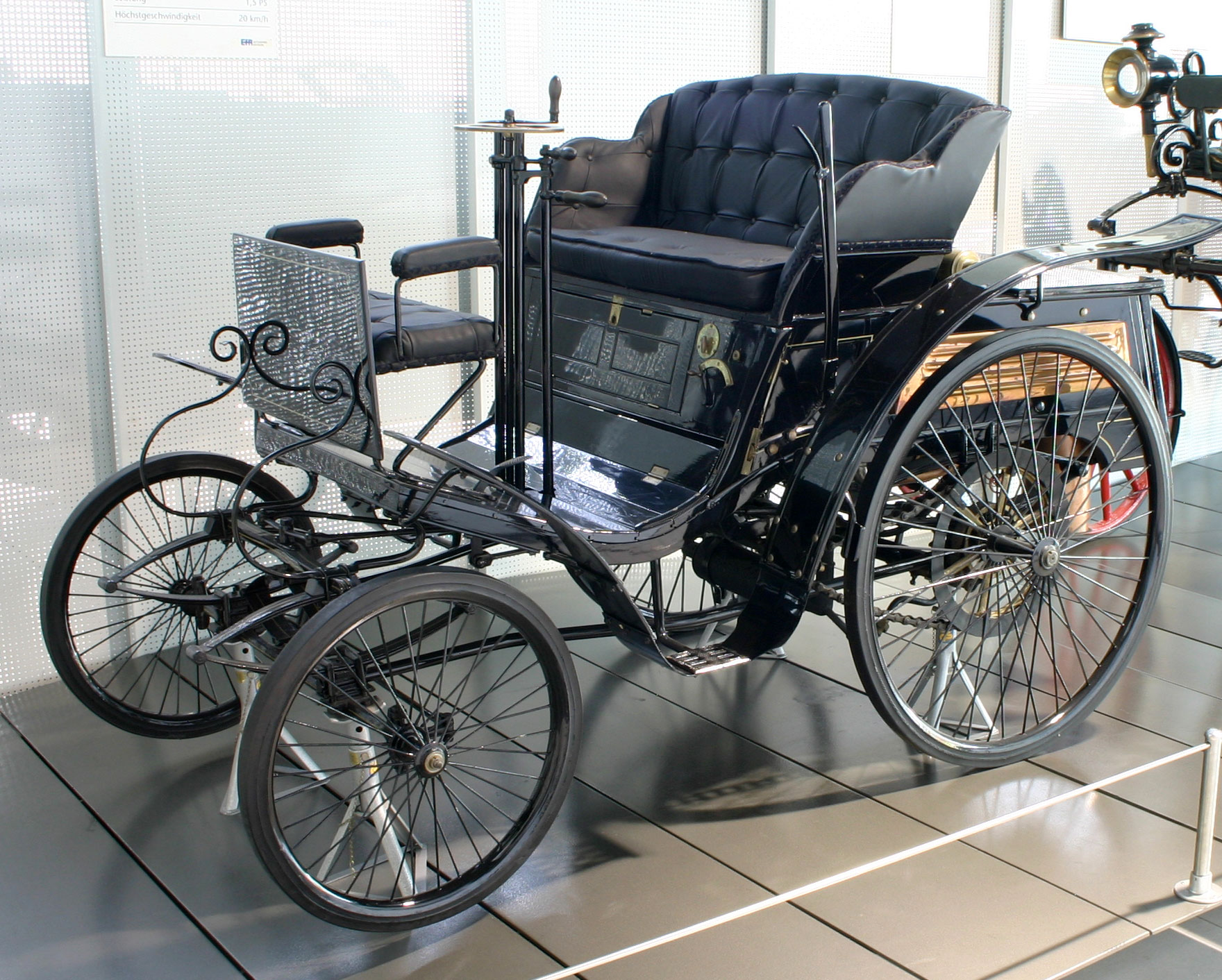

Overview
- Manufacturer: Rheinische Gasmotorenfabrik Benz & Cie.
- Also called: Benz Velo; Benz Ideal
- Production: 1894–1902
- Designer: Karl Benz

Body and chassis
- Layout: RR layout

Powertrain
- Engine: 1.0L (1,045 cc (63.8 cu in)) single
- Power output: 1.5–3 brake horsepower (1.1–2.2 kW; 1.5–3.0 PS) @ 450 rpm 4.4–5.2 newton-metres (3.2–3.8 lb⋅ft)
- Transmission: 3-speed automatic

Dimensions
- Curb weight: 280–320 kilograms (620–710 lb)

Chronology
- Predecessor: Benz Patent-Motorwagen

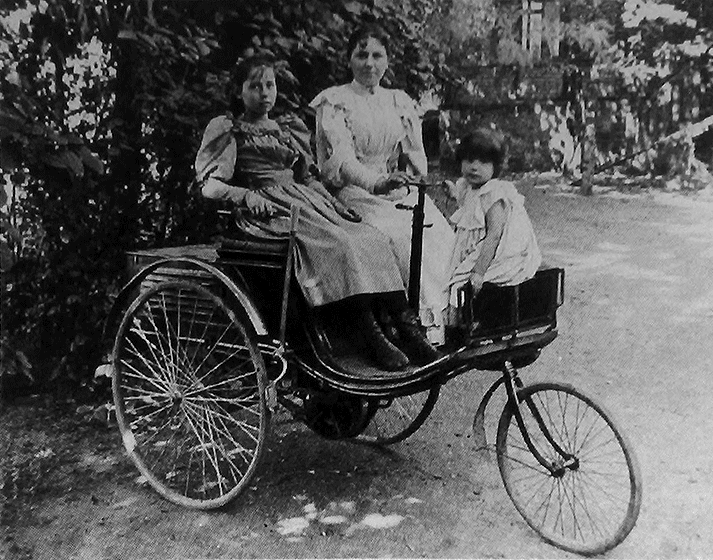
Daughters of Benz sitting on a 3-wheeled prototype of the Benz Velo c.1893. The youngest child, Ellen, was born in 1890.

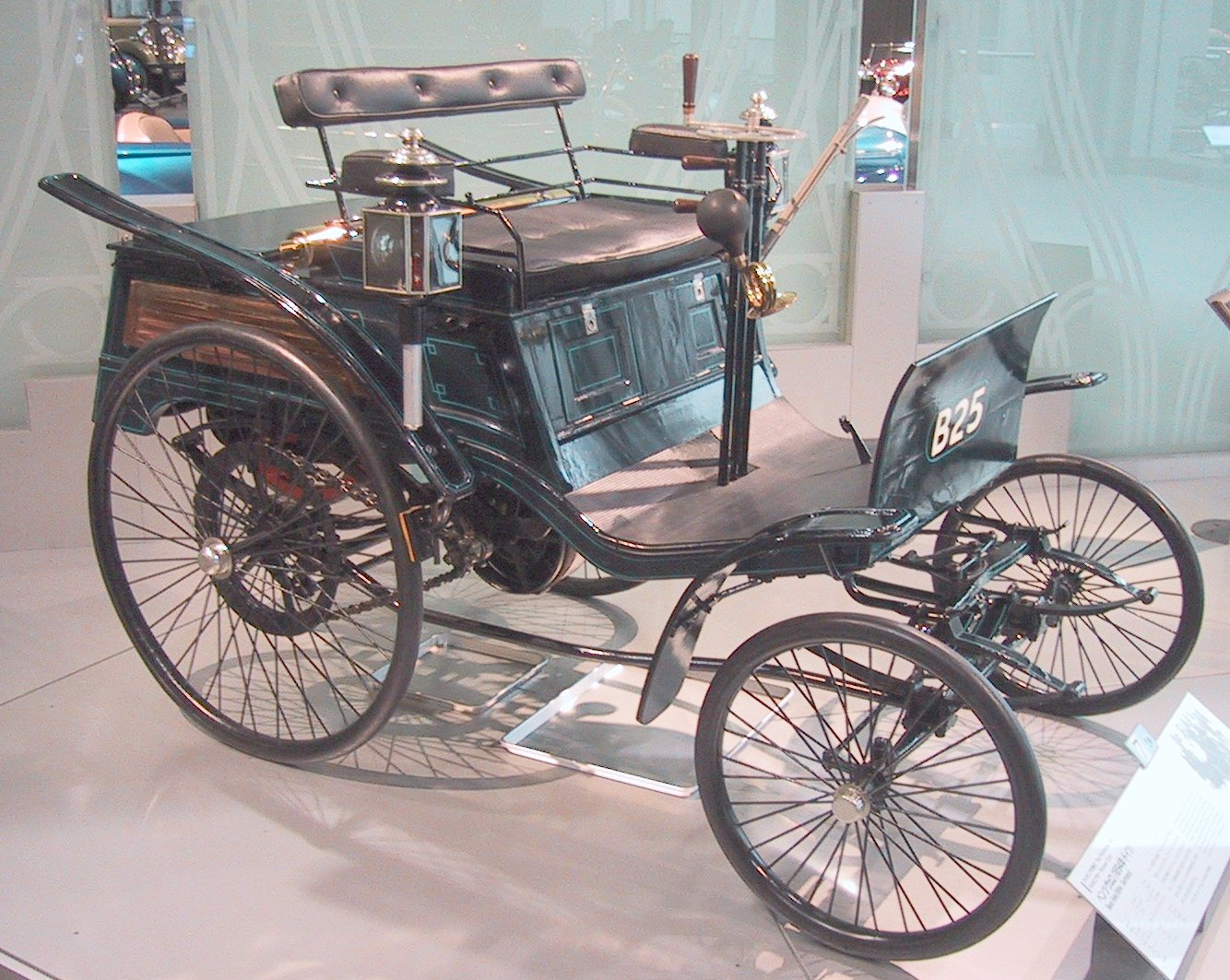
Benz Velo at the Toyota Automobile Museum

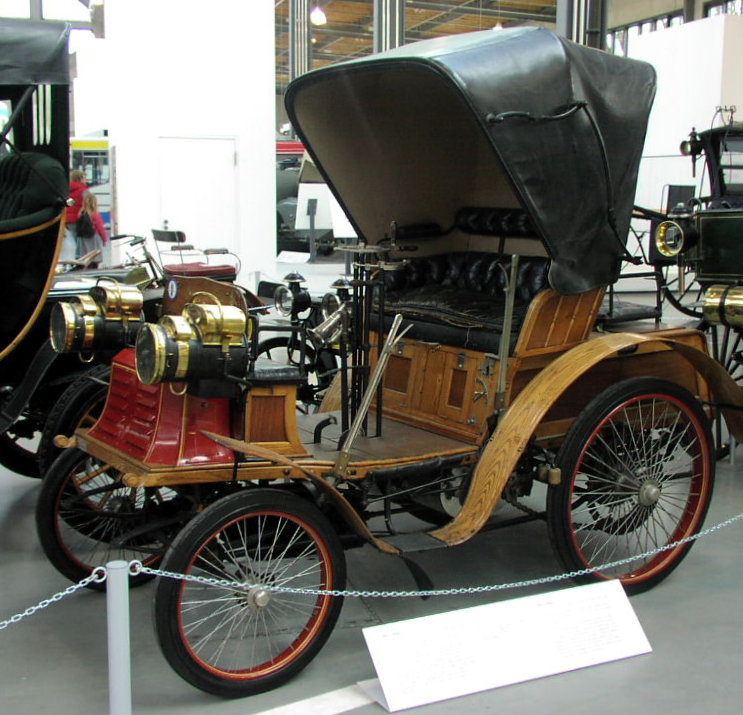
Benz Ideal

The Benz Velo was one of the first cars, introduced by Carl Benz in 1894 as the followup to the Patent-Motorwagen. 67 Benz Velos were built in 1894 and 134 in 1895. The early Velo had a 1L 1.5-metric-horsepower (1.5 hp; 1.1 kW) engine, and later a 3-metric-horsepower (3 hp; 2 kW) engine giving a top speed of 19 km/h (12 mph). The Velo was officially introduced by Benz as the Velocipede, and became the world's first standardized serial production car. The Velocipede remained in production between 1894 and 1902, with a final count of over 1,200 produced.

== Preceding events and history ==
Carl Benz patented the world's first stationary, two-stroke internal combustion engine. His engines were in great demand, which led Benz to move his operations in 1886 to a new factory on Waldhofstrasse in Mannheim (operating until 1908).

Benz's dream, however, was to apply the internal combustion engine to create a horseless carriage. He started working on this in 1884 and had his first prototype, a motorised two-seat tricycle known as Motorwagen Nr. 1, running in 1885.

He applied for a patent for this on 29 January 1886, which was granted on 2 November 1886. Meanwhile, he had built a new prototype, Motorwagen Nr.2, around the engine, which he continued to develop. This was a much better vehicle and is regarded as the first practical car. After further development, the Patent-Motorwagen (still a tricycle) was manufactured between 1887 and 1893.

After perfecting two-wheel steering with suspen-sion, Benz began making four-wheeled cars in 1893: these were larger, more expensive models such as the Vis-a-vis and the Viktoria.

The Benz Velo was the true successor to the Patent-Motorwagen, being a smaller, lighter vehicle. It returned to Benz's first prototype in its use of light wire-wheels, as in cycles. A three-wheel prototype of the Velo was created in 1893 and later used by the Benz children.

== Influences ==
=== Following automobiles ===
The Velo also inspired numerous copies, including Marshall (later Belsize) in Manchester, Star (Wolverhampton), and Arnold (Paddock Wood, of which only twelve were built). Benz's Velo was particularly popular in France, where a Parisian bicycle manufacturer by the name of Émile Roger had been building Benz engines under license from Karl Benz. Roger began building Benz automobiles as well, and as a result, a majority of Benz automobiles were sold in France initially.

Many British Inventors also used Benz's patents and automobiles as starting points for their own innovations. Frederick W. Lanchester, of Birmingham, built a four-wheeled petrol-driven automobile, similar to units previously designed by Benz, which had utilized an electric starter (an adaptation first seen in the Benz Velo).

A Velo was the first car introduced to South Africa, where it was demonstrated to then President Paul Kruger on 4 January 1897.

=== The first automobile race ===
Karl Benz's Velo participated in the world's first automobile race. A Parisian daily newspaper, by the name of Le Petit Journal, organized the race. The editors of Le Petit intended to display horseless carriages as a viable means of transportation. Rather than fastest time, the automobiles would be judged on whether they were safe and cost effective to operate. It took place in 1894, starting in Paris and ending in Rouen. The winners of the Paris-Rouen race were Panhard & Levassor (Panhard) and Peugeot, both French manufacturers using Benz internal combustion engines. The Velo placed fifth overall in Le Petit's race. Benz had proven with this race that his engines and his automobiles were not only attainable but also safe and reliable to operate. Eventually, manufacturers began optimizing automobile design for racing. In addition to promoting Benz and his automobiles, the Paris-Rouen race gave birth to modern Motorsport, which now includes the likes of Formula One.

== See also ==
- List of automotive superlatives
- Timeline of most powerful production cars
- List of Mercedes-Benz vehicles (includes section on Benz vehicles)
- Benz Viktoria
