= Traffic paddle =

Hand held traffic control device

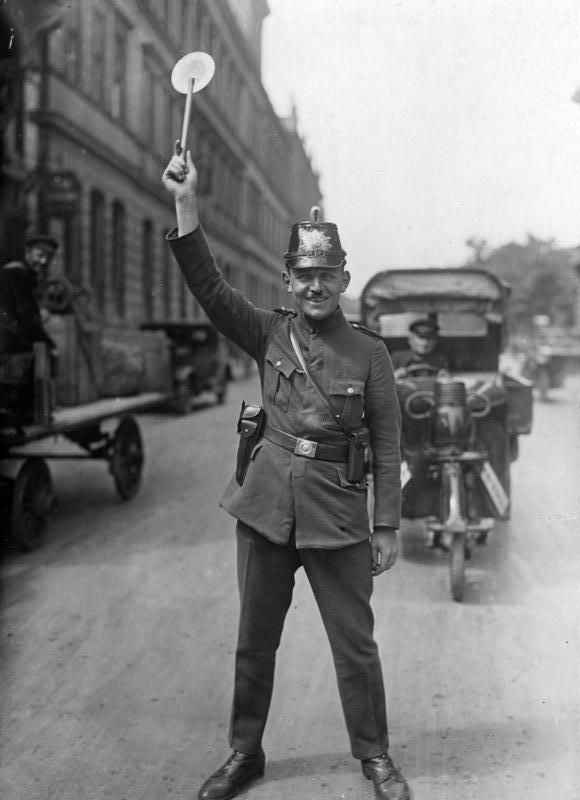
A German policeman during traffic control in 1924

A traffic paddle is a hand-held paddle-shaped signal used by police, traffic wardens, fire brigade, airport ground staff and others to direct traffic.

== See also ==
- Road Traffic Control
