= Peugeot Type 1 =

Peugeot Type 1 / Serpollet Tricycle
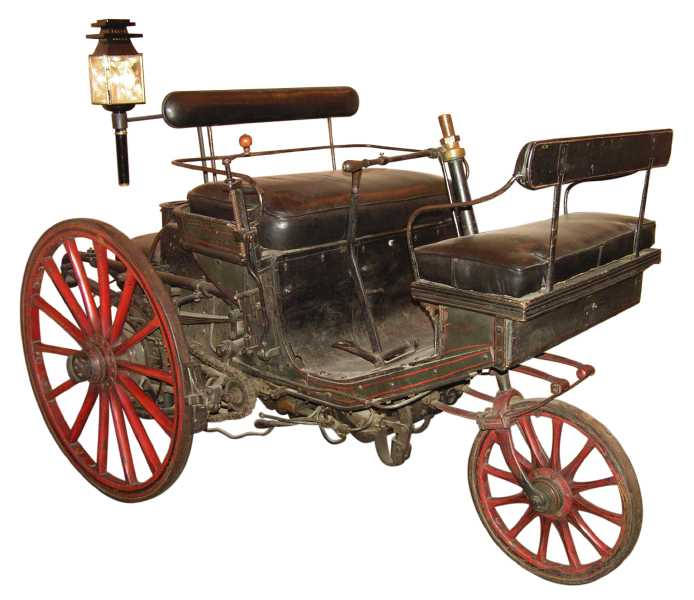

Overview
- Manufacturer: S. A. des Automobiles Peugeot
- Also called: Peugeot 1
- Production: 1886–1890

Powertrain
- Engine: two-cylinder steam engine 4–6 PS (4–6 hp; 3–4.5 kW)

Chronology
- Successor: Peugeot Type 2

The Serpollet Tricycle/Peugeot Type 1 is a small steam three-wheeler, produced by Peugeot in 1886. It is the first Peugeot car ever made.

The Serpollet Tricycle was one of the first industrially manufactured motor vehicles; it was designed by Léon Serpollet, and first presented in 1886. The three-wheeler possessed an oil-fired boiler and a single-cylinder engine with poppet valves and crank cases. The steam three-wheeler of 1899 produced about 5 PS (5 hp; 3.5 kW) with its 4 cylinders. It achieved a maximum speed of about 25 km/h (16 mph).
