= Paris–Bordeaux–Paris =

Former trail race

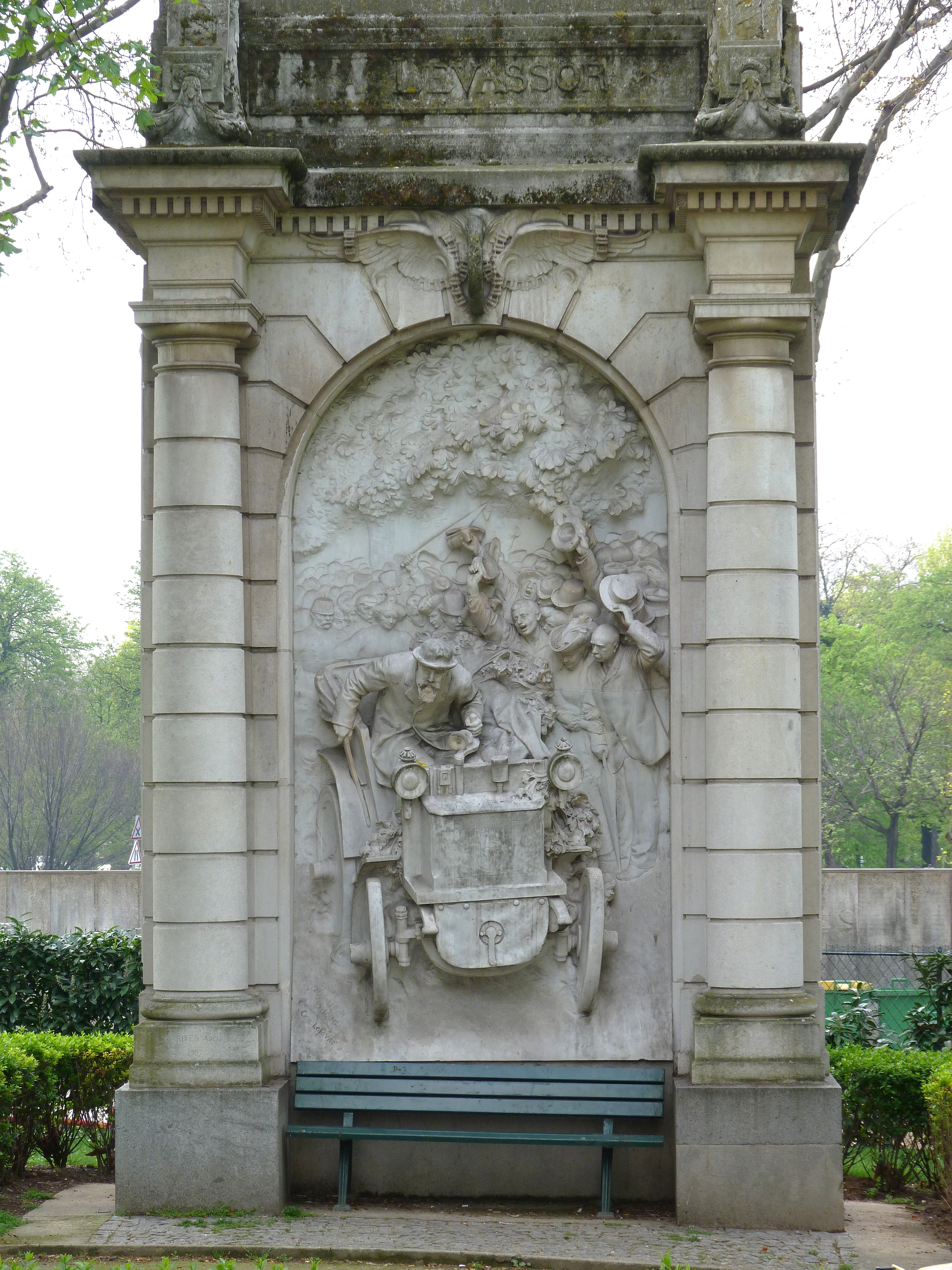
- Venue: Road from Paris to Bordeaux (and return)
- Location: France
- First race: 11 June 1895 (unique race); 30 entrants 21 qualified 12 stopped
- Distance: 1,178 kilometres (732 mi)

The Paris–Bordeaux–Paris Trail race of June 1895 is sometimes called the "first motor race", although it did not fit modern competition where the fastest is the winner. It was a win for Émile Levassor, who came first after completing the 1,178km race in 48 hours, almost six hours before second place. However, the official winner was Paul Koechlin, who finished third in his Peugeot, exactly 11 hours slower than Levassor, but the official race regulations had been established for four-seater cars, while Levassor and runner-up Louis Rigoulot were driving two-seater cars.

== First race ==
Paris–Bordeaux–Paris is sometimes called the first motorcar race in history or the "first motor race". The 1894 Paris–Rouen had been run over public roads as a contest (concours) not a race, and the fastest finisher, a steam-powered vehicle, was judged ineligible for the main prize. Émile Levassor finished first in the 1,178 km Paris–Bordeaux–Paris race, taking 48 hours and 48 minutes, nearly six hours before the runner-up Louis Rigoulot, and eleven hours before the official winner, Paul Koechlin in his Peugeot. Officially, the race was for four-seater cars, and Levassor and Rigoulot drove two-seater cars. The ensuing outcry caused the A.C.F. to organise their next event, the 1896 Paris–Marseille–Paris, so that the fastest finisher was the winner.

== Name ==
The race is sometimes referred to as the I Grand Prix de l'A.C.F. This results from a retrospective political move that began in the early 1920s when French media represented many races held in France before the 1906 French Grand Prix as being Grands Prix de l'Automobile Club de France, despite their running pre-dating the formation of the Club. Hence, the 1906 race was said to have been the 9th edition of the Grand Prix de l'Automobile Club de France. The ACF itself adopted this reasoning in 1933, although some members of the Club dismissed it, "concerned the name of the Club was lent to the fiction simply out of a childish desire to establish their Grand Prix as the oldest race in the world".

== Levassor's progress ==
Levassor, who drove one of his cars, a 1205 cc (74 ci) Panhard & Levassor, started carefully, observing his opponents; he overtook the then leading Marquis de Dion who stopped to take on water for his steam car. Levassor led the race since then, stopping regularly to check his car's components. He came to Bordeaux several hours before any driver was expected to come which resulted in the fact that he had to drive back to Paris as well (the driver who was his change was still asleep in a hotel, and no one knew which one). Levassor accepted the situation calmly, waking the organisers up to prove his coming and his time, had some sandwiches and champagne, took a brief walk and set off for Paris at 2:30 am. When Baron René de Knyff met him en-route, he was so surprised by Levassor's time that he nearly crashed. Levassor, after spending two days and nights behind the wheel, triumphantly reached Paris, achieving an average speed of 24.5 km/h. He said after the race: "Some 50 km before Paris I had a rather luxurious snack in a restaurant which helped me. But I feel a little tired."

== Legacy ==
The race proved that both the drivers and the cars were capable of such distances and it generated public enthusiasm which indicated that such events were commercially viable.

== Results ==
=== Overall ===
The overall results were:

Pos	No.	Driver	Car	Time	Notes
1	5	Émile Levassor	Panhard & Levassor	48:48:00	24.54 km/h Ineligible for First prize – 2 seater
2	15	Louis Rigoulot	Peugeot	54:35:00	Ineligible for First prize – 2 seater
3	16	Paul Koechlin	Peugeot	59:48:00	Named as the winner, received the main prize.
4	8	Auguste Doriot	Peugeot	59:49:00	
5	12	Hans Thum	Benz / Roger	64:30:00	
6	7	Émile Mayade	Panhard & Levassor	72:14:00	
7	28	Rene de Knyff	Panhard & Levassor	78:07:00	
8	13	Émile Roger	Roger	82:48:00	
9	24	Amédée Bollée	Bollée	90:03:00	

=== Did not finish ===
Entrants who did not finish:

Driver	No.	Car	Notes
André Michelin	46	L'Éclair	Orléans (B)/Tyre Trouble – Finished outside time limit.
Léon Serpollet	20	Gardner-Serpollet	Poitiers (B)/Broken Crank Shaft
Paul Thaillier	37	Vincke et Delmer	Angouleme
Hildebrand		Wolfmuller	Angouleme
Charles Prévost	6	Panhard & Levassor	Angouleme/Broken Wheel-Disqualified
Gaston de Chasseloup-Laubat	3	De Dion-Bouton	Vouvray/Broken Shaft
Charles Jeanteaud	25	Jeanteaud	Orléans/Axle Trouble
Millet	42	Millet	Orléans
		Gardner-Serpollet	Versailles
P. Gautier	18	Gautier-Wehrlé	(Poss. Pierre or Charles Gautier)
	26	Rossel	
Unknown	43	Gautier-Wehrlé	(Poss. Pierre or Charles Gautier)

=== Entrants ===
Entrants in order of departure:

Depart order	No.	Driver	Car	Notes
1	15	Louis Rigoulot	Peugeot	petrol
2	3	Comte de Chasseloup Laubat	De Dion-Bouton	steam
3	8	Auguste Doriot	Peugeot	petrol
4	35		Vacheron	petrol – Did not finish
5	12	Hans Thum	Benz – Roger	petrol
6	5	Émile Levassor	Panhard et Levassor	petrol
7	19		Lebrun et Duval	petrol – Did not finish
8	24	Amédée Bollée	Bollée	steam
9	27		Bogard	electric – Did not finish
10	32		Lepape	petrol – Did not finish
11	16	A. Koechlin	Panhard et Levassor	petrol
12	6	Prévost	Peugeot	petrol
13	22		Compagnie des moteurs légers	petrol – Did not finish
14	10		Decauville	steam – Did not finish
15	20	Leon Serpollet	Serpollet	steam
16	21		Serpollet	steam
17	43		Gautier–Wehrlé	steam
18	18	P. Gautier	Gautier (motorcar)	petrol
19	7	Émile Mayade	Panhard et Levassor	petrol
20	13	Émile Roger	Roger	petrol
21	46	André Michelin	L'Éclair of Michelin	petrol – Did not finish
22	25	Charles Jeanteaud	Jeantaud	electric
23	1	Jules-Albert de Dion	De Dion-Bouton 20 HP	steam
24	37	Fréderic (Paul Thaillier)	Vincke	petrol
25	28		Panhard et Levassor	petrol
26	40		Delannoy	petrol – Did not finish
27	14		Ducan et Suberbie	steam – Cycle
28	37		Millet	petrol – Cycle – Did not finish
29	28	Boulanger	Briest	petrol – Cycle – Did not finish
30	42		Marc Létang	steam – Cycle

== See also ==
- Motorsport before 1906
- Paris–Rouen, 1894
- 1896 Paris–Marseille–Paris
