= Benz Viktoria =

Vehicle produced by Benz and Cie. from 1893 to 1900

Benz Patent-Motorwagen Viktoria
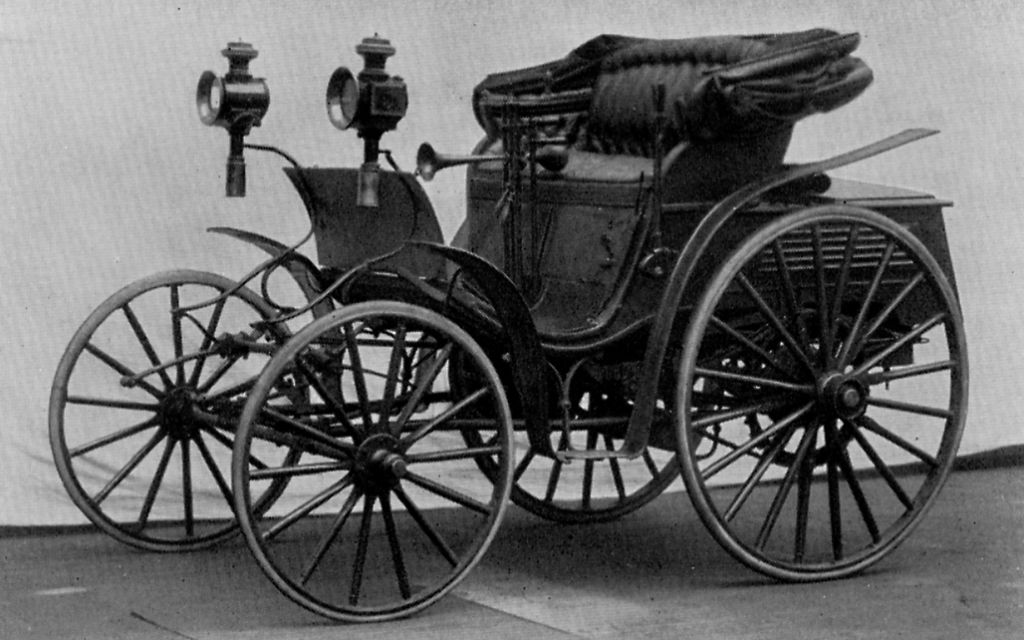

Overview
- Manufacturer: Benz and Cie.
- Also called: Benz Viktoria
- Production: 1892 – 1900

Body and chassis
- Body style: Phaeton
- Layout: RR layout

Powertrain
- Engine: 1,730–2,915 cc (105.6–177.9 cu in) single-cylinder
- Transmission: 2-speed, 3-speed available later

Dimensions
- Curb weight: 650 kilograms (1,430 lb)

Chronology
- Successor: Benz Dos-à-Dos

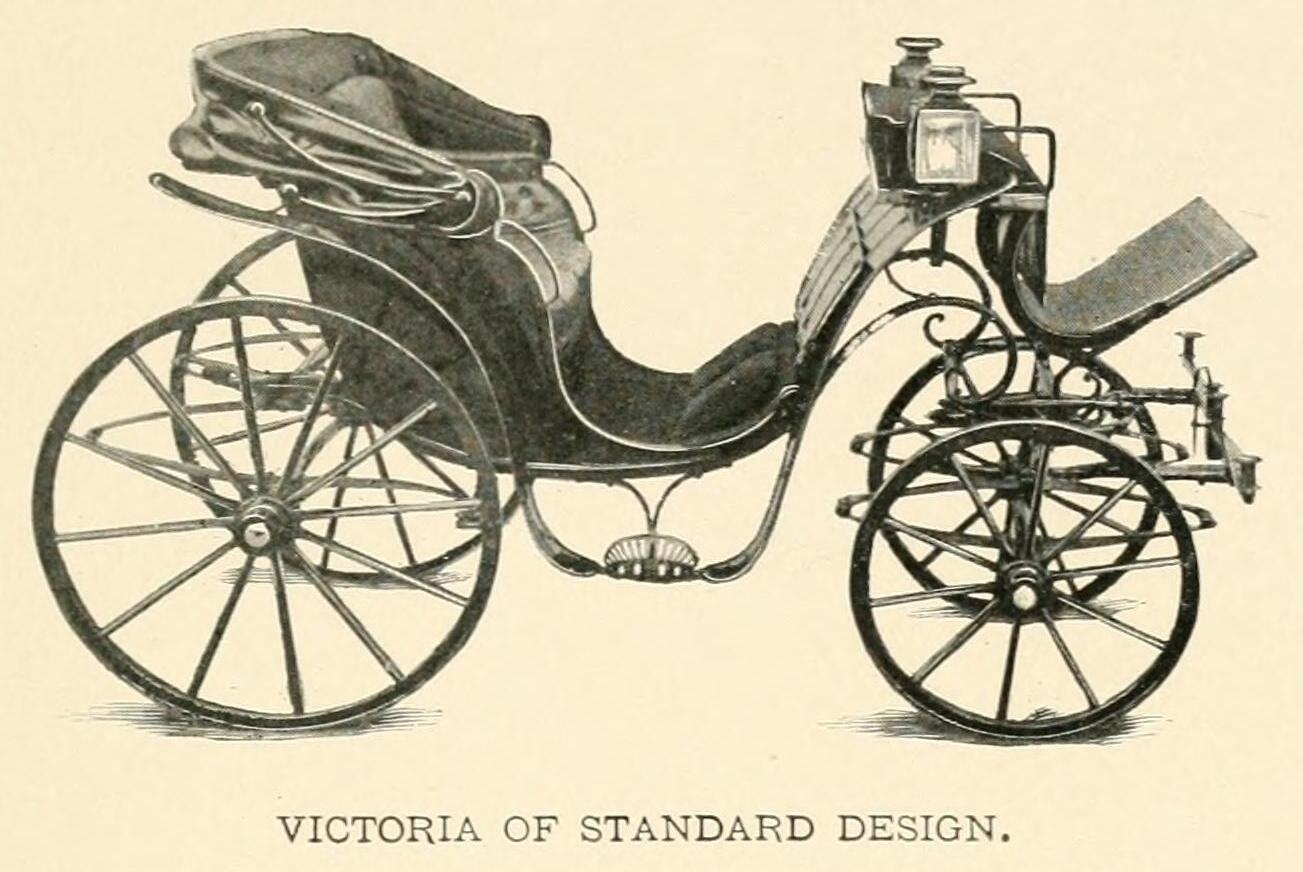
Victoria carriage c.1900

The Benz Patent-Motorwagen Viktoria is the name by which 4-wheeled cars produced by Benz & Cie. from 1892 (Note: A Benz & Cie brochure of early 1893 includes a testimonial of 5 February 1893 from L. Broeg of Marburg stating that in October 1892 he received a Benz Motorwagen with 4 seats. As the 3-wheel 4-seat Model 2 had not been sold since 1888, this must have been one of the new 4-wheel cars.) to 1900 came to be known because they were modelled on a Victoria horse-drawn carriage. Several variants were produced, which bore names including Vis-à-vis, Phaeton, Landaulet and Mylord because they were modelled on the corresponding horse-drawn carriage.

== Vehicles ==
The first car brought to, and used in, Västerbotten, Sweden was a Benz Viktoria. In 1900, Jon Haraldsson Hedin, a pharmacist from Lycksele, purchased a Viktoria in Stockholm for 5,000 kr, approximately the value of 300,000 kr in 2020.

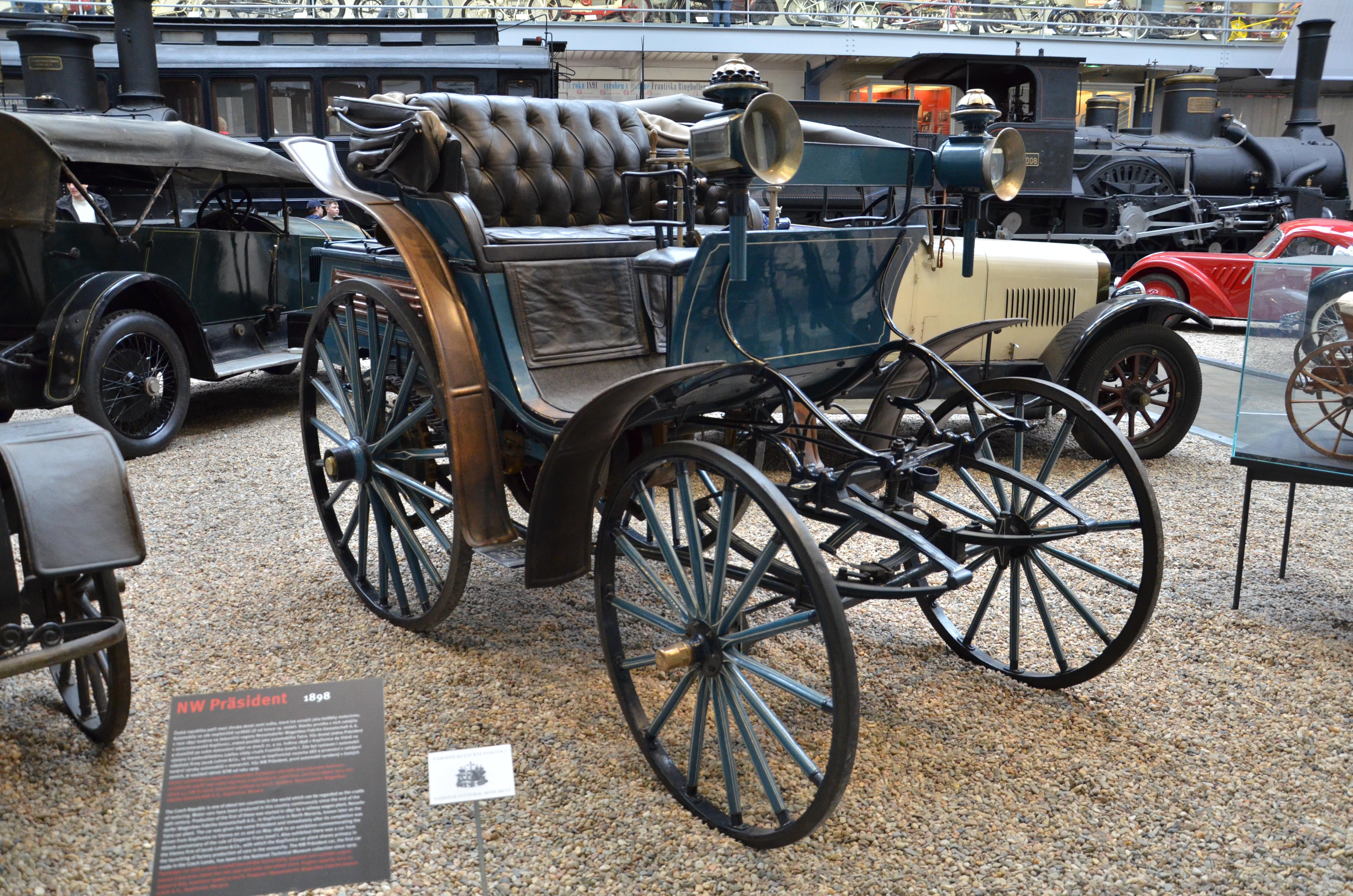
Benz Victoria in National Technical Museum in Prague

Vehicle number 99, located in the car museum of Einbeck, is street-legal in Germany. The first modern general inspection took place in April 2019. The local department of motor vehicles issued an allowance for usage at daytime and in good weather conditions, so that no additional vehicle lighting needed to be installed. The usage of a traffic paddle is still legal in Germany as a direction indicator for historic cars. Regular inspection was renewed in 2023.

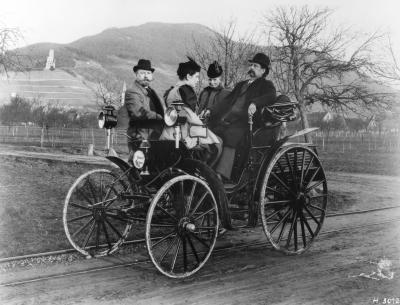
Karl and Bertha Benz, their daughter Clara and Fritz Held on a Benz Victoria during a trip near Schriesheim in 1894

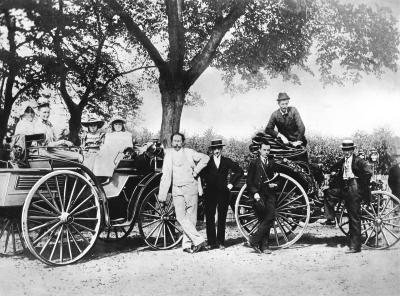
Karl Benz, his family and Baron Theodor von Liebieg in 1894, on a trip from Mannheim to Gernsheim driving a Benz Victoria and a Vis-à-Vis Benz Patent Motor Car

=== Models ===
| Years produced | Engine displacement | Bore × stroke | Power output | at |
|---|---|---|---|---|
| 1893–1896 | 1,730 cc (106 cu in) | 130 mm (5.1 in) × 130 mm (5.1 in) | 3 horsepower (2.2 kW) | 450 rpm |
| 1894–1895 | 1,990 cc (121 cu in) | 130 mm (5.1 in) × 150 mm (5.9 in) | 4 horsepower (3.0 kW) | 500 rpm |
| 1895–1898 | 2,650 cc (162 cu in) | 150 mm (5.9 in) × 150 mm (5.9 in) | 5 horsepower (3.7 kW) | 600 rpm |
| 1898–1900 | 2,915 cc (177.9 cu in) | 150 mm (5.9 in) × 165 mm (6.5 in) | 6 horsepower (4.5 kW) | 700 rpm |

== See also ==
- List of Mercedes-Benz vehicles
- Benz Velo
