= Tissandier =

Tissandier is a surname, and may refer to:

- Gaston Tissandier (1843–1899), French chemist, meteorologist, aviator and editor
- Albert Tissandier (1839–1906), Gaston's brother, French architect, aviator, illustrator, editor and archaeologist
- Paul Tissandier (1881–1945), Gaston's son, French aviator
  - The Paul Tissandier Diploma, awarded in honour of Paul Tissandier
