= Lepape =

Lepape is a surname. Notable people with the surname include:

- Georges Lepape (1887–1971), French poster artist, illustrator, and fashion designer
- Pierre Lepape (1941–2021), French journalist, writer, and literary critic
- Sébastien Lepape (born 1991), French short track speed skater
