= Chauveau =

Chauveau is a French surname. Notable people with the surname include:

- Alexandre Chauveau (1847–1916), lawyer, judge and educator
- Auguste Chauveau (1827–1917), professor and veterinarian
- Claude François Chauveau-Lagarde (1756–1841), lawyer in Paris
- Claude Chauveau (1861–1940), French politician
- François Chauveau (1613–1676), French engraver
- Jean-Pierre Chauveau (born 1942), a member of the Senate of France
- Michel Chauveau (born 1956), French historian and Egyptologist
- Pierre-Joseph-Olivier Chauveau (1820–1890), the first premier of the Canadian province of Quebec
- Sophie Chauveau (born 1999), a French biathlete
- Sylvain Chauveau (born 1971), an instrumental music and electronic music artist and composer from Bayonne, France
- Yves Chauveau (born 1945), a French retired professional football goalkeeper

== See also ==
- Chauveau (electoral district)
- Chauveau Point
- Pierre Chauveau Medal
