= Peugeot Type 2 =

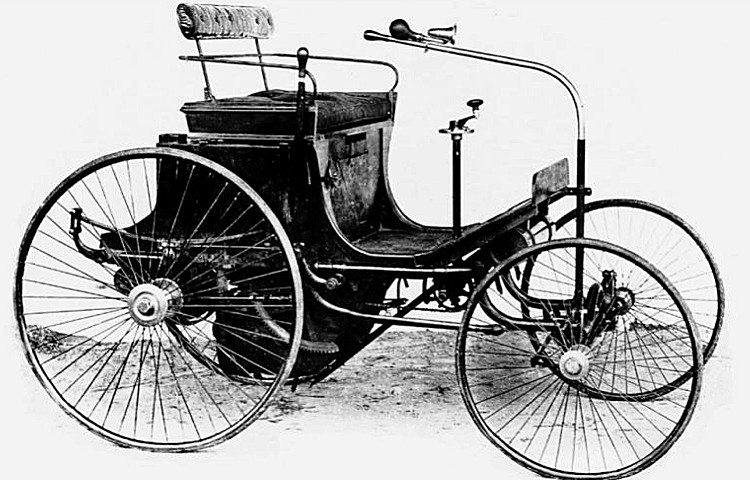

Overview
- Manufacturer: Peugeot
- Production: 1890–1891; 4 made

Body and chassis
- Class: small car
- Layout: RR layout

Dimensions
- Wheelbase: 1,400 mm (55.1 in)
- Length: 2,300 mm (90.6 in)
- Width: 1,350 mm (53.1 in)
- Height: 1,450 mm (57.1 in)

Chronology
- Predecessor: Peugeot Type 1
- Successor: Peugeot Type 3

The Peugeot Type 2 is the first petrol/gasoline-powered motor vehicle produced between 1890 and 1891 by the French auto-maker Peugeot at their Valentigney plant. The car was presented just two years after Armand Peugeot had split away from the Peugeot family business in order to concentrate on cars, with a separate Peugeot Automobiles business.

== History ==
In 1889 Peugeot attended that year's Paris Universal Exhibition, where he was demonstrating four of his Peugeot Type 1 prototypes, which were powered by steam engines (from Léon Serpollet). The Type 1 received a tepid reception, and Peugeot was already aware of the limitations arising from the vibration profile and sheer weight of a steam engine in this type of car-sized powered vehicle.

The visit to the exhibition was not wasted, however, as he also came across the revolutionary invention of Gottlieb Daimler, a reciprocating combustion engine powered by petrol/gasoline. As soon as the exhibition was over Daimler arranged for his engine to be assembled in France by Panhard et Levassor of Paris and came to an agreement with Peugeot for its use in a new quadricycle. Peugeot was also able to negotiate with the widow of Edouard Sarazin. Sarazin's acquisition, before he died, of the rights to manufacture the Daimler combustion engine in France, made his widow, Louise, a key figure in the early life of the motor industry in France, which would be the world's top auto producing nation till out-produced by the United States in 1906.

Approximately a year after Armand Peugeot's eventful visit to Paris, the Peugeot Type 2 appeared, to be followed by the Type 3, which events together marked the inauguration of the Peugeot automobile business.

== Performance ==
The Peugeot Type 2 was powered by a two-cylinder four stroke V-format petrol/gasoline engine, assembled under licence from Daimler. The engine was mounted underneath the seat, above and slightly ahead of the rear axle to which it was linked by a chain-drive. 2.0 PS (2 hp; 1.5 kW) of power was provided from the 565-cubic-centimetre (34.5 cu in) unit. A maximum speed of 18 km/h (11 mph) was recorded. Engine cooling in the 1880s was a challenge for the combustion engine. To solve this, the Type 2's engine incorporated tubes filled with water, adumbrating the radiator that would be an essential feature of many combustion engines in the ensuing centuries.

A wheelbase of 1,400 mm (55.1 in) supported a vehicle length of 2,300 mm (90.6 in). The width and height were respectively 1,350 mm (53.1 in) and 1,450 mm (57.1 in). A rudimentary suspension system pointed the way ahead regarding what would become another mainstream feature of the motor car.

The main Peugeot business was, at this time, expanding rapidly its bicycle production, and the Type 2’s light weight may have incorporated lessons learned from cycle production. Four Type 2s were produced. Three were quadricycles while the fourth was a tricycle. They all had space for two on the bench above the engine.
