= Godsal =

Godsal Sports Tourer

Overview
- Type: Sports car
- Manufacturer: Research Engineers Ltd
- Model code: 001
- Production: 1935 (only one produced)
- Assembly: London
- Designer: Charles Godsal

Body and chassis
- Class: Roadster
- Body style: 2-seat, open top
- Layout: Front-engine, rear-wheel-drive
- Doors: 2
- Chassis: Right hand drive, sliding pillar front suspension with live rear axle, 4-wheel drum brakes

Powertrain
- Engine: Ford Flathead V8 engine
- Power output: Approximately: 85 bhp (63 kW; 86 PS) at 5,500 rpm
- Transmission: Riley preselector manual

The Godsal Sports Tourer is a unique, one-off, sports car designed in 1935 by Charles Godsal (1907–1965), son of barrister and inventor Herbert Godsal, and built by Research Engineers Ltd of London.

The Godsal incorporates a contemporary Ford Flathead V8 engine with single twin-choke carburettor achieving approximately 85 bhp (63 kW; 86 PS) at 5,500 rpm, a 4-speed Riley preselector transmission, a sliding pillar front suspension with live rear axle, 4-wheel drum brakes, and coachwork by Corsica Coachworks.

The Godsal featured prominently in the 1969 film Mosquito Squadron.

The car featured in an episode of the MotorTrend programme Chasing Classic Cars with Wayne Carini where it was completely re-restored at Carini's F40 Motorsports in Connecticut.

Re-restored at F40 Motorsports after its original purchase by Bob Morris in 2017 for $203,500 including premium, it took top prize in the Amelia Island Concours d'Elegance of 2020.

It was auctioned at Amelia on 20 May 2021 by Bonhams, but was unsold after a high bid of $620,000 that did not meet the reserve price; however, it was later sold that day by Bonhams for an undisclosed amount.
