= List of Chasing Classic Cars episodes =

The following is a complete episode list of 2000s and 2010s US television documentary series Chasing Classic Cars starring Wayne Carini, who finds and chases classic cars from all eras, with the option of restoration and a likely sale.

== Series overview ==
Season	Episodes	Originally released	
Season	Episodes	First released	Last released
1	13	June 3, 2008	January 7, 2009
2	13	October 6, 2009	December 30, 2009
3	13	October 5, 2010	December 5, 2010
4	13	October 2, 2011	December 20, 2011
5	26	April 3, 2012	January 2, 2013
6	26	May 7, 2013	March 4, 2014
7	16	July 28, 2014	December 6, 2014
8	11	May 5, 2015	July 21, 2015
9	11	October 22, 2015	January 12, 2016
10	13	May 31, 2016	August 30, 2016
11	9	March 15, 2017	May 10, 2017
12	10	August 15, 2017	November 2, 2017
13	6	June 26, 2018	July 31, 2018
14	4	March 20, 2019	April 10, 2019
15	10	February 6, 2020	April 9, 2020
16	5	October 20, 2020	November 24, 2020
17	5	July 21, 2021	August 18, 2021

== Episodes ==
=== Season 1 (2008–09) ===
No. overall	No. in season	Title	Original release date
1	1	"Bugatti Barn Find"	June 3, 2008
2	2	"Monterey Madness"	June 10, 2008
3	3	"Auction at Amelia Island: Part 1"	June 17, 2008
4	4	"Auction at Amelia Island: Part 2"	June 24, 2008
5	5	"Herb's Ferrari"	October 28, 2008
6	6	"Internet Flips & Finds"	November 4, 2008
7	7	"Hunt for the Davis"	November 11, 2008
8	8	"Intrigue in Greenwich"	November 18, 2008
9	9	"Porsches, Porsches, Porsches!"	November 25, 2008
10	10	"Wayne Goes Racing"	December 2, 2008
11	11	"Shelby vs. Ferrari"	December 9, 2008
12	12	"Muntz Jet at Pebble"	December 16, 2008
13	13	"Jag E Type"	January 27, 2009

=== Season 2 (2009) ===
No. overall	No. in season	Title	Original release date
14	1	"Cobras!"	October 6, 2009
15	2	"Amelia Island: FLY Yellow"	October 6, 2009
16	3	"Duesenberg Barn Find"	October 13, 2009
17	4	"Jaguars at Greenwich"	October 20, 2009
18	5	"Chevy"	November 1, 2009
19	6	"Bimbo Racer"	November 10, 2009
20	7	"Meadow Brook"	November 10, 2009
21	8	"Everybody Loves a Woodie"	November 17, 2009
22	9	"Muntz Jet"	November 24, 2009
23	10	"Bora & Bentley"	December 1, 2009
24	11	"Bentleys"	December 8, 2009
25	12	"Ferrari 375MM Barn Find"	December 15, 2009
26	13	"Multipla"	December 30, 2009

=== Season 3 (2010) ===
No. overall	No. in season	Title	Original release date
27	1	"57 Heaven!"	October 5, 2010
28	2	"Going Platinum!"	October 5, 2010
29	3	"The British are Coming!"	October 19, 2010
30	4	"The Cover Girls are Back!"	October 26, 2010
31	5	"Time Loves a Hero!"	December 14, 2010
32	6	"Road Trip!"	November 9, 2010
33	7	"Tent Find the New Barn Find?"	November 16, 2010
34	8	"Everything Must Go!"	November 23, 2010
35	9	"The Quest for Perfection"	November 30, 2010
36	10	"Wayne Won't You Buy Me a Mercedes Benz?"	December 7, 2010
37	11	"The Lemons Are Coming!"	December 14, 2010
38	12	"Now That's a Duesy!"	December 21, 2010
39	13	"Monterey Madness"	December 25, 2010

=== Season 4 (2011) ===
No. overall	No. in season	Title	Original release date
40	1	"Big Toys and Small Packages"	October 2, 2011
41	2	"It's All About the Chase"	October 2, 2011
42	3	"Here Comes the Judge"	October 4, 2011
43	4	"356 Porsh-Ahhh"	October 11, 2011
44	5	"A King in Queens"	October 25, 2011
45	6	"Double VW"	November 1, 2011
46	7	"The Anti Chrysler"	November 8, 2011
47	8	"Kuwait"	November 15, 2011
48	9	"Hot Rod o' Rama"	November 22, 2011
49	10	"Buffalo Collection"	November 29, 2011
50	11	"What Comes Around Goes Around"	December 6, 2011
51	12	"Rolls vs. Rolls"	December 13, 2011
52	13	"Bigger In Texas"	December 20, 2011

=== Season 5 (2012–13) ===
No. overall	No. in season	Title	Original release date
53	1	"Hershey"	April 3, 2012
54	2	"Boyd Coddington Cars"	April 3, 2012
55	3	"Gullwing and Lusso"	April 10, 2012
56	4	"Hartung: Motorcycles"	April 17, 2012
57	5	"Hartung: Cars"	April 24, 2012
58	6	"Scottsdale: 1939 Canoe Woodie"	May 1, 2012
59	7	"Kissimmee: Cars"	May 8, 2012
60	8	"Kissimmee: Trucks Are Hot"	May 15, 2012
61	9	"Amelia Island: Ponies"	May 22, 2012
62	10	"Amelia Island: Get Some, Give Some"	May 29, 2012
63	11	"275s"	June 5, 2012
64	12	"Steve Moal"	June 12, 2012
65	13	"A Gift for Roger"	June 19, 2012
66	14	"California Dreaming"	October 16, 2012
67	15	"Wheels Through Time"	October 16, 2012
68	16	"Wayne's Apprentice"	October 23, 2012
69	17	"Buy. Sell? Hold?"	October 30, 2012
70	18	"You Don't See THAT Everyday"	November 13, 2012
71	19	"The Curve Ball"	November 20, 2012
72	20	"Still Racy"	November 27, 2012
73	21	"Horse Trading"	December 4, 2012
74	22	"2x The Fun"	December 11, 2012
75	23	"Need for Speed"	December 18, 2012
76	24	"Hidden Treasures"	January 8, 2013
77	25	"Kings of the Road"	January 15, 2013
78	26	"Happy Birthday!"	January 22, 2013

=== Season 6 (2013–14) ===
No. overall	No. in season	Title	Original release date
79	1	"Amelia Island"	May 7, 2013
80	2	"Hudson Hornet"	May 7, 2013
81	3	"Micro Cars"	May 14, 2013
82	4	"Packards"	May 21, 2013
83	5	"Utah Collection"	May 28, 2013
84	6	"275 Ferrari"	June 11, 2013
85	7	"Where Are They Now?"	June 18, 2013
86	8	"Chase, Buy, Repeat!"	August 27, 2013
87	9	"Barn Find or Bust?"	August 27, 2013
88	10	"Green is the New Black"	September 3, 2013
89	11	"Wet, Wild & Willys!"	September 10, 2013
90	12	"Overheating in Oregon"	September 17, 2013
91	13	"A Mysterious Find"	September 24, 2013
92	14	"What Wayne Wants"	October 1, 2013
93	15	"Red Hot and Rowdy"	October 8, 2013
94	16	"Chance of a Lifetime"	October 15, 2013
95	17	"Invitation Only"	October 22, 2013
96	18	"Cannonball's Run"	October 29, 2013
97	19	"Back to the Beach"	November 5, 2013
98	20	"Backyard Finds"	November 12, 2013
99	21	"Wayne Meets Triplets"	November 19, 2013
100	22	"Wayne Goes Skiing"	February 4, 2014
101	23	"Big Brass"	February 11, 2014
102	24	"Kiss a Few Frogs"	February 18, 2014
103	25	"Getting Hot"	February 25, 2014
104	26	"The Power of Three"	March 4, 2014

=== Season 7 (2014) ===
No. overall	No. in season	Title	Original release date
105	1	"Wayne's Amelia Island Trip"	July 28, 2014
106	2	"Wayne's Top 10"	July 28, 2014
107	3	"Keels & Wheels"	September 16, 2014
108	4	"A Lawnmower Has More Horsepower!"	September 16, 2014
109	5	"F Is For Ferrari"	September 23, 2014
110	6	"American All Stars"	September 30, 2014
111	7	"Hunting For Healey"	October 7, 2014
112	8	"Phoenix Rising"	October 14, 2014
113	9	"Two Wheelin' It"	October 21, 2013
114	10	"Size Doesn't Matter"	November 4, 2014
115	11	"Are You the Great Gatsby?"	November 11, 2014
116	12	"Running Down a Dream"	November 18, 2014
117	13	"Stars & Their Cars"	November 25, 2014
118	14	"Mama Mia!"	December 2, 2014
119	15	"Two Wheelin' It"	December 9, 2014
120	16	"The Three Bills"	December 16, 2014

=== Season 8 (2015) ===
No. overall	No. in season	Title	Original release date
121	1	"London or Bust!"	May 5, 2015
122	2	"Vegas Gold!"	May 19, 2015
123	3	"Studebaker Time Machine"	May 26, 2015
124	4	"Million Dollar Find"	June 2, 2015
125	5	"Here Kitty, Kitty"	June 9, 2015
126	6	"Jersey Style!"	June 16, 2015
127	7	"Auburns Have More Fun"	June 23, 2015
128	8	"Ultra Rare Rides"	June 30, 2015
129	9	"Island Time!"	July 7, 2015
130	10	"Just a Little Patience"	July 14, 2015
131	11	TBA	July 21, 2015

=== Season 9 (2015-2016) ===
No. overall	No. in season	Title	Original release date
132	1	"Hey There, Hot Stutz"	November 2, 2015
133	2	"Whip It Good"	November 2, 2015
134	3	"Beetle Mania"	November 10, 2015
135	4	"Going Topless"	November 17, 2015
136	5	"Dats Loco"	November 24, 2015
137	6	"Big Brass Ones"	December 8, 2015
138	7	"The Foot Long"	December 15, 2015
139	8	"Highway to Hellcat"	December 22, 2015
140	9	"Ramblin' Man"	December 29, 2015
141	10	"It's All About the Race"	January 5, 2016
142	11	"Driving Miss Joplin"	January 12, 2016

=== Season 10 (2016) ===
No. overall	No. in season	Title	Original release date
143	1	"It's a Size Joke"	May 31, 2016
144	2	"American Shopper"	May 31, 2016
145	3	"A Collectors Collection"	June 7, 2016
146	4	"Diamond in the Rough"	June 14, 2016
147	5	"Little Racers. Big Dollars"	June 21, 2016
148	6	"This Porsche Is Shot"	June 28, 2016
149	7	"Rain Man Buick"	July 5, 2016
150	8	"Along Came A Spider"	July 12, 2016
151	9	"A 40 Year Secret Shelby GT"	July 19, 2016
152	10	"King of the Hill"	July 26, 2016
153	11	"American Muscle"	August 2, 2016
154	12	"Hot Wheels"	August 23, 2016
155	13	"The Search for My Dad's Car"	August 30, 2016

=== Season 11 (2017) ===
No. overall	No. in season	Title	Original release date
156	1	"Road to Minerva(na)"	March 15, 2017
157	2	"A-List B Cars"	March 22, 2017
158	3	"Bearcat Boys & Porsche Toys"	March 29, 2017
159	4	"Every Ferrari Has a SAAB Story"	April 5, 2017
160	5	"Ford GT40 vs. Ferrari Take Two"	April 12, 2017
161	6	"Stellar Stangeullini, Boss Bandini"	April 19, 2017
162	7	"Wayne's Good Karma(ann) Ghias"	April 26, 2017
163	8	"Two Times the Barn Finds"	May 3, 2017
164	9	"ReVere's Wild Ride"	May 10, 2017

=== Season 12 (2017) ===
No. overall	No. in season	Title	Original release date
165	1	"Speedsters Race for Pink Slips"	August 15, 2017
166	2	"Restoring a Stutz Special"	August 15, 2017
167	3	"No Choke, No Smoke"	August 22, 2017
168	4	"You Can Hear the Supercharger!"	August 29, 2017
169	5	"FDR's Daily Driver"	September 5, 2017
170	6	"Motorcycles & a Lambo: That's What's for Dinner"	September 12, 2017
171	7	"Burning for a Boattail & a 944 Porsche"	September 19, 2017
172	8	"Two Racecars & a Truck to Tow Them"	September 26, 2017
173	9	"SuperMopar! EPA Superbird & a Superbee"	November 2, 2017
174	10	"3 Abarths & a Kaiser"	November 2, 2017

=== Season 13 (2018) ===
No. overall	No. in season	Title	Original release date
175	1	"Porsche 4Cam vs. Steve Jobs' BMW Z8"	June 26, 2018
176	2	"Racing Record Monza, Bucking Bronco, & Vincent Motos"	July 3, 2018
177	3	"Chevy Surprise & Lucky Lamborghini"	July 10, 2018
178	4	"100 Year Old Harley"	July 17, 2018
179	5	"Coupe! (There It Is)"	July 24, 2018
180	6	"Ford GT40 & a Flying Banana"	July 31, 2018

=== Season 14 (2019) ===
No. overall	No. in season	Title	Original release date
181	1	"Commander in Chief"	March 20, 2019
182	2	"Wheels & Deals"	March 27, 2019
183	3	"XKE Marks the Spot"	April 3, 2019
184	4	"Hurray for Jollywood!"	April 10, 2019

=== Season 15 (2020) ===
No. overall	No. in season	Title	Original release date
185	1	"One Car Wonder"	February 6, 2020
186	2	"Wayne's Gotta Wait"	February 13, 2020
187	3	"No Replacement for Displacement"	February 20, 2020
188	4	"(AC) Ace in the Hole"	February 27, 2020
189	5	"3 Million Mile Volvo"	March 5, 2020
190	6	"Shouldn't Be Selling It"	March 12, 2020
191	7	"10 Million Dollar Fixer Upper"	March 19, 2020
192	8	"Twist and Scout"	March 26, 2020
193	9	"Let the Good Times Roll"	April 2, 2020
194	10	"Eclectic Avenue"	April 9, 2020

=== Season 16 (2020) ===
No. overall	No. in season	Title	Original release date
195	1	"A Griffith Resurrection"	October 20, 2020
196	2	"Hasta La Bristol, Baby!"	October 27, 2020
197	3	"The Collection Has Left the Building"	November 3, 2020
198	4	"Fly Like an Elgin"	November 10, 2020
199	5	"Great Godsal!"	November 17, 2020

=== Season 17 (2021) ===
No. overall	No. in season	Title	Original release date
200	1	"A Jag, A Baker, A Memory Maker!"	July 21, 2021
201	2	"AbraCARdabra!"	July 28, 2021
202	3	"Live By The Ford, Buy By The Ford!"	August 4, 2021
203	4	"Revved Up Like A Deuce"	August 11, 2021
204	5	"Back To The Futura"	August 18, 2021
