= Amédée Bollée =

French bellfounder and inventor (1844-1917)

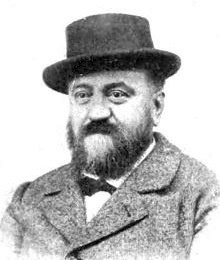
Amédée Bollée

Amédée-Ernest Bollée (11 January 1844 – 20 January 1917) was a French bellfounder and inventor who manufactured steam road vehicles. Between 1873 and 1885 he pioneered fully-independent suspension and the front-mounted engine driving the rear wheels; this layout was adopted by car manufacturers in the 1890s and used on most cars until the 1960s.

After 1867 he was known as "Amédée père" to distinguish him from his eldest son, Amédée-Ernest-Marie Bollée (1867–1926).

== Biography ==
Bell by Bollée father and son, Abbey of Saint-Pierre-sur-Dives, Normandy, 2012

Bollée was the eldest son of Ernest-Sylvain Bollée, a bellfounder and inventor who settled (Note: Until the mid-nineteenth century, bellfounders in France were itinerant, casting the bells near where they were to be used, Better transport made it possible to establish a foundry in a location and supply bells by rail and road.) in Le Mans in 1842. He became seriously ill in the early 1860s and was obliged to delegate the day-to-day running of his businesses to his three sons. Amédée-Ernest was given charge of the bell foundry, while Ernest-Jules (1846–1922) supervised the hydraulic ram business and the youngest son, Auguste-Sylvain Bollée (1847–1906) assumed control of the Éolienne Bollée wind-turbine factory. Ernest-Sylvain retained ownership, only passing the businesses to his sons in 1884. (Note: This came after complaints in 1883 from Ernest-Jules about their father's bailing out Amédée's business after the collapse of Wöhlert and Le Cordiner: Amédée had spent the royalties which they owed him.) Thereafter, Amédée concentrated on the bells, which along with Ernest-Sylvain's other businesses, had subsidised his vehicles.

== Steam vehicles ==
=== L'Obéissante ===
L'Obéissante showing one of the V-twin engines. Photograph before 1875, when the roof was added

L'Obéissante at Musée des Arts et Métiers-Cnam, Paris, 2017

Interior of L'Obéissante, 2013

Bollée completed his first steam vehicle, the omnibus L'Obéissante (The Obedient) towards the end of 1873. It weighed 4.8 tonnes and carried 12 passengers on two bench seats down the sides (approx. 375 mm per passenger (Note: Estimated from the side view showing the engine. The top of the engineer's cap is assumed to be 900mm above the seat. The passenger seat lies between his back and the front of the vehicle.)). Aware of its excellent reputation in Paris fire engines, Bollée used a Field boiler. Instead of a differential, it had two V-twin engines, one on each side between the front and back wheels. Each of these drove the adjacent rear wheel by chain drive (see early photograph without roof). Together the engines were rated at 15 hp (Note: The power of a steam engine comes from the pressure of the steam in its boiler. This is built up over time and maintained by adding fuel and stoking the fire. The driver controls a valve which regulates the flow of steam to the engine. The figure of 15 hp here is most likely that which the engines can deliver for an extended period. When necessary, e.g. climbing a hill, the driver can open the valve completely, whereupon the power may triple or more. It will then fall as the pressure in the boiler drops because more steam is being consumed than new steam is being generated. It is rarely clear on what basis the power rating of a steam engine has been quoted.), giving it an average speed of 12 mph over long distances. It had a gearbox, could climb 1:8 hills with ease and reach 25 mph for short distances on level roads. It consumed 4.5 kg of coal/coke and 20 l of water per km.

The vehicle used double-pivot steering which was "geometrically exact", as with the Ackermann linkage, but greater steering angles were possible. (Note: Greater steering angles were possible because the steered wheels were pivoted as on a bicycle. "Geometrically exact" means that each steered wheel remained tangent to the path traced by its contact with the ground. This was achieved using chains round elliptical sprockets for each steered wheel; see https://web.archive.org/web/20170805182405im_/http://gazoline.net/IMG/jpg/doc-1363.jpg) Along with other controls to hand at the steering wheel, the driver had two pedals, which controlled the flow of steam to the engines. (Note: What he appears not to have been able to control were the brakes on the rear wheels. At the left of the photo of the interior there is a second wheel, smaller than the steering wheel (better seen on this photo). This is absent from the early photo without the roof. On La Mancelle there is a second, smaller wheel with a handle above the steering wheel. In his sectional drawing of it, William Worby Beaumont identifies this as the brake and shows how it worked. Its similarity to the secondary wheel on L'Obéissante and its evident importance – it is supported by a brace fixed to the door in front of it, which has been sealed – lends weight to this identification. So does the method by which the brake operated on La Mancelle: its spindle lay inside a tubular spindle for the steering wheel, something which would have been hard to retrofit. As it is unlikely that Bollée overlooked the need for a control which applied the brake, the explanation may lie in the force which needed to be applied and for how long: a wheel with a handle suggests a screw mechanism (sounds right for a 5-ton vehicle). Worby Beaumont confirms this was used on La Mancelle.) These controls contributed to its exceptional manoeuverability, which gave L'Obéissante its nickname, The Obedient. For the first time, the steered wheels of a vehicle had independent suspension, which was by sliding pillar. When it was demonstrated in Paris in 1875, it did not disturb horses by its noise or its appearance. (Note: British experience with steam road vehicles had led to the conclusion that horses were spooked by rapidly moving equipment, e.g. governors or pistons, and by objects which they were not used to seeing, e.g. a chimney on a vehicle. Bollée's design of L'Obéissante avoided both of these; see Frederick Bramwell at pp 83-84 of John Head: "On the Rise and Progress of Steam Locomotion on Common Roads", Minutes of the Proceedings of the ICE, 1872-73, pp 36-102)

Amédée Bollée jr driving L'Obéissante at Le Mans, 1923

Bollée received authorisation to run L'Obéissante in the Sarthe département, and did so with family and friends. In 1875 he was invited to come and demonstrate it in Paris and received authorisation to do so (motorised vehicles were banned from the roads) from Eugène Caillaux, the Minister of Public Works. He went in October 1875, covering the distance of 230 km in 18 hours, including time to take on water and for meal breaks.

Despite its positive reception, Bollée received no orders for it. (Note: Its economics were poor: the cabin was no larger than that on a 2-horse omnibus, which at that date usually also carried passengers on "knifeboard" seats on the upper-deck. It weighed 5 tonnes against less than 1 for a horse-bus and required an engineer and a stoker as well as the driver.) He was, however, asked by A.Dalifol, proprietor of a Parisian foundry to collaborate in building a large steam tram for Paris. This is discussed in the next section.

In 1923, during its inaugural year, Bollée's son, Amédée jr, drove the 50-year-old L'Obéissante at the Circuit de la Sarthe track at Le Mans. The original vehicle is preserved in the collection of the Conservatoire National des Arts et Métiers in Paris.

=== Bollée-Dalifol steam tram ===
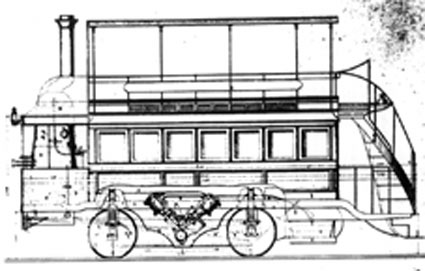
1876 Paris tram designed by Bollée and built by Dalifol

Merryweather & Sons tram engine hauling a double-decker tram on Compagnie des tramways Sud, Paris, late 1870s

In the mid-1870s, Parisian omnibus companies considered several methods to mechanise their horse-drawn trams. They wanted something clean, quiet and economical. The first to run, on 8 November 1875, was a Merryweather & Sons tram engine hauling a double-decker tram on the Compagnie des tramways Sud line between porte de Châtillon and Saint-Germain-des-Prés. Other contenders included the Mekarski system (compressed air) and the Lamm & Francq system (stored superheated steam). (Note: See Traction mécanique, https://fr.wikipedia.org/wiki/Ancien_tramway_d'%C3%8Ele-de-France#Traction_m%C3%A9canique)

This was the market Dalifol sought to address. He engaged Bollée for the boiler and moving parts of a 50-passenger double-decker tram. This would be based on L'Obéissante, but with the boiler at the front, which would be fed automatically. All four wheels were driven and independently suspended. On L'Obéissante each V-twin engine drove the rear wheel on that side, facilitating going round curves.

Souvestre reports, however, that all four wheels were steered and that it could come off the tracks to steer round an obstacle. He also says that the transmission system used transverse driveshafts with universal joints and that each wheel assembly had telescopic suspension. This differs from L'Obéissante in driving both wheels on each side, using universal joints and using telescopic suspension rather than elliptic springs.

Souvestre says that the tramcar worked well, but was too heavy for the rails of the tramway and frightened horses. (Note: See note [f] about British experience with spooking horses. Bollée's design of L'Obéissante avoided the traps, but Dalifol's placing of the boiler with a chimney at the front did not. Dalifol's economics were better than for L'Obéissante but not good. The steam tram's weight would have been several times that of a non-powered tram of the same capacity. Having a separate engine (whether pulling or pushing) and a separate tender reduced axle loads.) It did not enter permanent service.

=== La Mancelle ===
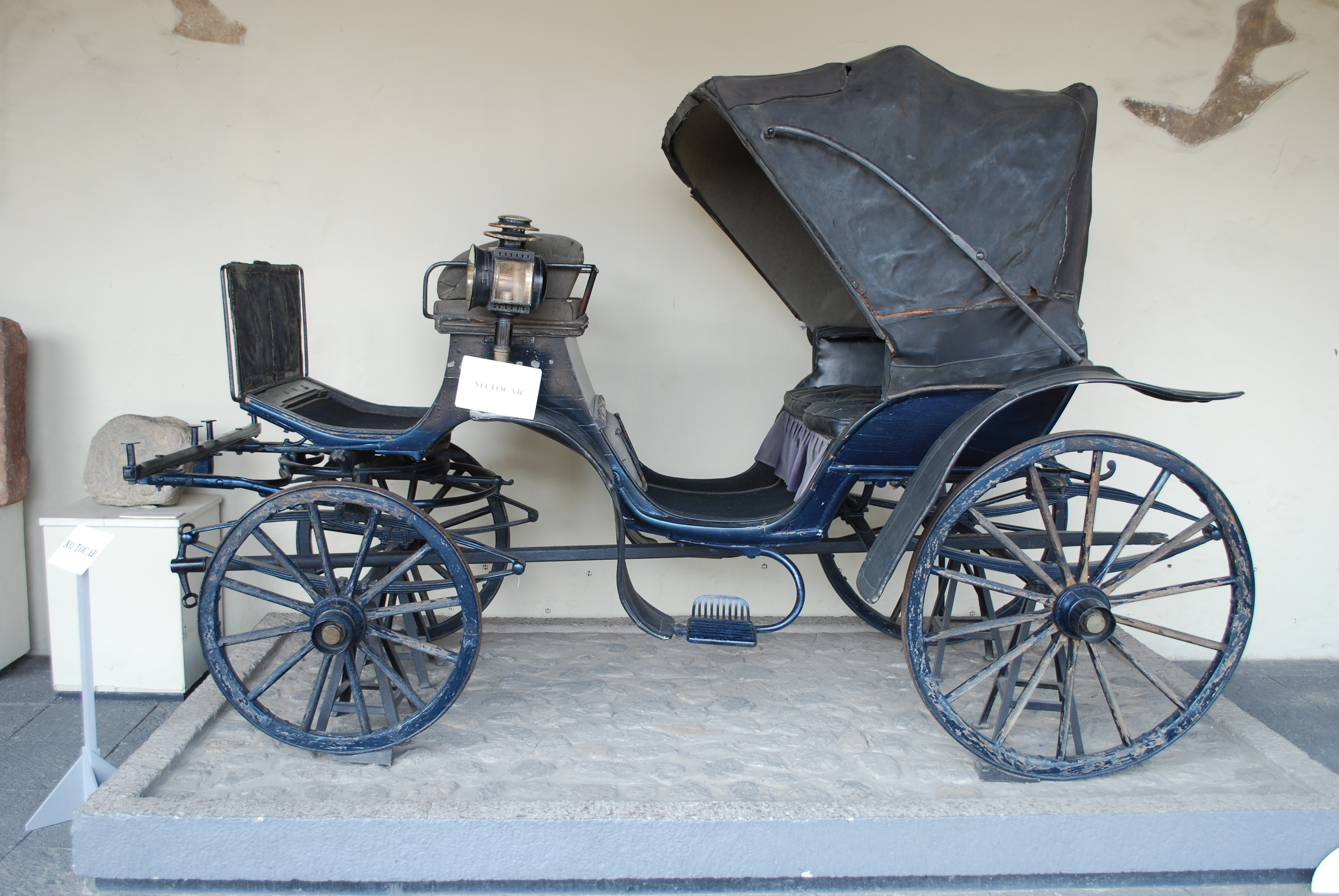
A Victoria carriage in the Palace of Cortés, Mexico. The occasional seat facing the main one is folded down.

First version (single-cylinder) of Bollée's La Mancelle, 1878

Two-cylinder La Mancelle with metal wheels at Rétromobile, Paris, 2016

After his lack of commercial success with L'Obéissante and the steam tram, Bollée came to the conclusion that his vehicles had been too heavy and that he needed to produce a lighter vehicle.

For the 1878 World Fair in Paris he produced La Mancelle, a steam-powered Victoria, a popular type of carriage which has a principal seat for three with a folding hood and a box in front for the coachman and footman. It also had a lesser rear-facing seat on the back of the box facing the main seat.

The engine of the first La Mancelle had a single vertical cylinder at the front with a flywheel and consumed 2 kg of coal/coke per km.

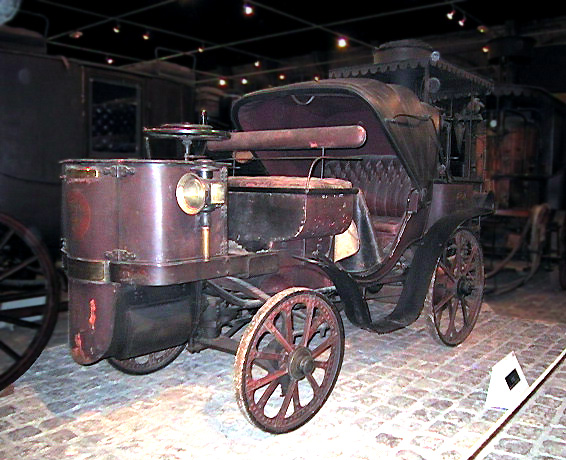
Front of La Mancelle, Compiègne, 2006

The La Mancelle we see today has a two-cylinder steam engine at the front, a larger box and strongly-braced metal wheels; at the back is a larger boiler. It weighs 2¾ tonnes. The engine's cylinders are vertical and in-line; the crankshaft / driveshaft runs front-to-back to bevel gears and a differential beneath the main seat. From each side of this there is a half-shaft, with chain drive to the rear wheels. (Note: This arrangement (apart from the driveshaft and differential), echoes that of Walter Hancock's steam omnibuses and car of the 1830s with their vertical cylinders and chain drive; see the cross-section of his steam car) The mechanism is shown in this plan and elevation.

Side view and section of Bollée's steam coach of 1881

Another form which La Mancelle could take was an enclosed steam coach. The main difference from the example at Compiègne is the bodywork. (Note: Another difference is that the box doesn't overhang the front wheels.) When the Marquis de Broc commissioned his steam coach of 1885, the Bollées built the chassis and running gear while Mühlbacher of Paris built the bodywork.

The layout of La Mancelle was to prove the foundation of the motor industry: it was adopted in 1891 by Émile Levassor of Panhard et Levassor and is known as the Système Panhard. With the coming of pneumatic tyres, the final transmission by chains was dropped and the differential placed in the middle of the rear axle.

Independent front suspension on Bollée's La Mancelle of 1878

Dependent front suspension on Benz Velo of 1899: note the rigid axle

The steering and suspension were new. The steering was a form of Ackermann linkage while the suspension, fully independent as with L'Obéissante and the steam tram, used steering pivots between the ends of two centrally-mounted transverse leaf springs one above the other. This suspension anticipated Dubonnet's independent front suspension by more than 50 years.

At the 1878 World Fair the first version of La Mancelle won a gold medal and Bollée received his first order, from Isaac Koechlin, an industrialist from Thann in Alsace. His vehicle was delivered on 6 May 1879, for which he paid 12,000 francs. It was still running in 1907.

A French entrepreneur, Léon Le Cordier, established a company with a capital of 460,000 francs to exploit Bollée's patents in European markets other than France and the UK. He obtained permission to demonstrate La Mancelle in Vienna.The ensuing demonstration before Emperor Franz-Joseph attracted a huge crowd and led to the establishment of an Austrian company to exploit Bollée's patents. However, the only products it manufactured were toy replicas of La Mancelle.

Passenger-carrying road locomotive by Lotz of Nantes, 1865

Meanwhile, during 1879, Bollée had built the road locomotive La Marie-Anne (see next section). This had attracted enormous interest throughout the 17 days which it took him to drive it from Le Mans to the Ariège, where it was to be used. Full of hope for the future, Bollée now built a new factory for his vehicle division next to the bell foundry; it had been completed by February 1880. Its principal product was a more powerful version of La Mancelle which La Compagnie des Eaux de Lacaune commissioned to provide an "omnibus service" (Note: "Omnibus" as an adjective means "open to all". "Omnibus" as a noun refers to a vehicle used for such a transport service, specifically one with a single aisle with passengers sitting on each side facing each other. The noun can be used adjectivally.) between Castres and Lacaune. In the 1860s, steam-powered road trains came into use in areas which railways had yet to reach. Typically a road locomotive hauled passenger coaches and wagons for freight, but there were also small passenger-carrying road locomotives which served smaller communities. Lacaune has a population today of 2500.

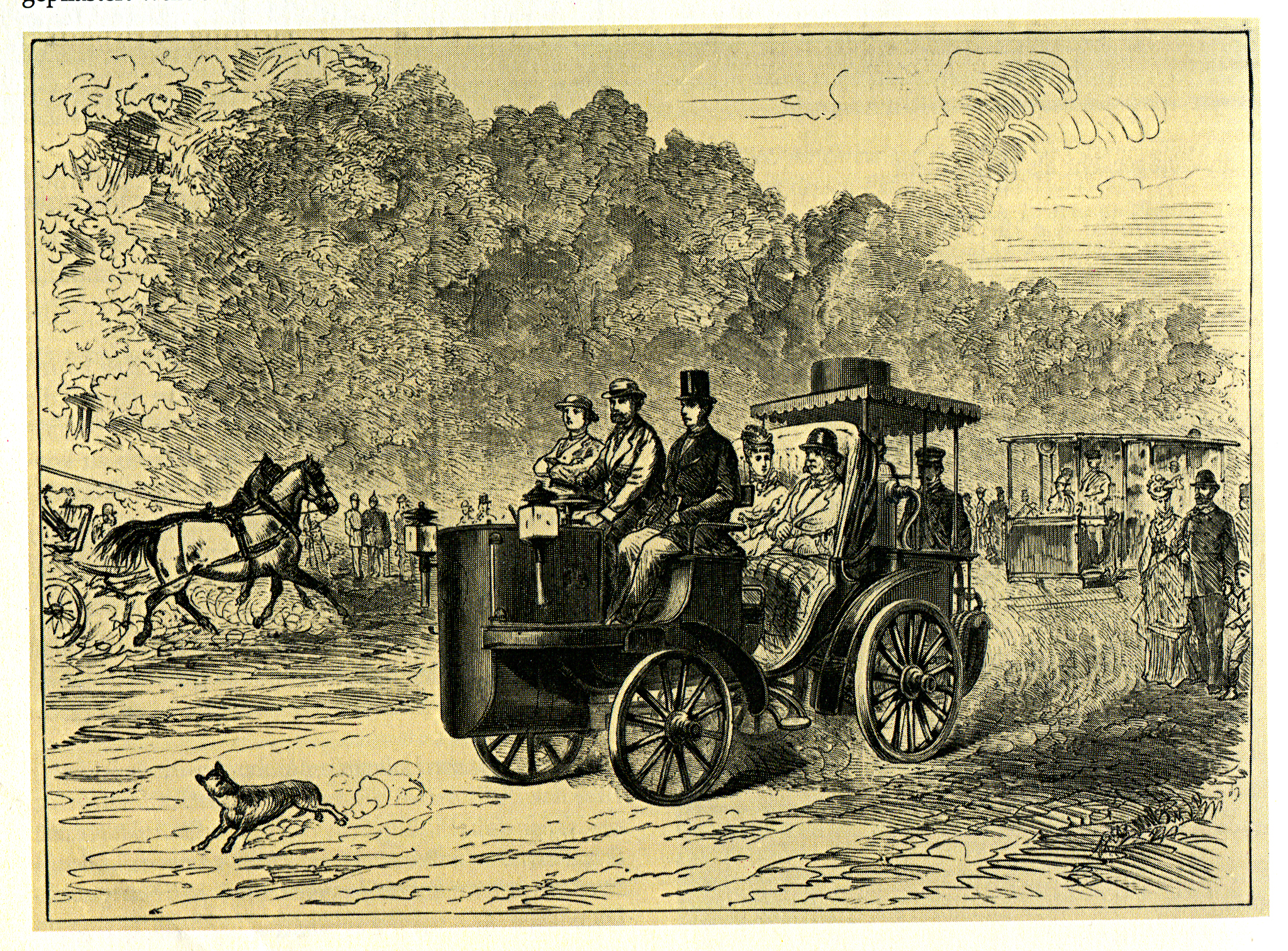
"A Steam Omnibus in Charlottenburg", Berlin, from a contemporary newspaper, 1880

Le Cordier next tried Prussia, where he established a relationship with the banker Barthold Arons. In August 1880 Le Cordier demonstrated La Mancelle in Berlin. This led to the licensing of the design to the German railway manufacturer Wöhlert and the establishment of a joint venture between Le Cordier and Wöhlert to run a "steam omnibus" service there. The contemporary newspaper illustration shows it in use. Wöhlert manufactured 16 (or 22) La Mancelle vehicles in Berlin between 1880 and 1881, but the joint venture foundered and Wöhlert was declared bankrupt in 1883. (Note: Main source: https://de.wikipedia.org/wiki/F._W%C3%B6hlert%E2%80%99sche_Maschinenbau-Anstalt_und_Eisengiesserei#W%C3%B6hlert-Boll%C3%A9e_Dampfdroschke. Eric Favre (in Gazoline.net) says that the collapse was prompted by the damage which the vehicles caused to the roads and inadequate maintenance of them.) Bollée never received a sou.

Altogether about 50 examples of La Mancelle were made.

In 1927 Bollée's widow gave to the Musée national de la Voiture the example which is now at the Château de Compiègne. Photographs of it, including one from c.1900 can be seen here.

=== La Marie-Anne ===
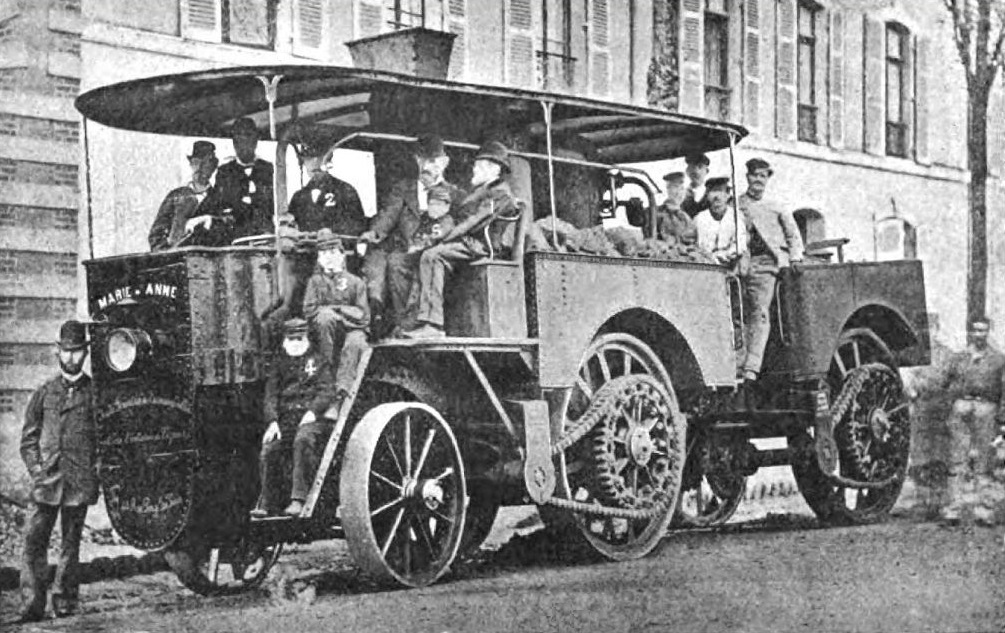
Bollée family (Note: Léon (4) is at the bottom of the steps leading to the platform. Behind him is Amédée fils (3). Immediately above Amédée fils is his father Amédée père (2), at the wheel. Camille (5) is on the lap of his grandfather Ernest-Sylvain (1) at the right. Numbers are in white on each person.) on La Marie-Anne, 1879

Side view of La Marie-Anne, 1879

In 1879 Bollée built his largest vehicle, a road locomotive intended to haul heavy loads on secondary roads and private tracks in the Ariège. It was commissioned by the Société Métallurgique de l'Ariège, which ran an ironworks and foundry in Pamiers. In 1869 it had opened a blast furnace in Tarascon-sur-Ariège, 15 km from the Rancié iron ore mines in the Vicdessos valley and 50 km from the Pimorent mine west of Porté-Puymorens. (Note: Sources: the French Wikipedia articles about the company, the railway and the mines, which are hyperlinked.)

Bollée sought to suit his vehicle to its task by splitting it into two parts, each with driven wheels. Usually the tender on road locomotives was unpowered and hauled as with other wagons. Bollée took the drive to his tender through a universal joint. The locomotive proper was 5.5m long with the working platform 1.6m from the ground and the canopy 1.7m above this; with the tender it was 8.8m long. (Note: All dimensions taken from the side view.) The aggregate weight was 20 tons unladen, 28 tons ready for the road. Developing 100 hp (101 PS; 75 kW), La Marie-Anne had a three speed gearbox and could tow 35 tons on a 6% slope. One reported issue: it was so noisy that the driver at the front had to use an acoustic tube to communicate with the engineer at the back.

Before its delivery to the Ariège it was tested in Le Mans over three days by the War Ministry, mostly to establish its utility for hauling artillery pieces. On the first day it hauled 20 tons up a 6 per cent gradient in bottom gear at 2 - 3 mph, then on reaching level ground and engaging second gear, went at 4 mph. On later days it reached 6 mph on level ground with a similar load. Compared against other haulage units, its four driven wheels and effective suspension gave it greater tractive power, while its lower water consumption and large tanks allowed it to go much further between refills.

Bollée drove La Marie-Anne the 450 miles to Ax-les-Thermes over a period of 17 days (27 miles/day). Driving time was 74 hours (average speed 6 mph including stops; 9 mph excluding them). It attracted great interest along the way, both from local dignitaries and the general population.

Bollée later built a second road locomotive, L'Elisabeth, which Le Cordier demonstrated in Berlin in August 1880, along with La Mancelle. Although the French War Ministry had decided against buying any road locomotives from Bollée, the French public took umbrage at the sale of French technology with military potential to the enemy of the recent war. To this pressure was later added the collapse of Wöhlert in 1882 and the ensuing bailout by his father, against which his brother Ernest protested. Amédée withdrew from the vehicle business, handing the reins to his eldest son, Amédée fils.

=== La Nouvelle ===
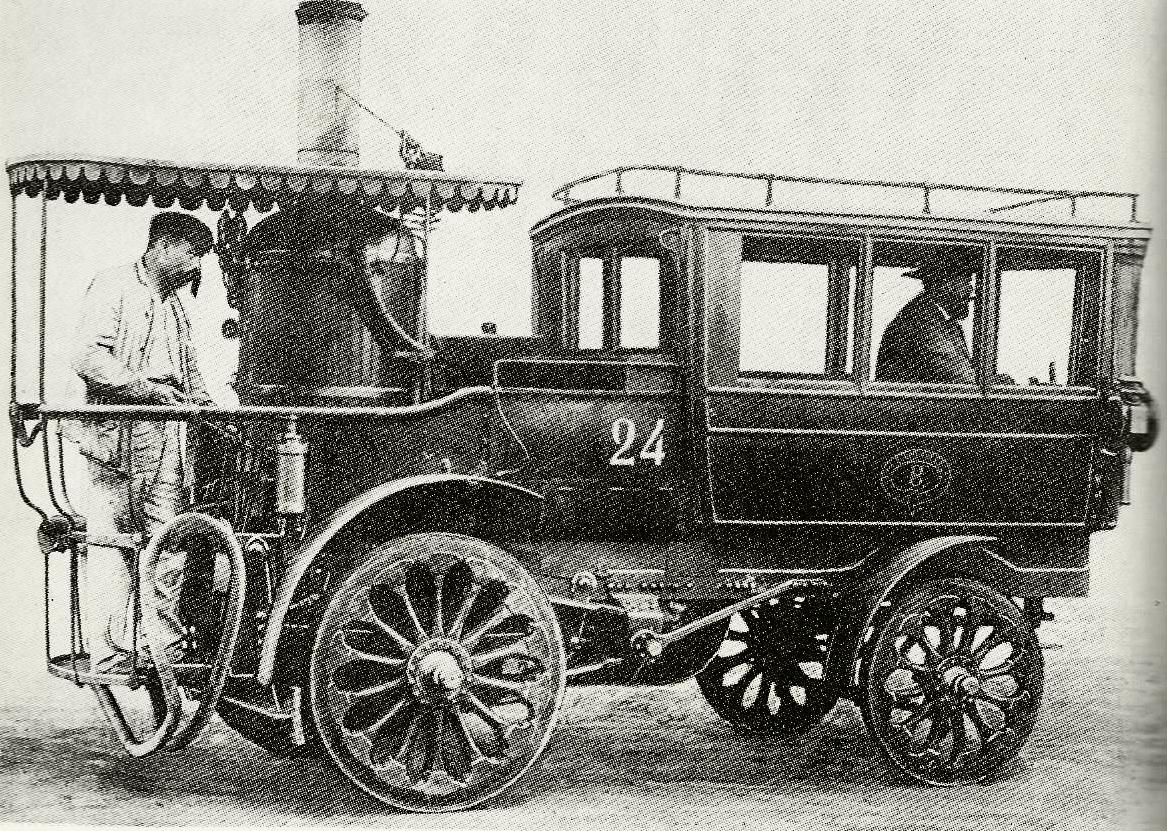
La Nouvelle steam brake of 1880, photographed in 1895 (it was number 24 in the Paris – Bordeaux – Paris race)

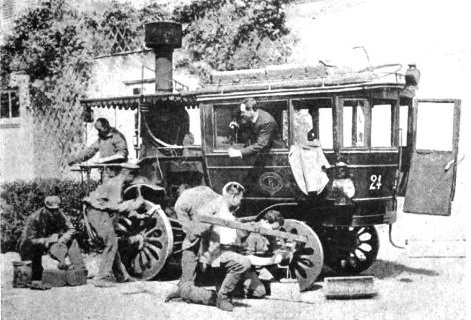
La Nouvelle on its return from the Paris – Bordeaux – Paris race, 1895

Bollée's next vehicle, completed in 1880, was La Nouvelle, a steam brake. It was commissioned by his father (Note: Eric Favre says that the commission was to stave off bankruptcy; around this time, Bollée spent heavily building a new factory, anticipating receiving royalties from sales in Germany and Austria.) and was his first with a fully-enclosed passenger compartment. All the machinery – boiler and engine – were at the back, the cylinders being horizontal.

Technical details are:

- Field boiler — Outer diameter: 0.70 m. Number of tubes: 118. Heating surface: 5.65 m². Grate area: 0.36 m². Water volume (at normal level): 73 litres. Steam superheater surface: 1.02 m². Average superheated steam temperature: 300°C. Working pressure: 10 bar.
- Two-cylinder horizontal engine — Cylinder bore: 100 mm. Piston stroke: 160 mm.
- Vehicle — Track gauge: 1.520 m. Wheelbase: 2.180 m. Diameter of rear wheels: 1.040 m; front wheels: 0.830 m. Unladen weight: 3,200 kg. Fuel capacity: 300 kg. Water capacity (in tank): 460 litres. Seating capacity (including the driver): 8. Average speed: 28 km/h. Maximum observed speed: 45 km/h. Average consumption per kilometer: 10 litres of water and 1.8 kg of fuel. Average power: 10 hp. Maximum power observed when climbing gradients: 30 hp. Time required to build up pressure: 20 minutes.

Suspension was an improved version of La Mancelle's, i.e. independent all round with transverse leaf-springs at the front and trailing-arm at the back.

It took part in the 1895 Paris – Bordeaux – Paris race, in which it was the last of nine vehicles (out of thirty which started) to complete the course. The other eight steam cars failed to finish, their drivers pushing them beyond their limits. A rag left behind on a bearing caused a gear on La Nouvelle to break, the repairs to which took many hours. Despite this, the car managed several fastest times between checkpoints.

=== La Rapide ===
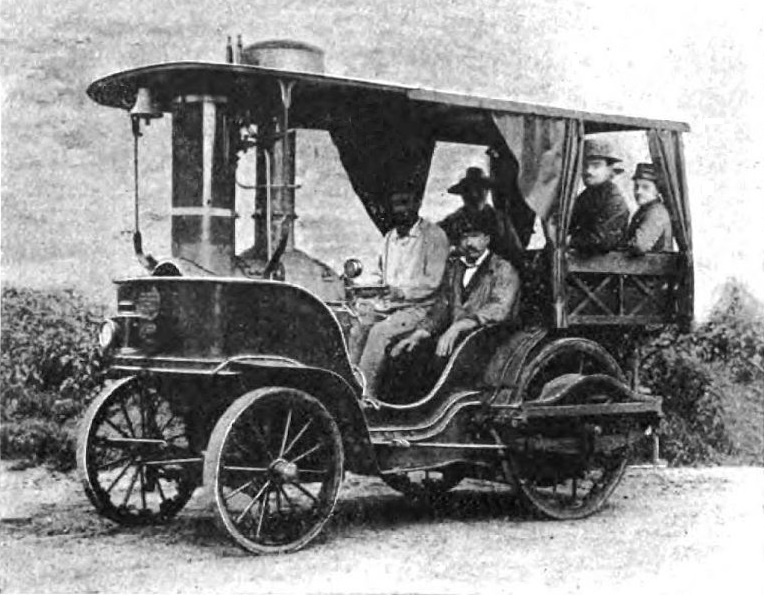
La Rapide in 1881

La Rapide (The Rapid) was built in 1881 and represented a move away from Bollée's practice of robustly-engineered (i.e. heavy) vehicles with Field boilers (Note: The nature of the boiler in La Rapide is not recorded, but its appearance differs from those in Bollée's other vehicles, which are vertical cylinders with a wooden jacket. His use of Field boilers is noted by Duncan for L'Obéissante, by Souvestre for La Nouvelle and by Kesseler generally in his article about Bollée's vehicles in The Engineer of 10 June 1881.). The first example was made for Amédée's youngest brother Auguste. Its unladen weight was 1 ton and it had direct drive to the rear wheels. i.e. the differential was in the middle of the rear axle instead of having a counter-shaft with chains to the rear wheels. While it could achieve 34 mph on a good, level road, in the absence of pneumatic tyres, it shook the passengers and destroyed itself and the road.

At the front, the photograph suggests that Bollée used the same transverse leaf-spring independent suspension which he had been using since La Mancelle. Souvestre attributes to Bollée the first use of transverse universal joints on steered and driven wheels. As the photograph of La Rapide shows leaf-spring and possibly sliding-pillar suspension on the visible rear wheel, the implication is that, as with Bollée's previous vehicles, the rear wheels also had independent suspension (Note: Bollée does not use fully-elliptic springs at the rear. The lower half is a leaf-spring but the upper half appears to be rigid, as if to serve as the fixing for a sliding pillar.). That is incompatible with a simple rigid axle but is possible with the use of universal joints at each end of the half-axle between the differential and the wheel. This is similar to De Dion suspension but (if there were sliding pillars at the wheels), fully independent.

Eric Favre says that there were some imperfections in the first La Rapide built, but that these were fixed in the two further examples which were built. It is possible that Souvestre reported what happened with the first vehicle and that Bollée was able to tune the suspension to reduce the shaking. Fifteen years later, the Michelin brothers provided a much better solution.

Another innovation in La Rapide was having the boiler at the front. There doesn't seem space for the engine at the front, so it probably followed La Nouvelle in having the engine with horizontal cylinders at the back. Forward visibility was impeded by the chimney and a stoker was still needed. Smoke from the chimney could drift down into the open passenger compartment.

=== The steam coach of the Marquis de Broc ===
This is Thibaut (1852-1912), not the historian Hervé (1848-1916), who succeeded him as Marquis.

Steam coach of 1885 for the Marquis de Broc at Rétromobile, 2016

Rear platform of the Marquis de Broc's steam coach

== See also ==
- History of steam road vehicles
