= Mosquito Squadron =

1969 British war film directed by Boris Sagal

- Theatrical release quad crown display poster
- Directed by: Boris Sagal
- Written by: Donald S. Sanford; Joyce Perry
- Starring: David McCallum; Suzanne Neve; Charles Gray
- Cinematography: Paul Beeson
- Music by: Frank Cordell
- Production company: Oakmont Productions
- Distributed by: United Artists
- Release date: January 1969
- Running time: 86 minutes
- Country: United Kingdom
- Language: English

Mosquito Squadron is a 1969 British war film made by Oakmont Productions, directed by Boris Sagal and starring David McCallum. The raid echoes Operation Jericho, a combined RAF–Maquis raid which freed French prisoners from Amiens prison in which the Mosquitos took part.

== Plot ==
The Royal Air Force (RAF) begins attacking German V-1 flying bomb installations in early summer of 1944. (Note: The first V-1 fell on London on 13 June 1944.) When the de Havilland Mosquito fighter-bomber of Squadron Leader David "Scotty" Scott (David Buck) is shot down during a low-level bombing raid on a V-1 launching site, Scott and his navigator/bomb-aimer are assumed to have been killed. His wingman and friend, then-Flight Lieutenant (later Royal Canadian Air Force squadron leader) Quint Munroe (David McCallum) comforts Scott's wife, Beth (Suzanne Neve), and they rekindle a romance from years earlier. He also gets a job for her brother, Flight Lieutenant Douglas Shelton (David Dundas) as the squadron's training officer after he loses his right hand in combat.

After a photo-reconnaissance mission over the Château de Charlon in Northern France, Munroe is ordered by Air Commodore Hufford (Charles Gray) to lead an attack against the château using a Highball type bouncing bomb. When German fighters bomb and strafe his airfield, they drop a film revealing that captured French Maquis resistance fighters and Allied prisoners, including Scott, are being held at the château as "human shields".

The mission proceeds, aimed at a tunnel to an underground factory on the château grounds where new "V-3" long-range, multi-stage rockets are being constructed. The prisoners, held in the chapel during Sunday morning mass, are concentrated in a single location and the RAF has coordinated with French resistance fighters to evacuate the prisoners after a Mosquito uses a Highball bomb to blow a hole in the wall closest to the chapel. However, Father Belaguere (Michael Anthony), a Catholic priest and resistance agent, is killed by an enraged German officer, Oberleutnant Schack (Vladek Sheybal), for refusing to order the airmen back to their cells. The prisoners disarm Schack, push him outside, and barricade themselves in the chapel.

Munroe and Bannister drop their two Highballs, but both miss. After wingman Clark is shot down by a German fighter, they have just two bombs left. Bannister is shot down by flak and crashes into the tunnel, and his exploding bombs destroy the factory. Munroe blows apart the prison wall just as the Germans are about to breach the chapel door and machine-gun the prisoners. Most of the airmen escape with help from the resistance, but the senior RAF officer, Squadron Leader Neale (Bryan Marshall), is killed during the breakout. A second wave of Mosquitos obliterates the château complex with conventional bombs, whilst Flight Sergeant Wiley Bunce (Nicky Henson), Munroe's navigator, is killed.

Munroe and Scott are briefly reunited after Munroe's Mosquito is brought down by flak and he is wounded. Suffering from amnesia, Scott runs into the road to stop a German tank with a captured Panzershreck and remembers Beth just before the tank explodes, saving Munroe and the others but killing Scott.

The survivors are rescued by submarine and repatriated. Munroe is congratulated by his commanding officer, Wing Commander Penrose (Dinsdale Landen), as well as Air Commodore Hufford, and is reunited with Beth and Shelton. He conceals from Beth that her husband had been one of the prisoners.

== Cast ==
Actor	Role
David McCallum	Squadron Leader Quint Munroe, RCAF
Suzanne Neve	Beth Scott
Charles Gray	Air Commodore Hufford, RAF
David Buck	Squadron Leader David ("Scotty") Scott, RAF
David Dundas	Flight Lieutenant Douglas Shelton, RAF
Dinsdale Landen	Wing Commander Clyde Penrose, RAF
Nicky Henson	Flight Sergeant Wiley Bunce
Bryan Marshall	Squadron Leader Neale, RAF
Michael Anthony	Father Bellaguere
Peggy Thorpe-Bates	Mrs Scott
Peter Copley	Mr Scott
Vladek Sheybal	Lt. Schack
Michael McGovern	Flight Lieutenant Bannister, RAF
Michael Latimer	Flying Officer Clark, RAF (uncredited)
Derek Benfield	Airman Valet (uncredited)

== Production ==
Although not a sequel, the film is similar to the 1964 film 633 Squadron and was influenced by it, even using some of its footage. The pre-title sequence (including the aforementioned opening music by Frank Cordell) was also taken from the WWII film Operation Crossbow. Bovingdon Airfield in Hertfordshire was a location for many scenes; four "flightworthy" de Havilland Mosquito aircraft, including RR299, which eventually crashed and much later was destroyed in July 1996, were based at the airfield. The "chateau" used is actually Minley Manor, near Farnborough in Hampshire, Southern England.

The Highball weapon featured was an actual development of Barnes Wallis's "dam-busting" Upkeep bomb, and the footage of Mosquitoes dropping Highballs on land is genuine WWII archive footage, although in the event Highball was never used in combat. Charles Gray's character mentions Barnes Wallis during his briefing, in such a way as to erroneously imply that the name was well known to the RAF personnel (Wallis was not publicly identified as the Upkeep inventor until after the War). The special Highball bombsight is also a genuine representation of the one used in combat.

The car driven by David McCallum is a 1935 Godsal V8 Corsica.

== Soundtrack ==
The film features a memorable music score (starting with pounding bass drum beats to background the V-1 flying-bomb scenes) composed and conducted by Frank Cordell. Cordell's score was intended as a soundtrack album from United Artists Records that was never released until Film Score Monthly finally issued it on CD, paired with Cordell's score for Khartoum.

== Reception ==
Most reviewers concentrated on the low-budget production values, but the script and cast also received severe criticism from some quarters. In 1968, McCallum, attending a film festival in Nice, was quoted, “I’ve seen bongo films better than that Mosquito rubbish”.
