= Chasing Classic Cars =

2008 American TV documentary series

- Genre: Motoring, Documentary, Entertainment
- Created by: Jim Astrausky
- Written by: Jim Astrausky; Hannah Lintner
- Presented by: Wayne Carini
- Country of origin: United States
- Original language: English
- No. of seasons: 17
- No. of episodes: 204 (list of episodes)

Production
- Executive producers: Wyatt Channell (2009-10); Jim Astrausky and Dan Carey (2014-); Clint Stinchcomb
- Running time: 30 minutes
- Production company: Essex Television Group Inc.

Original release
- Network: Motor Trend
- Release: June 3, 2008 – August 18, 2021

Chasing Classic Cars is a US television documentary series presented by Wayne Carini of F-40 Motorsports and produced by Clint Stinchcomb. It looks at classic cars from all eras, focusing on finding and getting cars running, with the option of restoration and a likely sale. The series is aired on Motor Trend. The show is the most-watched car-related program in the United States, Russia, and Japan.

The series shows the restoration and auction process, and not all projects are financially successful. It has featured cars which have not previously been shown in public for decades.

== Episodes ==
Season	Episodes	Originally released	
Season	Episodes	First released	Last released
1	13	June 3, 2008	January 7, 2009
2	13	October 6, 2009	December 30, 2009
3	13	October 5, 2010	December 5, 2010
4	13	October 2, 2011	December 20, 2011
5	26	April 3, 2012	January 2, 2013
6	26	May 7, 2013	March 4, 2014
7	16	July 28, 2014	December 6, 2014
8	11	May 5, 2015	July 21, 2015
9	11	October 22, 2015	January 12, 2016
10	13	May 31, 2016	August 30, 2016
11	9	March 15, 2017	May 10, 2017
12	10	August 15, 2017	November 2, 2017
13	6	June 26, 2018	July 31, 2018
14	4	March 20, 2019	April 10, 2019
15	10	February 6, 2020	April 9, 2020
16	5	October 20, 2020	November 24, 2020
17	5	July 21, 2021	August 18, 2021
