= Front-engine, rear-wheel-drive layout =

Automobile layout

FR layout

A front-engine, rear-wheel-drive layout (FR), also called Système Panhard is a powertrain layout with an engine in front and rear-wheel-drive, connected via a drive shaft. This arrangement, with the engine straddling the front axle, was the traditional automobile layout for most of the pre-1950s automotive mechanical projects. It is also used in trucks, pickups, and high-floor buses and school buses.

It was pioneered by Amédée Bollée in his 1878 steam car La Mancelle and adopted in 1891 for internal-combustion-engine vehicles by Émile Levassor of Panhard et Levassor, hence the designation Système Panhard. Before pneumatic tyres were used, the final transmission was generally by chains from half-shafts on each side of the differential; this insulated the machinery from shocks from the road. (Note: This had been learned by bitter experience since the 1830s, when the axle of Gurney's direct-drive steam coach kept breaking but Hancock had no such problems with his chain drive. At horse-drawn speeds, wooden wheels flexed, providing a better ride, but they were not designed to handle torque at the nave. Chain drive helped with this, as the large rear sprockets were fixed to the inner spokes midway between the nave and the felloes.)

== Front mid-engine, rear-wheel-drive layout ==
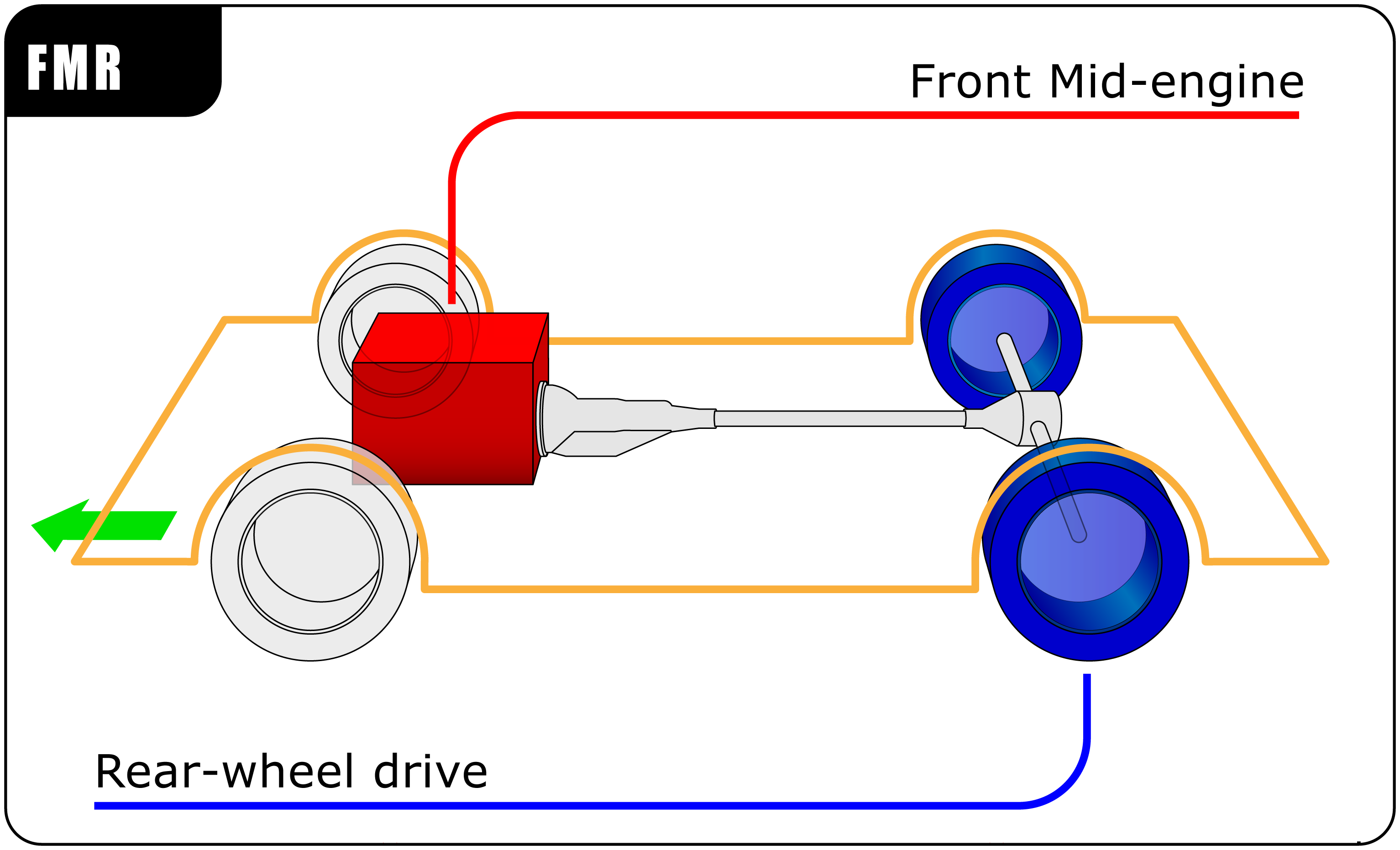
FMR layout, the engine is located behind the front axle

A front mid-engine, rear-wheel-drive layout (FMR) places the engine in the front half of the vehicle but behind the front axle, which likewise drives the rear wheels via a driveshaft. Shifting the engine's center of mass rearward aids in front/rear weight distribution and reduces the moment of inertia, both of which improve a vehicle's handling.While the mechanical layout of an FMR is substantially the same as an FR car, the classification of some models of the same vehicle may vary as either FR or FMR depending on the length of the engine (e.g. 4-cylinder vs. 6-cylinder) and its center of mass in relation to the front axle.

FMR cars are often characterized by a long hood and front wheels that are pushed forward to the corners of the vehicle, close to the front bumper. 2+2-style grand tourers often have FMR layouts, as a rear engine does not leave much space for rear seats.

== Gallery ==
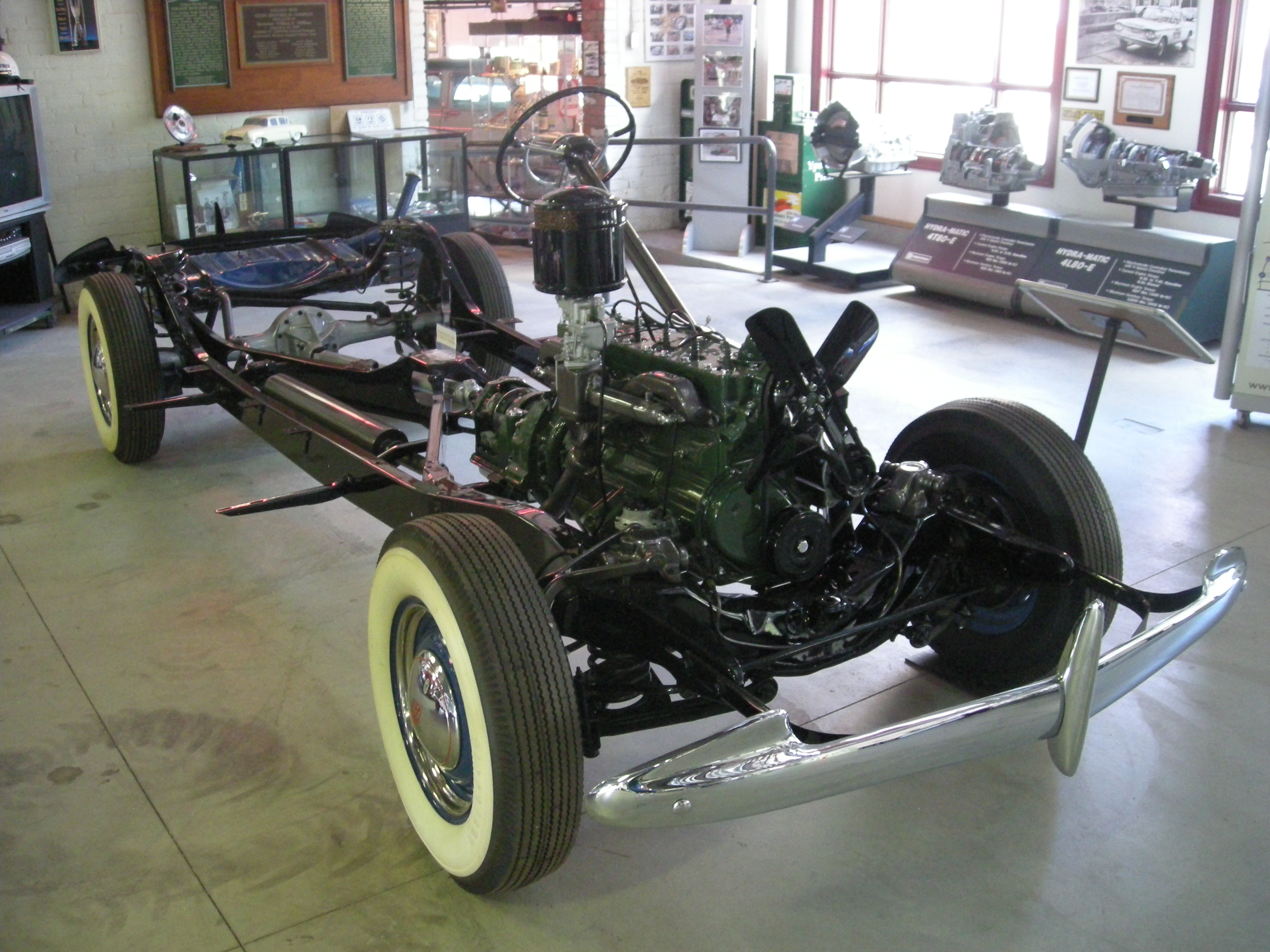
1940 Oldsmobile chassis showing a typical front-engine, rear-wheel-drive layout

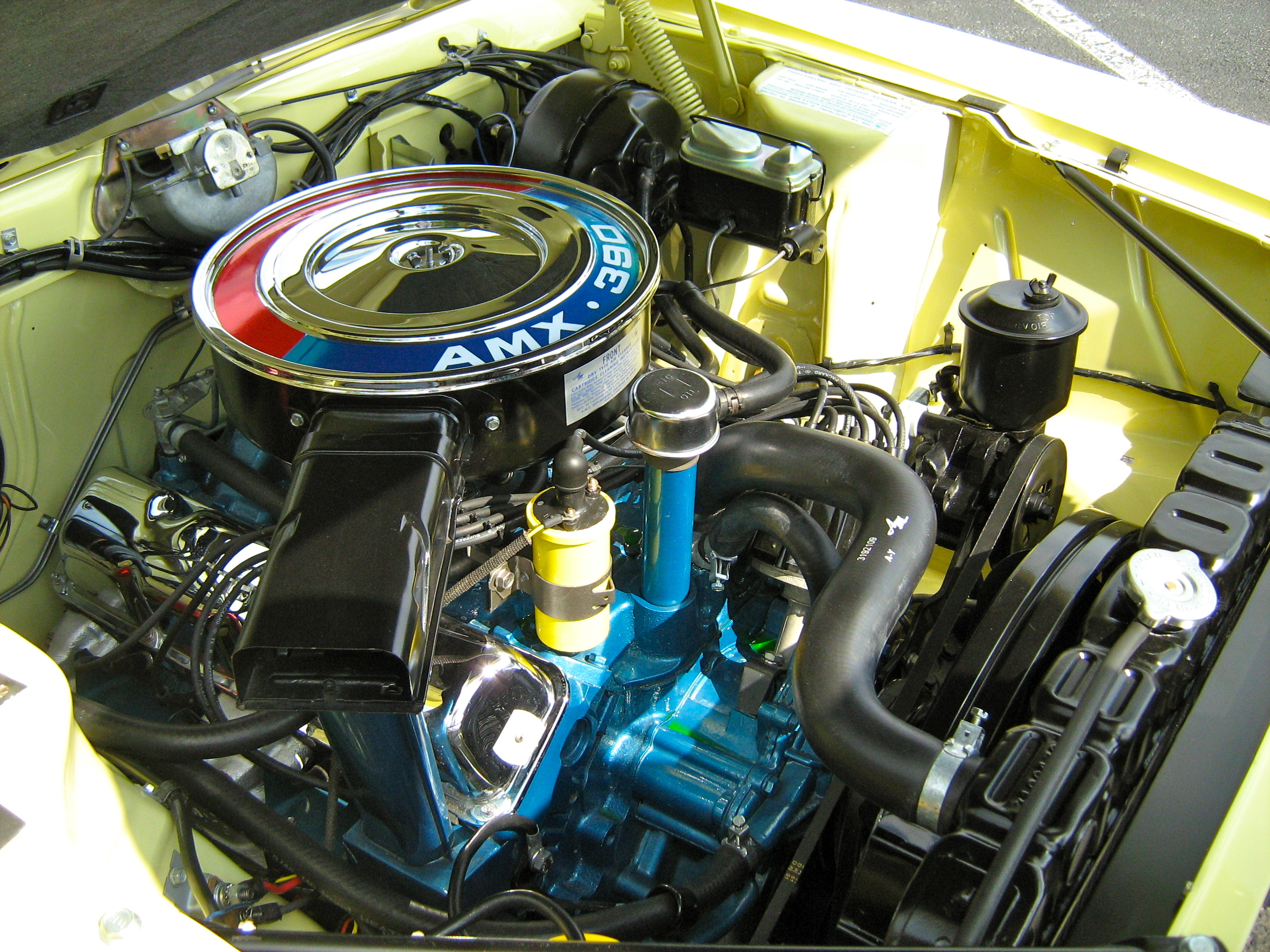
The 390 cid V8 engine in a FR 1968 AMC AMX functionally straddles its front axle, with the centerline of the shock towers basically bisecting the center of the air cleaner

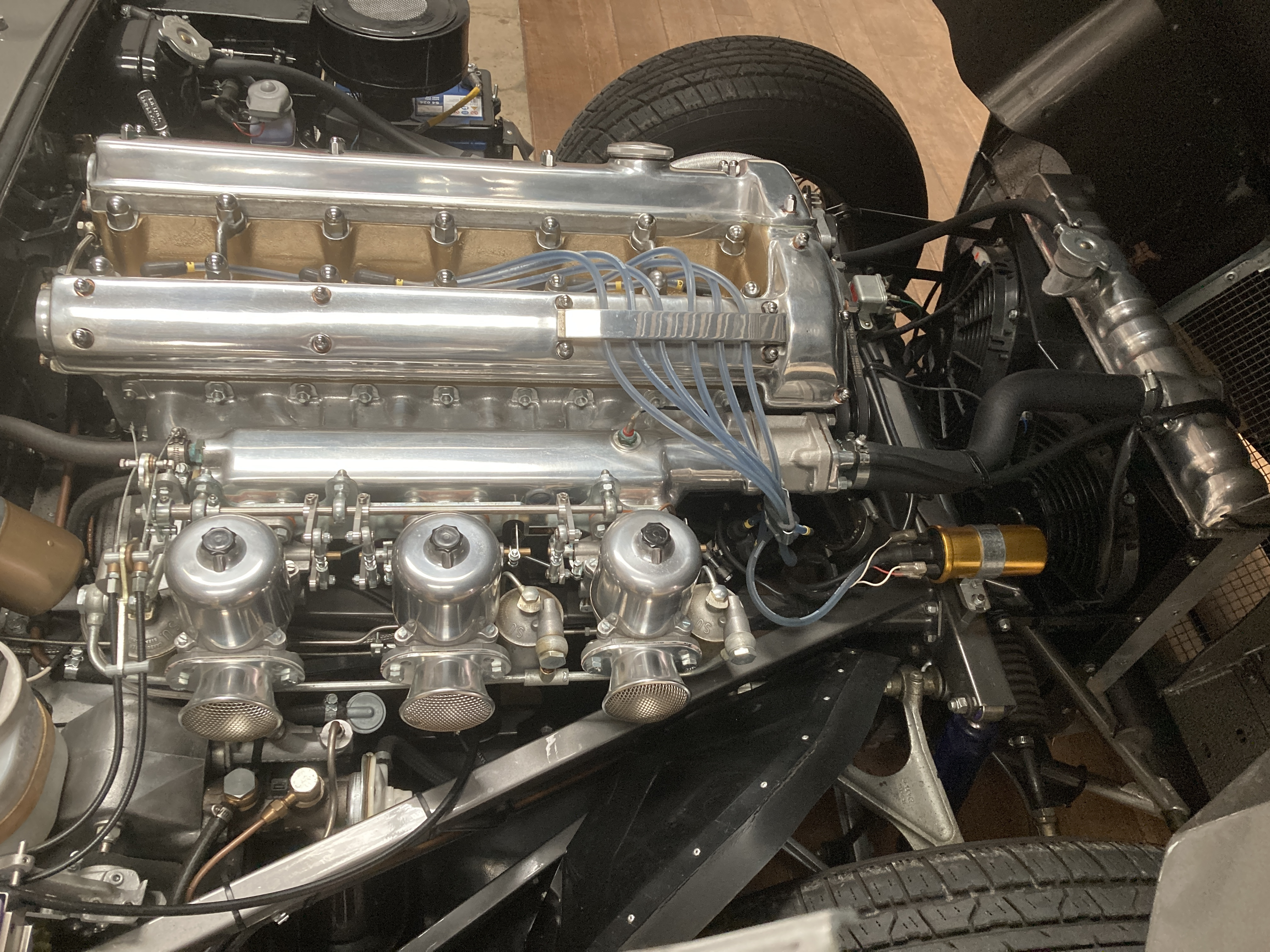
The straight-6 DOHC XK engine clearly sits behind the front axle of an FMR Jaguar E-Type

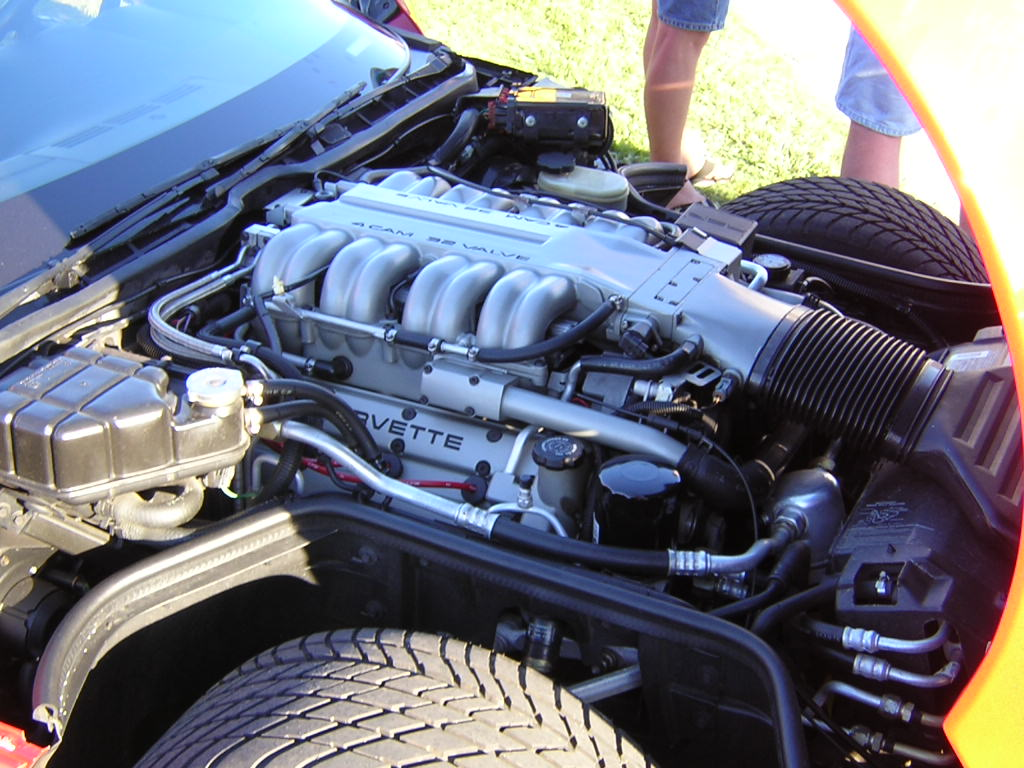
All Chevrolet Corvette from the second through the seventh generation are FMR. Only ancillary aspects of this Chevrolet Corvette ZR-1's engine may lie above the front axle.

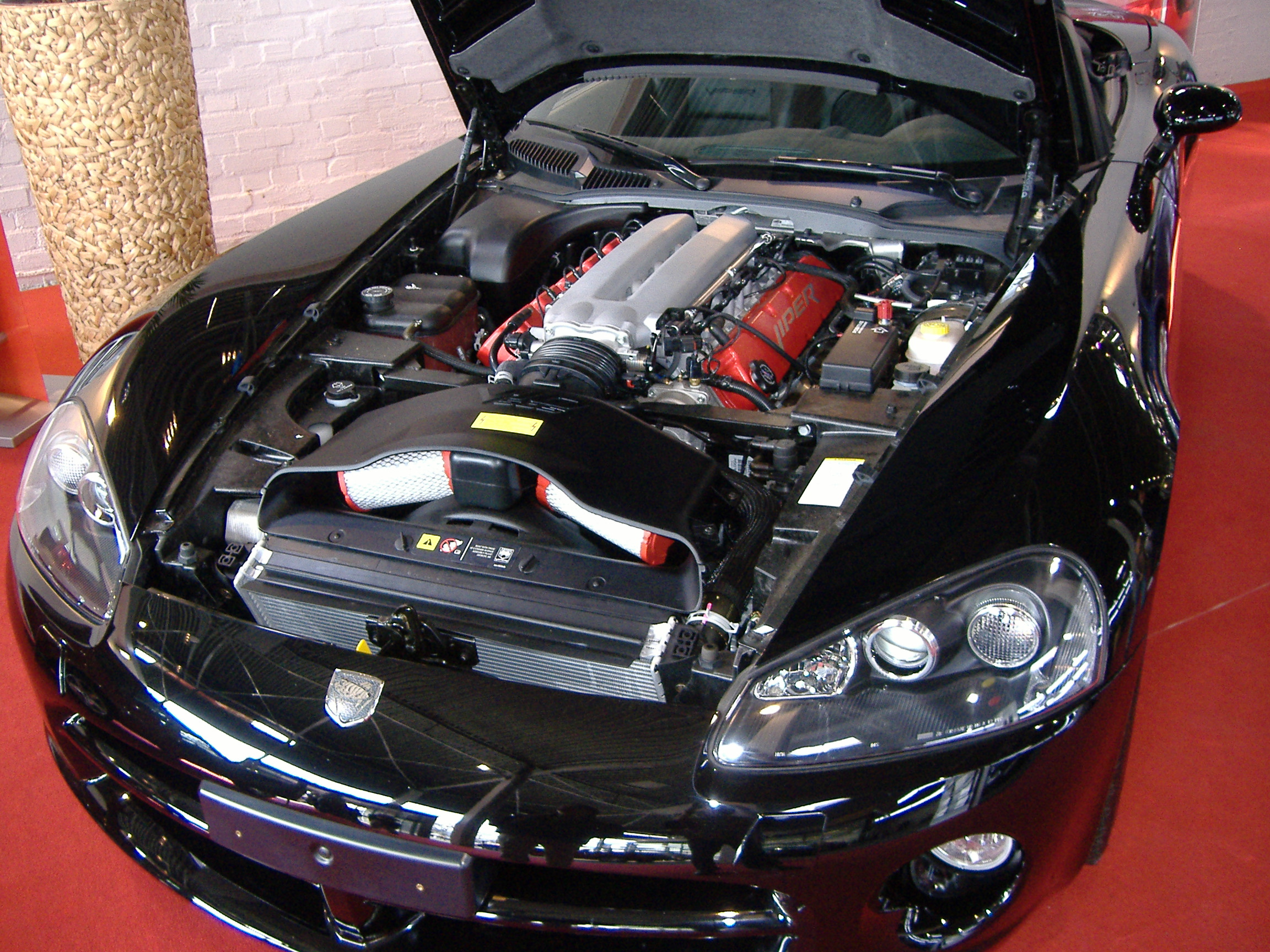
An FMR Dodge Viper showing its 8.4 L V10 positioned behind the car’s front axle

== See also ==
- Front-engine, front-wheel-drive layout
- Front-engine, four-wheel-drive layout
- Front-mid-engine, front-wheel-drive layout
- Rear-engine, rear-wheel-drive layout
- Rear mid-engine, rear-wheel-drive layout
