= Sliding pillar suspension =

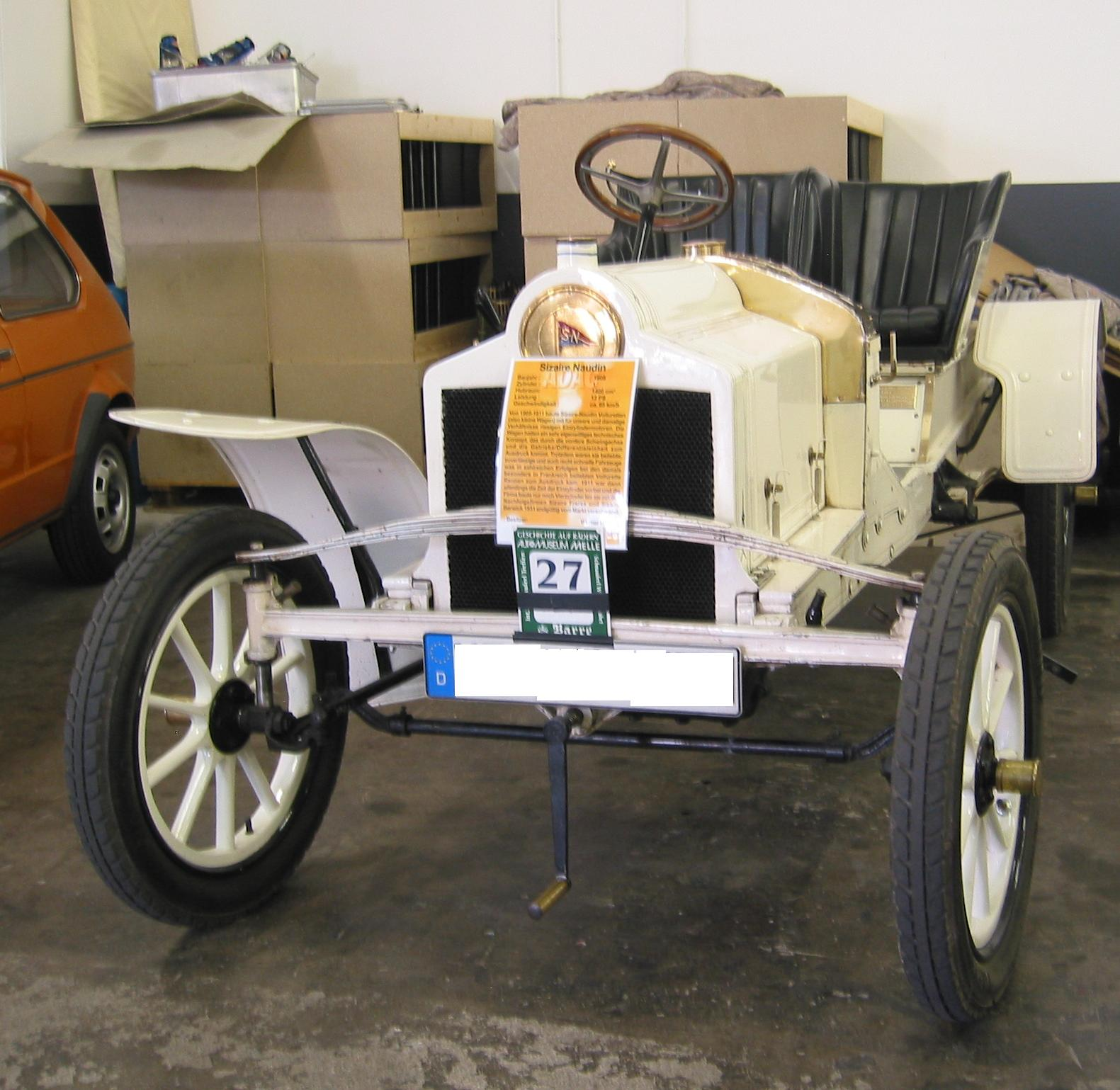
1908 Sizaire-Naudin

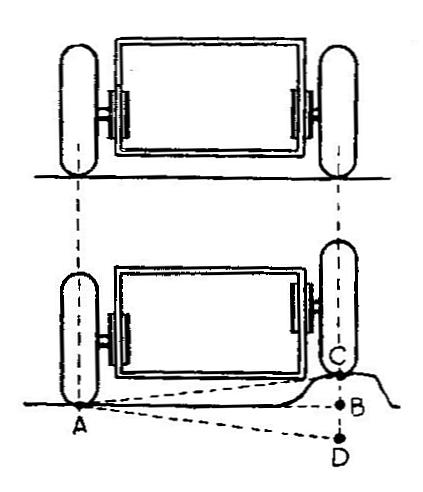
Schematic of a later 'inverted' sliding pillar, as for the Morgan

A sliding pillar suspension is a form of independent front suspension for light cars. The stub axle and wheel assembly are attached to a vertical pillar or kingpin which slides up and down through a bush or bushes which are attached to the vehicle chassis, usually as part of transverse outrigger assemblies, sometimes resembling a traditional beam axle, although fixed rigidly to the chassis. Steering movement is provided by allowing this same sliding pillar to also rotate.

Front wheel of Amédée Bollée's 1873 steam omnibus L'Obéissante

Sliding pillar independent suspension was first used by Amédée Bollée on his steam omnibus L'Obéissante in 1873, the first recorded instance of independent front suspension on a motor vehicle. He used vertical sliding pillars, one for each front wheel, with a pair of elliptical leaf springs cushioning each pillar. On the Bollée-Dalifol steam tram of 1876 he modified the suspension to use telescopic tubes, which may have contained coil springs.

The first sliding pillar suspension known to have used vertical coil springs was developed by John Henry Knight in 1895. For each front wheel he used a pair of springs with two pillars each.

A more commercially successful system was designed by Decauville in 1898. The stub axle carrying the wheel was fixed to the bottom of a pillar, common for both front wheels, which slid up and down through a bush in a transverse axle fixed to the front of the chassis. The top of the pillar was fixed and pivoted on a single transverse semi-elliptic leaf spring (as opposed to four springs on Bollée's and Knight's systems). The same system was copied by Sizaire-Naudin less than a decade later.

In around 1904, the New Jersey inventor J. Walter Christie developed a better coil spring pillar suspension system, which may be the inspiration for that later used by Lancia on its Lambda from around 1922. Lancia continued with sliding pillar suspension until the 1950s Appia. In turn, this was copied for a single year by Nash on its unibody 600 model.

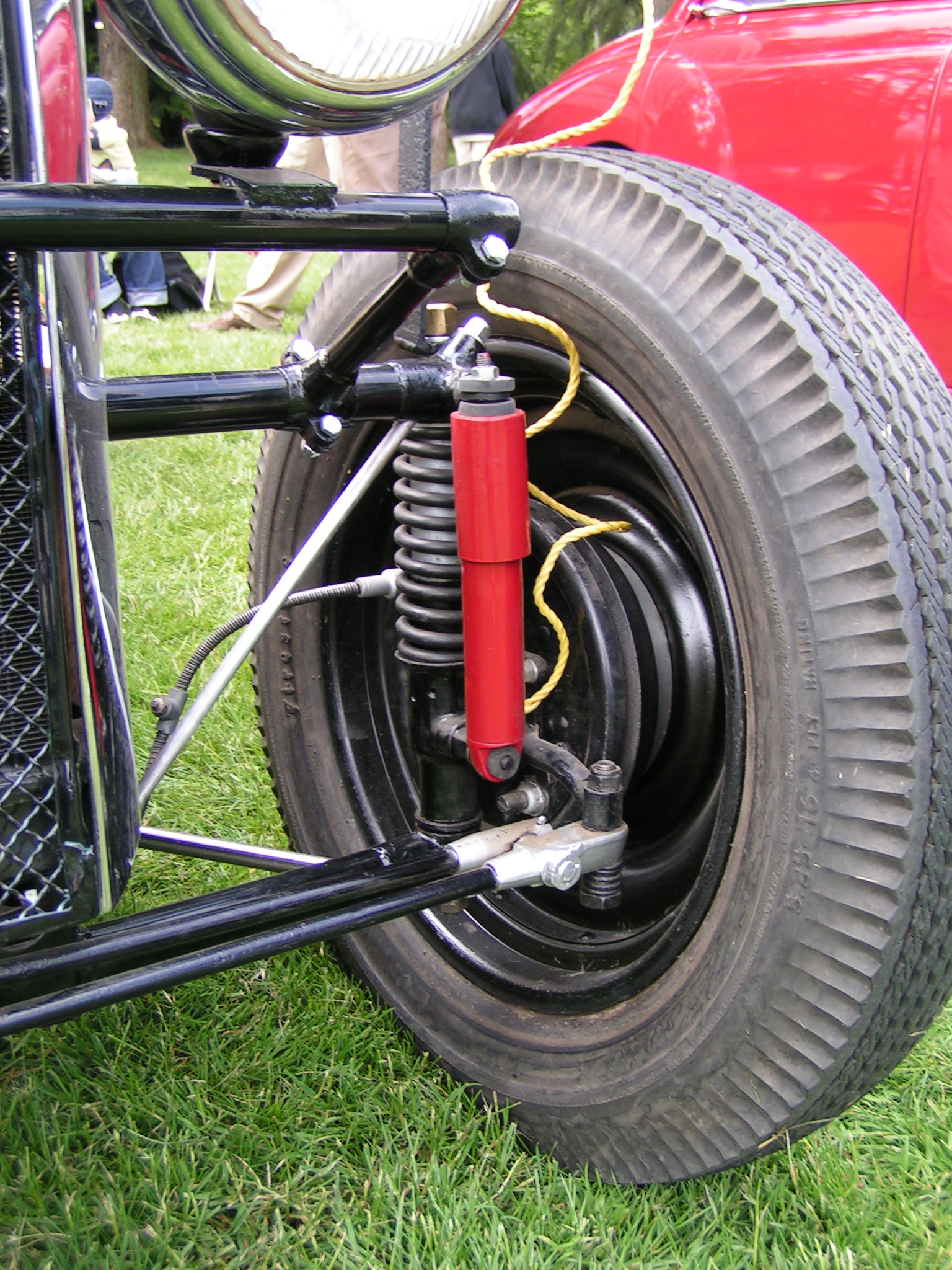
Sliding pillar suspension on a Morgan.

Sliding pillar suspension systems have also been used by several cyclecar manufacturers, the French maker Tracta, and in several prototype vehicles.

In 1909, H.F.S. Morgan introduced a fundamentally similar system using a sliding stub axle on a fixed pillar, used first on Morgan Motor Company cyclecars, then on their cars up to the current time. The Morgan design is an inverted sliding pillar, as are most of the later designs; the pillar is attached to the chassis and the stub axle is carried by the sliding sleeve over this.

A drawback of the sliding pillar system is that the track changes with differential suspension movement, such as when one wheel rises over an obstacle (as can be seen in the diagram above). This is particularly an issue where the track is narrow (as for cyclecars) in relation to suspension travel. The effective track is the hypotenuse AC or AD of the triangle ABC, where AB is the fixed pillar spacing. However, many types of suspension, such as the swing axle have similar issues. Track variation is usually considered less important than changes in wheel camber, which is almost nonexistent in a sliding pillar system (see suspension geometry).

This suspension system is rare, but was used most notably in the groundbreaking Lancia Aurelia coupe (1950–58).

== See also ==
- Plunger suspension - A similar sliding suspension, used for the rear suspension of some motorcycles.
