= Wayne Carini =

American car restorer and TV personality

- Born: October 13, 1951 (age 74); Portland, Connecticut, US
- Occupations: Car restorer; Television personality; Concours judge; Author
- Spouse: Laurie Carini (m. 1980)
- Children: 2
- Website: waynecarini.com

Wayne Carini (born October 13, 1951) is an American car restorer and TV personality. Carini starred in the Chasing Classic Cars TV series that began in 2008, was last produced in 2021, but continues to air on the Motor Trend channel.

== Early life ==
Carini was born in Portland, Connecticut. He is the son of Robert Carini who owned a collision repair and auto restoration business in Glastonbury, Connecticut. He eventually owned half of the business, inheriting the balance after his father's death.

== Career ==
Carini started his career in his father's shop while still in grade school, working together on classics including Duesenbergs, Lincolns, Packards, and Ford Model As. He owns three companies including F40 Motorsports (a dealership specializing in the sale of vintage and classic automobiles), Continental Auto Ltd. (a collision repair shop focusing on high-end and exotic cars), and Carini Carozzeria (a restoration shop for vintage and classic automobiles). Carini has assisted celebrities like David Letterman and Ivan Lendl find and purchase classic cars.

Carini has served as grand marshall and judge at numerous concours events around the world including serving as grand marshal at the Klingberg Vintage Motorcar Festival that supports the Klingberg Family Centers, a nonprofit agency that provides help to children and families dealing with abuse, neglect, family dynamic problems, and mental health issues.

He has appeared in the TV show My Classic Car and in the reality TV series Overhaulin' and Auction Kings.

Carini is the coauthor of the book Wayne Carini's Guide to Affordable Classics, author of the book, Wayne Carini: Steering through Life where he "looks back at a lifetime pursuing his automotive passions", and from 2022 through 2024, had a podcast, Talking Classic Cars with Wayne Carini and Jay Ward, that had a 5 out of 5 rating.

He is on the board of directors at CW Resources, a company that employs "all people including persons with disabilities, veterans, wounded warriors, and the economically disadvantaged".

=== Chasing Classic Cars ===
Carini's lifelong occupation of finding vintage cars and restoring them was noticed by Jim Astrausky, the chief executive of Essex Television Group. Astrausky approached Carini to host a television show about Carini's occupation. The show is on the Motor Trend channel, first airing in 2008 and last produced in 2021, but repeats continue to air on the channel. The show was the most-watched car-related program in the United States, Russia, and Japan.

== Personal life ==
Carini has been married since 1980 to Laurie Carini,and is the father of two daughters, one of whom had challenges with autism from an early age. Carini and his family contribute to charities including those that provide support for, and research regarding, children and adults with autism. His support includes such organizations such as Autism Speaks and Special Olympics.
