= List of Peugeot vehicles =

Peugeot has sold a number of vehicle models since 1896.

== Current production vehicles ==
Model	Calendar year introduced	Current model		Vehicle description
Model	Calendar year introduced	Introduction	Update/facelift	Vehicle description
Hatchbacks
208	2012	2019	2023	B-segment/subcompact hatchback, successor of the 207. Available in a battery electric version called e-208.
308	2007	2021	2025	C-segment/compact hatchback, successor of the 307. Available in plug-in hybrid and battery electric variants, as e-308.
Saloon/liftbacks
408	2010	2014	2022	C-segment/compact saloon based on the second-generation 308, mainly marketed in China and other Asian markets.
Station wagon/estates
308 SW	2007	2021	2025	Station wagon version of the 308.
SUV/crossovers
2008	2013	2019	2023	Subcompact crossover SUV (B-segment). Available in a battery electric version called e-2008.
3008	2008	2023	–	Compact crossover SUV. Plug-in hybrid variant available for the current generation, the next generation will be available in a battery electric version called e-3008. Sold as the 4008 in China.
408	2022	2022	2026	A liftback crossover based on the third-generation 308. Available in a battery electric version called e-408.
5008	2009	2024	–	Three-row mid-size crossover SUV, previously a compact MPV for the first-generation. Plug-in hybrid variant available.
Passenger vans
Rifter	2018	2018	2024	Passenger version of the Partner.
Traveller/Expert Combi	2015	2015	2024	Passenger version of the Expert.
Cargo vans
Boxer	1993	2006	2024	Light commercial vehicle and large van, rebadged Fiat Ducato. Available in a battery electric version called e-Boxer.
Expert	1994	2016	2024	Medium van. Available in a battery electric version called e-Expert.
Partner	1996	2018	2024	Compact van/leisure activity van. Available in a battery electric version called e-Partner. First-generation model continued to be produced and sold in Argentina, while the second-generation model continued to be produced and sold in Russia.
Pickup trucks
Landtrek	2020	2020	–	Double cabin pickup truck based on the Changan F70, successor to the Peugeot Pick Up.

=== Produced under license by IKCO ===
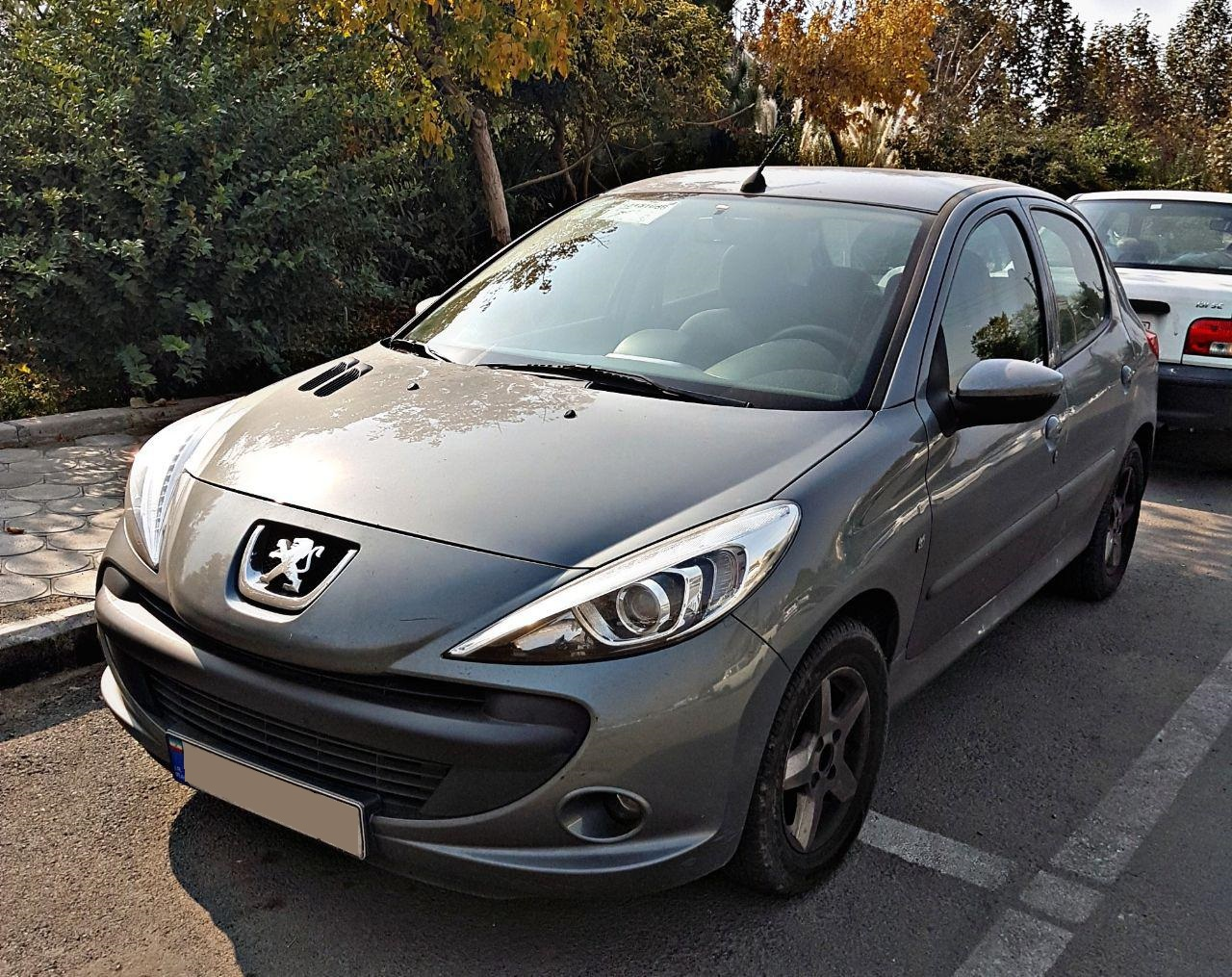
Peugeot 207i

== Former production vehicles ==
Image	Model Name	Introduction	Conclusion	Segment	Body Style	Predecessor	Successor	Related Vehicles	Notes
Numerical Nomenclature
	104	1972	1988	A	sedan hatchback coupe		205 106	Citroën LNA Citroën Visa Talbot Samba	
	106	1991	2003	A	3/5-door hatchback	104 205	107	Citroën Saxo	
	107	2005	2014	A	3/5-door hatchback	106 1007	108	Toyota Aygo Citroën C1	
	108	2014	2021	A	3/5-door hatchback	107		Citroën C1 Toyota Aygo	To cease production in 2020 with no plans for renewal.
	201	1929	1937	C	sedan panel van pickup	Type 190	202		
	202	1938	1948	B	sedan 2/4-door cabriolet coupe pickup	201	203		
	203	1948	1960	C	sedan estate coupe 2/4-door cabriolet	202	204		
	204	1965	1976	C	sedan estate coupe cabriolet panel van	203	304		
	205	1983	1998	A	cabriolet 3/5-door hatchback	104	106 206		
	206	1998	2016	B	3/5-door hatchback cabriolet estate sedan	205	207	Naza 206 Bestari Citroën C2 Citroën C3 IKCO Runna	
	207	2006	2014	B	3/5-door hatchback cabriolet sedan estate	206	208	IKCO 207 Citroën C3	
	301	1932	1936	D	panel van cabriolet coupe sedan	Type 177	302		Not to be confused with Peugeot 301 (2012).
	301	2012	2021	B	sedan	206/207 sedan			Not to be confused with Peugeot 301 (1932–36).
	302	1936	1938	C	sedan coupe cabriolet	301	304		
	304	1969	1980	C	sedan estate coupe cabriolet panel van	204 302	305		
	305	1977	1989	C	sedan estate panel van	304	309		
	306	1993	2002	C	3/5-door hatchback sedan estate cabriolet	309	307	Citroën Xsara Citroën ZX	
	307	2001	2014	C	3/5-door hatchback cabriolet sedan estate	306	308	Citroën C4 Citroën C4 Picasso	
	309	1985	1994	C	3/5-door hatchback	305	306		
	401	1934	1935	D	sedan coupe cabriolet	Type 176	402		
	402	1935	1942	D	sedan coupe cabriolet panel van	401	403		
	403	1955	1966	D	sedan estate cabriolet pickup panel van	402	404		
	404	1960	1991	D	sedan coupe estate cabriolet pickup	403	405 504		
	405	1987	1997	D	sedan coupe estate	404 505	406	Citroën BX IKCO Samand IKCO Dena Peugeot Pars	
	406	1995	2008	D	sedan coupe estate	405	407	Citroën Xantia	Continues production in refreshed appearance as the Pars for Iran.
	407	2004	2011	D	sedan coupe estate	406	508	Citroën C5 Citroën C6	
	504	1967	2006	D	sedan estate coupe cabriolet 2/4-door pickup	404	505		
	505	1979	1997	D	sedan estate	504	405		
	508	2010	2025	D	sedan estate	407 607		DS 9	
	601	1934	1935	E	sedan estate cabriolet coupe	Type 183	604		
	604	1975	1985	E	sedan	601	605	Talbot Tagora Citroën CX	
	605	1989	1999	E	sedan	604	607	Citroën XM	
	607	1999	2010	E	sedan	605	508	Citroën XM	
	806	1994	2002	M	mpv		807	Citroën Evasion Citroën Synergie Lancia Zeta Fiat Ulysse Citroën Jumpy Fiat Scudo	
	807	2002	2014	M	mpv	806	5008 II	Citroën C8 Fiat Ulysse Lancia Phedra Citroën Jumpy Fiat Scudo	
	905	1990	1993	Group C	race car		908		
	908	2007	2011	LMP1	race car	905			Known from 2007-10 as the 908 HDi FAP.
	1007	2005	2009	B	3-door mini mpv		107	Citroën C2 Citroën C3	
	4007	2007	2012	J	crossover (formerly mpv)		4008	Mitsubishi Outlander Citroën C-Crosser	
	4008	2012	2017	J	crossover	4007	3008 II	Mitsubishi ASX Citroën C4 Aircross	Slated for return in 2022.
Others
	RCZ	2009	2015	S	coupe				
	iOn	2009	2014	A	5-door hatchback			Mitsuoka Like Mitsubishi i-MiEV Citroën C-Zero	Rebadged Mitsubishi i-MiEV.
	Hoggar	2010	2014	C	pickup		Pick Up	Naza 206 Bestari Citroën C2 Citroën C3 IKCO Runna	
	Pick Up	2017	2020	C	pickup	Hoggar	Landtrek	Dongfeng Rich	Rebadged Dongfeng Rich
	D3	1950	1955	M	van		D4	Chenard-Walcker CPV	Sold from 1947 to 1950 as a Chenard-Walcker model until that company's acquisition.
	D4	1955	1965	M	van	D3	J7		
	J5	1981	1993	M	van mpv		Boxer	Alfa Romeo AR6 Fiat Ducato Citroën C25 Fiat Talento Talbot Express	
	J7	1965	1980	M	van mpv pickup	D4	J9		
	J9	1981	2010	M	van	J7			
	P4	1981	2016	J	SUV			Mercedes-Benz Geländewagen	Installation of Peugeot engine, transmission, and electrics into a Mercedes G-Wagen. Primarily used by various national militaries, including that of France.
	DMA	1941	1948	M	van pickup		D3		
	VLV	1941	1945	A	coupe				Early electric car created due to fuel rationing during the German occupation of France during the Second World War.
	Bipper	2007	2018	M	van		Partner	Fiat Fiorino Citroën Nemo Fiat Linea Fiat Qubo Ram V700 City Citroën Nemo Multispace	
	Bipper Tepee	2008	2018	M	mpv	1007	Rifter	Fiat Fiorino Citroën Nemo Fiat Linea Fiat Qubo Ram V700 City Citroën Nemo Multispace	Name used to signify passenger variant of the Bipper.

== Historical vehicles (1886-1928) ==
Image	Model Name	Introduction	Conclusion	Previous Model	Next Model	Notes
	Type 1	1886	1890		Type 2	The first car manufactured by Peugeot. Also known as the Serpollet Tricycle.
	Type 2	1890	1891	Type 1	Type 3	
	Type 3	1891	1894	Type 2	Type 4	
	Type 4	1892	1892	Type 3	Type 5	One-off car based on the Type 3 built to the specifications of Ali III ibn al-Husayn, then the Bey of Tunis.
	Type 5	1893	1896	Type 4	Type 6	
	Type 6	1894	1894	Type 5	Type 7	
	Type 7	1894	1897	Type 6	Type 8	
	Type 8	1894	1896	Type 7	Type 9	
	Type 9	1894	1897	Type 8	Type 10	
	Type 10	1894	1896	Type 9	Type 11	
	Type 11	1895	1897	Type 10	Type 12	
	Type 12	1895	1895	Type 11	Type 13	
	Type 13	1895	1895	Type 12	Type 14	
	Type 14	1896	1898	Type 13	Type 15	
	Type 15	1897	1901	Type 14	Type 16	
	Type 16	1897	1900	Type 15	Type 17	
	Type 17	1897	1902	Type 16	Type 18	
	Type 18	1897	1901	Type 17	Type 19	
	Type 19	1897	1902	Type 18	Type 20	
	Type 20	1897	1900	Type 19	Type 21	
	Type 21	1898	1901	Type 20	Type 22	
	Type 22	1898	1900	Type 21	Type 23	
	Type 23	1898	1901	Type 22	Type 24	
	Type 24	1898	1902	Type 23	Type 25	
	Type 25	1898	1898	Type 24	Type 26	
	Type 26	1899	1902	Type 25	Type 27	
	Type 27	1899	1900	Type 26	Type 28	
	Type 28	1899	1900	Type 27	Type 29	
	Type 29	1899	1900	Type 28	Type 30	
	Type 30	1900	1902	Type 29	Type 31	
	Type 31	1900	1902	Type 30	Type 32	
	Type 32	1900	1902	Type 31	Type 33	
	Type 33	1901	1902	Type 32	Type 34	
	Type 34	1900	1902	Type 33	Type 35	The brand's first vehicle offered in a truck body style.
	Type 35	1900	1902	Type 34	Type 36	
	Type 36	1901	1902	Type 35	Type 37	
	Type 37	1902	1902	Type 36	Type 39	
	Type 39	1902	1902	Type 37		
	Type 42	1903	1903	Type 39	Type 43	
	Type 43	1903	1903	Type 42	Type 44	
	Type 44	1903	1903	Type 43	Type 48	
	Type 48	1903	1909	Type 44	Type 49	
	Type 49	1903	1903	Type 48	Type 50	
	Type 50	1903	1903	Type 49	Type 54	
	Type 54	1903	1903	Type 50	Type 56	
	Type 56	1903	1903	Type 54	Type 57	
	Type 57	1904	1904	Type 56	Type 58	
	Type 58	1904	1904	Type 57	Type 61	
	Type 61	1904	1904	Type 58	Type 62	
	Type 62	1904	1904	Type 61	Type 63	
	Type 63	1904	1904	Type 62	Type 64	
	Type 64	1904	1907	Type 63	Type 65	
	Type 65	1904	1904	Type 64	Type 66	
	Type 66	1904	1904	Type 65	Type 65	
	Type 67	1904	1904	Type 66	Type 68	
	Type 68	1905	1905	Type 67	Bébé (Type 69)	The brand's first vehicle with a racing car body option.
	Bébé (Type 69)	1905	1916	Type 68	Type 71	The brand's first significantly exported model. Also known as the Type BP1.
	Type 71	1905	1905	Bébé (Type 69)	Type 72	
	Type 72	1905	1905	Type 71	Type 76	
	Type 76	1905	1905	Type 72	Type 77	
	Type 77	1905	1905	Type 76	Type 78	
	Type 78	1906	1906	Type 77	Type 80	
	Type 80	1906	1906	Type 78	Type 81	The brand's first cabriolet.
	Type 81	1906	1906	Type 80	Type 82	
	Type 82	1906	1906	Type 81	Type 83	
	Type 83	1906	1906	Type 82	Type 85	
	Type 85	1906	1906	Type 83	Type 88	
	Type 88	1907	1908	Type 85	Type 91	
	Type 91	1907	1908	Type 88	Type 92	
	Type 92	1907	1908	Type 91	Type 93	A version of this vehicles competed in the 1907 Targa Florio.
	Type 93	1907	1907	Type 92	Type 95	
	Type 95	1907	1907	Type 93	Type 96	
	Type 96	1907	1907	Type 95	Type 99	
	Type 99	1907	1907	Type 96	Type 101	
	Type 101	1908	1908	Type 99	Type 103	
	Type 103	1908	1908	Type 101	Type 104	
	Type 104	1908	1908	Type 103	Type 105	
	Type 105	1908	1909	Type 104	Type 106	
	Type 106	1908	1908	Type 105	Type 107	
	Type 107	1908	1908	Type 106	Type 108	
	Type 108	1908	1908	Type 107	Type 111	
	Type 111	1909	1909	Type 101	Type 129	
	Type 112	1909	1909	Type 107/Type 120	Type 122	
	Type 113	1909	1909	Type 103	Type 141	
	Type 116	1909	1909	Type 106	Type 126	
	Type 117	1909	1909	Type 107/Type 120	Type 133	
	Type 118	1909	1909	Type 108	Type 125	
	Type 120	1909	1909	Type 91	Various (101/133/111/129/131)	
	Type 122	1910	1910	Type 112	Type 130	
	Type 125	1910	1910	Type 118	Type 173	The brand's first vehicle deliberately sold as a sports car.
	Type 126	1910	1910	Type 48	Type 138	
	Type 127	1911	1911		Type 143	
	Type 129	1911	1911	Type 111	Type 139	
	Type 130	1910	1910	Type 122	Type 134	
	Type 131	1910	1910	Type 129	Type 139	
	Type 133	1910	1910	Type 117	Type 135	
	Type 134	1910	1910	Type 130	Type 135	
	Type 135	1911	1913	Type 134	Type 156	
	Type 136	1911	1913	Type 133	Type 145	
	Type 138	1911	1911	Type 126	Type 143	
	Type 139	1911	1911	Type 112	Type 145	
	Type 141	1911	1911	Type 113	Type 147	
	Type 143	1911	1912	Type 127 and Type 138	Type 153	
	Type 144	1913	1918	Type 139	Type 153	
	Type 145	1913	1914	Type 136	Type 174	
	Type 146	1913	1914	Type 145	Type 148	
	Type 147	1914	1914	Type 141	Type 150	
	Type 148	1914	1914	Type 146	Type 174	
	Type 150	1914	1914	Type 147		'Executive' model
	Type 153	1914	1925	Type 143	Type 176	Popularized by officers of the French Army during the First World War. Sub-types A, B, RS, & BR
	Type 156	1920	1923	Type 135		6-Cylinder, 6 Litre, large luxury car. Used as the official car of President of France Alexandre Millerand.
	Type 159	1920	1920	Lion-Peugeot	Type 163	
	Type 160	1913	1913			6-Cylinder, 7-Litre possibly preceded by Peugeot Type 156
	Quadrilette (Type 161)	1921	1922	Peugeot Bébé (Type 69 and Type BP1)	Peugeot 5CV (Type 172 BC)	
	Type 163	1921	1924	Type 159	Peugeot 301 (1932–36)	
	Type 172 (Quadrilette (Type 172) and 5CV series)	1923	1929	Type 163	Type 173	Sold under two different model names: Quadrilette (Type 172) and 5CV series (initially Type 172 BC)
	Type 173	1923	1925	Type 163	Type 177	
	Type 174	1923	1928	Type 145	Type 601	Often advertised by its fiscal horsepower as the 18HP.
	Type 175	1923	1924	Type 138	Type 176	
	Type 176	1924	1930	Type 153	Type 601	
	Type 177	1924	1929	Type 163	Type 181	
	Type 181	1925	1928	Type 177	12 CV Six (Type 183)	Often advertised by its fiscal horsepower as the 11HP.
	12 CV Six (Type 183)	1928	1932	Type 181	Type 184	
	Type 184	1928	1930	Type 183	Type 190	
	Type 190	1928	1931	Type 184	201	The last Peugeot to use the 'type' designation.

=== Lion-Peugeot Models ===
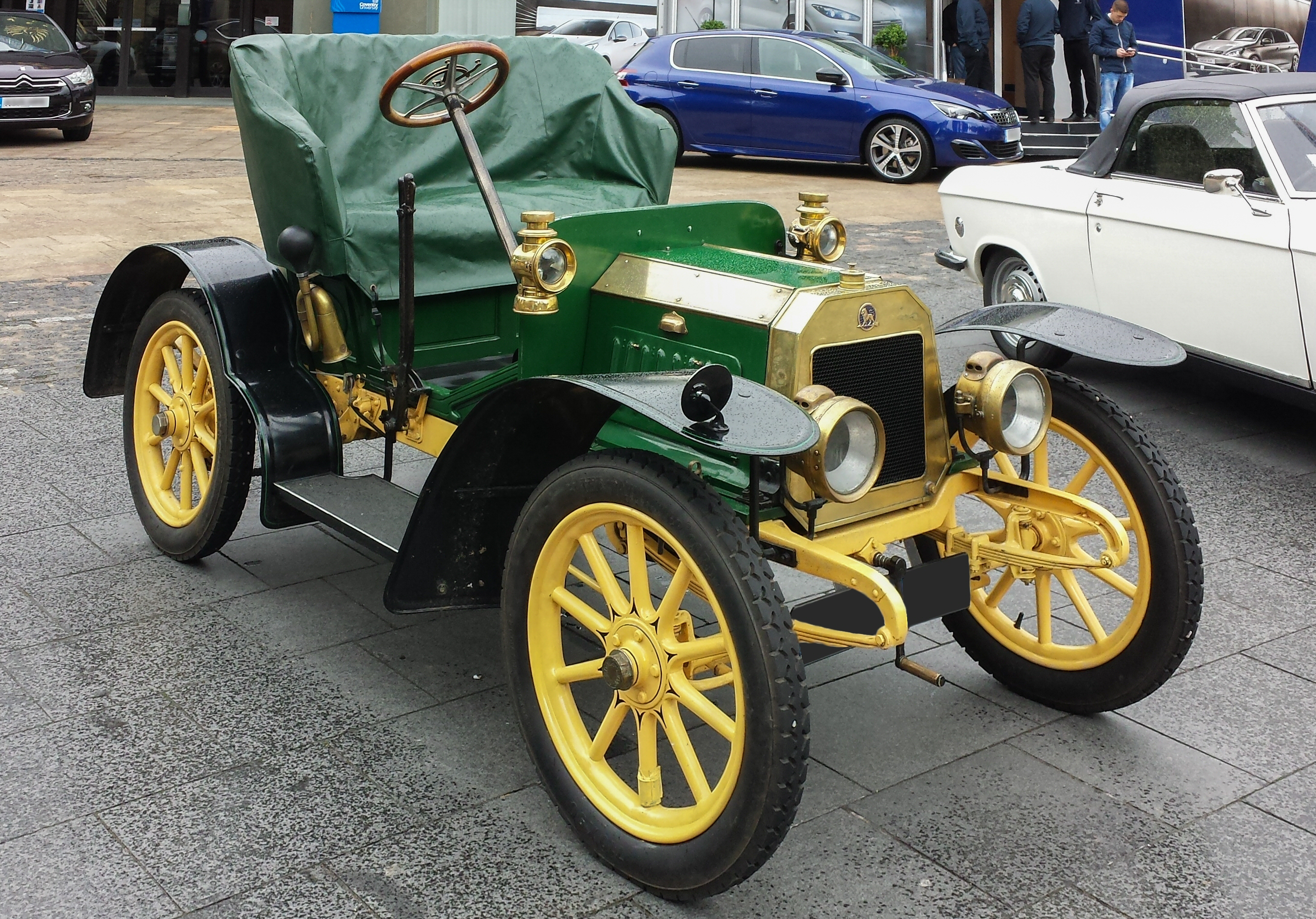
1907 Lion-Peugeot Type VA

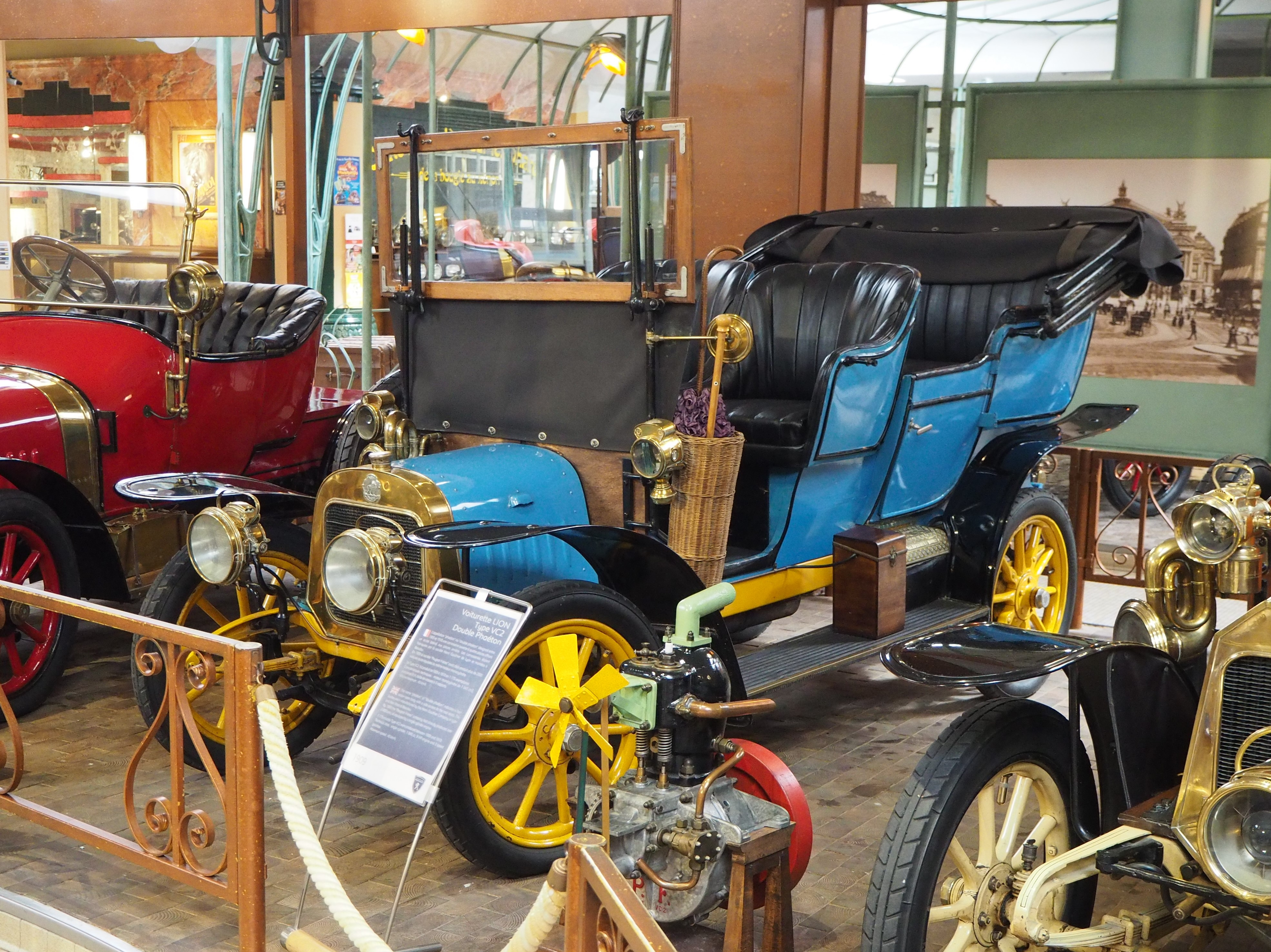
1909 Lion-Peugeot Type VC2

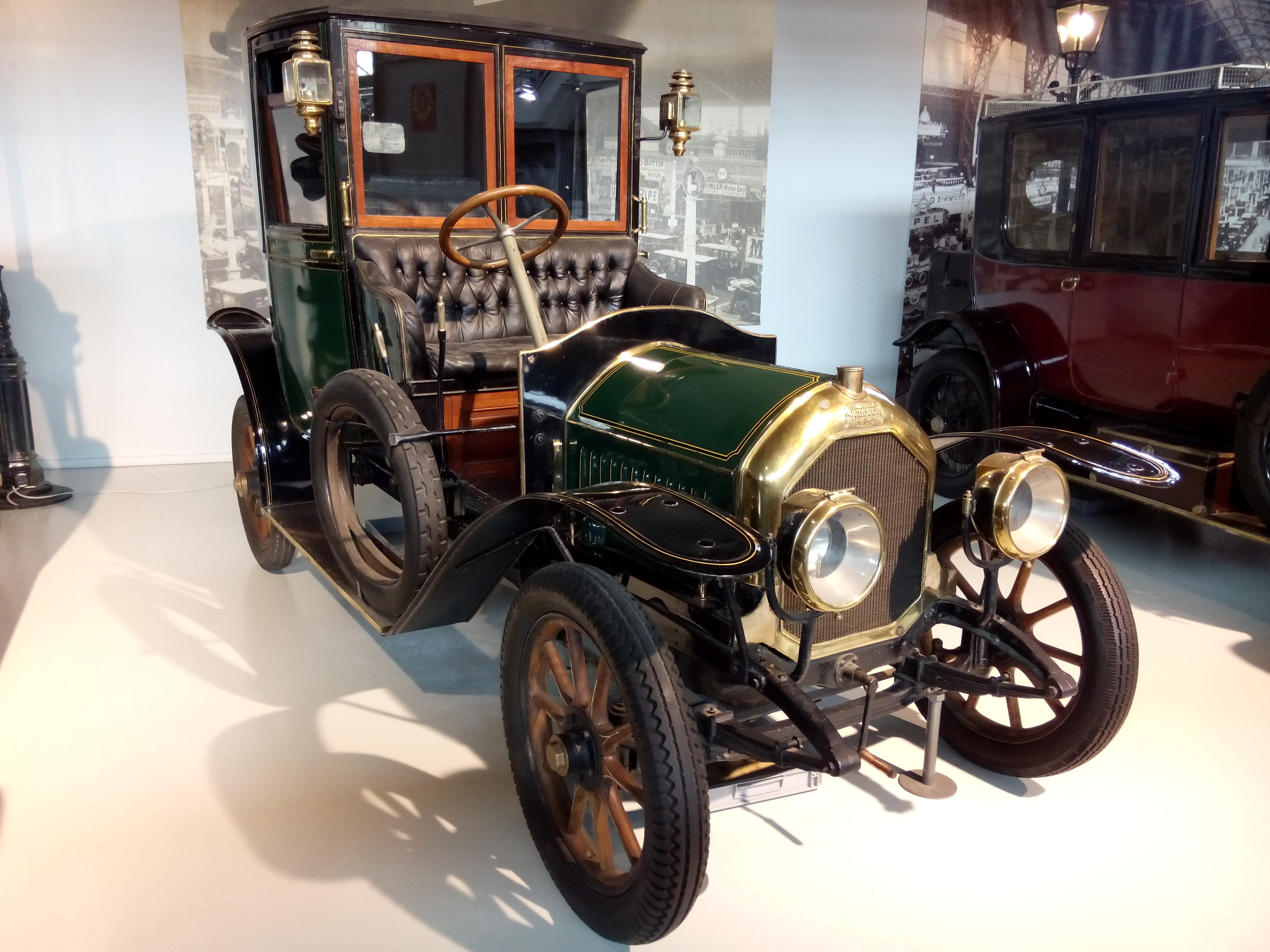
1915 Lion-Peugeot Type VD2

In establishing Automobiles Peugeot in 1886, Armand Peugeot split his company from the rest of the family company, overseen by his second cousin Eugène. When Eugène relinquished most of his control over the non-automobile portion of the company to his sons, they entered an agreement with Armand in which he would manufacture cars for their brand badged as "Lion-Peugeots". The two began a merger in 1910, though the separate badge was retained through 1916.

- Type VA (1906-8) - the first car from either Peugeot brand tell sell over 1000 units.
- Types VC:
  - Type VC1 (1906–10) - known simply as the Type VC until the introduction of additional models into the range.
  - Type VC2 (1909–10) - extended wheelbase variant of the VC1.
    - Type V2C2 (1910) - variant of the VC2 with a two-cylinder engine.
  - Type VC3 (1911) - successor to the VC1 and VC2, though very mechanically similar.
    - Type V2C3 (1911) - variant of the VC3 with a two-cylinder engine.
    - Type V4C3 (1912-3) - variant of the VC3 with a four-cylinder engine.
- Types VY:
  - Type VY (1908-9) - sporting variant of the VC1.
  - Type VY2 (1908-9) - extended wheelbase variant of the VY.
    - Type V2Y2 (1910) - successor to the VY2, now with a two-cylinder engine.
    - Type V2Y3 (1911) - successor to the V2Y2, though very mechanically similar.
- Types VD:
  - Type VD (1913-4) - known as the V4D for its second year of production.
    - Type VD2 (1915) - successor to the VD. The last Lion-Peugeot model due to the outbreak of the first world war. 06 DCJ 563

== Concept vehicles ==
Image	Vehicle Name	Segment	Designer	Display	Related Vehicles
	Quasar	S	Paul Bracq Gèrard Welter	1984 Paris Motor Show	205 T16
Peugeot RC	RC	S		2002 Geneva Motor Show	
	4002	S	Stefan Schulze	2003 Geneva Motor Show	
	Hoggar	J		2003 Geneva Motor Show	Hoggar
	907	S	Jean-Christophe Bolle-Reddat Gérard Welter	2004 Paris Motor Show	
	Quark	J		2004 Paris Motor Show	
	20Cup	B		2005 Frankfurt Motor Show	Mini Hatch 207
	908 RC	F		2006 Paris Motor Show	908 HDi FAP
	Flux	S	Mihai Panaitescu	2007 Frankfurt Motor Show	
Peugeot RC HYmotion4	RC HYmotion4	D		2008 Paris Motor Show	RC
Peugeot BB1	BB1	A		2009 Frankfurt Motor Show	
Peugeot RCZ HYbrid4	RCZ HYbrid4	S		2009 Frankfurt Motor Show	RCZ
Peugeot EX1 Concept	EX1	S		2010 Paris Motor Show	GT by Citroën
Peugeot HR1	HR1	J		2010 Paris Motor Show	Citroën Lacoste
Peugeot SR1	SR1	S		2010 Paris Motor Show	
	VeLV	A		2011 ADEME Innovation Forum	VLV
Peugeot Onyx	Onyx	S	Gilles Vidal	2012 Paris Motor Show	
Peugeot e-Legend	e-Legend	D	Nicolas Brissonneau (exterior); Christophe Pialat (interior)	2018 Paris Motor Show	
Peugeot Inception	Inception	C		CES 2023	
	Polygon	B			
	Concept 6 Shirui	F		2026 Beijing Motor Show	
	Concept 8 Luming	F		2026 Beijing Motor Show	
Peugeot E-T16	E-T16	B		2026 Paris Motor Show	
Peugeot RCZ Vision	RCZ Vision	S		2026 Paris Motor Show	

== See also ==
- Peugeot
- Lion-Peugeot
- Armand Peugeot
- Stellantis
- Groupe PSA
- Automotive Industry in France
- Category:Peugeot vehicles
- Category:Peugeot concept vehicles
