= Type 133 =

Type 133 may refer to:

- Lotus Type 133, a vehicle
- Bristol Type 133, an aircraft
- Peugeot Type 133, a Peugeot vehicle
