= Type 36 =

Type 36 may refer to:

- Bugatti Type 36, a car produced by Bugatti
- Peugeot Type 36, a car produced by Peugeot
- Bristol Type 36 Puma Tourer, a British civil utility biplane
- Type 36, a Chinese clone of the M3 submachine gun, manufactured in 1947
- Mil Mi-4, US DoD code name "Type 36"
