= Peugeot Type 64 =

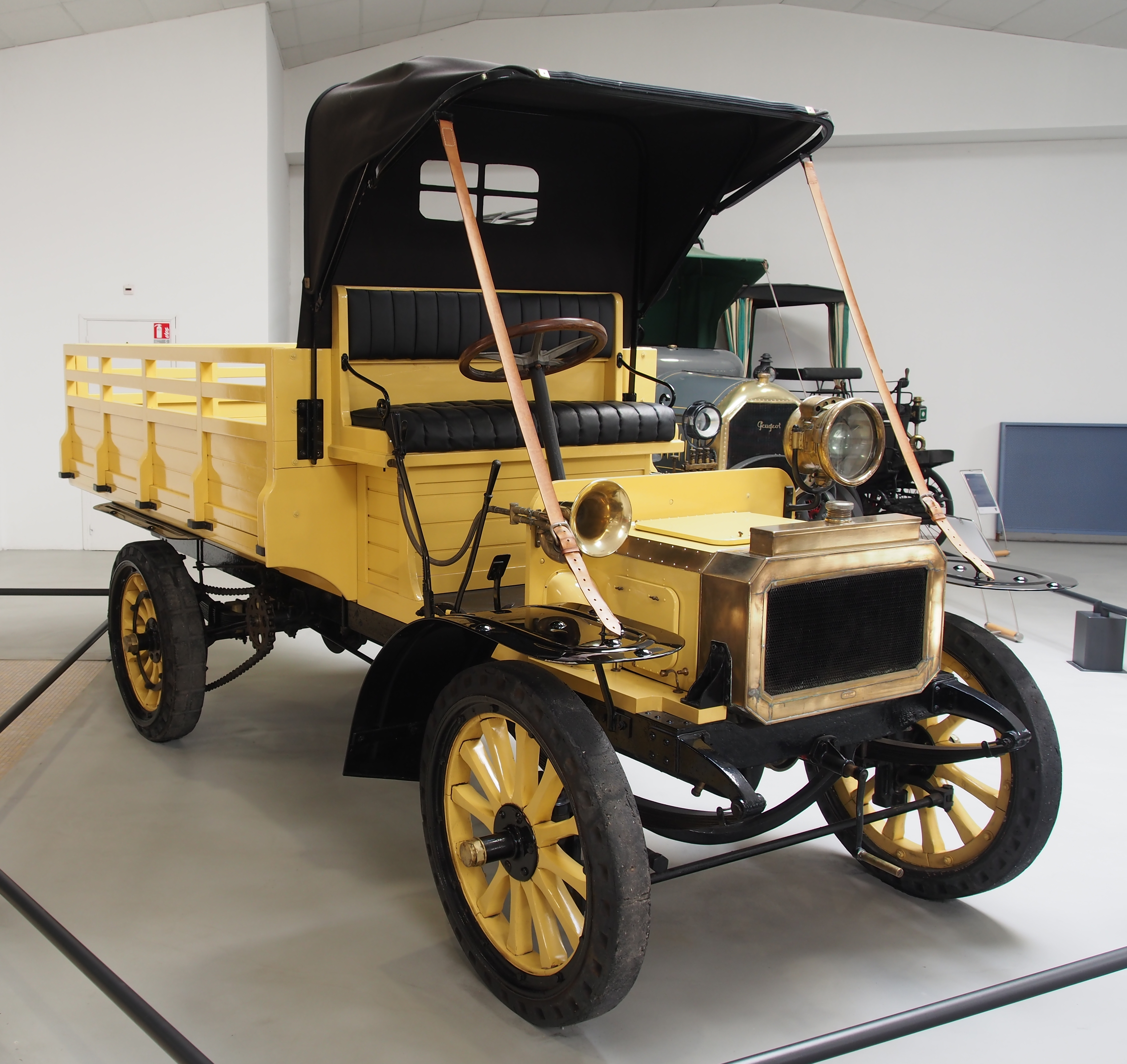
- 1905 example on display at Musée de l'Aventure Peugeot

Overview
- Type: Light truck
- Manufacturer: Peugeot
- Production: 1905–1908
- Assembly: France
- Designer: Armand Peugeot

Body and chassis
- Layout: Front-engine, rear wheel drive

Powertrain
- Engine: 1817 cc v-twin
- Power output: 10 hp
- Transmission: 4-speed manual

The Peugeot Type 64 was a model of early automobile manufactured by the French company Automobiles Peugeot between 1905 and 1908. It was powered by an 1817 cc v-twin engine making 10 horsepower. It was only constructed in the body style of a small truck (one of the first Peugeots to do so), which had a payload of 1,200 kg (2,600 lb).

Only four have been produced. The Type 64 and its Type 64B variant were replaced in 1908 by the Peugeot Type 108 delivery van.

== See also ==
- List of Peugeot vehicles
- Automotive industry in France
