= Type 66 =

Type 66 may refer to:

- Type 66 Howitzer, a Chinese-made version of the Soviet/Russian-made D-20
- Type 66 helmet, a Japanese-made combat helmet based on the American M1 helmet
- Peugeot Type 66, a French-made car made in 1904
