= Peugeot Type 125 =

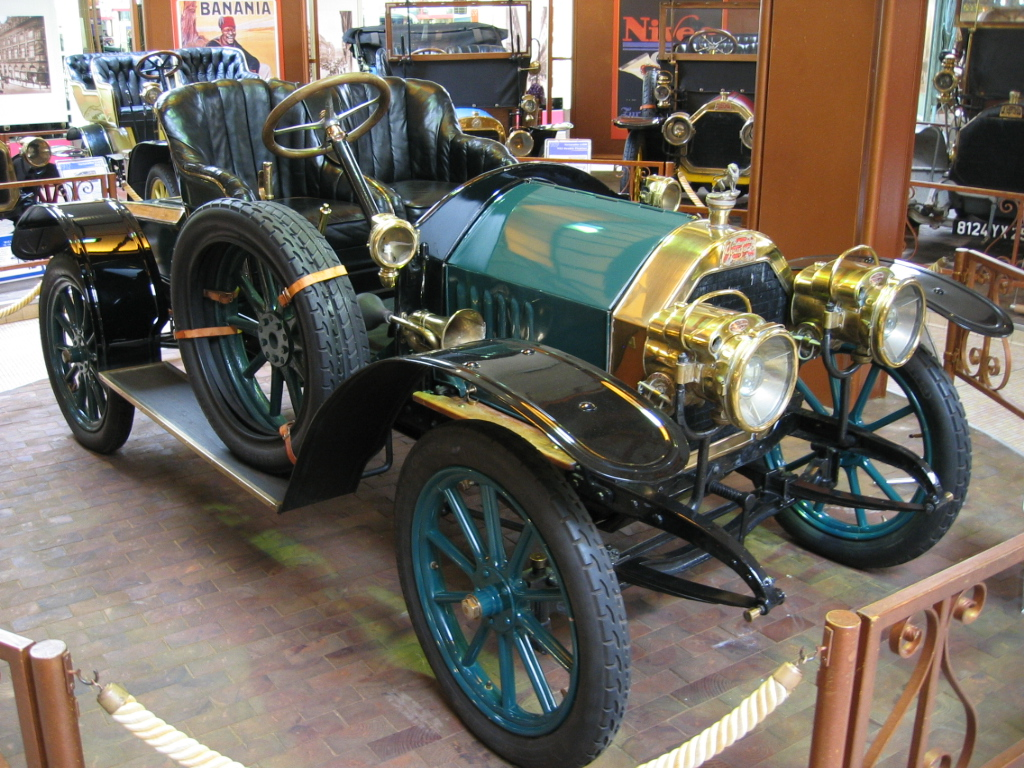

Overview
- Manufacturer: Peugeot
- Production: 1910; 150 produced
- Assembly: France: Audincourt

Body and chassis
- Layout: FR layout

Powertrain
- Engine: 1148 cc V-twin

Dimensions
- Length: 3.65 m
- Width: 1.60 m

Chronology
- Predecessor: Peugeot Type 118
- Successor: Peugeot Type 173

The Peugeot Type 125 was a midrange car from Peugeot produced in 1910. In less than a year of production, 150 units were built at their Audincourt factory. The car was billed as sporty; top speed from the 1.1 L engine was 50 kilometres per hour (31 mph).
