= Peugeot Type 181 =

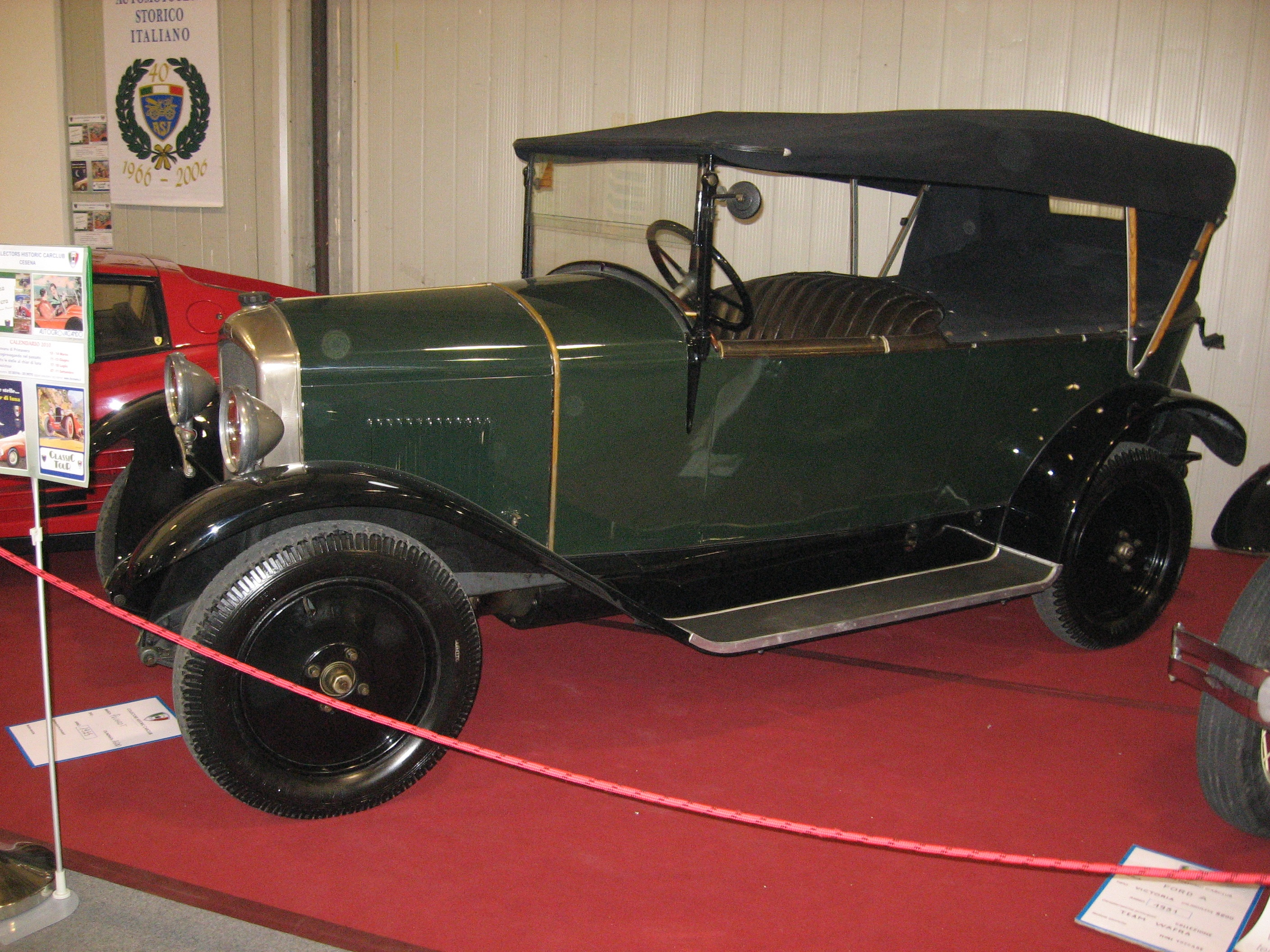

Overview
- Manufacturer: Peugeot
- Production: 1925–1928

Body and chassis
- Class: Small family car
- Layout: FR layout

Dimensions
- Wheelbase: 2795 mm standard 2865 mm “B” ("longue") model

Chronology
- Predecessor: Peugeot Type 173
- Successor: Peugeot 301

The Peugeot Type 181, also known at the time and normally advertised simply according to its fiscal horse power as the Peugeot 11HP, was a mid-range car produced between 1925 and 1928 by the French auto-maker Peugeot at their Audincourt plant.

The Type 181 was first presented in October 1924 at the 19th Paris Motor Show as a new model for 1925. Nearly 10,000 Type 181s were produced including, in 1928, Peugeot ‘s 100,000th automobile.

The car was closely related to the Peugeot Type 177, but came with a larger 1,615 cc side-valve four-cylinder engine, driving the rear wheels and delivering a claimed 40 hp.

The standard 181 model featured a 2795 mm wheelbase, while the slightly longer 181 B had a 2865 mm wheelbase. The cars’ overall lengths were respectively 4000 mm and 4070 mm, with a track of 1260 mm.

Various bodies were available including a “Torpedo”, an “all-weather cabriolet” and a “Coupé limousine” offering space for five people.

Type 181 production continued until 1928, by when 9,259 had been produced.

== Sources and further reading ==
- Wolfgang Schmarbeck: Alle Peugeot Automobile 1890-1990. Motorbuch-Verlag. Stuttgart 1990. ISBN 3-613-01351-7
