= Peugeot Type 160 =

Car model

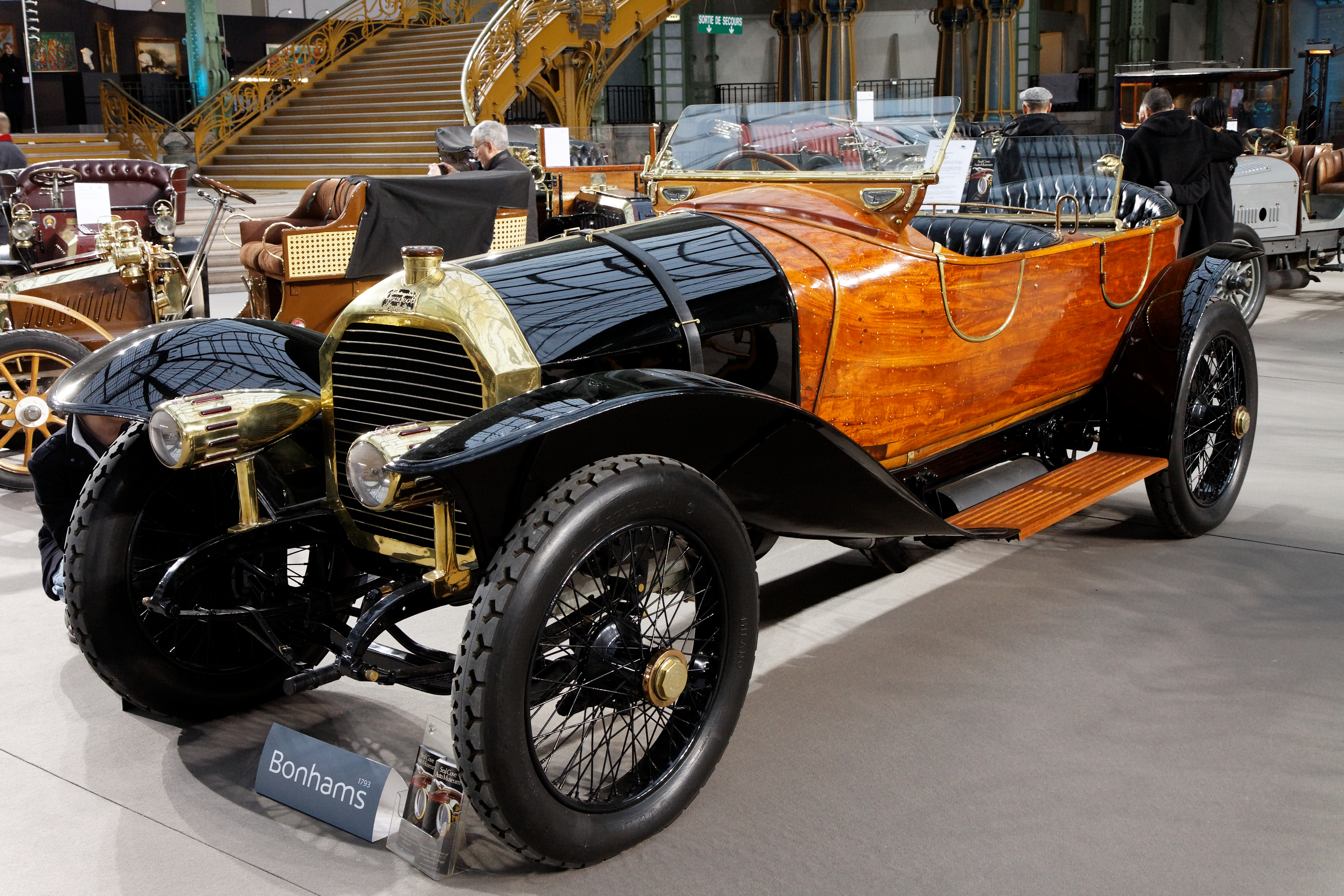
- Type 160 on display at the Grand Palais in 2011

Overview
- Manufacturer: Peugeot
- Production: 1913
- Assembly: France
- Designer: Armand Peugeot; Jean-Henri Labourdette

Body and chassis
- Class: fullsize luxury (F)
- Related: Type 156

Powertrain
- Engine: 7.0 litre inline-six

The Type 160 is an early large automobile manufactured by the French company Automobiles Peugeot in 1913. It was constructed by French private coachbuilder Jean-Henri Labourdette to be styled like a small boat, a trait from which it was also called the Skiff. In 2011, the Type 160 was exhibited by Bonhams in a collection entitled "110 years of the automobile" at the Grand Palais. The Type 160 currently resides at the Seal Cove Auto Museum in Seal Cove, Maine

== See also ==
- Peugeot
- List of Peugeot vehicles
