= Peugeot Type 57 =

Overview
- Manufacturer: Peugeot
- Production: 1904

Body and chassis
- Class: small car
- Layout: FR layout

Dimensions
- Wheelbase: 1,500 mm (59.1 in)
- Length: 2,300 mm (90.6 in)

The Peugeot Type 57 is an early motor vehicle produced in 1904 by the French auto-maker Peugeot at their Audincourt plant. 149 were produced.

== History ==
The vehicle was powered by a single cylinder four stroke engine. The Type 57, like the Type54 produced a year earlier, was a derivative of the 1902 Type 37, and all three cars did away with the Chain-drive mechanism that had been a feature of the small Peugeots at the start of the century. The engine was now mounted ahead of the driver, and power was delivered to the rear wheels via a drive-shaft. The 652 cc engine, located ahead of the driver, produced 5 hp (4 kW).

The Type 57 had a 1,500 mm (59.1 in) wheel base which was very slightly longer than that of the earlier Type 37 on which its design was based. The car itself was longer by 100 mm (3.9 in) at 2,300 mm (90.6 in).

The “Voiturette” format body offered space for two.

== Sources and further reading ==
- Wolfgang Schmarbeck: Alle Peugeot Automobile 1890-1990. Motorbuch-Verlag. Stuttgart 1990. ISBN 3-613-01351-7
