= Peugeot Type 10 =

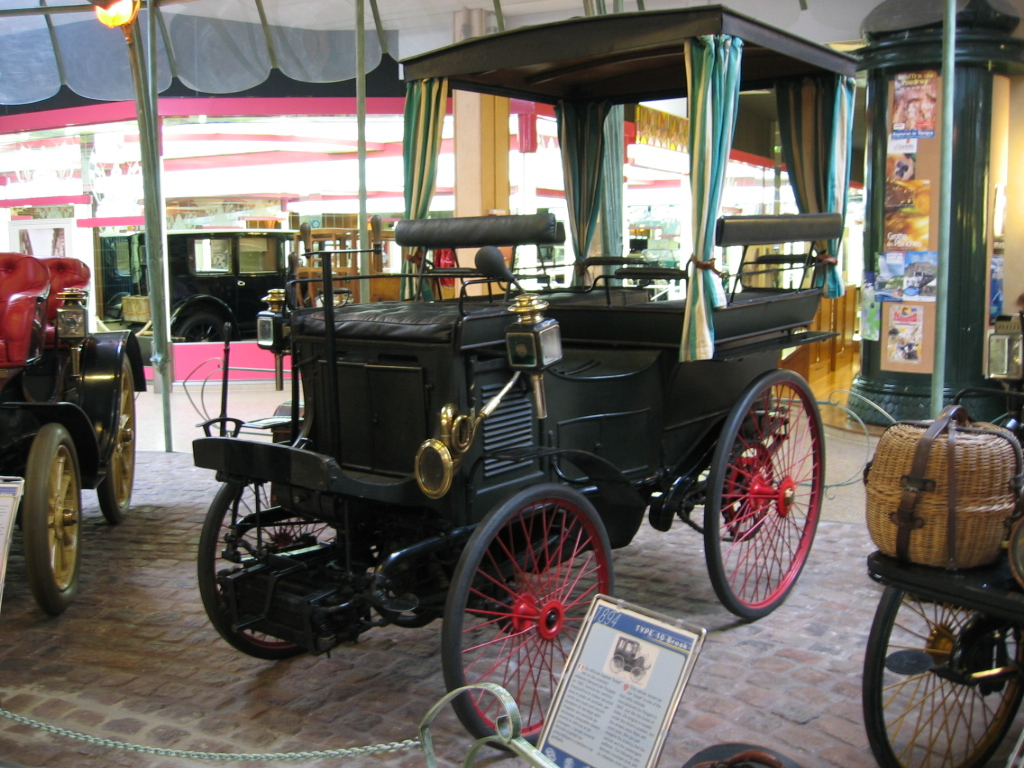

Overview
- Manufacturer: S. A. des Automobiles Peugeot
- Production: 1894–1896; 3 produced

Body and chassis
- Layout: RR layout

Powertrain
- Engine: 1.6 L V-twin

Dimensions
- Wheelbase: 1.55 metres (61 in)
- Length: 2.85 metres (112 in)
- Height: 1.53 metres (60 in)

Chronology
- Predecessor: Peugeot Type 9
- Successor: Peugeot Type 11

The Peugeot Type 10 was a 5-seater closed-top car (body style similar to that of an estate car) produced from 1894 to 1896 by Peugeot. The engine was a V-twin that displaced 1645 cc. Three units were made.
