= Peugeot Type 184 =

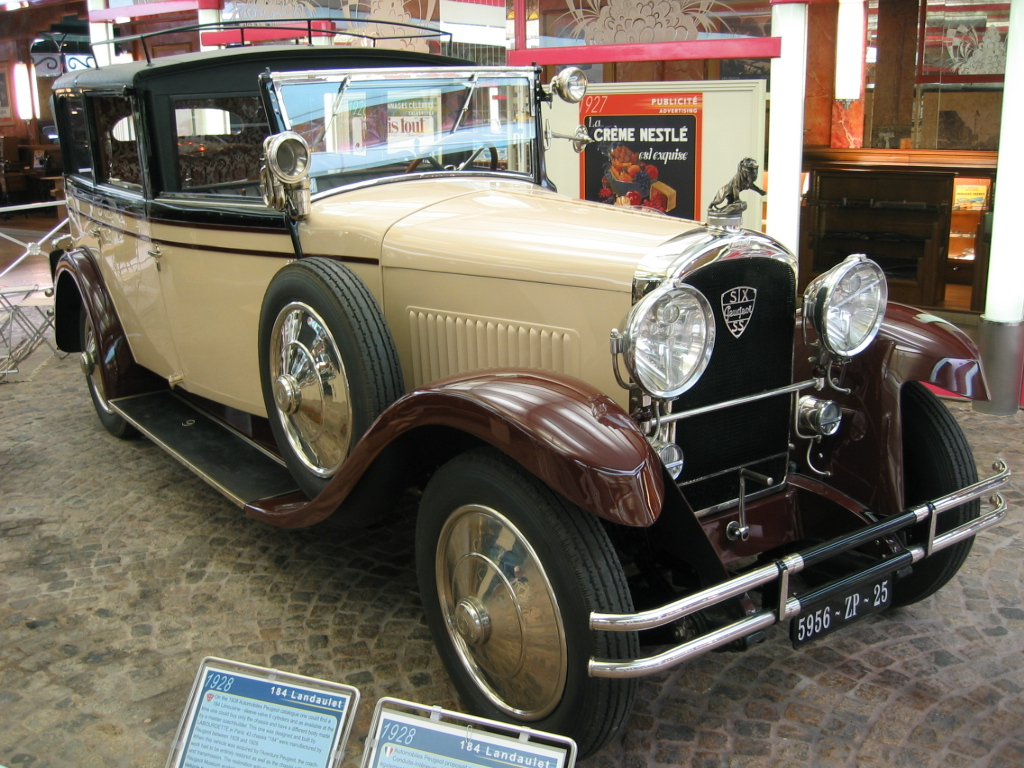

Overview
- Manufacturer: Peugeot
- Production: 1928–1929

Body and chassis
- Class: large car
- Layout: FR layout

Dimensions
- Wheelbase: 3,600 mm (141.7 in)
- Length: 5,200 mm (204.7 in)

The Peugeot Type 184 was a large car produced between 1928 and 1929 by the French auto-maker Peugeot at their Issy-les-Moulineaux plant. It represented an attempt to widen the range further upmarket, being larger than the Peugeot Type 174 which had itself been significantly upgraded in 1926. Its opulence was nevertheless out of touch with the market place at the time and the model was taken out of production, without a direct replacement, after less than two years.

The 184’s newly developed six-cylinder sleeve-valve 3,760 cc engine was positioned ahead of the driver and drove the rear wheels. A maximum power output of 80 hp (60 kW) at 3,000 rpm was claimed.

The car featured a 3,600 mm (141.7 in) wheelbase, supporting an overall length of 5,200 mm (204.7 in). Available bodies included a large “limousine” saloon/sedan, a “torpedo”, with space for six people as well as a “coupé-cabriolet” designed to accommodate just two.

The 184 was Peugeot’s last luxury car of this class: only 31 were produced. Later, the company would re-enter the luxury class in 1934 with the Peugeot 601, although it was a smaller car.

== Sources and further reading ==
- Wolfgang Schmarbeck: Alle Peugeot Automobile 1890–1990. Motorbuch-Verlag. Stuttgart 1990. ISBN 3-613-01351-7
