= Peugeot Type 153 =

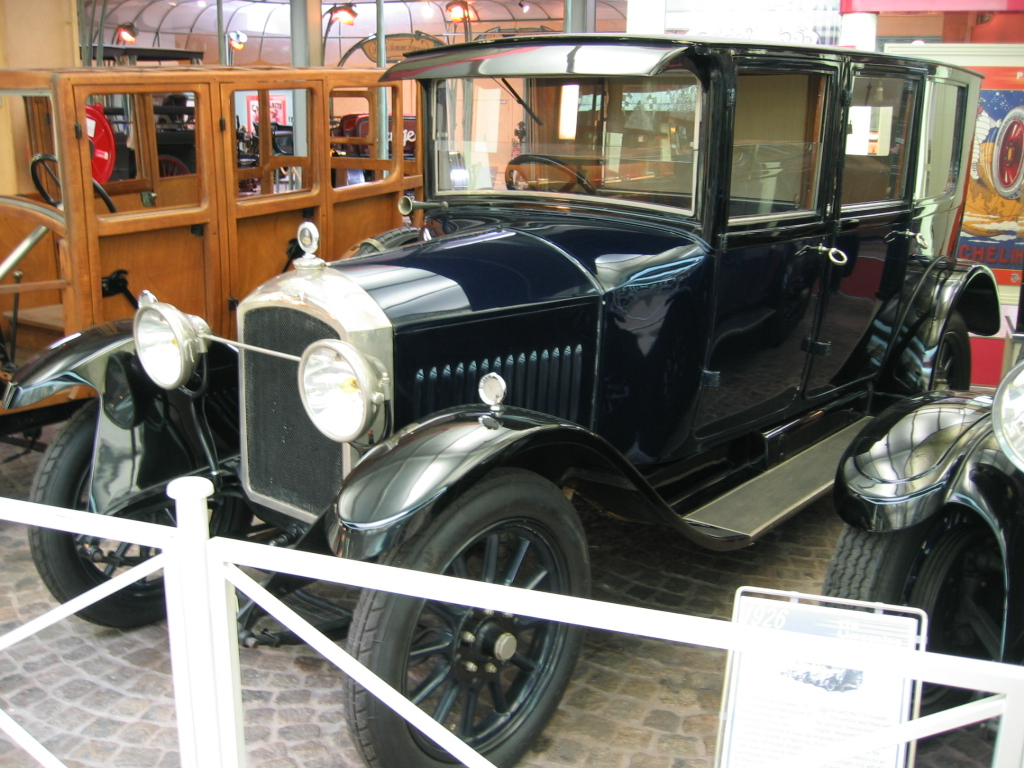

Overview
- Manufacturer: Peugeot
- Production: 1913–1916; 1920–1925; 3830 produced

Body and chassis
- Class: Midsize car
- Layout: FR layout

Powertrain
- Engine: 2.6 L I4; 2.7 L I4

Chronology
- Predecessor: Peugeot Type 143
- Successor: Peugeot Type 176

The Peugeot Type 153 was a new model from Peugeot for 1913, made in various forms until 1925.

== Original run ==
The Type 153 (the colonial version was known as the Type 153 A and used a different chassis) was produced until 1916 and held popularity among French Army officers during the First World War. Its original 2.6 L four-cylinder engine made 12 horsepower (8.9 kW). Production was ultimately halted to focus Peugeot's efforts on the war. 800 of this model were produced. There are less than ten left in the world and very few in running order, only one of which is known to be in the UK. A 153 Coloniale exists in New Zealand; this version has a higher straight chassis.

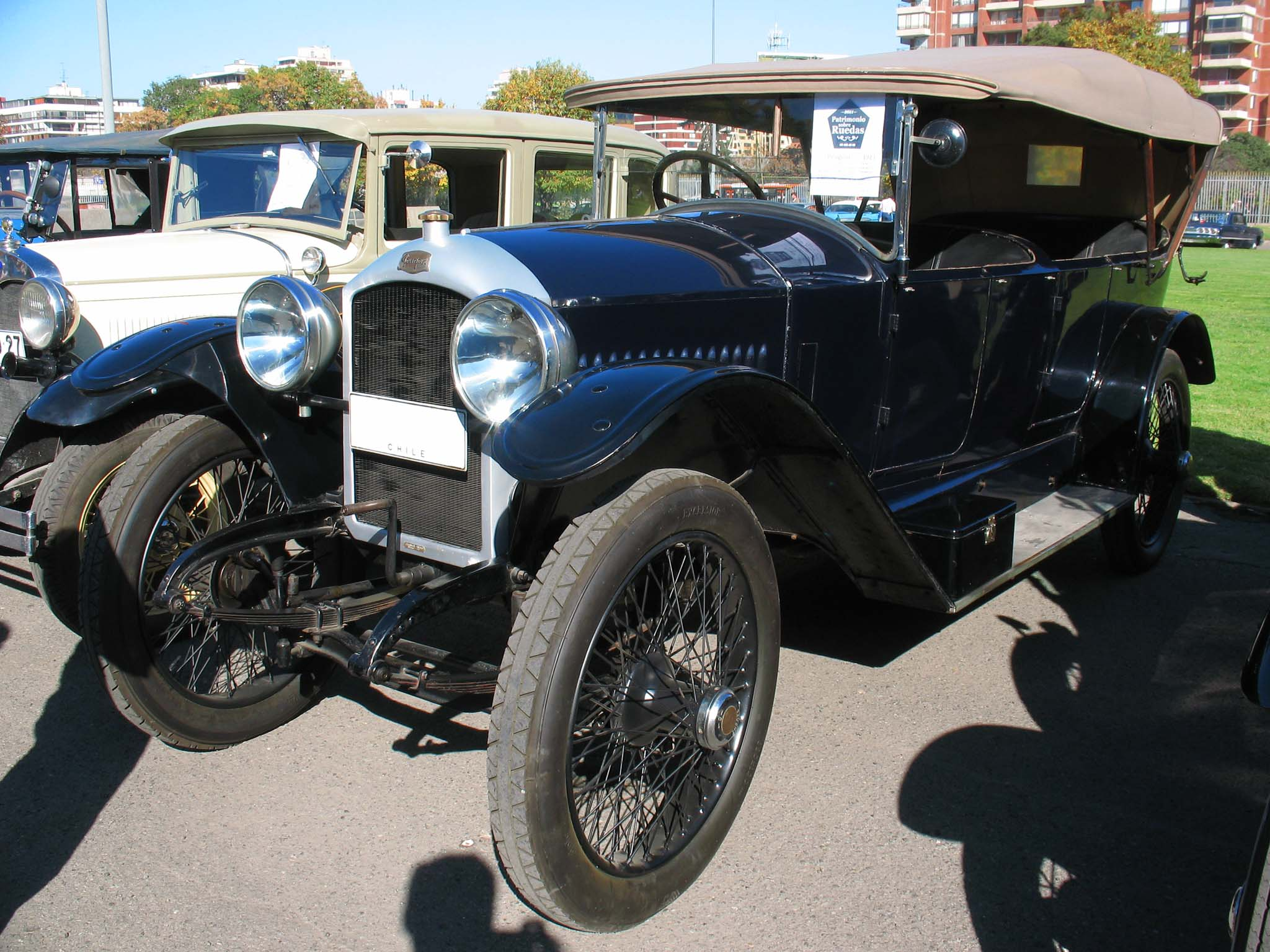
153 Phaeton 1923

== Postwar production ==
Production resumed in 1920. A revised Type 153 was given a new 2.7 L engine which made 14 PS (10.3 kW). The result was the Type 153 B and was assembled until 1922, with production coming to 1,325 units. A sportier version, lightened and producing 20 PS (14.7 kW), was unveiled in 1922 and called the Type 153 RS. This model sold 200 units. The Type 153 B was replaced in 1923 by the Type 153 BR. It carried on similar design to all past models, carried on the same 2.7 L engine but produced 15 PS (11.0 kW). The Type 153 BR was the final model and it was sold 1,505 units before production ceased in 1925. Production of all Type 153 models came to 3,830.
