= Peugeot Type 31 =

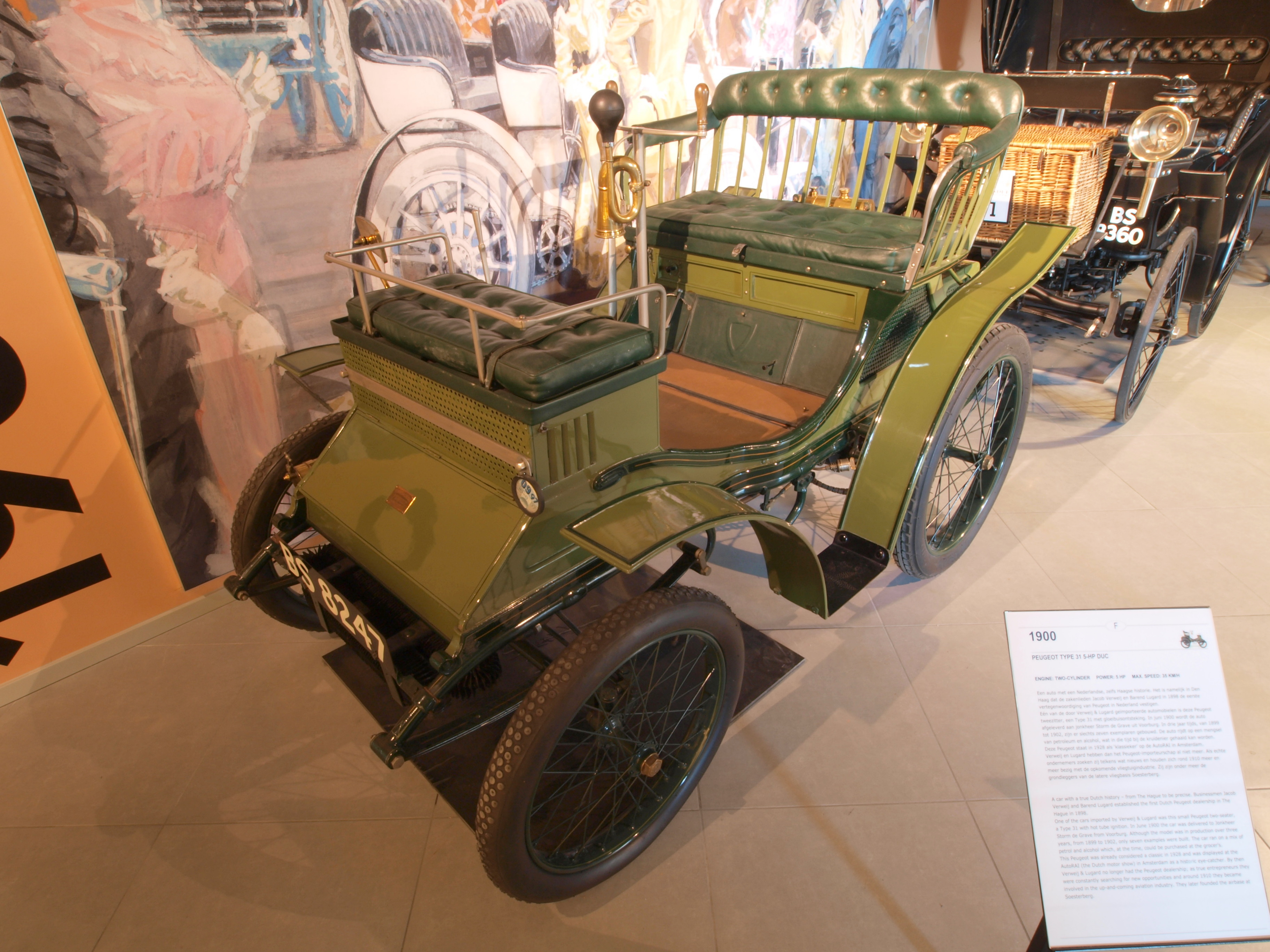

Overview
- Manufacturer: Peugeot
- Production: 1900 – 1902

Body and chassis
- Class: small car
- Layout: FR layout

Dimensions
- Wheelbase: 1,300 mm (51.2 in)
- Length: 2,100 mm (82.7 in)

The Peugeot Type 31 is an early motor vehicle produced between 1900 and 1902 by the French auto-maker Peugeot at their Audincourt plant. It was probably the smallest Peugeot ever offered for sale. Only 7 were produced.

The vehicle was powered by a rear-mounted four stroke engine, manufactured by Peugeot themselves. The engine's two cylinders were mounted in parallel and not in the V-format used for the company's first petrol engined vehicles. The engine was mounted behind the driver and his (or, at least in principle, her) passenger above the rear axle. A maximum output of 8 hp (6 kW) was delivered to the rear wheels via a chain-drive mechanism.

The car shared the frame of the manufacturer’s earlier Type 24, introduced two years earlier, but was shorter. The Peugeot Type 31 is believed to have been the shortest Peugeot ever to have been put into production. A wheelbase of 1,400 mm (55.1 in) supported a vehicle length of 2,100 mm (82.7 in), on which sat a relatively tall two person carriage format “Duc” body.

The Type 31 was produced until 1902.

== Sources and further reading ==
- Wolfgang Schmarbeck: Alle Peugeot Automobile 1890-1990. Motorbuch-Verlag. Stuttgart 1990. ISBN 3-613-01351-7
