= Peugeot Type 108 =

Overview
- Manufacturer: Peugeot
- Production: 1908

Body and chassis
- Class: mid-sized car
- Layout: FR layout

Dimensions
- Wheelbase: 2,555 mm (100.6 in)

Chronology
- Predecessor: Peugeot Type 99
- Successor: Peugeot Type 118

The Peugeot Type 108 is a motor car produced by the French auto-maker Peugeot at their Audincourt plant in 1908. 301 were produced.

The car represented an evolution from the company's Type 99, but it was larger, and its engine was now a front-mounted twin-cylinder unit of 1,527 cc delivering a maximum of 10 hp (7 kW), to the rear wheels by means of a rotating steel drive shaft.

The 2,555 mm (100.6 in) wheelbase supported body lengths up to 3,600 mm (141.7 in), and many of the Type 108s found themselves used by the taxi trade. Body formats included a four-seater “Droschke” as well as a delivery van with space for two.

== Sources and further reading ==
- Wolfgang Schmarbeck: Alle Peugeot Automobile 1890-1990. Motorbuch-Verlag. Stuttgart 1990. ISBN 3-613-01351-7
