= Peugeot Type 28 =

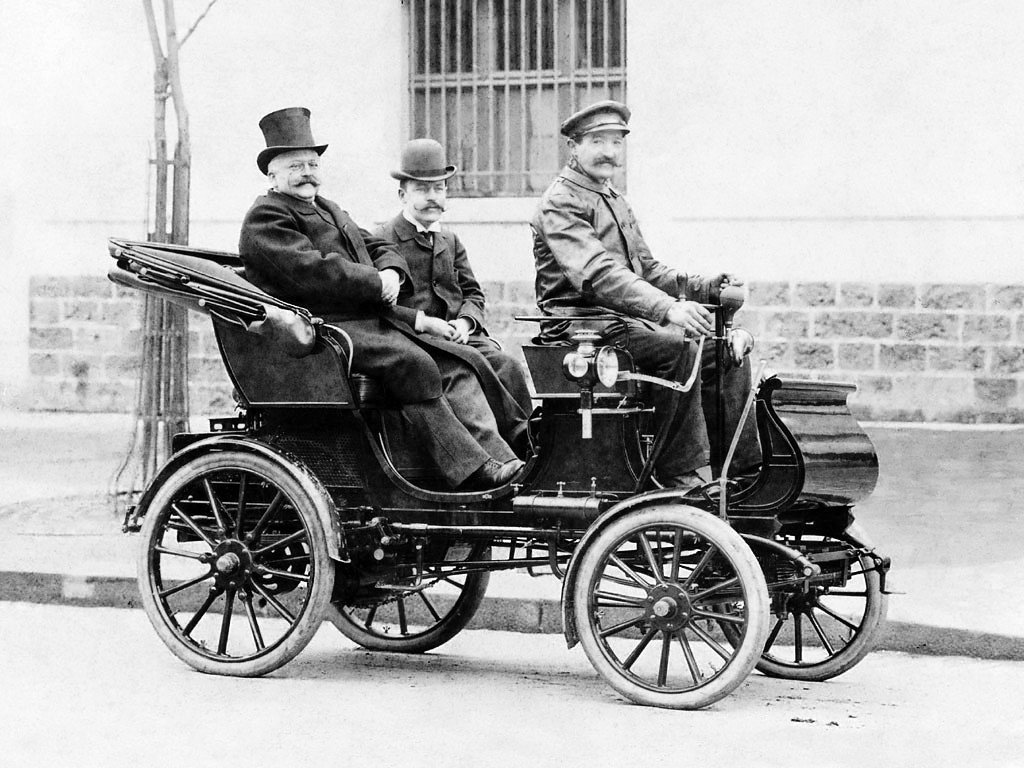

Overview
- Manufacturer: Peugeot
- Production: 1899 – 1901

Body and chassis
- Class: mid-size car
- Layout: RR layout

Dimensions
- Wheelbase: 1,750 mm (68.9 in)
- Length: 2,700 mm (106.3 in)

The Peugeot Type 28 is an early motor vehicle produced between 1899 and 1900 by the French auto-maker Peugeot at their Audincourt plant. Only 8 were produced.

The vehicle was powered by a rear-mounted 1012 cc two cylinder four stroke engine, manufactured by Peugeot themselves. The engine's two cylinders were mounted in parallel and not in the V-format used for the company's first petrol engined vehicles. The mechanical approach and layout were similar to that used on the Peugeot Type 26. The engine was mounted behind the driver and his (or, at least in principle, her) passengers above the rear axle. A maximum output of 12 hp (8.9 kW) was delivered to the rear wheels via a chain-drive mechanism. A maximum speed of 35 km/h (22 mph) was claimed.

The car had much in common with the manufacturer’s more popular Type 26, introduced the same year, but the Type 28 was larger. A wheelbase of 1,750 mm (68.9 in) supported a vehicle length of 2,700 mm (106.3 in). The car featured an open-carriage format “phaeton” body designed to accommodate four people.

The Peugeot Type 28 was only produced until 1901.

== Sources and further reading ==
- Wolfgang Schmarbeck: Alle Peugeot Automobile 1890-1990. Motorbuch-Verlag. Stuttgart 1990. ISBN 3-613-01351-7
