= Peugeot Type 25 =

Overview
- Manufacturer: Peugeot
- Production: 1898

Body and chassis
- Class: mid-sized car
- Layout: RR layout

The Peugeot Type 25 is an early motor car produced by the French auto-maker Peugeot at their Audincourt plant and listed between 1898 and 1902. Only 2 were produced, probably both in 1898.

Peugeots had previously been powered by Daimler designed engines, but the Type 25 was propelled using Peugeot's own newly developed parallel-twin-cylinder four stroke engine, mounted underneath and behind the driver. A maximum of between 6 and 7 hp of power was delivered to the rear wheels by means of a chain-drive mechanism.

The car was closely related to the commercially far more successful Type15, but at 2800 mm it was longer, with a 1900 mm wheelbase. The carriage style coupé de ville body provided space for three, with a single seat at the front for the driver and a two-person bench seat positioned between the driver and the engine.

== Sources and further reading ==
- Wolfgang Schmarbeck: Alle Peugeot Automobile 1890-1990. Motorbuch-Verlag. Stuttgart 1990. ISBN 3-613-01351-7
