= Peugeot Type 36 =

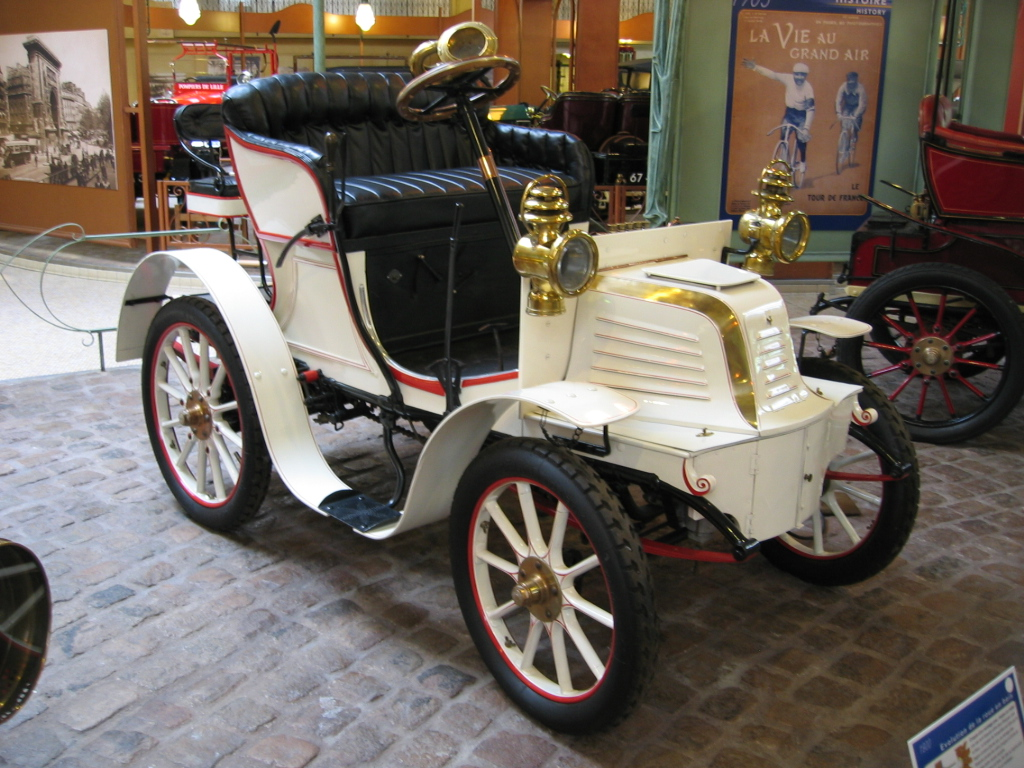

Overview
- Manufacturer: S. A. des Automobiles Peugeot
- Production: 1901–1902; 111 produced

Body and chassis
- Body style: Spyder
- Layout: RR layout

Powertrain
- Engine: 642 cc single-cylinder engine

Chronology
- Predecessor: Peugeot Type 33
- Successor: Peugeot Type 63

The Peugeot Type 36 was a new model from Peugeot made in 1901 and 1902. It was the first Peugeot to feature a steering wheel rather than a tiller. The Type 48 also used a newly developed upright single-cylinder made by Peugeot. On this vehicle, the engine was available in four states of tune, offering between 5 and 8 bhp.

Bodies were made only to order giving rise to an average customer waiting time of 10 months after placing an order.

In 1900 France was the world's leading auto producer, building 4,800 cars in that year alone of which Peugeot accounted for 500.
