= Peugeot Type 30 =

Overview
- Manufacturer: Peugeot
- Production: 1900–1902

Body and chassis
- Class: small car
- Layout: RR layout

Dimensions
- Wheelbase: 1,650 mm (65 in)
- Length: 2,600 mm (102.4 in)

The Peugeot Type 30 is an early motor vehicle produced between 1900 and 1902 by the French auto-maker Peugeot at their Audincourt plant. 84 were produced.

The vehicle was powered by a rear-mounted four-stroke engine, manufactured by Peugeot themselves. The engine's two cylinders were mounted in parallel and not in the V-format used for the company's first petrol-engined vehicle. The engine was mounted behind the driver and his (or, at least in principle, her) passenger above the rear axle. A maximum output of between 3 and 5 hp (4 kW) was delivered to the rear wheels via a chain-drive mechanism.

The car was in effect an open-topped development of the manufacturer’s Type 21, introduced two years earlier. A wheelbase of 1,650 mm (65.0 in) supported a vehicle length of 2,600 mm (102.4 in), on which sat an open-carriage format “Victoriette” body designed to accommodate three people.

== Sources and further reading ==
- Wolfgang Schmarbeck: Alle Peugeot Automobile 1890–1990. Motorbuch-Verlag. Stuttgart 1990. ISBN 3-613-01351-7
