= Peugeot Type 48 =

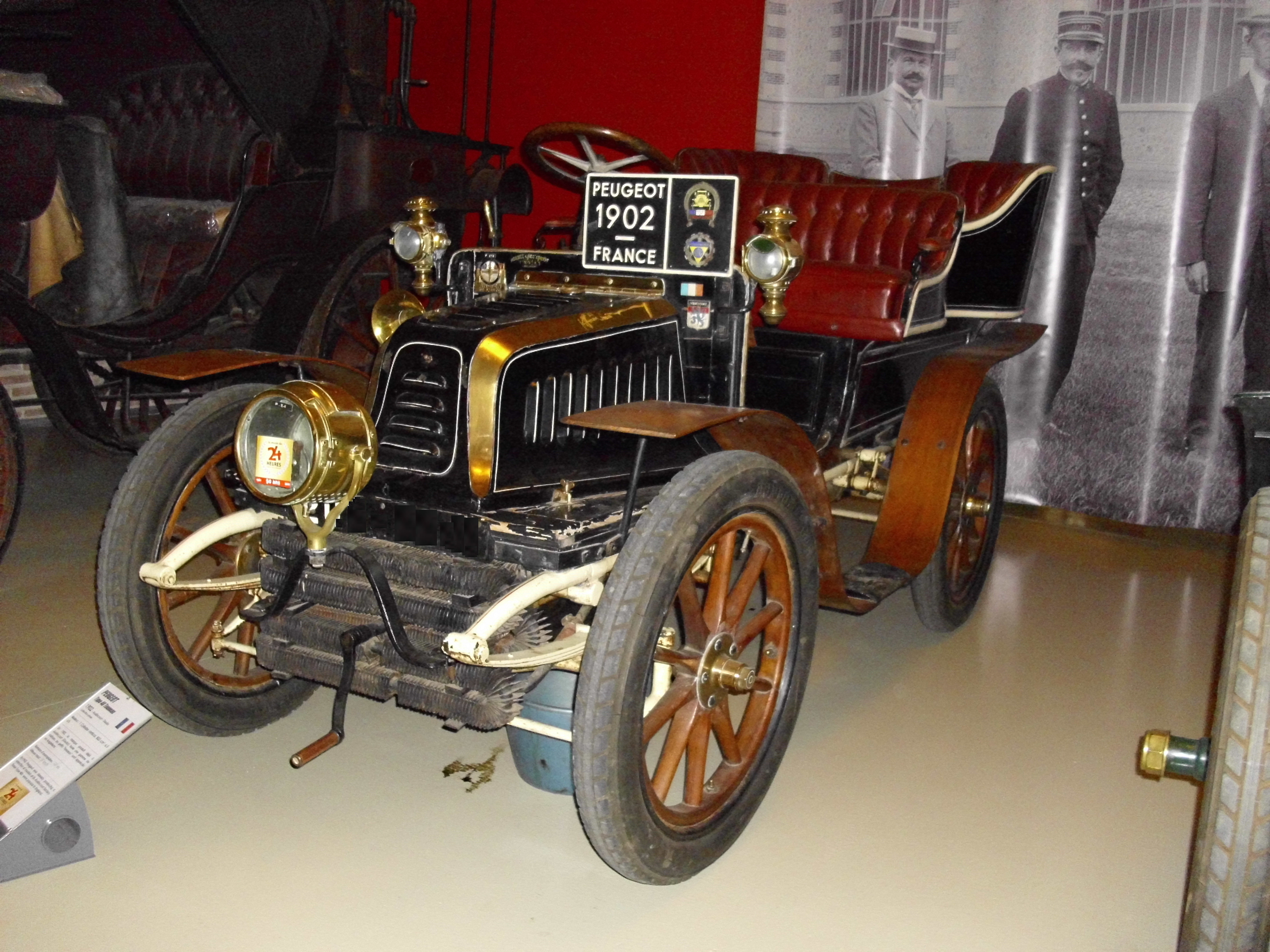

Overview
- Manufacturer: Peugeot
- Production: 1902 – 1909

Body and chassis
- Class: small car
- Layout: FR layout

Dimensions
- Wheelbase: 1,700 mm (66.9 in)
- Length: 2,900 mm (114.2 in)

The Peugeot Type 48 is an early motor vehicle produced between 1902 and 1909 by the French auto-maker Peugeot at their Audincourt plant. It was a small and (relatively) inexpensive open bodied four seater.

The vehicle was powered by a single-cylinder 833 cc four stroke engine. An innovation at the time was the use of a steel rotating drive shaft to deliver the power to the rear wheels in place of the Chain-drive mechanism that Peugeot had previously used. Replacing the drive chain with a drive shaft enabled the manufacturer to move the engine from its accustomed place behind the driver, and it was now positioned at the front of the car. 6.5 hp (5 kW) was the claimed maximum power output, achieved at 1200 rpm.

The 2,900 mm (114.2 in) long car sat on a wheel-base of just 1,700 mm (66.9 in). The open bodied Tonneau / Phaeton format body was built around a frame of tubular steel and offered space for four people.

The Type 48 remained in production until 1909 by which year it had achieved the longest production run of any Peugeot model. 131 had been produced.

== Sources and further reading ==
- Wolfgang Schmarbeck: Alle Peugeot Automobile 1890-1990. Motorbuch-Verlag. Stuttgart 1990. ISBN 3-613-01351-7
