= Peugeot 20Cup =

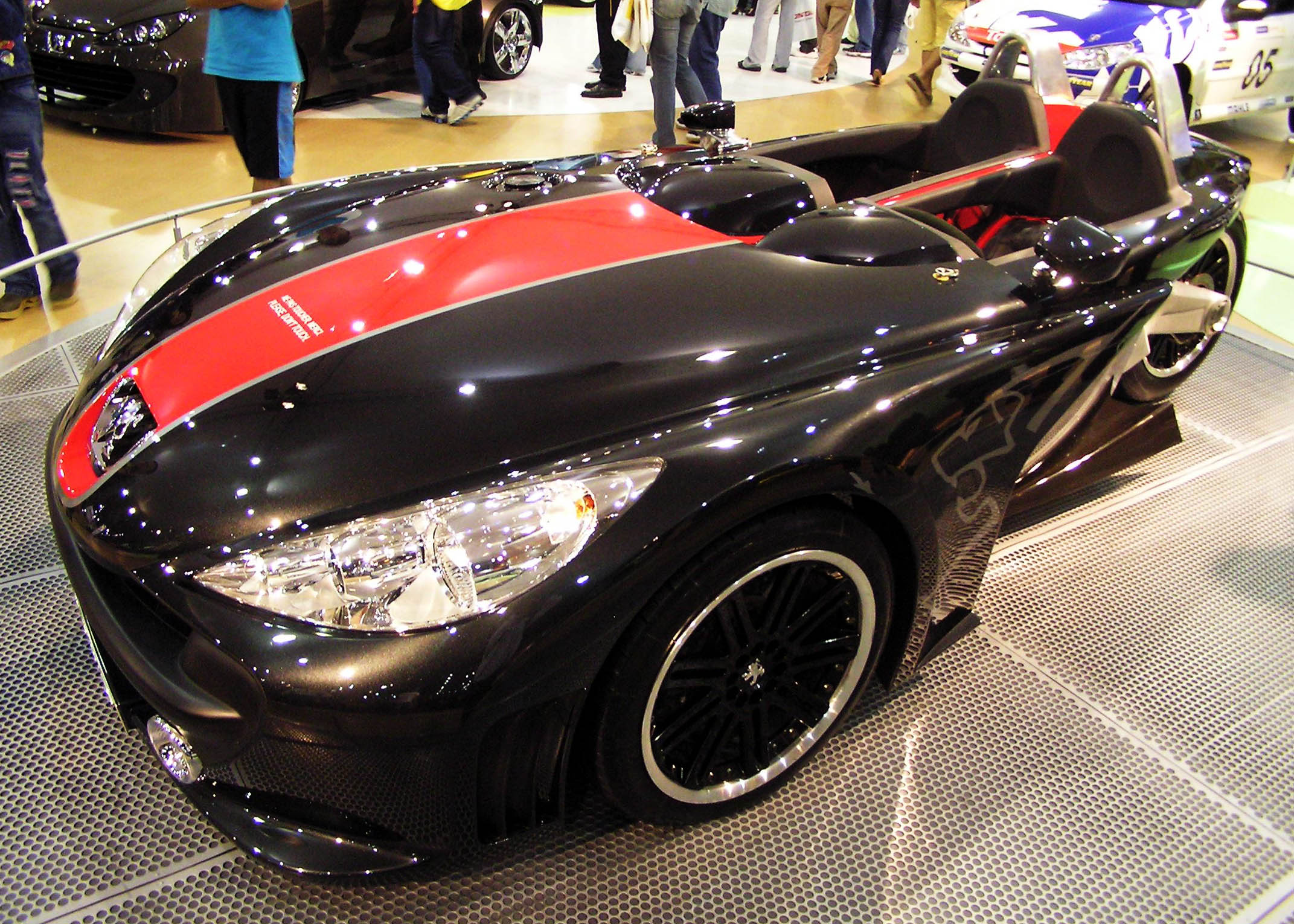

Overview
- Manufacturer: Peugeot
- Production: 2005

Body and chassis
- Class: Concept Sports car(S)
- Body style: 0-door speedster
- Layout: Front engine, Front-wheel drive

Powertrain
- Engine: 1.6L Prince turbocharged I4
- Transmission: 6-speed Sequential Paddle manual

Dimensions
- Wheelbase: 2.31 m (7 ft 6.9 in)
- Length: 3.63 m (11.9 ft)
- Width: 1.77 m (5 ft 9.7 in)
- Height: 1.16 m (3 ft 9.7 in)
- Curb weight: 500 kg (1,102.3 lb)

The Peugeot 20Cup is a reverse trike concept car using the "tadpole" set-up, built in 2005. Made from a carbon-fibre structure, it integrated a two-seater cockpit and a front end from the Peugeot 207 with a motorcycle rear.

== Engine ==
The purpose-built 1.6 litre engine was manufactured in a collaboration between BMW and PSA. The turbo-charged, four-cylinder, sixteen valve petrol engine generates a maximum power of 170 bhp (127 kW)

== Design ==
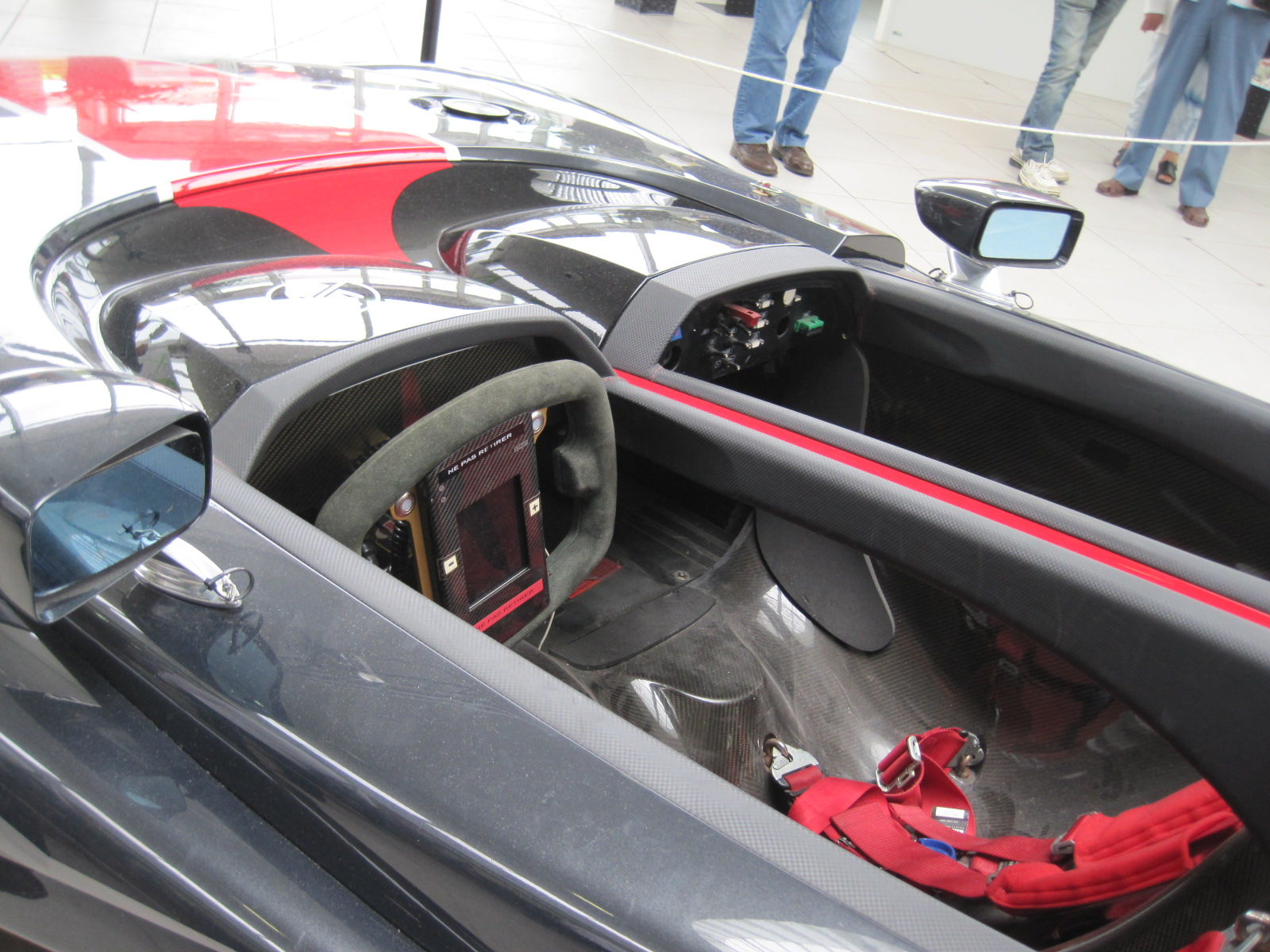
Interior

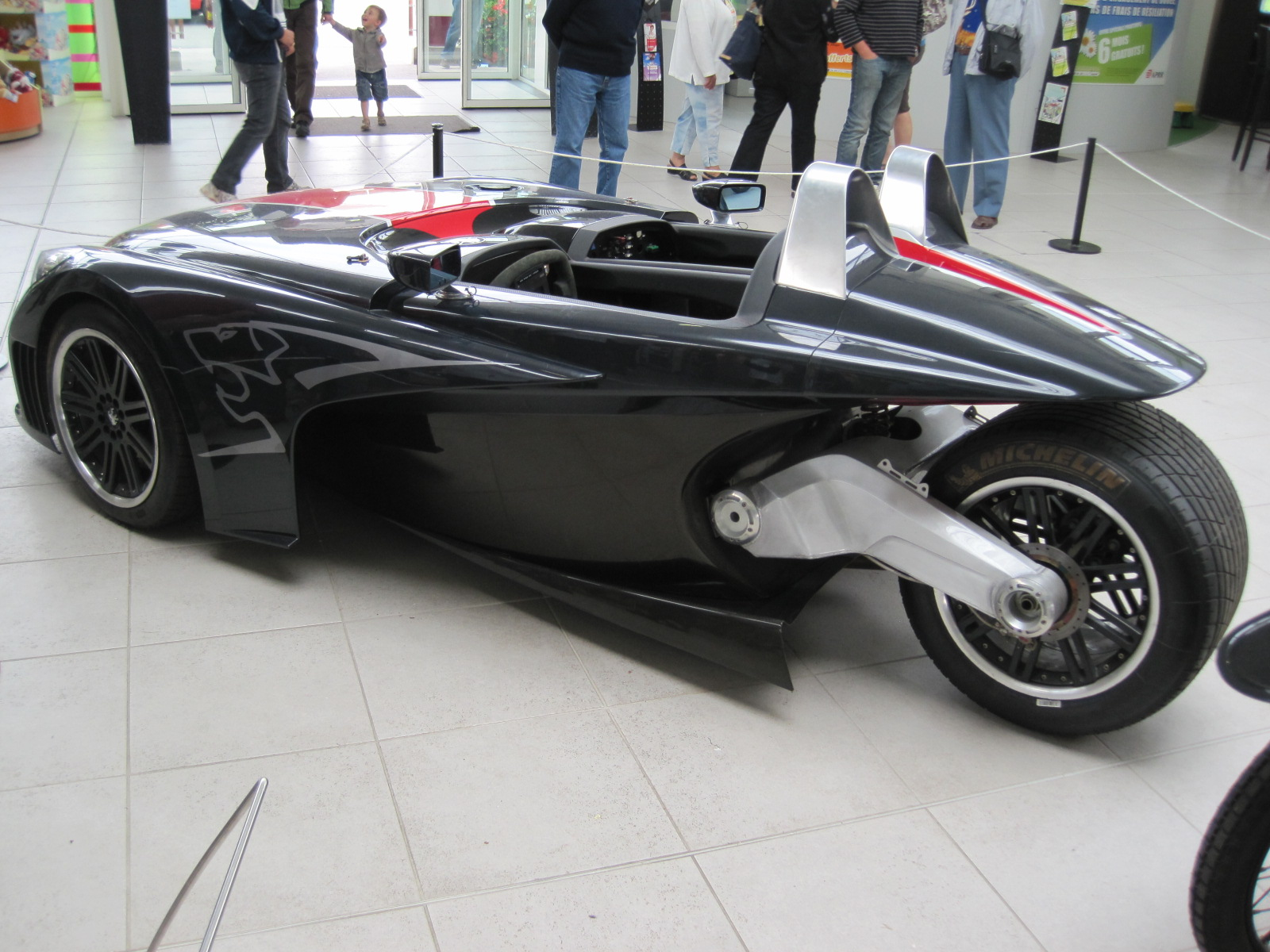
Rear view

The reverse-trike design, also known as the "tadpole" format
