= Peugeot Type 81 =

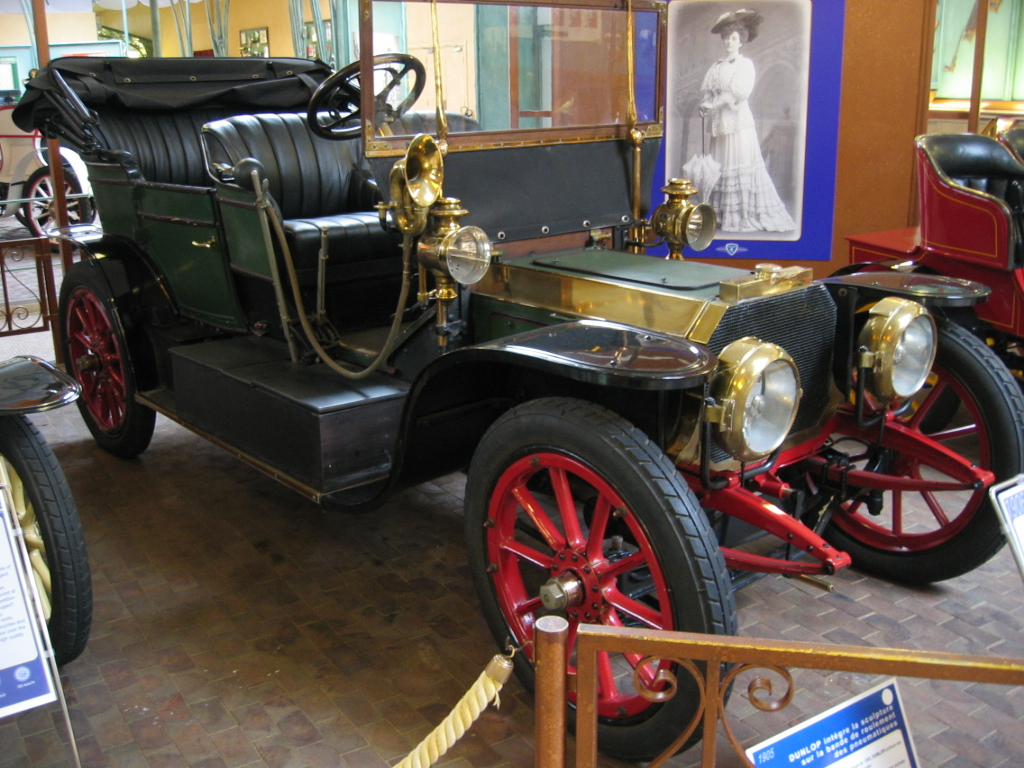

Overview
- Manufacturer: Peugeot
- Production: 1906; 251 produced

Body and chassis
- Class: Full-size
- Layout: FR layout

Powertrain
- Engine: 2207 cc (135 cid) straight-4

Dimensions
- Wheelbase: 109.4 inches (2,780 mm)
- Length: 150.4 inches (3,820 mm)

Chronology
- Predecessor: None
- Successor: Peugeot Type 71

The Peugeot Type 81 was a fairly large car, and with among the largest units of any contemporary Peugeot model, a correspondingly large production effort of the time. Available as a closed top limousine or a double phaeton, 251 Type 81s were built during 1906. The engine was a 2.2 L straight-4 which produced 15 hp at 1400 rpm.
