= Peugeot Type 24 =

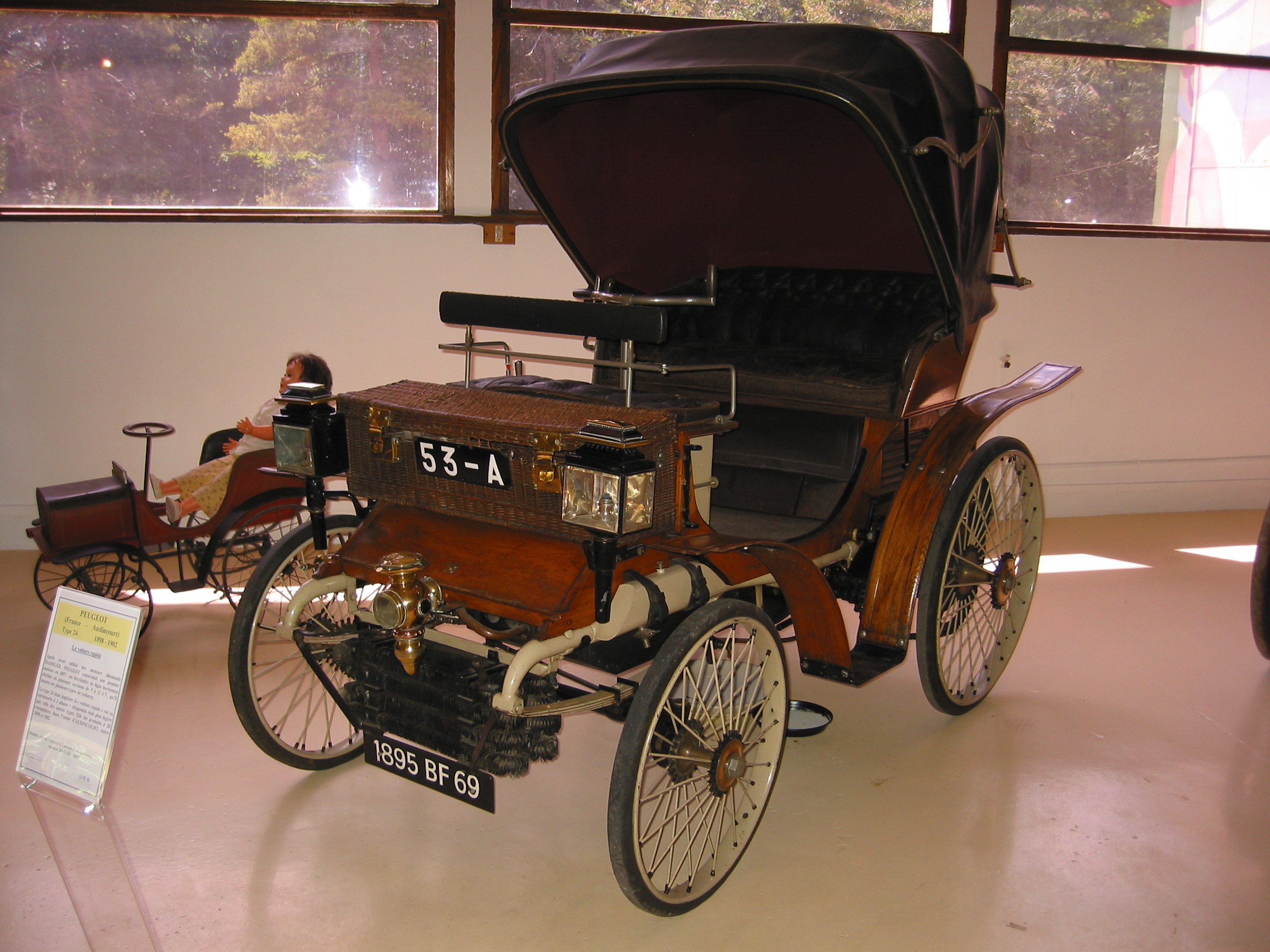

Overview
- Manufacturer: Peugeot
- Production: 1898–1902

Body and chassis
- Class: small car
- Layout: RR layout

Dimensions
- Wheelbase: 1,380 mm (54.3 in)
- Length: 2,250 mm (88.6 in)

The Peugeot Type 24 is an early motor vehicle produced between 1898 and 1901 by the French auto-maker Peugeot at their Audincourt plant. Twenty were produced.

The vehicle was powered by a rear-mounted four stroke engine, manufactured by Peugeot themselves. The engine's two cylinders were mounted in parallel and not in the V-format used for the company's first petrol engined vehicle. The engine was mounted behind the driver and his (or, at least in principle, her) passenger above the rear axle. A maximum output of between 10 and 12 hp (9 kW) was delivered to the rear wheels via a chain-drive mechanism.

A wheelbase of 1,380 mm (54.3 in) supported a vehicle length of 2,250 mm (88.6 in), with an open fronted carriage format body designed to accommodate two people, albeit with limited space for a third in an emergency.

A similar but longer vehicle with space for four, the Peugeot Type 21, was introduced in the same year. Two years later, in 1900, the company introduced the Peugeot Type 31 which was a variation on the same theme, but a little shorter than the Type 24.

== Sources and further reading ==
- Wolfgang Schmarbeck: Alle Peugeot Automobile 1890-1990. Motorbuch-Verlag. Stuttgart 1990. ISBN 3-613-01351-7
