= Peugeot Type 16 =

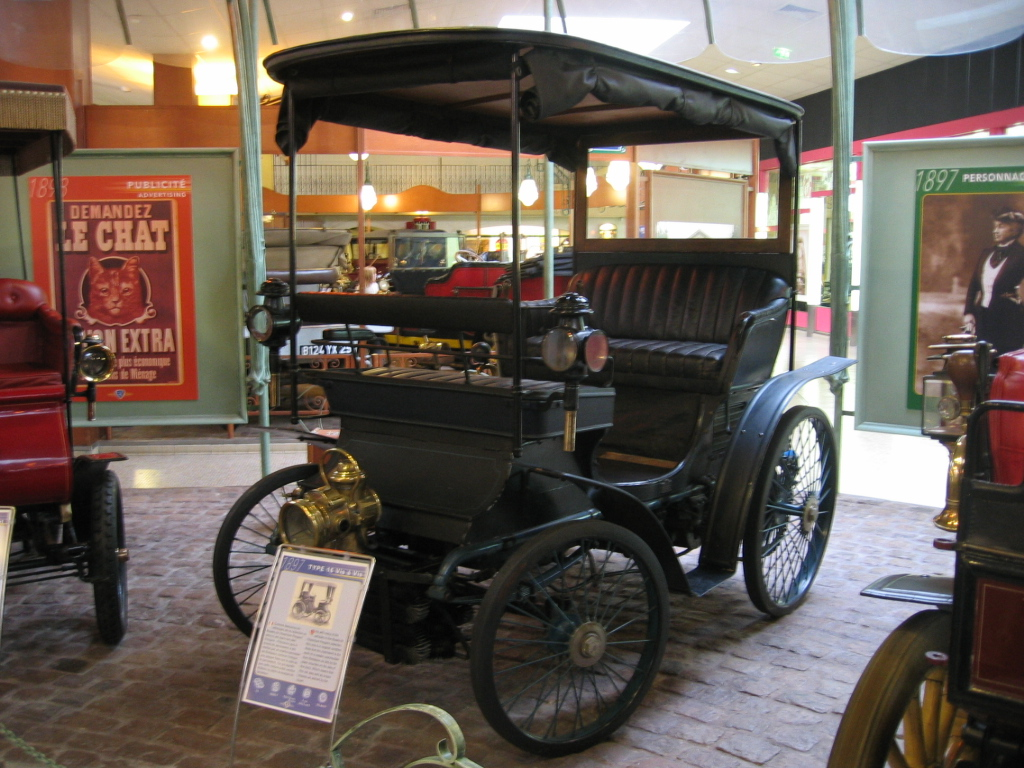

Overview
- Manufacturer: Peugeot
- Production: 1897–1900; 87 produced

Body and chassis
- Class: Family car
- Layout: FR layout

Powertrain
- Engine: 2423 cc

Dimensions
- Wheelbase: 1,650 millimetres (65 in)

Chronology
- Predecessor: Peugeot Type 12
- Successor: Peugeot Type 17

The Peugeot Type 16 was a mid-size family car produced by French automaker Peugeot from 1897 to 1900. The flat-twin engine was of the same series produced in the contemporaneous Peugeot Type 15, though the engine in the heavier Type 16 was enlarged to 2.4 L. During the production run, the Type 16 (a 4-seater vis-à-vis) was joined in its class by the smaller Peugeot Type 17, the similar Type 19, and the larger Type 32. A total of 87 Type 16s were built.
