= Peugeot Type 175 =

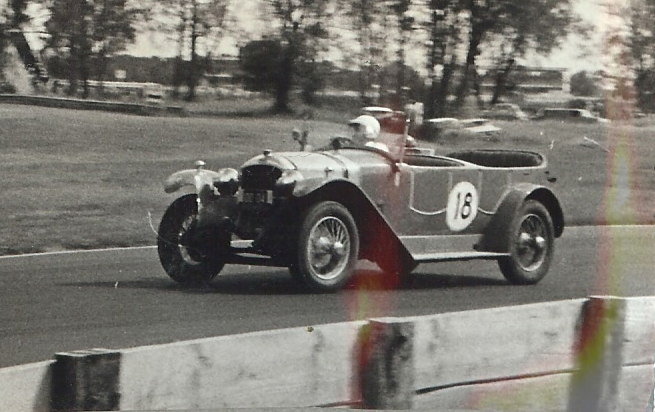
- Racing Peugeot type 175 1923 when in Australia

Overview
- Manufacturer: Peugeot
- Production: 1923–1924; 303 produced

Body and chassis
- Body style: Torpedo Sport
- Layout: FR layout

Powertrain
- Engine: 2951 cc LA5 OHV I4

Dimensions
- Wheelbase: 3,090 millimetres (121.7 in)
- Length: 4,200 millimetres (165.4 in)

Chronology
- Predecessor: Peugeot Type 138
- Successor: Peugeot Type 176

The Peugeot Type 175 was a fairly large sports car from Peugeot produced in 1923 and 1924. This model was produced at the factory in Audincourt. The OHV engine, of the LA5 range, displaced 3.0 L (2951 cc, 180 cid) and has a 4 speed gearbox. It was only available with the "torpedo sport" or "torpedo grand sport" body at the price of 38,000 old Francs. Colours offered were blue, grey, green or red, with black wings and chassis. The body was made of a wooden frame with steel; the bonnet was made of aluminium with a sloping, nickel-plated window. Blériot headlights and a 12V SEV magneto and starter were fitted. In 1924, H. Petit won the 3-litre category of the 1100 km Paris-Nice race in this model: The "Paris Nice" Peugeot 175 Torpedo Grand Sport

A total of only 303 were made and only 4 original and complete surviving cars are known today (3 in France and 1 type 175 in Belgium). One of these cars is exhibited in the Musée de l'Aventure Peugeot. Besides these, a complete chassis with all the mechanics survived in New Zealand and also a fast looking modified "special" in France with a non original engine.

== Gallery ==
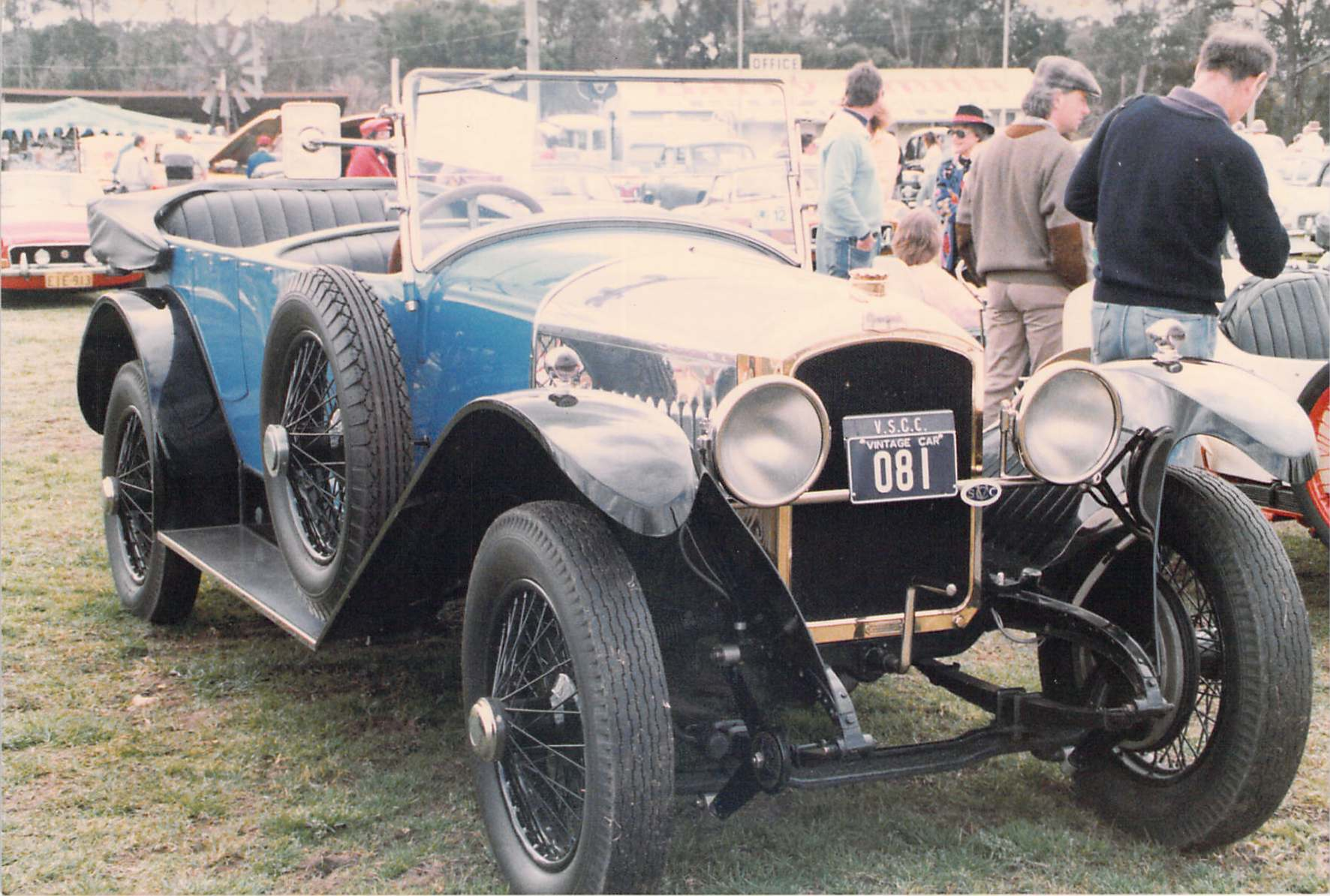
Peugeot 175 (Ex Australia and now in France)

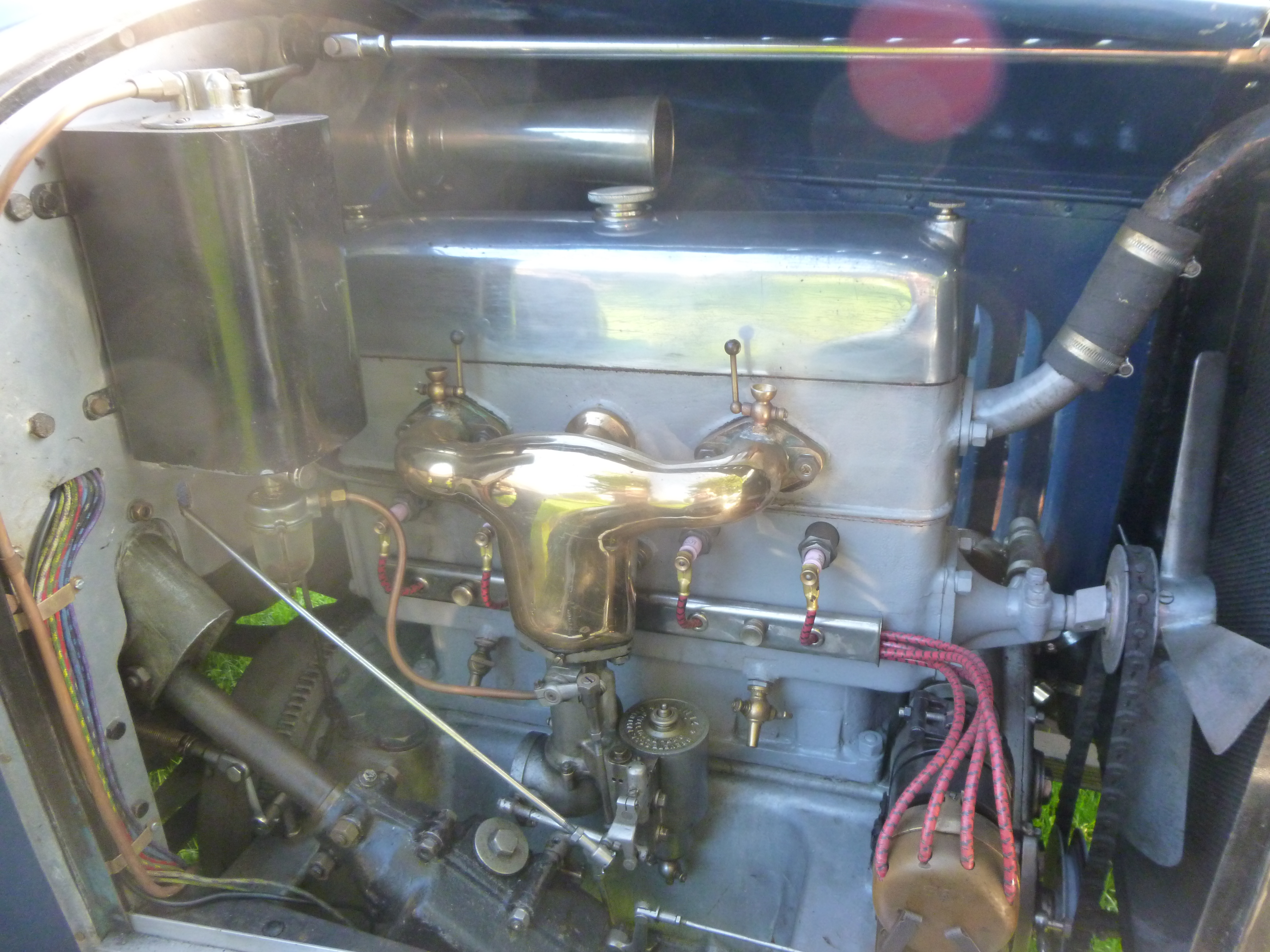
Engine 3L OHV Peugeot 175 1923 (Belgium)

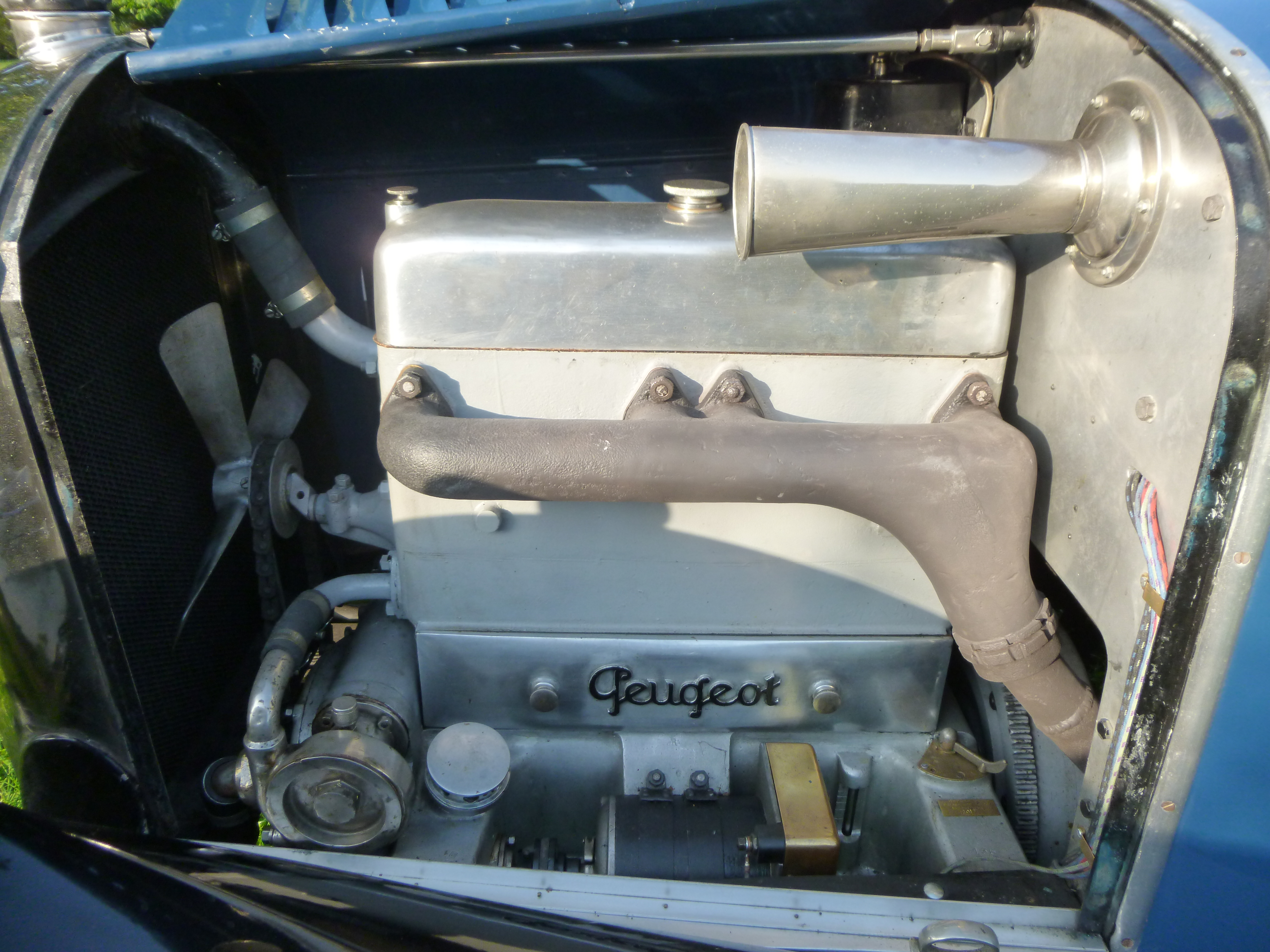
Engine 3L OHV Peugeot 175 1923 (Belgium)

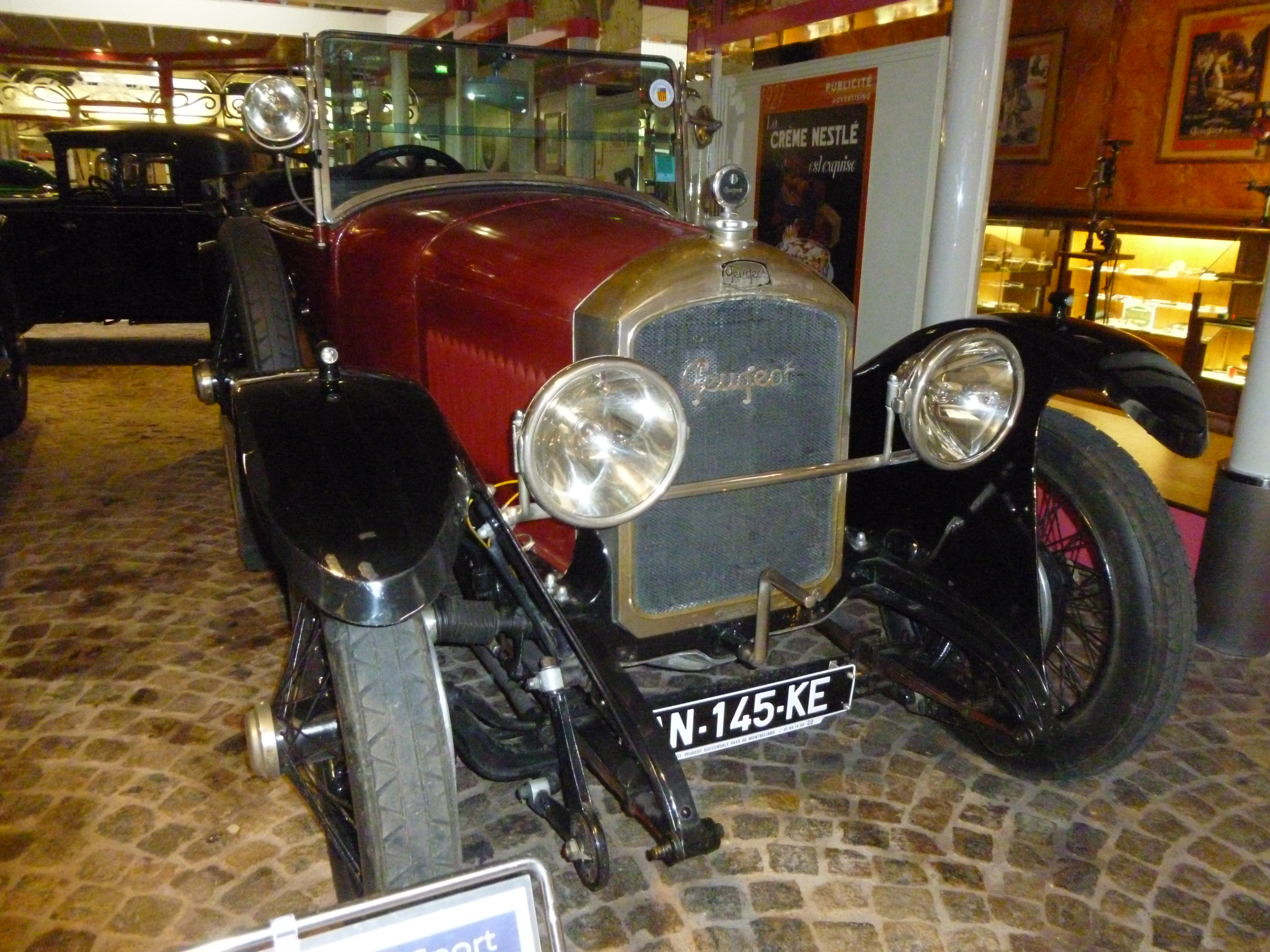
Peugeot 175 de Musée de l'Aventure Peugeot (Ex Tasmania)

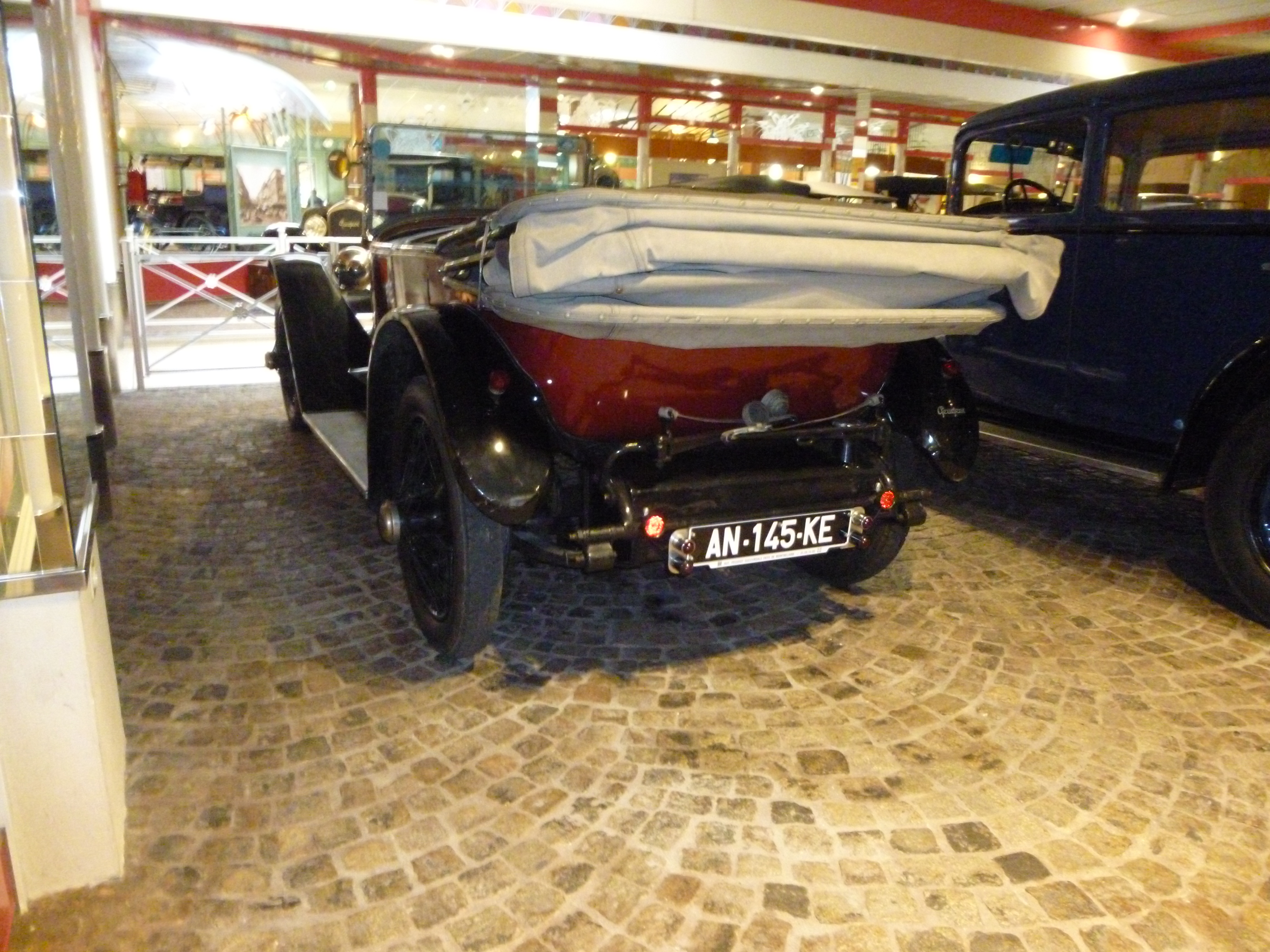
Peugeot 175 de Musée de l'Aventure Peugeot (Ex Tasmania)

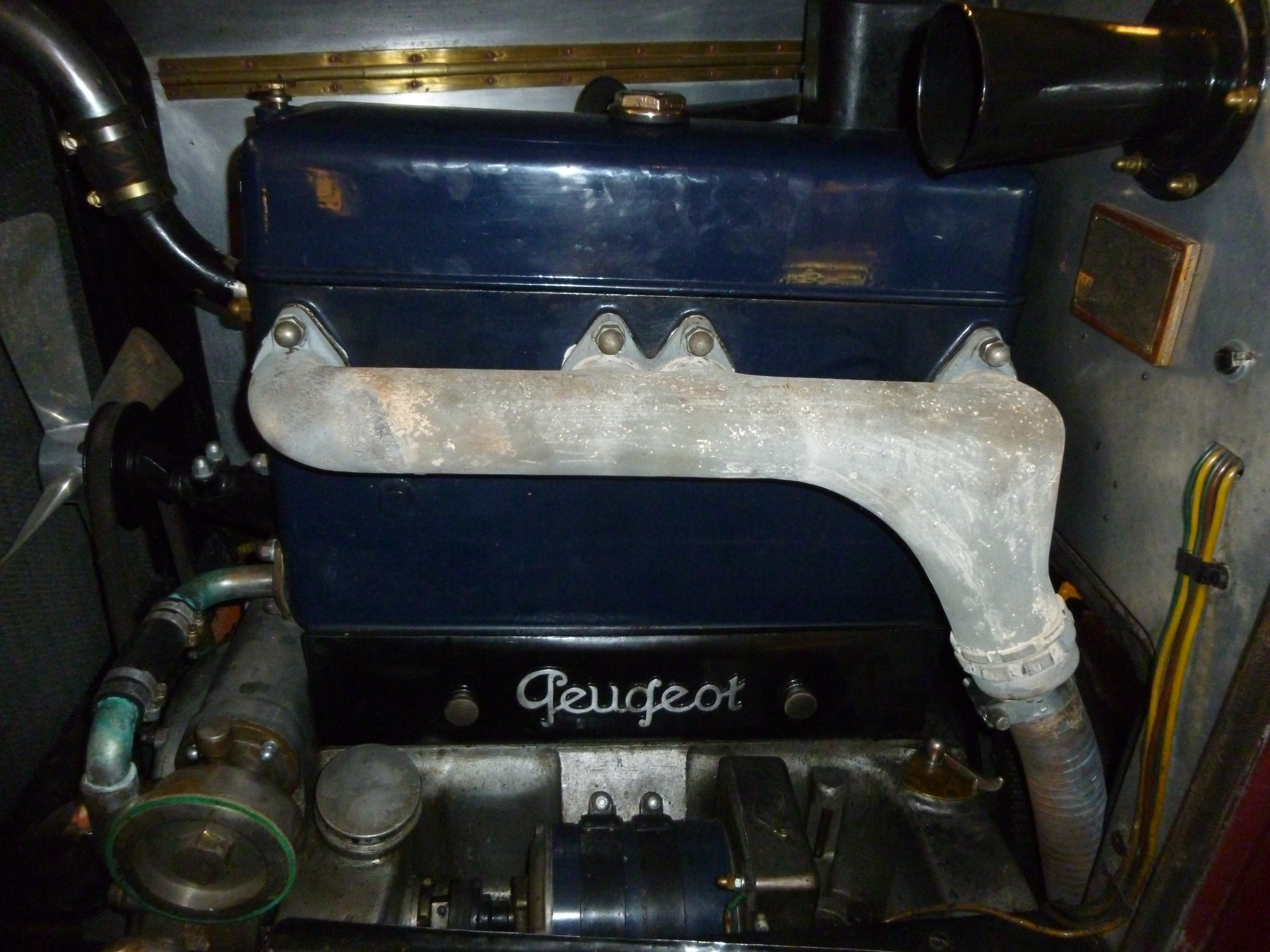
Peugeot 175 de Musée de l'Aventure Peugeot (Ex Tasmania)
