= Peugeot Velv =

Overview
- Manufacturer: Peugeot
- Production: 2011

Body and chassis
- Class: Concept car
- Body style: 2-door three-wheeler

Dimensions
- Length: 2,810 mm (110.6 in)

The Peugeot Velv (Véhicule électrique Léger de Ville) is a concept lightweight urban electric vehicle presented in Paris on 26 September 2011.

== Overview ==
The Velv's very short rear axle makes it closer to being a Three-wheeler. It is a three-seater with overall length of 2.81 m. The electric motor generates output of 32 hp (20 kW), for a top speed of 110 km/h. Cruising range is 100 kilometers with 8.5 kWh battery capacity.
