= Peugeot Type 68 =

Overview
- Manufacturer: Peugeot
- Production: 1905

Body and chassis
- Class: mid-sized car
- Layout: FR layout

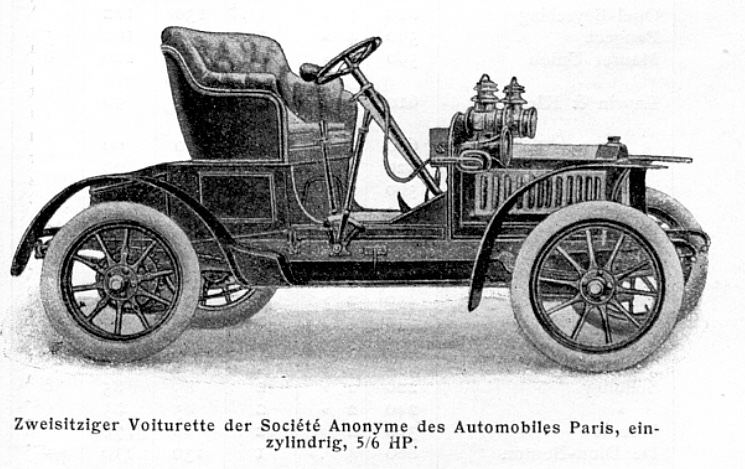
Peugeot Type 68 (1905).

The Peugeot Type 68 is an early motor car that the French auto-maker Peugeot produced at their Audincourt plant during 1905. 276 were produced.

Three different version of the Type 68 were listed. A single-cylinder 883 cc four-stroke engine, mounted ahead of the driver, propelled the Type 68A and Type 68B. The rear wheels received a maximum of 8 hp via a rotating drive-shaft. The Type 68C was similarly powered except that the single-cylinder engine had a capacity of 987 cc.

The car had a 2,000 mm (78.7 in) wheelbase. The open carriage Tonneau format body offered space for four as did the covered carriage format Phaeton / Torpedo bodied version. In retrospect the car can be seen as Peugeot’s first Torpedo bodied car, although the classification is anachronistic since the term “Torpedo” to describe a car body was coined only in 1908. Buyers opting for the larger engined Type 68C had the chance to specify a racing car body.

== Sources and further reading ==
- Wolfgang Schmarbeck: Alle Peugeot Automobile 1890-1990. Motorbuch-Verlag. Stuttgart 1990. ISBN 3-613-01351-7
