= Peugeot Type 105 =

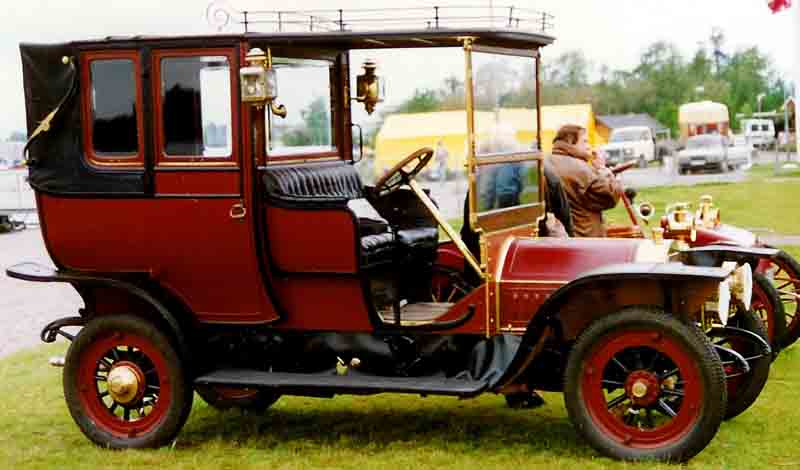

Overview
- Manufacturer: S. A. des Automobiles Peugeot
- Production: 1908–1909; 23 produced

Body and chassis
- Body style: Full-size limousine
- Layout: FR layout

Powertrain
- Engine: 11.1 L I6

Chronology
- Predecessor: Peugeot Type 95

The Peugeot Type 105 was a large vehicle unveiled by Peugeot in 1908. The available body styles included double phaéton, landaulet, limousine, and sport. However, most were built as closed-top limousines. Total production lasted less than two years and saw the production of 23 units. Low production numbers and many available styles ensured almost complete uniqueness of each Type 105.

== Performance ==
The engine was the first from Peugeot with six cylinders — an enormous 11.1 L straight-6 which produced a not inconsiderable 60 horsepower (45 kW), more powerful than the contemporary Rolls-Royce Silver Ghost and virtually all other vehicles on the market at the time. Despite the vehicle's bulk, its engine rendered it capable of more than 100 kilometres per hour (62 mph), a likewise stellar figure for the time.
