= Peugeot Type 33 =

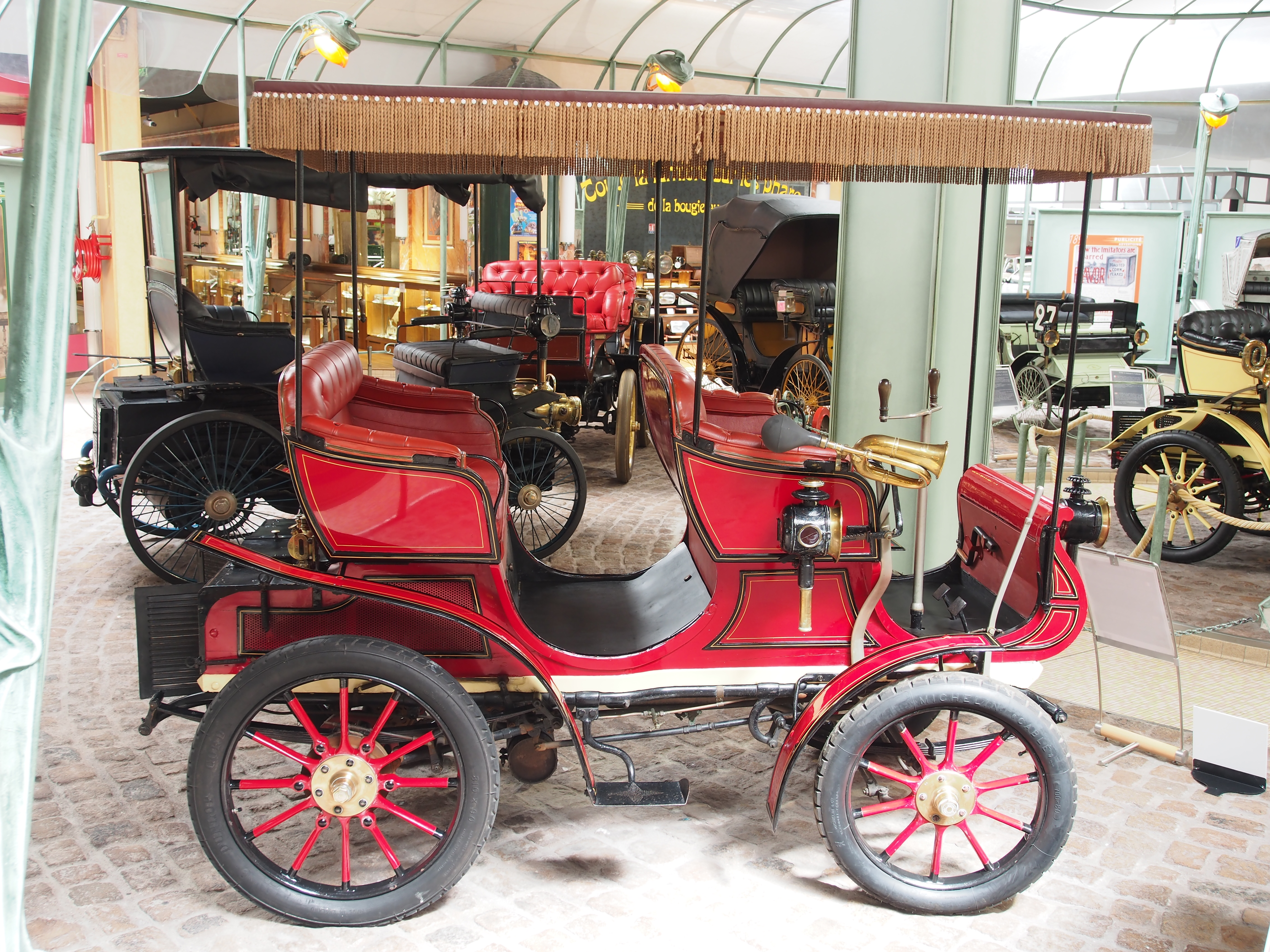

Overview
- Manufacturer: S. A. des Automobiles Peugeot
- Production: 1901–1902; 84 produced

Body and chassis
- Body style: Phaeton
- Layout: RR layout

Powertrain
- Engine: 1.1 L V-twin

Dimensions
- Wheelbase: 1.65 metres (65 in)
- Length: 2.60 metres (102 in)
- Height: 1.58 metres (62 in)

Chronology
- Predecessor: None
- Successor: Peugeot Type 63

The Peugeot Type 33 was a small four-seater phaeton produced in 1901 and 1902. Peugeot's by-now familiar V-twin engine displaced 1056 cc. A total of 84 were made.
