= Peugeot Type 99 =

Overview
- Manufacturer: Peugeot
- Production: 1907

Body and chassis
- Class: mid-sized car
- Layout: FR layout

The Peugeot Type 99 is a motor car produced by the French auto-maker Peugeot at their Audincourt plant in 1907. 324 were produced.

The car had much in common with the company’s Type 63 from 1904, sharing its 2100 mm wheelbase with the shorter “63A” version of that car. The principal difference was the engine which on the Type 99 was a single cylinder unit of 1039 cc delivering a maximum of 9 hp (7 kW). The position of the engine, ahead of the driver, followed what had by now become the Peugeot standard lay-out as did the transmission of power to the rear wheels by means of a rotating steel drive shaft.

The “Double Phaeton” body format offered space for four.

== Sources and further reading ==
- Wolfgang Schmarbeck: Alle Peugeot Automobile 1890-1990. Motorbuch-Verlag. Stuttgart 1990. ISBN 3-613-01351-7
