= Peugeot Type 66 =

Overview
- Manufacturer: Peugeot
- Production: 1904; 20 produced

Body and chassis
- Class: Full-size
- Layout: FR layout

Powertrain
- Engine: 5.0 L I4

Dimensions
- Wheelbase: 106.3 inches (2,700 mm)
- Length: 157.5 inches (4,000 mm)

Chronology
- Successor: Peugeot Type 76

The Peugeot Type 66 was the first large car from French automaker Peugeot, as well as the first vehicle from that manufacturer to have four cylinders. Most were made as closed-top limousines. The engine displaced 5.0 L (4974 cc) and produced 25 horsepower (19 kW), which was sufficient to carry the car to a top speed of 87 kilometres per hour (54 mph). Production ran throughout 1904 and a total of 20 were built.
