= Peugeot Type 173 =

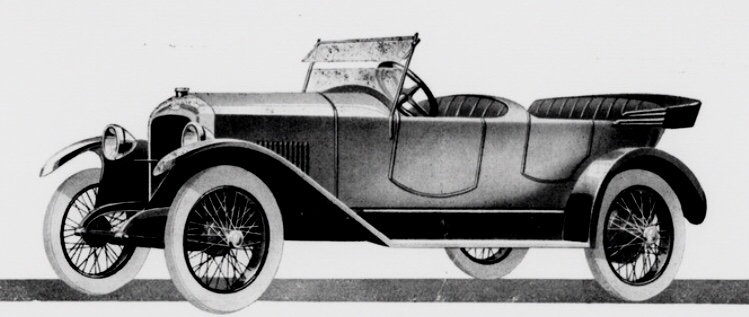
- Peugeot Type 173S in 1923.

Overview
- Manufacturer: Peugeot
- Production: 1922–1925

Body and chassis
- Class: mid-range car
- Layout: FR layout

Dimensions
- Wheelbase: 2,670 mm (105.1 in)
- Length: 4,000 mm (157.5 in)

Chronology
- Successor: Peugeot Type 177

The Peugeot Type 173 is a mid-range car produced between 1922 and 1925 by the French auto-maker Peugeot at their Beaulieu plant. It replaced the company's celebrated Type 163 which itself had done much to revive the company's fortunes in the difficult years directly following the First World War.

Many of the car's technical features were highly innovative at the time. The 173's newly developed inline four-cylinder four-stroke 1,525 cc engine was the first Peugeot unit to feature overhead valve gear. Its position was ahead of the driver and it powered the rear wheels via a four-speed gear box at a time when competitor manufacturers reserved four-speed gear boxes for far larger and more expensive models. A maximum power output of 29 hp at 1,900 rpm was claimed. The modern engine/gear-box combination allowed for relatively brisk acceleration and a claimed maximum speed of 75 km/h (47 mph). The braking system on the Type 173 was correspondingly modern, with drum brakes fitted on both axles while Peugeot's rivals were content to fit brakes only on the rear axle.

There was only one version, designated the 173 S. The car was more generously proportioned than others in the class, which permitted it to offer an unusually spacious interior. A 2670 mm wheelbase supported an overall vehicle length of 4000 mm. The “torpedo”, and a “torpedo sport” bodies were both configured to accommodate four large people.

The Peugeot Type 173 was listed by Peugeot for more than three years, but from 1923 the company was already producing and, from 1924, selling the car's successor, and only 1,002 Type 173s were produced. It was replaced by the Peugeot Type 177 which inherited the 173's engine along with several of its other innovative l features, and which would itself be a mainstay of the Peugeot range virtually till the end of the decade.

== Sources and further reading ==
- Wolfgang Schmarbeck: Alle Peugeot Automobile 1890-1990. Motorbuch-Verlag. Stuttgart 1990. ISBN 3-613-01351-7
