= Lion-Peugeot Type VD2 =

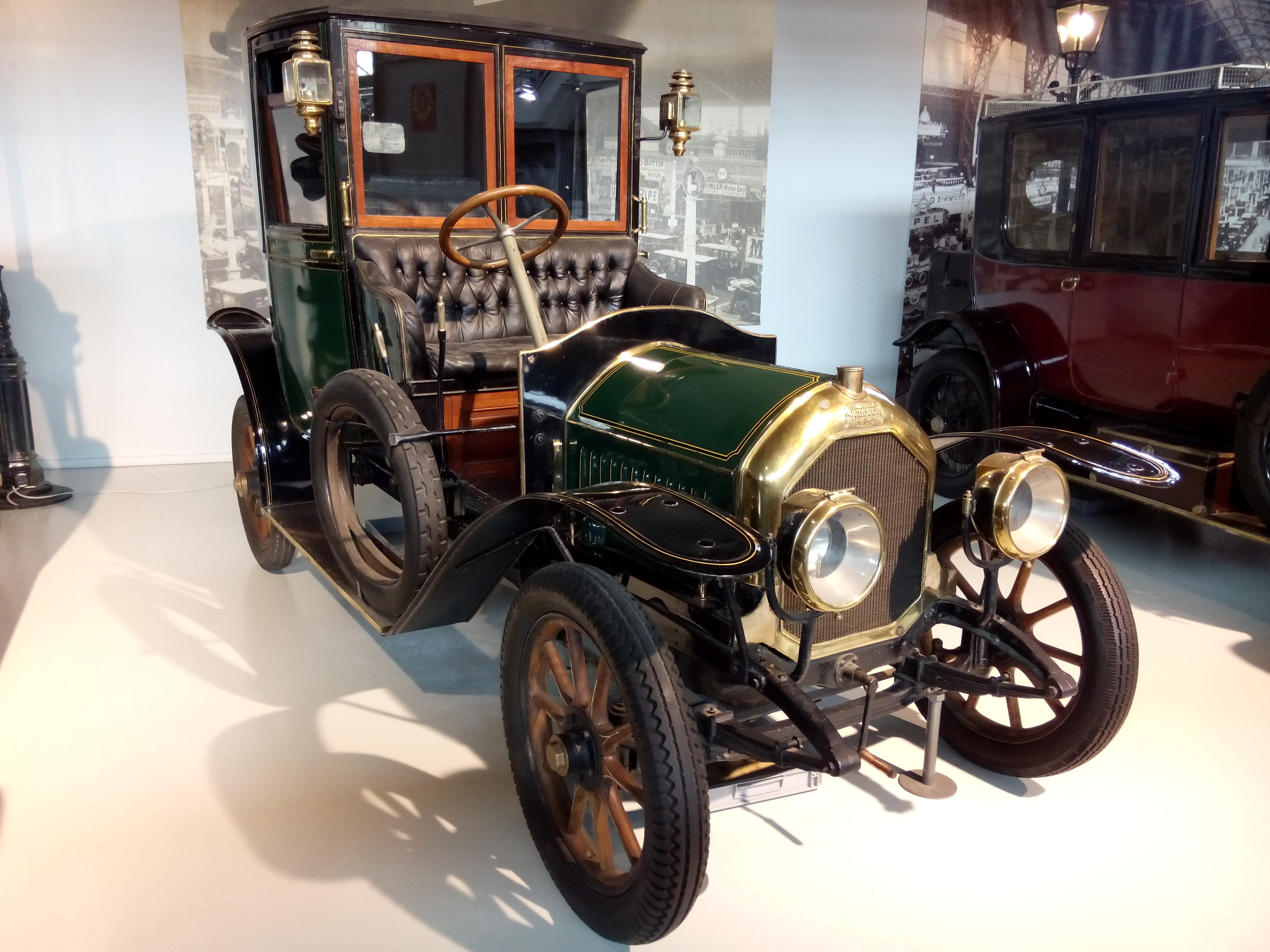

Overview
- Manufacturer: Lion-Peugeot
- Production: 1915

Body and chassis
- Class: small car
- Layout: FR layout

The Lion-Peugeot Type VD2 was a motor car produced near Valentigney by the French auto-maker Lion-Peugeot in 1915. It was usefully longer than the manufacturer's 1914 model, the Type V4D Approximately 480 Lion-Peugeot Type VD2s were produced. It was the last Lion-Peugeot produced before wartime economic conditions enforced the closure of Lion-Peugeot automobile production. Subsequent small Peugeots would be badged simply as Peugeots and produced in plants that had developed during the period, before 1910, when "Automobiles Peugeot" was a separate business.

The Types VD2 was propelled using a four-cylinder 1,888 cm³ four stroke engine, mounted ahead of the driver. A maximum 10 hp of power was delivered to the rear wheels.

The cars also became known as Lion-Peugeot 10 hp models. This was a reference to their fiscal horse power, applying a system of car classification for taxation purposes recently established in France. Tax horsepower then, and for several decades to come, was defined purely as a function of the combined surface area of the engine's cylinders, this being far easier to assess consistently and accurately than the actual power produced by an engine. In 1915 fiscal horse-power still tended to equate approximately to actual horse-power, although the two would diverge subsequently, as engines became more efficient at extracting power from a given sum of cylinder diameters. Eventually, in the second half of the twentieth century, more complex (and less internationally consistent) definitions of fiscal horse power would replace those defined only by cylinder diameters.

The Type VD2 featured a 2,750 mm wheel base. The 4,000 mm (approximately) overall length provided space for four or five people depending on the body specified. The range of available bodies included a Torpedo, a “Landaulet”, a Limousine, and a “central steering” model.

== Lion-Peugeot and Peugeot: the difference ==
“Lion-Peugeot” is the name under which in 1906 Robert Peugeot and his two brothers, independently of their cousin Armand's "Automobiles Peugeot" company, established a car manufacturing business at Beaulieu near Vallentigny. Ten years earlier the automobile pioneer Armand Peugeot had split away from the family business after a long-standing disagreement over how intensively the company should diversify into larger scale automobile production. An agreement had at that time been entered into between Armand's “Automobiles Peugeot” company and the residual Peugeot business that the residual business should concentrate on its established metal tools and components businesses along with its successful bicycle manufacturing activities, while Armand would have Peugeot branded powered vehicles to himself. During the ensuing ten years Armand's automobile business had grown rapidly, although it appears that the residual Peugeot business had probably not entirely avoided producing powered vehicles. In any event, under a new agreement signed in 1905, the residual Peugeot business made Armand an annual payment in return for which Armand consented to the residual business itself producing motor cars under the “Lion-Peugeot” name. The arrangement continued until 1910 after which (the death of Robert Peugeot's father Eugène having apparently removed a major impediment to the idea) the Lion-Peugeot business and the Peugeot automobiles business were merged into a single company. Nevertheless, some smaller models continued to be branded as “Lion-Peugeots” until 1916.
