= Lion-Peugeot Types VY and VY2 =

Lion-Peugeot Type VY Lion-Peugeot Type VY2

Overview
- Manufacturer: Lion-Peugeot
- Production: 1908-1909

Body and chassis
- Class: sports car
- Layout: FR layout

The Lion-Peugeot Type VY and the Lion-Peugeot Type VY2 were early motor cars produced near Valentigney by the French auto-maker Lion-Peugeot between 1908 and 1909.

The Type VY can be seen as the top of the range model in a range which also included the Type VC1 with which it shared its chassis, wheelbase and overall length. However, the VY's single cylinder four stroke engine was of 1,841 cm³ and power delivered to the rear wheels, at 12 hp, was more than 30% greater than on the Type VC. A top speed of "easily 50 km/h" (31 mph) was quoted.

The wheelbase of 2,120 mm, supported a vehicle length of 2,950 mm, providing space for two. Sports or racing car body formats were listed.

Willingness to maximise component standardisation on a relatively wide range of cars reflected an appreciation on the part of the manufacturer of the need to concentrate on making cars easy to produce at reasonable cost, an approach which would resonate down the decades to come, and which does much to explain why Peugeot has survived and grown, whereas most of the major auto-makers familiar in France during the first decade of the twentieth century would disappear within fifty years. Nevertheless, the relatively high price of the Type VY was reflected in the relatively small number of cars produced. 142 were produced, compared with about 1,000 of the slower Types VC and VC1.

== Lion-Peugeot and Peugeot: the difference ==
“Lion-Peugeot” is the name under which in 1906 Robert Peugeot and his two brothers, independently of their cousin Armand’s "Automobiles Peugeot" company, established a car manufacturing business at Beaulieu near Vallentigny. Ten years earlier the automobile pioneer Armand Peugeot had split away from the family business after a long-standing disagreement over how intensively the company should diversify into larger scale automobile production. An agreement had at that time been entered into between Armand’s “Automobiles Peugeot” company and the residual Peugeot business that the residual business should concentrate on its established metal tools and components businesses along with its successful bicycle manufacturing activities, while Armand would have Peugeot branded powered vehicles to himself. During the ensuing ten years Armand’s automobile business had grown rapidly, although it appears that the residual Peugeot business had probably not entirely avoided producing powered vehicles. In any event, under a new agreement signed in 1905, the residual Peugeot business made Armand an annual payment in return for which Armand consented to the residual business itself producing motor cars under the “Lion-Peugeot” name. The arrangement continued until 1910 after which (the death of Robert Peugeot’s father Eugène having apparently removed a major impediment to the idea) the Lion-Peugeot business and the Peugeot automobiles business were merged into a single company. Nevertheless, some smaller models continued to be branded as “Lion-Peugeots” until 1916.

== Sources and further reading ==
- Harald H. Linz, Halwart Schrader: Die große Automobil-Enzyklopädie, BLV, München 1986, ISBN 3-405-12974-5
- Wolfgang Schmarbeck: Alle Peugeot Automobile 1890–1990, Motorbuch-Verlag. Stuttgart 1990. ISBN 3-613-01351-7
