= Lion-Peugeot Type VA =

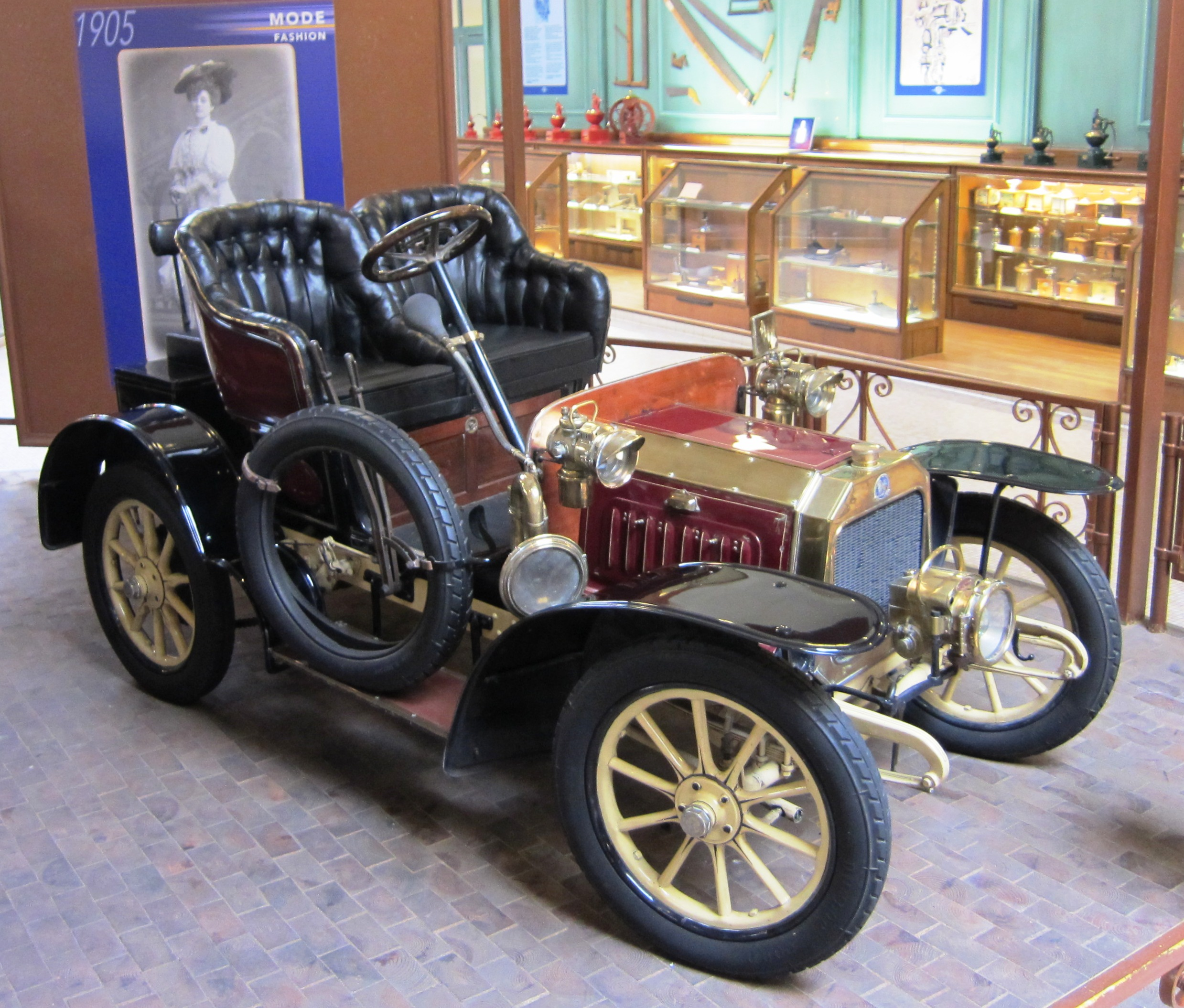

Overview
- Manufacturer: Lion-Peugeot
- Production: 1907 – 1908

Body and chassis
- Class: small car
- Layout: FR layout

The Lion-Peugeot Type VA is an early motor car produced near Valentigney by the French auto-maker Lion-Peugeot between 1907 and 1908.

First presented at the Paris Motor Show in 1905, but not offered for sale until the next year, the Type VA was the first of a succession of models to carry the “Lion-Peugeot” name.

The car was propelled using a single cylinder 785 cm³ four stroke engine, mounted ahead of the driver. A maximum of between 6 and 7 hp of power was delivered to the rear wheels, and a top speed of 35 km/h (22 mph) was claimed.

The Type VA was 2,850 mm long, with a wheel-base of 2,000 mm. A carriage format Voiturette body provided space for two while the covered carriage Tonneau / Phaeton format body offered space for four.

The Peugeot family had a long tradition of manufacturing steel components and mechanisms. The car appears to have featured a simple but efficient design, and the manufacturer was able to price the first Lion-Peugeot competitively. Volumes were, by the standards of the time, correspondingly high, and approximately 1,000 of the cars were produced between 1906 and 1908. This made the Lion-Peugeot Type VA the first car carrying the “Peugeot” name to reach 1,000 units. This also appears to have put the car ahead of Peugeot's own Peugeot Bébé model at the time, although the Bébé, in a succession of versions, would remain in production until 1916 and ultimately top 3,000 sales.

== Lion-Peugeot and Peugeot: the difference ==
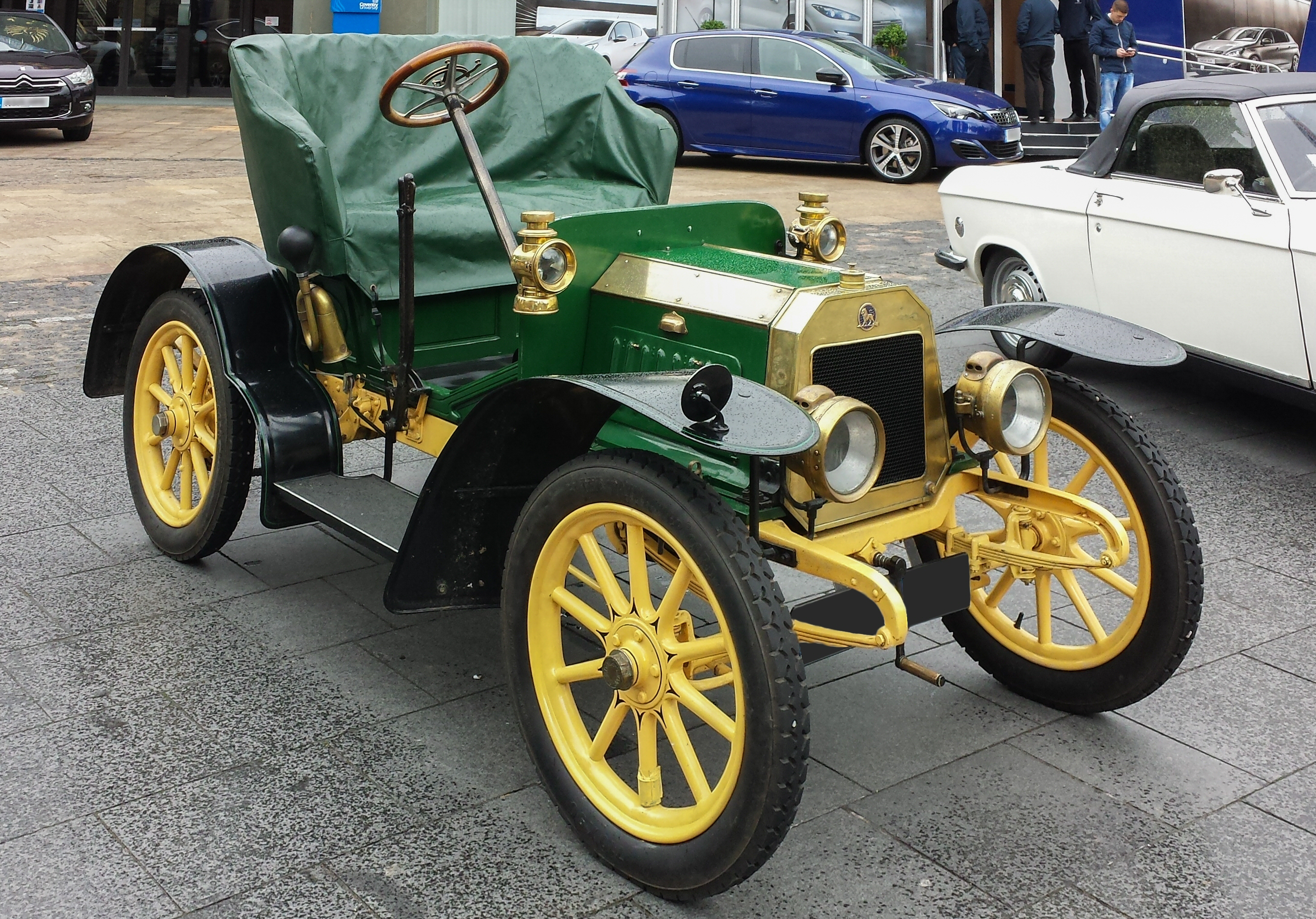
A 1907 VA

“Lion-Peugeot” is the name under which in 1906 Robert Peugeot and his two brothers, independently of their cousin Armand's "Automobiles Peugeot" company, established a car manufacturing business at Beaulieu near Vallentigny. Ten years earlier the automobile pioneer Armand Peugeot had split away from the family business after a long-standing disagreement over how intensively the company should diversify into larger scale automobile production. An agreement had at that time been entered into between Armand's “Automobiles Peugeot” company and the residual Peugeot business that the residual business should concentrate on its established metal tools and components businesses and its successful bicycle manufacturing activities, while Armand would have Peugeot branded powered vehicles to himself. During the ensuing ten years Armand's automobile business had grown rapidly, although it appears that the residual Peugeot business had probably not entirely avoided producing powered vehicles. In any event, under a new agreement signed in 1905, the residual Peugeot business made Armand an annual payment in return for which Armand consented to the residual business itself producing motor cars under the “Lion-Peugeot” name. The arrangement continued until 1910 after which (the death of Robert Peugeot's father Eugène having apparently removed a major impediment to the idea) the Lion-Peugeot business and the Peugeot automobiles business were merged into a single company. Nevertheless, some smaller models continued to be branded as “Lion-Peugeots” until 1916.

== Sources and further reading ==
- Harald H. Linz, Halwart Schrader: Die große Automobil-Enzyklopädie, BLV, München 1986, ISBN 3-405-12974-5
- Wolfgang Schmarbeck: Alle Peugeot Automobile 1890–1990, Motorbuch-Verlag. Stuttgart 1990. ISBN 3-613-01351-7
