= Peugeot Type 126 =

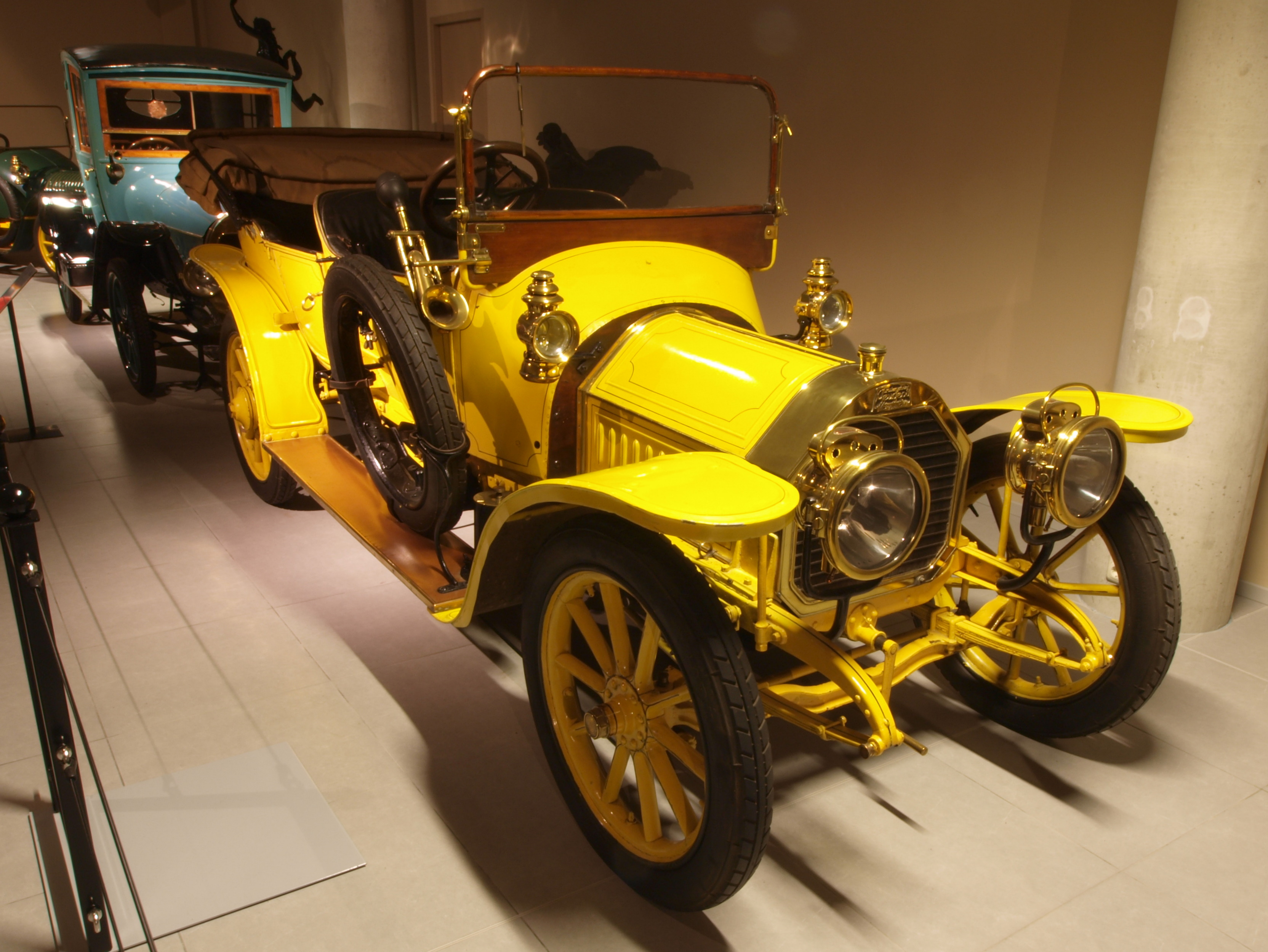

Overview
- Manufacturer: Peugeot
- Production: 1910

Body and chassis
- Class: Mid-sized car
- Layout: FR layout

Powertrain
- Engine: 2,212 cc (135.0 cu in) four-cylinder four-stroke; 785 cc (47.9 cu in) single-cylinder

The Peugeot Type 126 is an early motor car produced in 1910 by the French automaker Peugeot at their Audincourt plant. 350 were produced.

The vehicle was powered by a four-cylinder four-stroke 2,212 cc engine which was mounted ahead of the driver. A maximum 12 hp of power was delivered to the rear wheels by means of a rotating steel drive-shaft. The top speed quoted was 55 km/h (34 mph).

Instead of the four-cylinder engine, buyers could specify a single-cylinder 785 cc engine. The engine was small for a middle-sized car; the resulting vehicle was underpowered and slow. However, the option enabled Peugeot to hold the car out as a replacement for the recently discontinued Peugeot Type 48. A Type 126 with an engine between these two extremes was not offered, possibly because it would, thus powered, have competed too directly with the manufacturer’s Type 125 or Type 127 model. The “Automobiles Peugeot” business under Armand Peugeot appears to have been concentrating new product investment in moving the range upmarket at the end of the first decade of the twentieth century. This may have reflected an increasing pool of potential customers for larger cars after a decade of strong economic growth in France. However, there is also a view that Armand was keen to leave more space in the small-car market for his nephews’ Lion-Peugeot business, which in 1910 was formally reintegrated with Armand’s business into a single firm, thus reversing the Peugeot split of 1896.

The torpedo-bodied Peugeot Type 126 offered space for four.
