= Lion-Peugeot Type V2C3 =

Overview
- Manufacturer: Lion-Peugeot
- Production: 1911

Body and chassis
- Class: small car
- Layout: FR layout

The Lion-Peugeot Type V2C3 was an early motor car produced near Valentigney by the French auto-maker Lion-Peugeot in 1911. It closely resembled the manufacturer's Type V2C2 which it replaced. 520 V2C3s were produced.

The V2C3 was propelled using a two-cylinder 1,325 cm^{3} four stroke engine, mounted ahead of the driver. A maximum 12 hp of power was delivered to the rear wheels.

The car shared its 2,250 mm wheel base with the manufacturer's single cylinder Type VC3. The 3,200 mm body length provided space for between two and four people depending on the body specified. The range of different body types offered included a Phaeton, a Torpedo, a Limousine, a Voiturette, a “Touring car” and a sports car.

The V2C3 was built during the year following the formal merger of Lion-Peugeot with the “Automobiles Peugeot” business of Armand Peugeot. By this time, apart from the much smaller Peugeot Bébé, the part of the business that before the merger had been known as “Automobiles Peugeot” was producing no car with engines smaller than 2,000 cm^{3}: this shows the extent to which, by this time, the two Peugeot family automobile manufacturers were producing complementary ranges.

== Lion-Peugeot and Peugeot: the difference ==
“Lion-Peugeot” is the name under which in 1906 Robert Peugeot and his two brothers, independently of their cousin Armand's "Automobiles Peugeot" company, established a car manufacturing business at Beaulieu near Vallentigny. Ten years earlier the automobile pioneer Armand Peugeot had split away from the family business after a long-standing disagreement over how intensively the company should diversify into larger scale automobile production. An agreement had at that time been entered into between Armand's “Automobiles Peugeot” company and the residual Peugeot business that the residual business should concentrate on its established metal tools and components businesses along with its successful bicycle manufacturing activities, while Armand would have Peugeot branded powered vehicles to himself. During the ensuing ten years Armand's automobile business had grown rapidly, although it appears that the residual Peugeot business had probably not entirely avoided producing powered vehicles. In any event, under a new agreement signed in 1905, the residual Peugeot business made Armand an annual payment in return for which Armand consented to the residual business itself producing motor cars under the “Lion-Peugeot” name. The arrangement continued until 1910 after which (the death of Robert Peugeot's father Eugène having apparently removed a major impediment to the idea) the Lion-Peugeot business and the Peugeot automobiles business were merged into a single company. Nevertheless, some smaller models continued to be branded as “Lion-Peugeots” until 1916.

== Sources and further reading ==
- Harald H. Linz, Halwart Schrader: Die große Automobil-Enzyklopädie, BLV, München 1986, ISBN 3-405-12974-5
- Wolfgang Schmarbeck: Alle Peugeot Automobile 1890–1990, Motorbuch-Verlag. Stuttgart 1990. ISBN 3-613-01351-7
