= Lion-Peugeot Types VD and V4D =

Lion-Peugeot Type VD Lion-Peugeot Type V4D

Overview
- Manufacturer: Lion-Peugeot
- Production: 1913 – 1914

Body and chassis
- Class: small car
- Layout: FR layout

Powertrain
- Engine: 1888 cc I4

The Lion-Peugeot Type VD was a motor car produced near Valentigney by the French auto-maker Lion-Peugeot in 1913. It was developed from the slightly smaller Lion-Peugeot Type V4C3 of the previous year. Approximately 800 Lion-Peugeot Type VDs were produced.

For 1914 the Lion-Peugeot Type VD was replaced by the Lion-Peugeot Type V4D. The two cars differed very little from one another. Approximately 700 Lion-Peugeot Type V4Ds were produced.

The Types VD and V4D were both powered by a four-cylinder 1,888 cc four-stroke engine, mounted ahead of the driver. A maximum 10 hp of power was delivered to the rear wheels.

The cars also became known as Lion-Peugeot 10 CV models. This was a reference to their fiscal horse power, applying a system of car classification for taxation purposes recently established in France. Tax horsepower then, and for several decades to come, was defined purely as a function of the combined surface area of the engine’s cylinders, this being far easier to assess consistently and accurately than the actual power produced by an engine. In 1913 fiscal horse-power still tended to equate approximately to actual horse-power, although the two would diverge subsequently, as engines became more efficient at extracting power from a given sum of cylinder diameters. Eventually, in the second half of the twentieth century, more complex (and less internationally consistent) definitions of fiscal horse power would replace those defined only by cylinder diameters.

The Types VD and V4D featured a 2,500 mm wheel base. The 3,500 mm (approximately) overall length provided space for between two and five people depending on the body specified. The wide range of different body types offered followed a pattern that by now would have been familiar to many Lion-Peugeot buyers. It included a Torpedo, a Limousine, a "central steering" model and a small delivery van.

== Lion-Peugeot and Peugeot: the difference ==
"Lion-Peugeot" is the name under which in 1906 Robert Peugeot and his two brothers, independently of their cousin Armand's "Automobiles Peugeot" company, established a car manufacturing business at Beaulieu near Vallentigny. Ten years earlier the automobile pioneer Armand Peugeot had split away from the family business after a long-standing disagreement over how intensively the company should diversify into larger scale automobile production. An agreement had at that time been entered into between Armand's "Automobiles Peugeot" company and the residual Peugeot business that the residual business should concentrate on its established metal tools and components businesses along with its successful bicycle manufacturing activities, while Armand would have Peugeot branded powered vehicles to himself. During the ensuing ten years Armand’s automobile business had grown rapidly, although it appears that the residual Peugeot business had probably not entirely avoided producing powered vehicles. In any event, under a new agreement signed in 1905, the residual Peugeot business made Armand an annual payment in return for which Armand consented to the residual business itself producing motor cars under the "Lion-Peugeot" name. The arrangement continued until 1910 after which (the death of Robert Peugeot’s father Eugène having apparently removed a major impediment to the idea) the Lion-Peugeot business and the Peugeot automobiles business were merged into a single company. Nevertheless, some smaller models continued to be branded as "Lion-Peugeots" until 1916.

== Sources and further reading ==
- Linz, Harald H., Halwart Schrader: Die große Automobil-Enzyklopädie, BLV, München 1986, ISBN 3-405-12974-5
- Schmarbeck, Wolfgang: Alle Peugeot Automobile 1890–1990, Motorbuch-Verlag. Stuttgart 1990. ISBN 3-613-01351-7
