= Peugeot Type 159 =

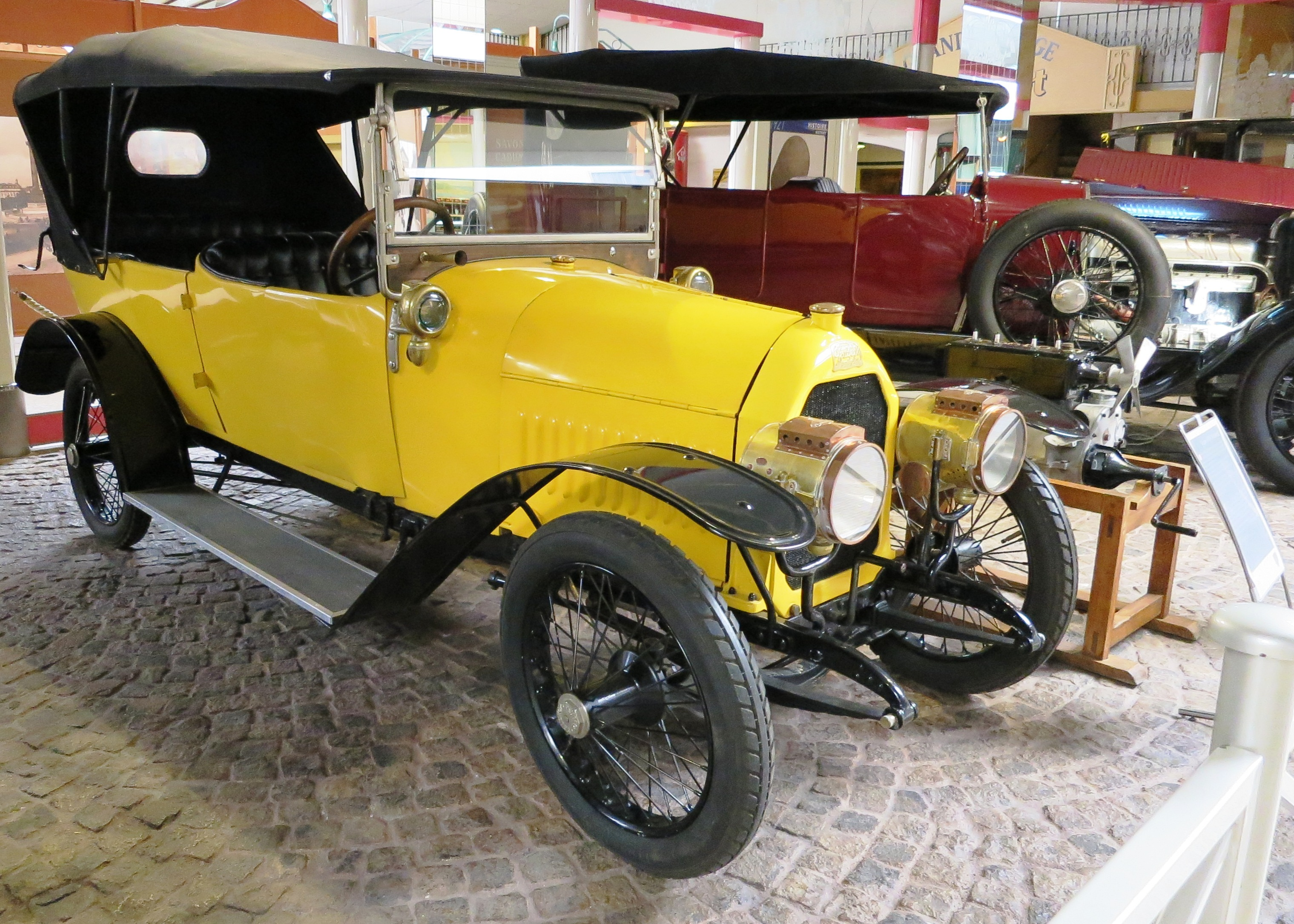

Overview
- Manufacturer: Peugeot
- Production: 1919–1920; 502 produced

Body and chassis
- Class: Small family car
- Layout: FR layout

Powertrain
- Engine: 1452 cc straight-4

Dimensions
- Wheelbase: 2640 mm
- Length: 3700 mm
- Width: 1450 mm

Chronology
- Predecessor: Lion-Peugeot
- Successor: Peugeot Type 163

The Peugeot Type 159 was a new model from Peugeot for 1919, part of a more consolidated post-World War I lineup. It had a 1.5 L four-cylinder engine, seated four, and was sold for merely a year before replacement.
