= Lion-Peugeot Types VC and VC1 =

Lion-Peugeot Type VC Lion-Peugeot Type VC1

Overview
- Manufacturer: Lion-Peugeot
- Production: 1906 – 1910

Body and chassis
- Class: small car
- Layout: FR layout

The Lion-Peugeot Type VC and the Lion-Peugeot Type VC1 are early motor cars produced near Valentigney by the French auto-maker Lion-Peugeot between 1906 and 1910.

The cars, which differed very little from one another, were propelled using a single cylinder 1,045 cm³ four stroke engine, mounted ahead of the driver. A maximum of between 8 and 9 hp of power was delivered to the rear wheels.

The Types VC and VC1 were in many ways similar to the manufacturer's Type VA which entered production in the same year, but they were slightly longer at 2,950 mm, with a wheel-base of 2,120 mm. A carriage format Voiturette body provided space for two while the covered carriage Tonneau / Phaeton format body offered ample space for four.

== Lion-Peugeot and Peugeot: the difference ==
“Lion-Peugeot” is the name under which in 1906 Robert Peugeot and his two brothers, independently of their cousin Armand's "Automobiles Peugeot" company, established a car manufacturing business at Beaulieu near Vallentigny. Ten years earlier the automobile pioneer Armand Peugeot had split away from the family business after a long-standing disagreement over how intensively the company should diversify into larger scale automobile production. An agreement had at that time been entered into between Armand's “Automobiles Peugeot” company and the residual Peugeot business that the residual business should concentrate on its established metal tools and components businesses along with its successful bicycle manufacturing activities, while Armand would have Peugeot branded powered vehicles to himself. During the ensuing ten years Armand's automobile business had grown rapidly, although it appears that the residual Peugeot business had probably not entirely avoided producing powered vehicles. In any event, under a new agreement signed in 1905, the residual Peugeot business made Armand an annual payment in return for which Armand consented to the residual business itself producing motor cars under the “Lion-Peugeot” name. The arrangement continued until 1910 after which (the death of Robert Peugeot's father Eugène having apparently removed a major impediment to the idea) the Lion-Peugeot business and the Peugeot automobiles business were merged into a single company. Nevertheless, some smaller models continued to be branded as “Lion-Peugeots” until 1916.

== Sources and further reading ==
- Harald H. Linz, Halwart Schrader: Die große Automobil-Enzyklopädie, BLV, München 1986, ISBN 3-405-12974-5
- Wolfgang Schmarbeck: Alle Peugeot Automobile 1890–1990, Motorbuch-Verlag. Stuttgart 1990. ISBN 3-613-01351-7
