= Lion-Peugeot =

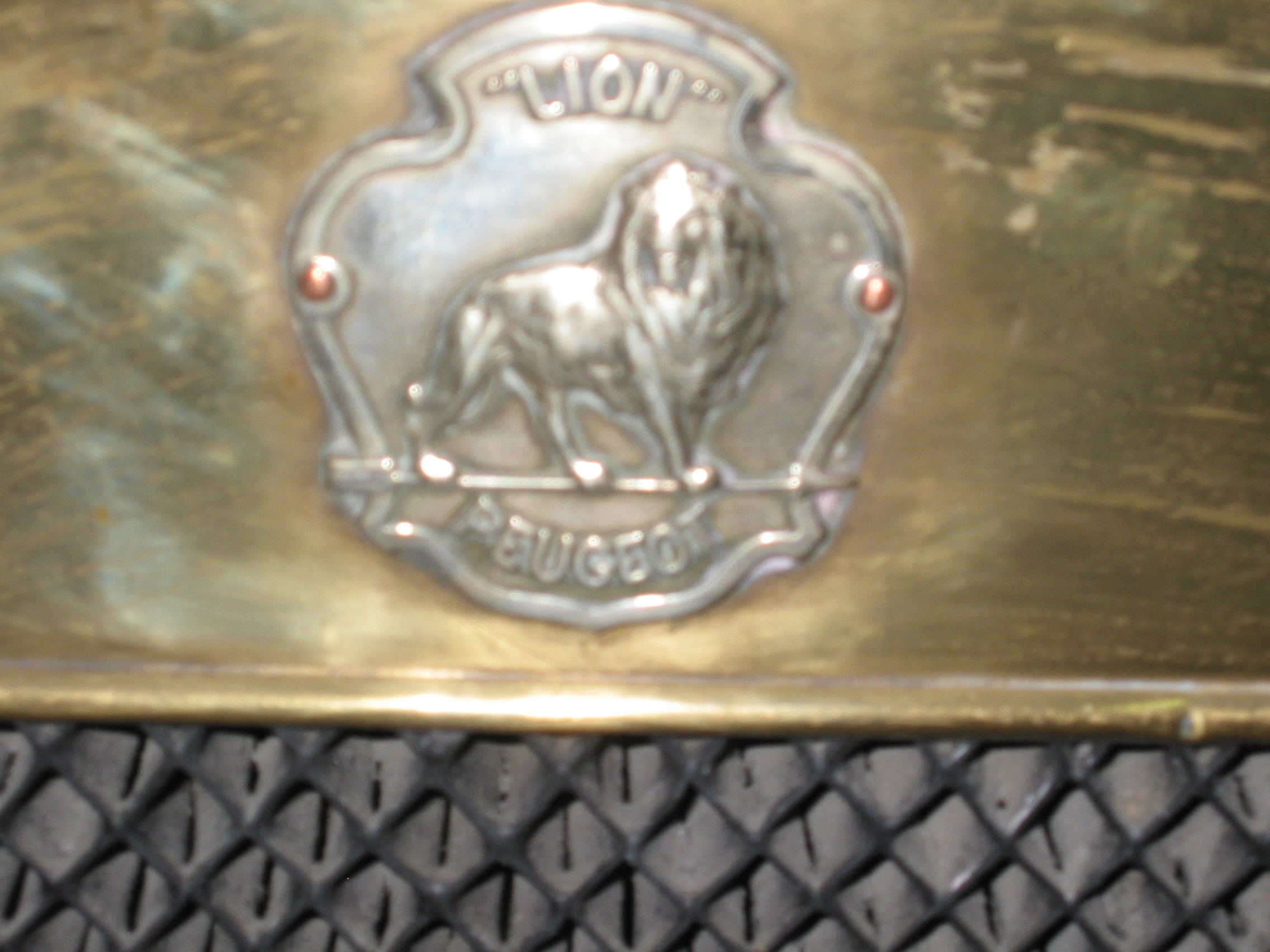
The Lion-Peugeot badge on a Lion-Peugeot VA

Lion-Peugeot is a formerly independent French auto-maker. It is the name under which in 1906 Robert Peugeot and his two brothers, independently of the established Peugeot car business, began to produce automobiles at Beaulieu near Valentigney.

In 1910, the two family auto-makers Automobiles Peugeot and Lion-Peugeot merged to form the business Société des Automobiles et Cycles Peugeot, but the merged business continued to use the Lion-Peugeot name for smaller models inherited from the formerly independent business until 1916.

== Background ==
To understand why there were two Peugeot automobile businesses it is necessary to refer to a family disagreement that culminated, in 1896, in Armand Peugeot leaving the family business which was called, at that stage, "Les Fils de Peugeot Frères" (The Sons of Peugeot Brothers). Eugène and Armand Peugeot, who were related to each other as second cousins, had recently taken over control of the successful Peugeot metal-working business specialising in certain types of industrial and domestic components and tools. (More than a century later, the Peugeot museum displays an impressive range of nineteenth century coffee grinders). The Peugeot company was an early participant in the automobile manufacturing business, their first petrol/gasoline car being produced in 1890 and gaining national publicity in 1891 through participation in the Paris–Brest–Paris cycle marathon.

Participation in the auto-business required investment on a scale that would commit the company to a major change of direction, away from products with which it had a proven track record. The company had been producing bicycles since 1882 which in the 1890s may very well have been seen as a safer investment than powered motor vehicles. Eugène Peugeot opposed the necessary scale of investment in automobile making, and 1896 his cousin split away, to form Automobiles Peugeot. The cousins signed an agreement that gave Armand's business the sole right to manufacture Peugeot automobiles, the corollary of which was that the residual Peugeot business, under Eugène, would stay out of the powered vehicle business.

Despite the agreement between the Peugeot cousins, the residual business under Eugène Peugeot continued to produce bicycles, tricycles and quadricycles, some with motors and some without. Relations with Armand evidently were not cordial.

== Reconciliation ==
By 1905, control over the residual Peugeot business had passed to the three sons of Eugène, Robert Peugeot (1873 – 1945), Pierre Peugeot (1871 – 1927) and Jules Peugeot (1882 – 1957). Relations between the new Peugeot generation and their cousin Armand, whose "Automobiles Peugeot" business was enjoying great success, became less confrontational with Eugène no longer so active in the business. An agreement was entered into to regularise relations between the two companies. The company previously controlled by Eugène agreed to pay a million francs annually to Armand Peugeot, and in return, Armand agreed to the company manufacturing cars independently of his own "Automobiles Peugeot" business. These cars started to be sold in 1906, badged as "Lion-Peugeots": the first of them was the Lion-Peugeot Type VA.

During the ensuing decade, Lion-Peugeot automobiles were produced and sold in reasonable quantities with several models breaking through the 1,000 units threshold. While the Peugeot Bébé, launched in 1904 by "Peugeot-Automobiles" before the reconciliation, continued its own successful career, new model investment by the "Peugeot-Automobiles" now concentrated on mid-range and larger cars, leaving the "Lion-Peugeot" business to build a Peugeot presence in the small car sector. This pattern was sustained during the remaining years of peace after the two businesses merged in 1910, until the termination of the "Lion-Peugeot" brand in 1916, by which time war-time economic conditions had for the time being effectively put an end to passenger car manufacturing in France.

Robert Peugeot and his brothers evidently felt none of their father's hostility to Armand, and it seems to have been the death of Eugène in 1907 that opened the way for the reunification of the two Peugeot automobile businesses. Armand's own only son had died in 1896, and his lack of a direct male heir may have encouraged him to respond positively to his junior kinsmens' promptings. The merger of the two businesses took place formally in 1910, although in terms of the way the model ranges came together, the merger took place progressively over several years. In 1916, demand for passenger cars having collapsed, the plant that had produced the Lion-Peugeots was closed, and after the war small models again became fully integrated into the Peugeot range. However, the first decade after the war saw France greatly impoverished, and it would be some years before automobile production would again become a profitable activity for Peugeot which had, prudently as matters turned out, retained a solid presence in the bicycle business.

== Lion-Peugeot Cars ==
Type	Years	Cylinders	Capacity	Power	Units produced
Type VA	1906–1908	1	785 cc	6½ hp	ca. 1,000
Type VC	1906–1910	1	1,045 cc	8½ hp	ca. 1,000
Type VC1	1906–1910	1	1,045 cc	8½ hp	included with VC
Type VC2	1909–1910	1	1,045 cc	9 hp	ca. 1,175
Type VC3	1911	1	1,045 cc	9 hp	135
Type VY	1908–1909	1	1,841 cc	12 hp	142
Type VY2	1908–1909	1	1,841 cc	12 hp	included with VY
Type V2C2	1910	2	1,325 cc	12 hp	680
Type V2Y2	1910	2	1,702 cc	16 hp	300
Type V2C3	1911	2	1,325 cc	12 hp	520
Type V2Y3	1911	2	1,702 cc	16 hp	215
Type V4C3	1912–1913	4	1,725 cc	9 hp	653
Type VD	1913	4	1,888 cc	10 hp	ca. 800
Type V4D	1914	4	1,888 cc	10 hp	ca. 700
Type VD2	1915	4	1,888 cc	10 hp	480

== Sources and further reading ==
Notes

- Harald H. Linz, Halwart Schrader: Die große Automobil-Enzyklopädie, BLV, München 1986, ISBN 3-405-12974-5
- Wolfgang Schmarbeck: Alle Peugeot Automobile 1890–1990, Motorbuch-Verlag. Stuttgart 1990. ISBN 3-613-01351-7
