= Lion-Peugeot Type VC2 =

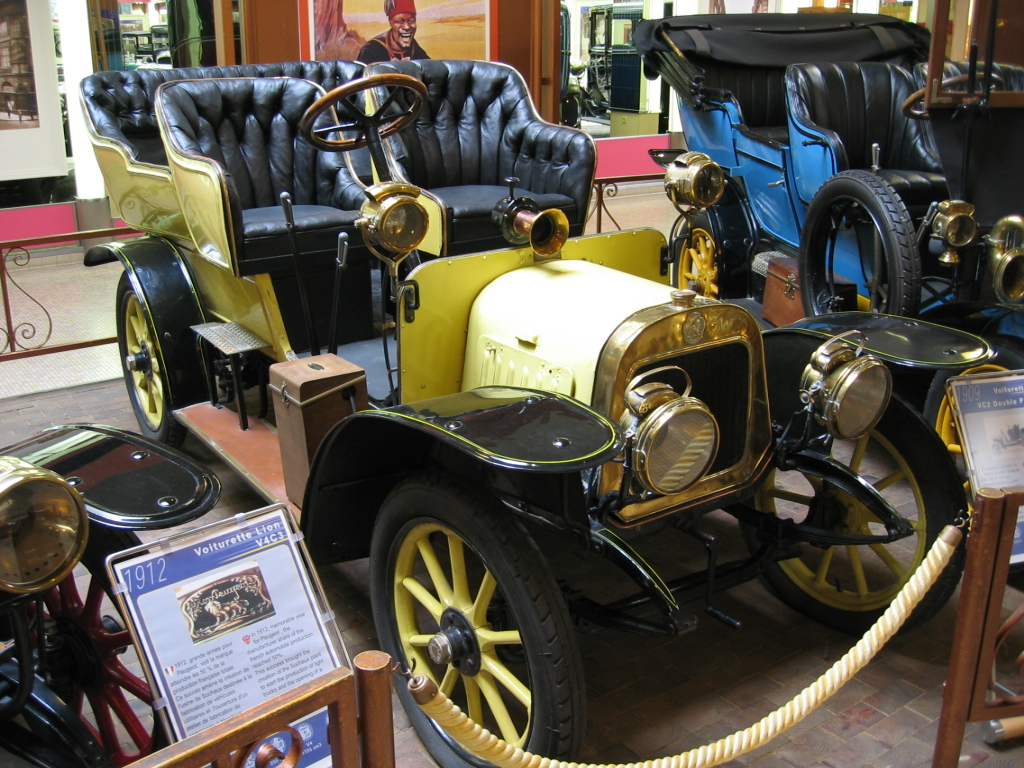

Overview
- Manufacturer: Lion-Peugeot
- Production: 1909 – 1910

Body and chassis
- Class: small car
- Layout: FR layout

The Lion-Peugeot Type VC2 was an early motor car produced near Valentigney by the French auto-maker Lion-Peugeot between 1909 and 1910. 1,175 were produced.

The cars represented an evolution of the Lion-Peugeot Type VC1 which had been in production since 1906. The Type VC2 retained a single cylinder 1,045 cm³ four stroke engine, mounted ahead of the driver. A maximum 9 hp of power was delivered to the rear wheels.

The wheelbase was now extended to 2,250 mm, supporting a vehicle length of 3,320 mm and providing space for between two and four people depending on the body specified. For this model Lion-Peugeot offered a wider range of open and closed body types than hitherto, including a Phaeton, a Landaulet, a Limousine and a small delivery van.

== Lion-Peugeot and Peugeot: the difference ==
“Lion-Peugeot” is the name under which in 1906 Robert Peugeot and his two brothers, independently of their cousin Armand’s "Automobiles Peugeot" company, established a car manufacturing business at Beaulieu near Vallentigny. Ten years earlier the automobile pioneer Armand Peugeot had split away from the family business after a long-standing disagreement over how intensively the company should diversify into larger scale automobile production. An agreement had at that time been entered into between Armand’s “Automobiles Peugeot” company and the residual Peugeot business that the residual business should concentrate on its established metal tools and components businesses along with its successful bicycle manufacturing activities, while Armand would have Peugeot branded powered vehicles to himself. During the ensuing ten years Armand’s automobile business had grown rapidly, although it appears that the residual Peugeot business had probably not entirely avoided producing powered vehicles. In any event, under a new agreement signed in 1905, the residual Peugeot business made Armand an annual payment in return for which Armand consented to the residual business itself producing motor cars under the “Lion-Peugeot” name. The arrangement continued until 1910 after which (the death of Robert Peugeot’s father Eugène having apparently removed a major impediment to the idea) the Lion-Peugeot business and the Peugeot automobiles business were merged into a single company. Nevertheless, some smaller models continued to be branded as “Lion-Peugeots” until 1916.

== Sources and further reading ==
- Harald H. Linz, Halwart Schrader: Die große Automobil-Enzyklopädie, BLV, München 1986, ISBN 3-405-12974-5
- Wolfgang Schmarbeck: Alle Peugeot Automobile 1890–1990, Motorbuch-Verlag. Stuttgart 1990. ISBN 3-613-01351-7
