= Peugeot Type 63 =

Overview
- Manufacturer: Peugeot
- Production: 1904

Body and chassis
- Class: mid-sized car
- Layout: FR layout

Dimensions
- Wheelbase: 2,100 mm (82.7 in) (63A); 2,400 mm (94.5 in) (63B)

The Peugeot Type 63 is an early motor car designed by Armand Peugeot and produced by the French auto-maker Peugeot at their Audincourt plant in 1904. 136 were produced, divided between shorter wheelbase Type 63As and longer wheelbase Type 63Bs.

The car was seen by some as a belated replacement for the company’s Type 36, intended as a mid-range car, but with more interior space than most competitor vehicles. Nevertheless, with a wheel-base 2,100 mm (82.7 in) on the Type 63A and 2,400 mm (94.5 in) on the Type 63B, the Type 63 was substantially longer.

The Type 63 was propelled using a parallel twin cylinder 1,078 cc four stroke engine, mounted ahead of the driver. A maximum of 7 hp (5 kW) of power was delivered to the rear wheels by means of a rotating drive-shaft.

Body types offered included an open carriage Tonneau format body, what would subsequently become known as a Torpedo body and a Coupé-Limousine which at that time was a body style resembling a small closed carriage but with an engine instead of horses.

== Sources and further reading ==
- Wolfgang Schmarbeck: Alle Peugeot Automobile 1890-1990. Motorbuch-Verlag. Stuttgart 1990. ISBN 3-613-01351-7
