= Vy (disambiguation) =

Vy is a transport operator in Norway.

Vy or VY may also refer to:

== In transportation ==
- V_{Y}, the speed for the best rate of climb in aviation
- Lion-Peugeot Types VY and VY2, French cars produced between 1908 and 1909
- Holden Commodore (VY), an executive car produced by Australian manufacturer Holden from 2002 to 2004
- Formosa Airlines (IATA code VY), a domestic airline from 1966 to 1999
- Vueling (IATA code VY), a Spanish low-cost airline founded in 2004

== People ==
- Lê Nguyên Vỹ (1933–1975), South Vietnamese brigadier general
- Nguyễn Văn Vy (born 1916), South Vietnamese lieutenant general, Chief of Staff of the Army and Defense Minister

== Other uses ==
- Vy, Burkina Faso, a town
- VyOS, a Linux-based network operating system
- University of Vaasa (Vaasan yliopisto), Finland
- Vermont Yankee Nuclear Power Plant, Vernon, Vermont, United States
- VY Canis Majoris, an enormous star
- VY Piscium or HR 515, a variable star
- VY Leonis, a red giant

== See also ==
- Viy (disambiguation)
