= Peugeot Type 163 =

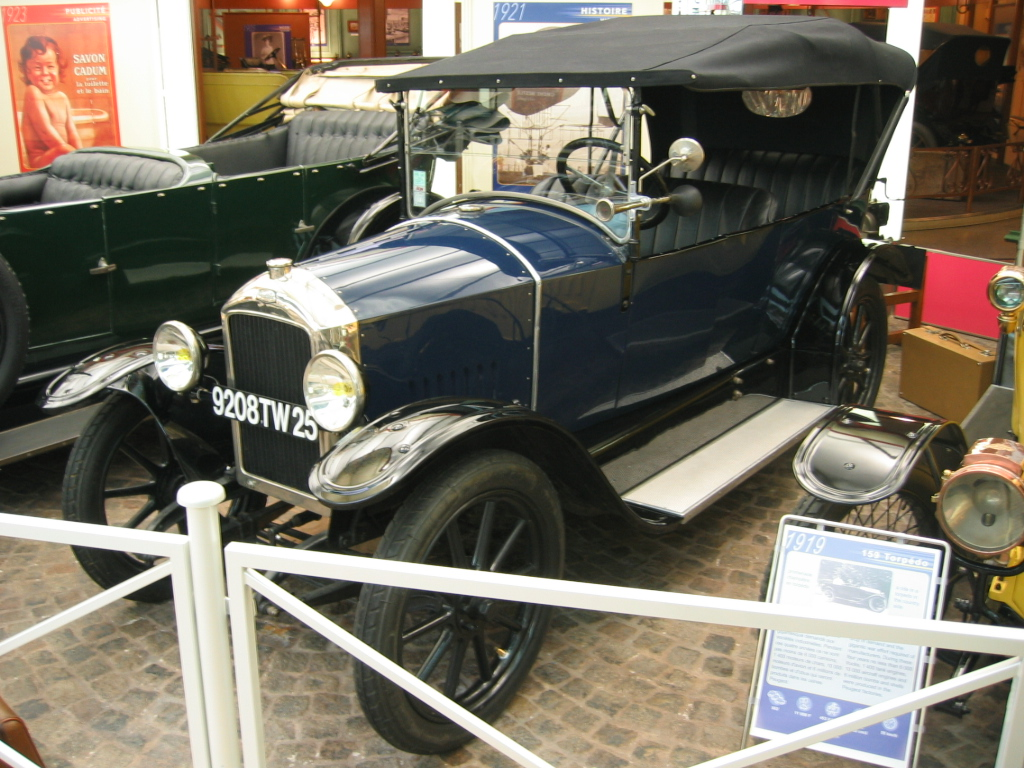

Overview
- Manufacturer: Peugeot
- Production: 1919–1924; 11,925 produced

Body and chassis
- Class: Small family car
- Layout: FR layout

Chronology
- Predecessor: Peugeot Type 159
- Successor: Peugeot 177B

The Peugeot Type 163 and associated models were produced from 1919 to 1924 by Peugeot. The car's engine placed it in the 10CV class.

== Background ==
Peugeot returned to passenger car production after the war slightly less rapidly than Paris based Renault and Citroën, both of which were quick off the mark with new entrants in the 10HP class. Peugeot's 159 was very much a stopgap solution, and the Type 163, prepared during the summer of 1919, was a much more modern contender.

== Models ==
The original Type 163 had a wheelbase of 99.2 inches (2,520 mm) and a 1.4 L (1437 cc) engine. In 1922 the manufacturer added the Type 163 BS, a sportier model with less weight, an uprated 1.5 L (1480 cc) engine Four-Wheels drive, and a longer 103.9 inches (2,640 mm) wheelbase. In 1923 came the Type 163 BR, which carried over most of the mechanicals from Type 163 BS, but was heavier and slower. Total production came to 11,925.

Models and Production
Model	Year	Production
Type 163	1919-1924	9,349
Type 163 BS	1922–1924	346
Type 163 BR	1923–1924	2,230
