= Peugeot Bébé =

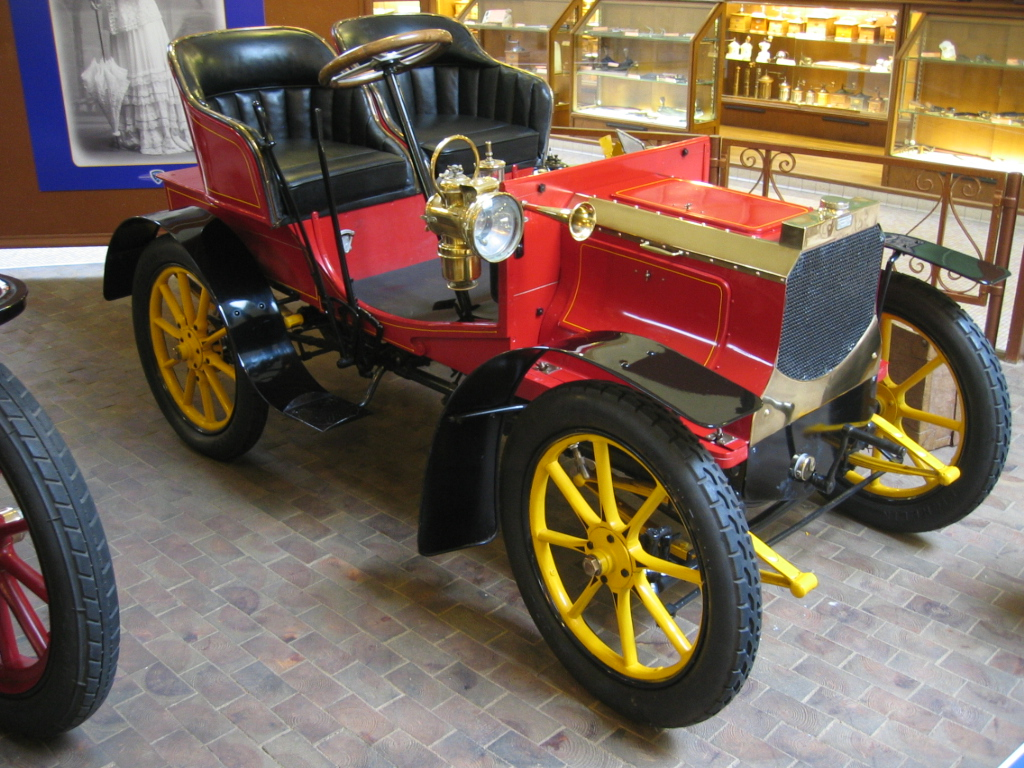

Overview
- Manufacturer: Peugeot
- Also called: Peugeot Type 69 (1905); Peugeot Type BP1 (1913 - 1916)
- Production: 1905–1912; 1913–1916
- Assembly: Audincourt (1905 - 1912); Beaulieu (1913 - 1916)
- Designer: Ettore Bugatti (Type BP1)

Body and chassis
- Class: Supermini
- Layout: FR layout

Powertrain
- Engine: 652 cc single-cylinder 855 cc I4
- Transmission: 3-speed manual

Chronology
- Predecessor: Peugeot Type 57
- Successor: Peugeot Quadrilette

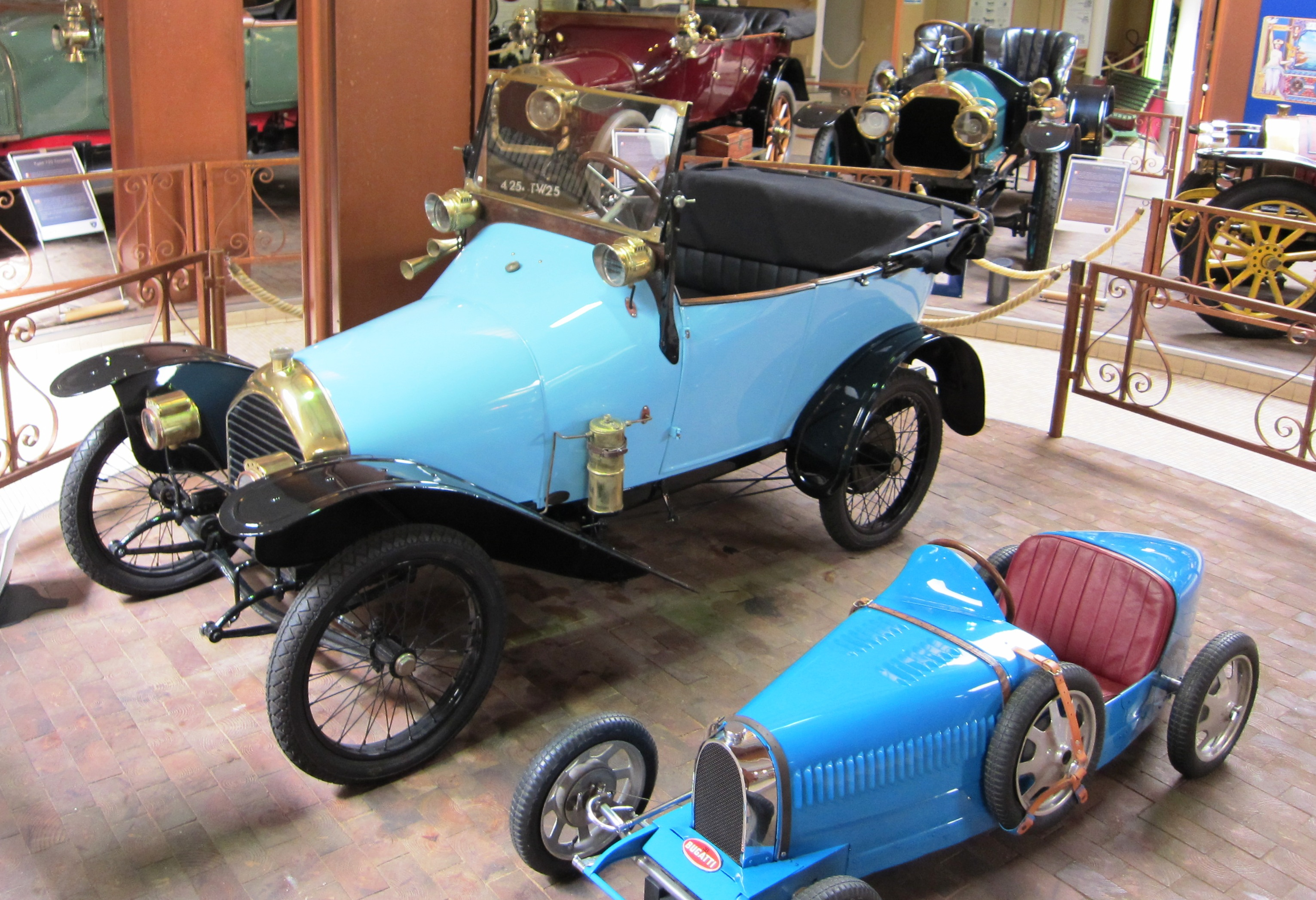
Bébé Peugeot (designed by Bugatti), with a Bugatti-shaped childs pedal car exhibited beside it, highlighting the visual similarity between the small Peugeot and early Bugatti designs.

The Peugeot Bébé or Baby was a small car nameplate from Peugeot made from 1905 to 1916. Vehicles under this name were known technically within Peugeot as the Type 69 and the Type BP1.

== Type 69 ==
The original Bébé first appeared at the Paris Motor Show in 1904 and greatly impressed attendees as a modern and robust creation that was cheap, small, and practical. Its weight was 350 kilograms (770 lb) and length was 2.7 metres (110 in), and these tiny dimensions meant that its small engine could propel it to 40 kilometres per hour (25 mph). Though selling price was deliberately kept as low as possible, technologies like rack and pinion steering and a driveshaft instead of a chain were included in the vehicle. Production began in Audincourt in 1905, and the car proved to be popular. Bébé sold 400 units in the first year, or 80 percent of Peugeot's production. It was also exported, particularly to Britain. The Type 69 was sold only during 1905.

A Type 69 was one of the first two motor vehicles in Tibet, imported by William Frederick Travers O'Connor in 1907 and later given as a gift to the Thubten Choekyi Nyima, the 9th Panchen Lama.

== Type BP1 ==
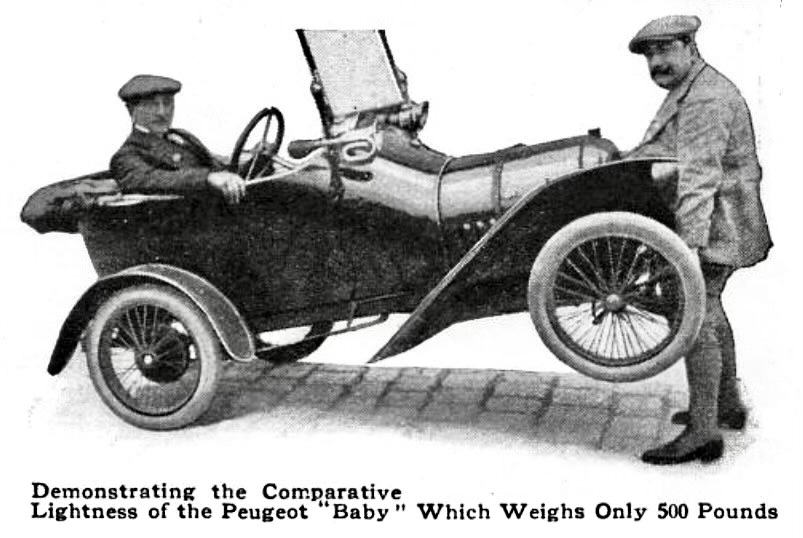
Peugeot Type BP1 (1913)

The Type BP1 Bébé was a design by Ettore Bugatti, initially for the German car firm Wanderer , then also built under license by Peugeot for the French market. Peugeot displayed it under their marque at the Paris Motor Show in 1912. Production began in 1913 following discontinuation of the Type 69. Wanderer built their car with Bugatti's own four-speed transmission, but in order to keep production costs down for the French version, Peugeot fitted a 2-speed gearbox initially, which was then replaced by their own three-speed. The engine was also Peugeot's own, a tiny straight-four engine that produced 10 PS (7 kW) at 2000 rpm, which gave the small car a top speed of 60 kilometres per hour (37 mph). Weight was again below 350 kilograms (770 lb), though the track was wide enough for two to sit abreast. Bébé scored some racing success among small car classes, notably at Mont Ventoux in 1913, where it won in its class.

This model ran until 1916. Advertising promoted its qualities as an economy product, in one case highlighting the comparison with more conventional transport in the case of a rural doctor, needing to cover approximately 40 kilometers (25 miles) per day, for whom a Bébé would replace a team of two horses, while costing no more than one of them.

With a total of 3,095 produced, and despite the dire economic conditions created by the war, the Bugatti designed Bébé was the first production Peugeot to breach the 3,000 units threshold.
