= Landaulet (car) =

Car body style

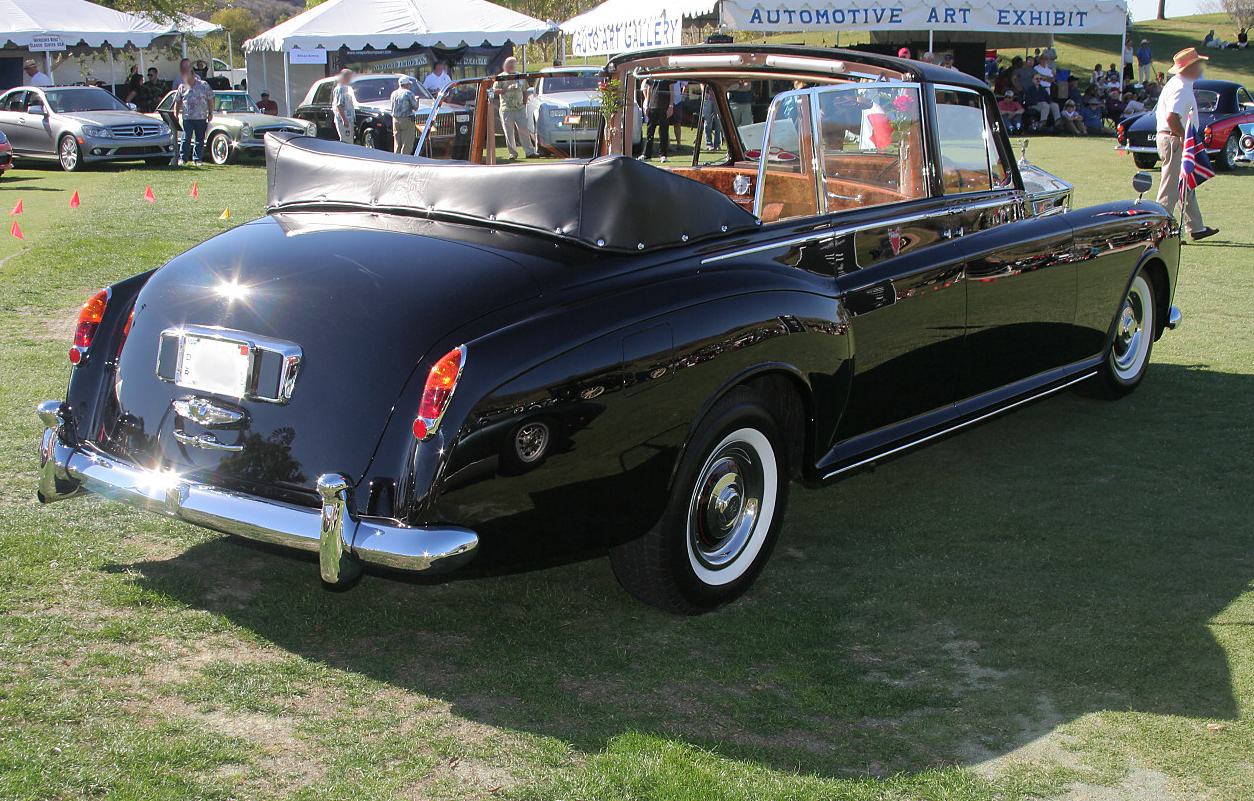
1966 Rolls-Royce Phantom V State Landaulet

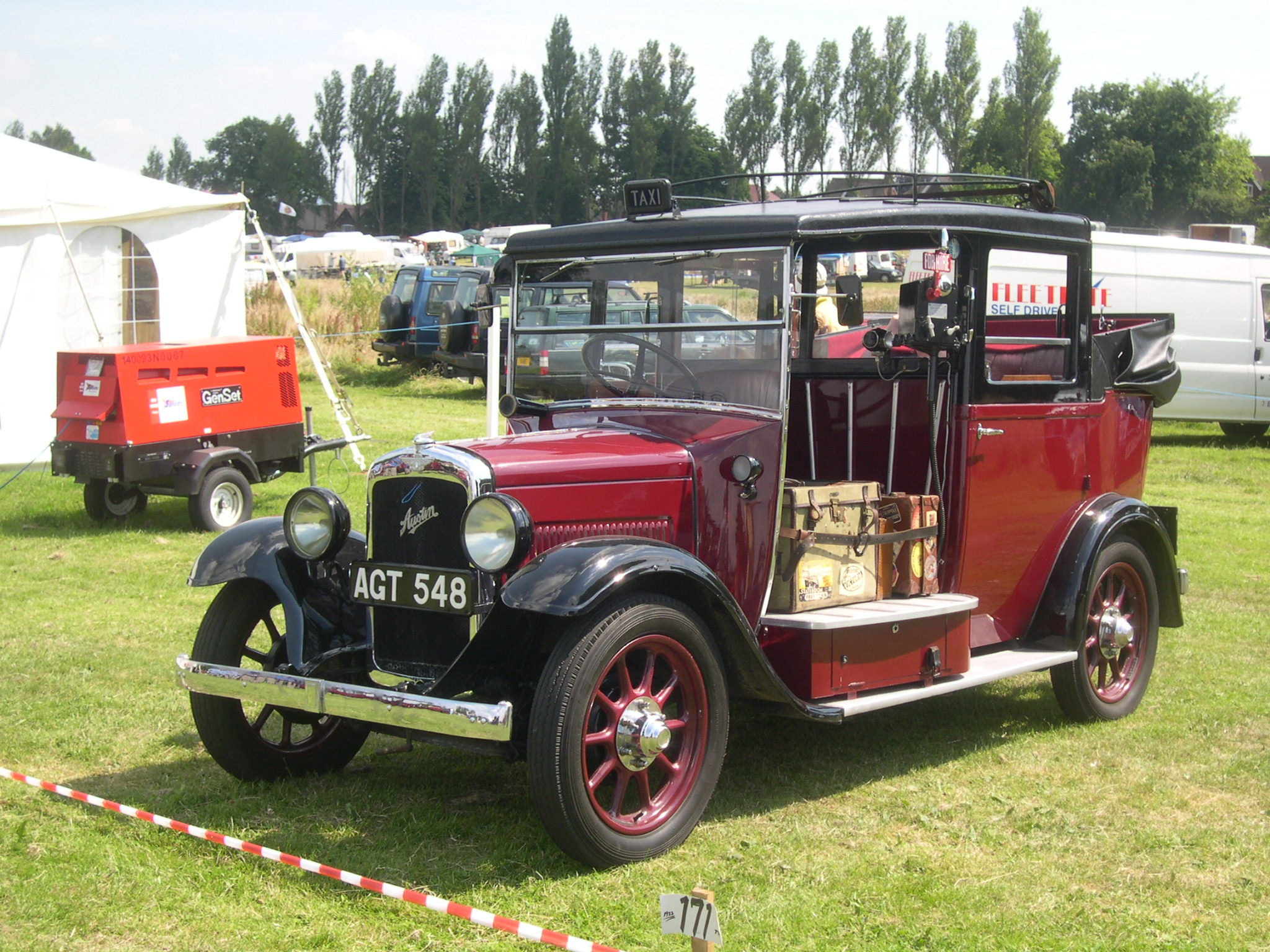
1934 Austin 12/4 taxicab

A landaulet, also known as a landaulette, is a car body style where the rear passengers are covered by a convertible top. Often the driver is separated from the rear passengers by a division, as with a limousine.

During the first half of the 20th century, taxicabs were often landaulets, with models such as the Austin 12/4 and the Checker Model G and early Checker Model A being a common sight in larger cities.

Around the middle of the 20th century landaulets were built for public figures such as heads of state to use for formal processions or parades when they wished to be more visible to large crowds. Open cars are now less frequently used, due to security concerns.

== History ==
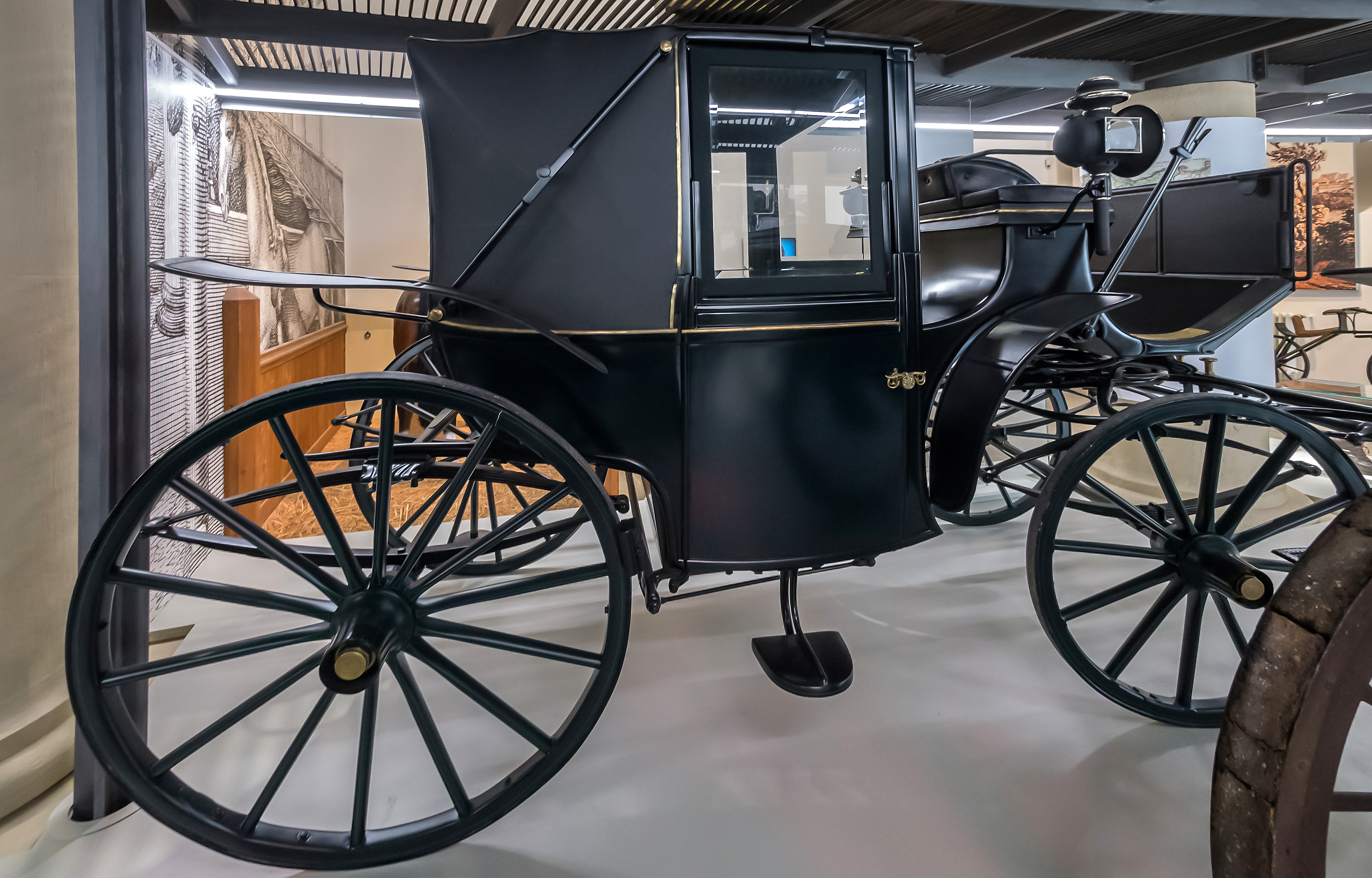
A landaulet carriage with its roof closed

The car body style is derived from the horse-drawn carriage of similar style that was a cut-down (coupé) version of a landau.

In British English, the term landaulet is used specifically for horse-drawn carriages, and landaulette is used when referring to motor vehicles.

Like many other car body styles landaulets continued from horse-drawn carriages to automobiles. The condition of the driver's section may range from having no weather protection at all, as was often the case with early landaulets, to being fully enclosed.

=== 20th century ===
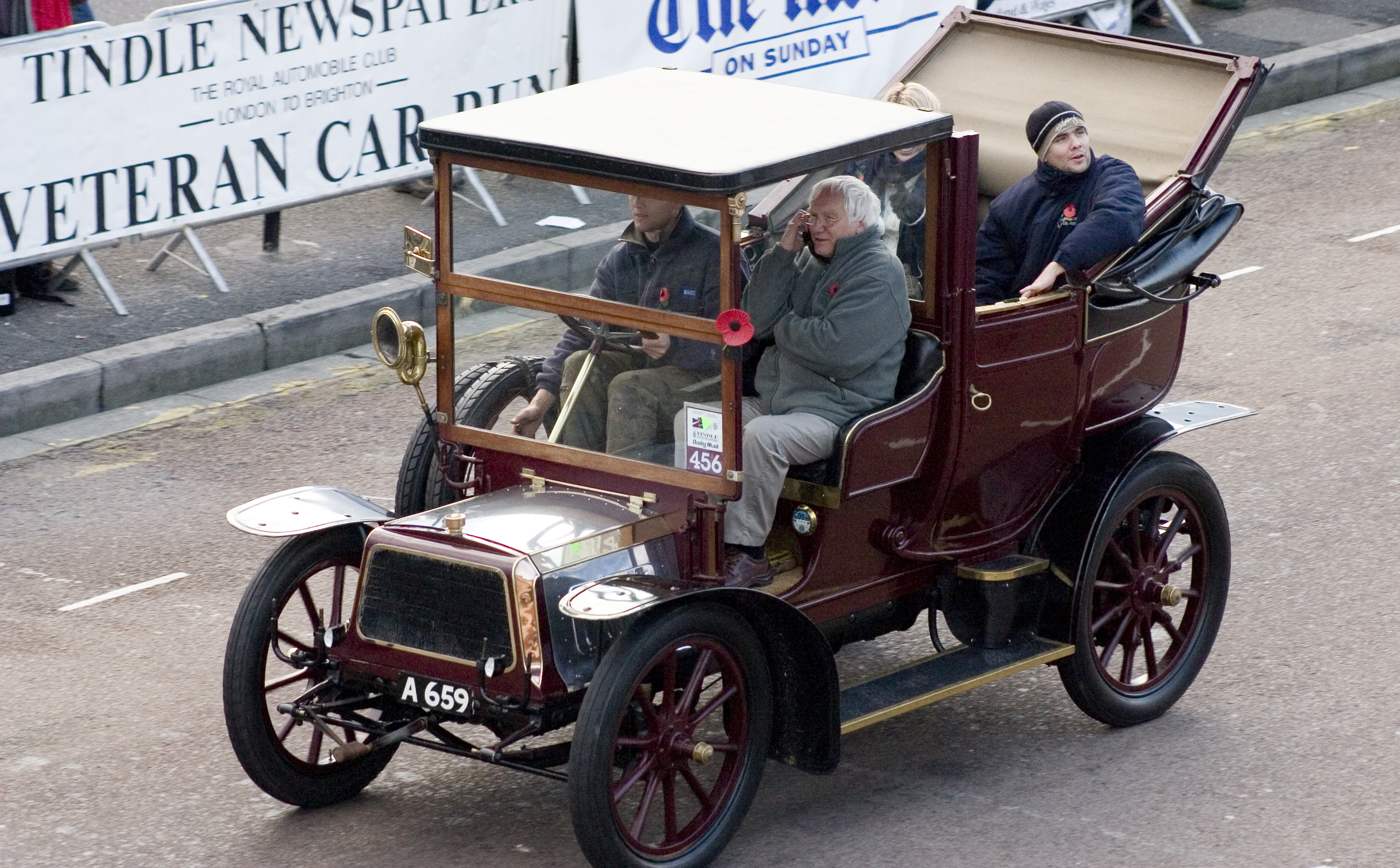
1904 Panhard et Levassor 8 hp

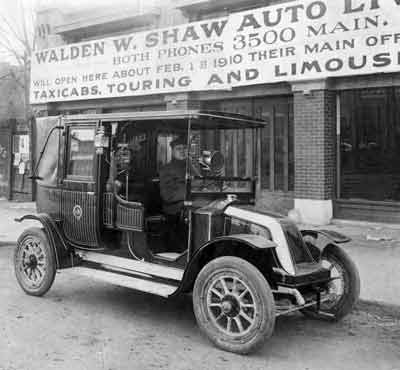
1910 Croxton-Keeton taxi cab

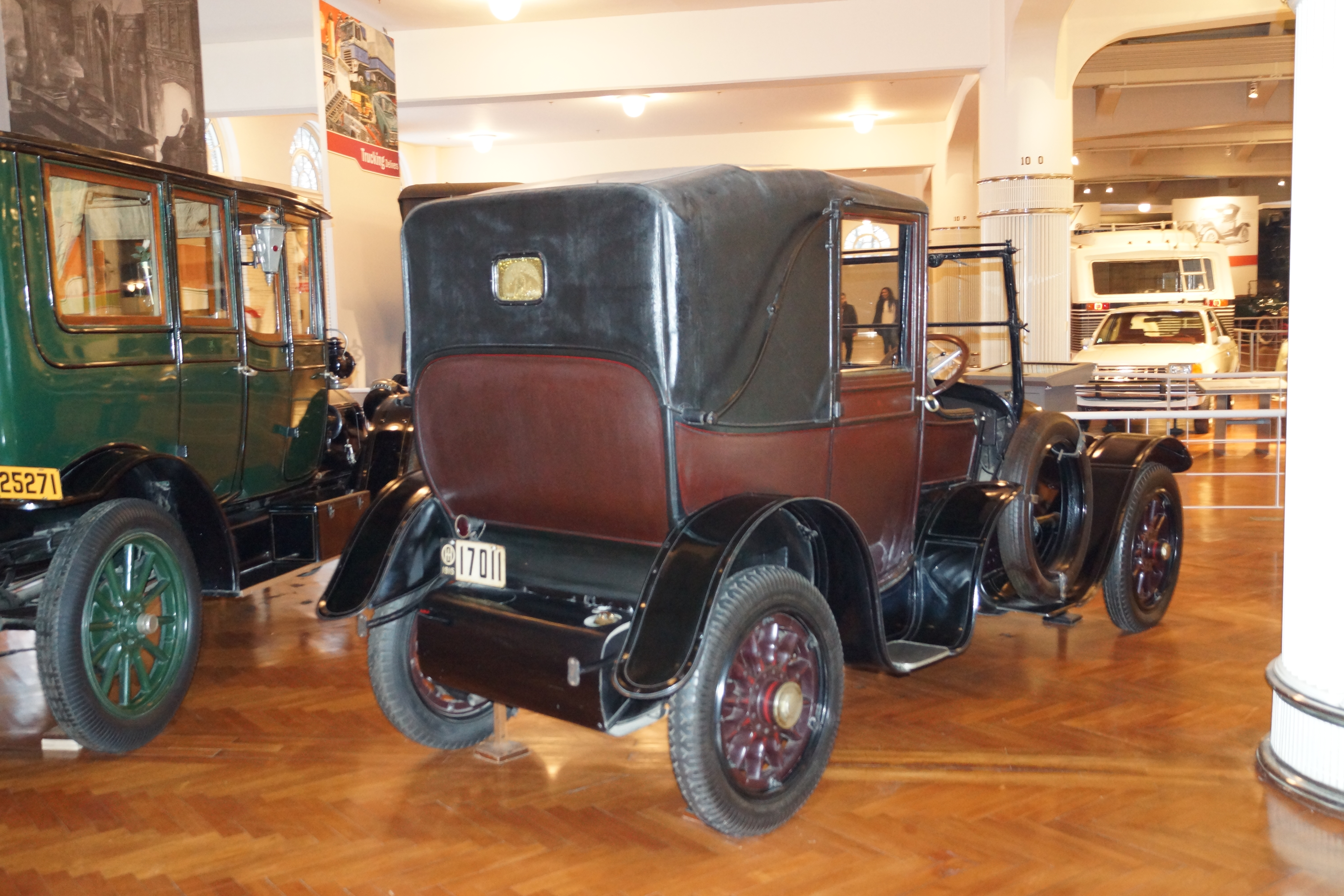
1915 Brewster & Co. town landaulet
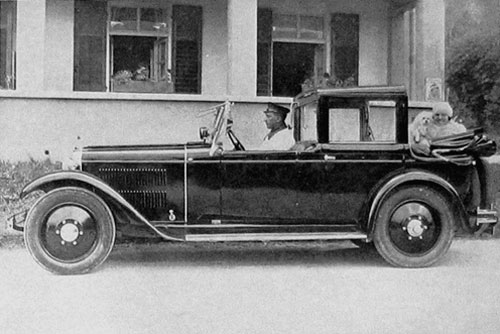
1929 Steyr 19 Type XX

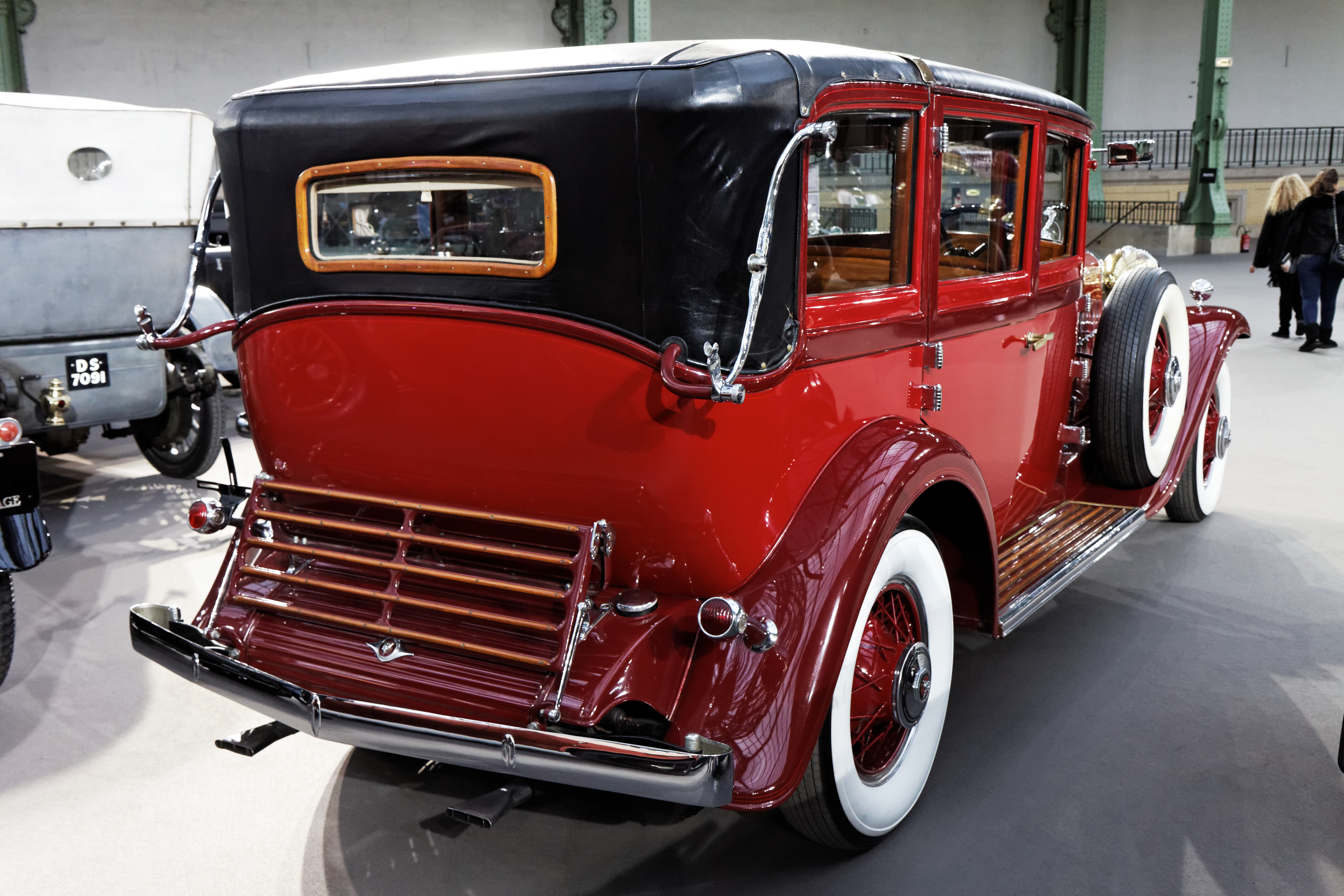
1930 Cadillac V16

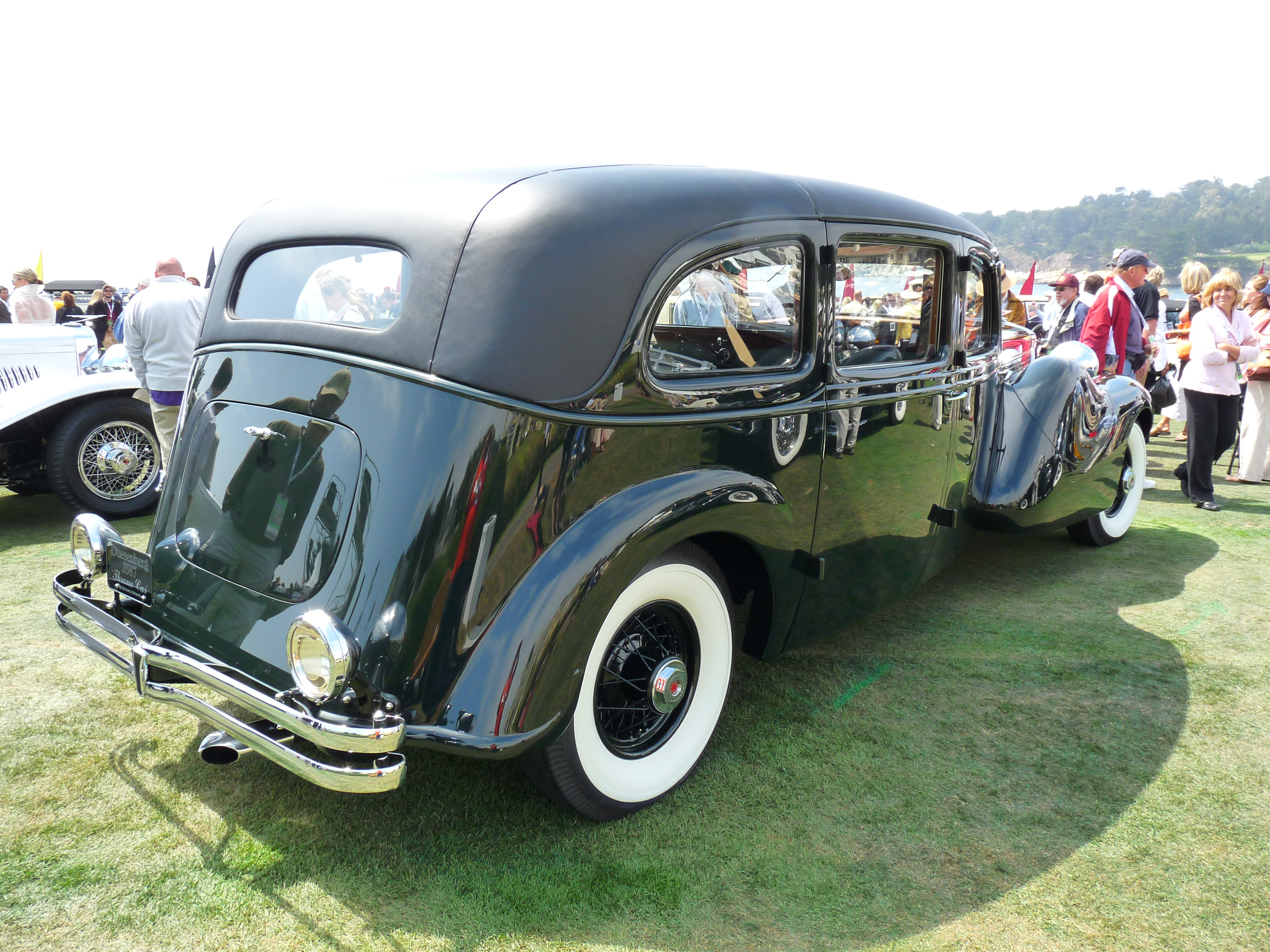
1937 Duesenberg Model J by Bohmann & Schwartz

New landaulet cars became rare in the 1930s

After WWII landaulets were unfashionable and built only as parade cars for heads of state. Pope John XXIII, Pope Paul VI, and Pope Benedict XVI used landaulets based on Mercedes-Benz automobiles but after 1970 seemed to generally prefer modified military or commercial vehicles for the same job. Landaulet cars give occupants no protection from assassins.

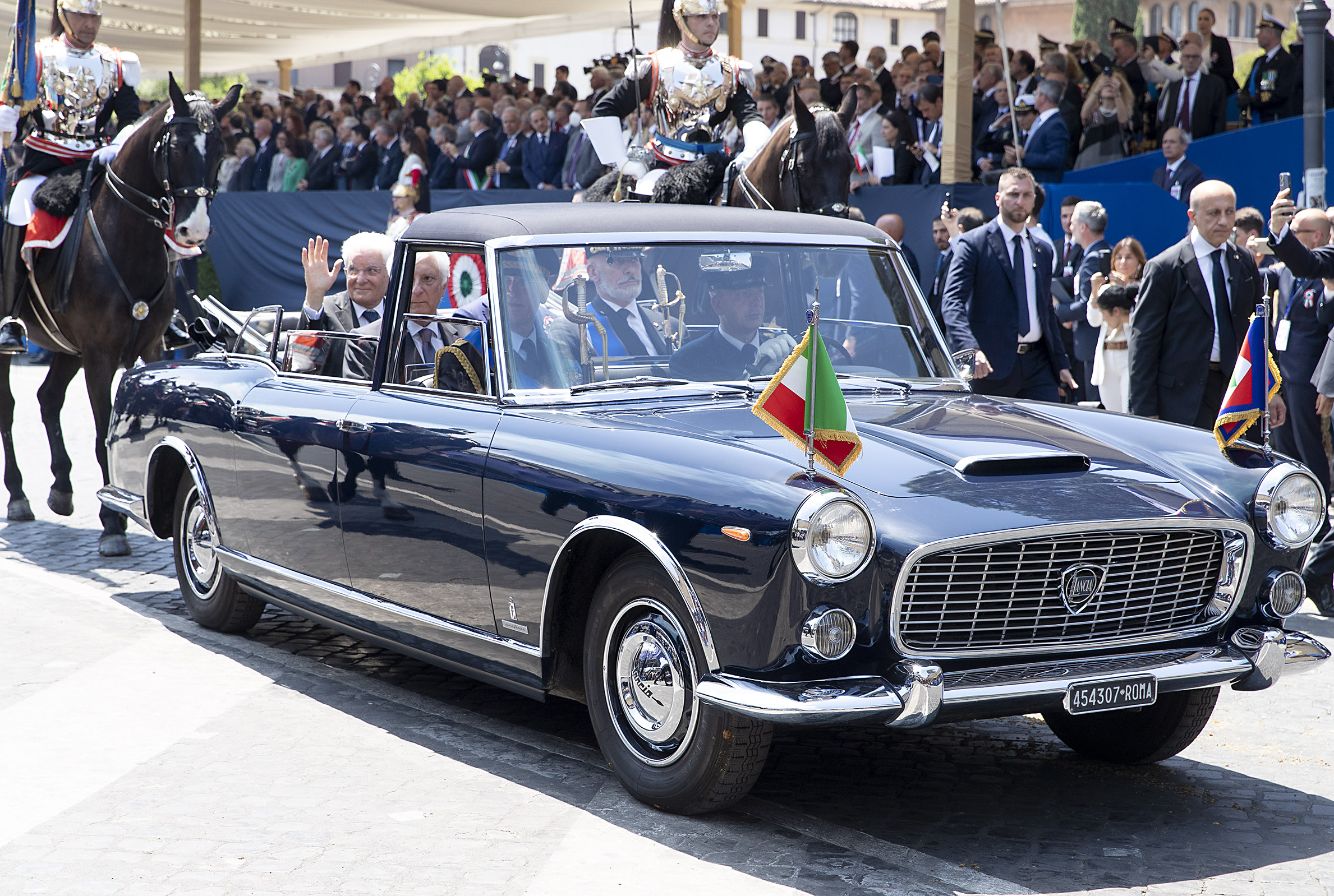
1960 Lancia Flaminia Presidenziale, a State car for the president of the Italian Republic

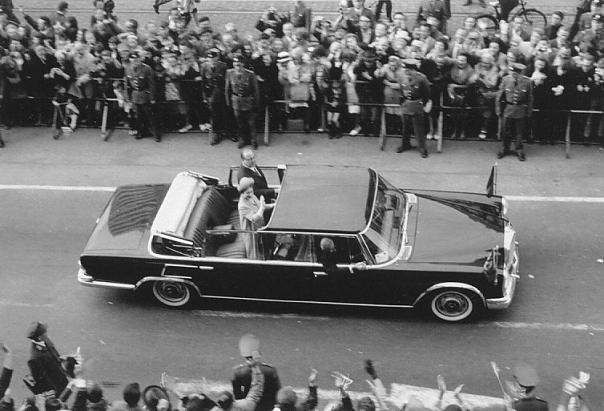
Queen Elizabeth II in a Mercedes 600 landaulet in Duisburg, Germany, 1965

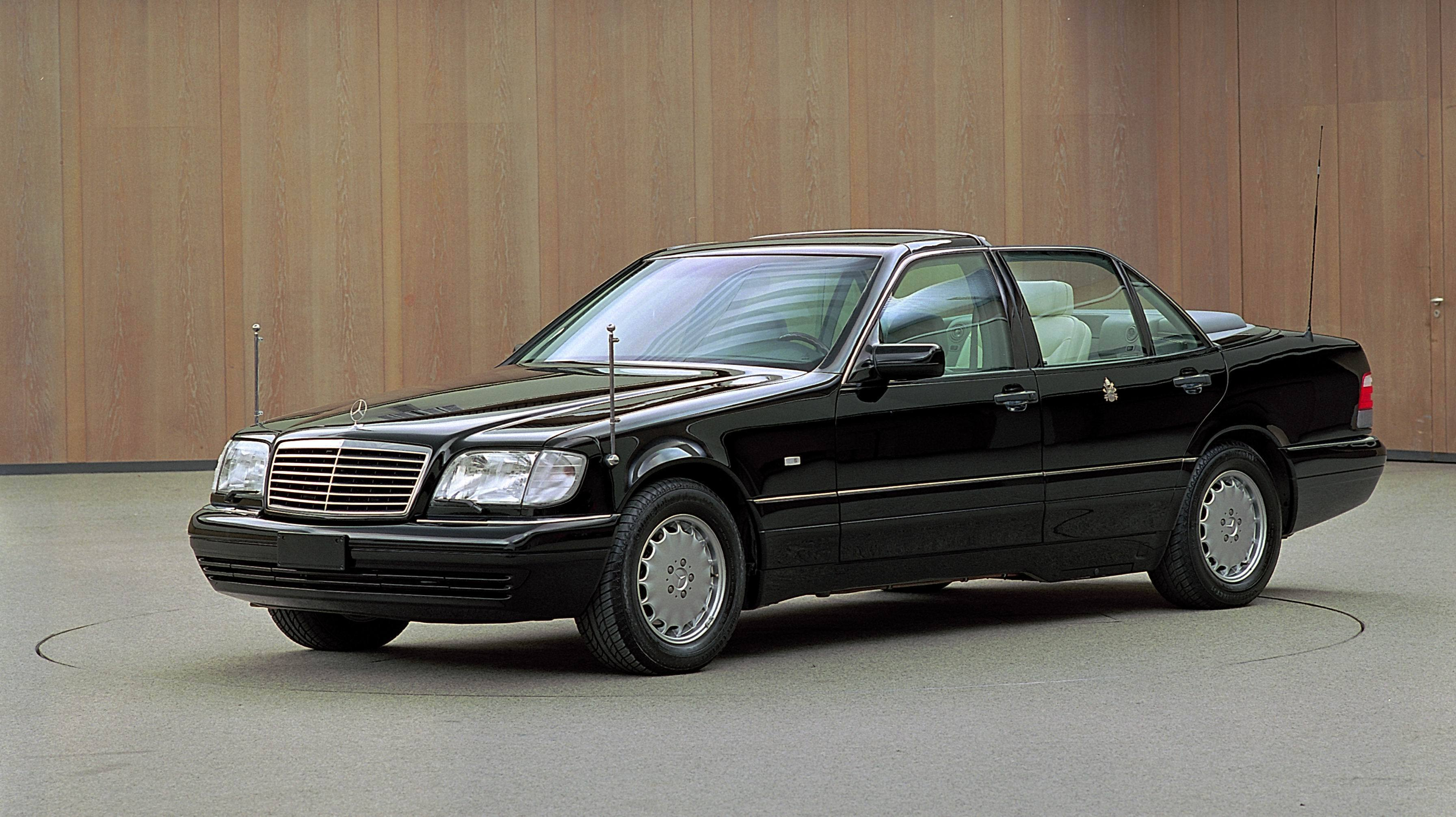
1997 Mercedes-Benz S500 landaulet used by the Pope

=== 21st century 'concept cars' ===
In 2011, a Lexus LS 600h L landaulet was created for use at the wedding of Albert II, Prince of Monaco, and Charlene Wittstock. The car was used to transport the couple on the day of their wedding, and afterwards put on display at the Oceanographic Museum in Monaco.

The Peugeot 607 Paladine is a one-off landaulet version of the Peugeot 607. It was built as a concept car and presented in March 2000 at the Geneva Motor Show. The car was first used seven years later by Nicolas Sarkozy for his inauguration as president of France in May 2007.

The Maybach division of Daimler AG showed a Maybach 62 S landaulet concept car at the Middle East International Auto Show in November 2007. They added the landaulet to their 2009 model line.

Mercedes-Maybach G 650 Landaulet was introduced as the first SUV under the sub-brand name Mercedes-Maybach at the Geneva Motor Show in March 2017 with production limited to 99 units.

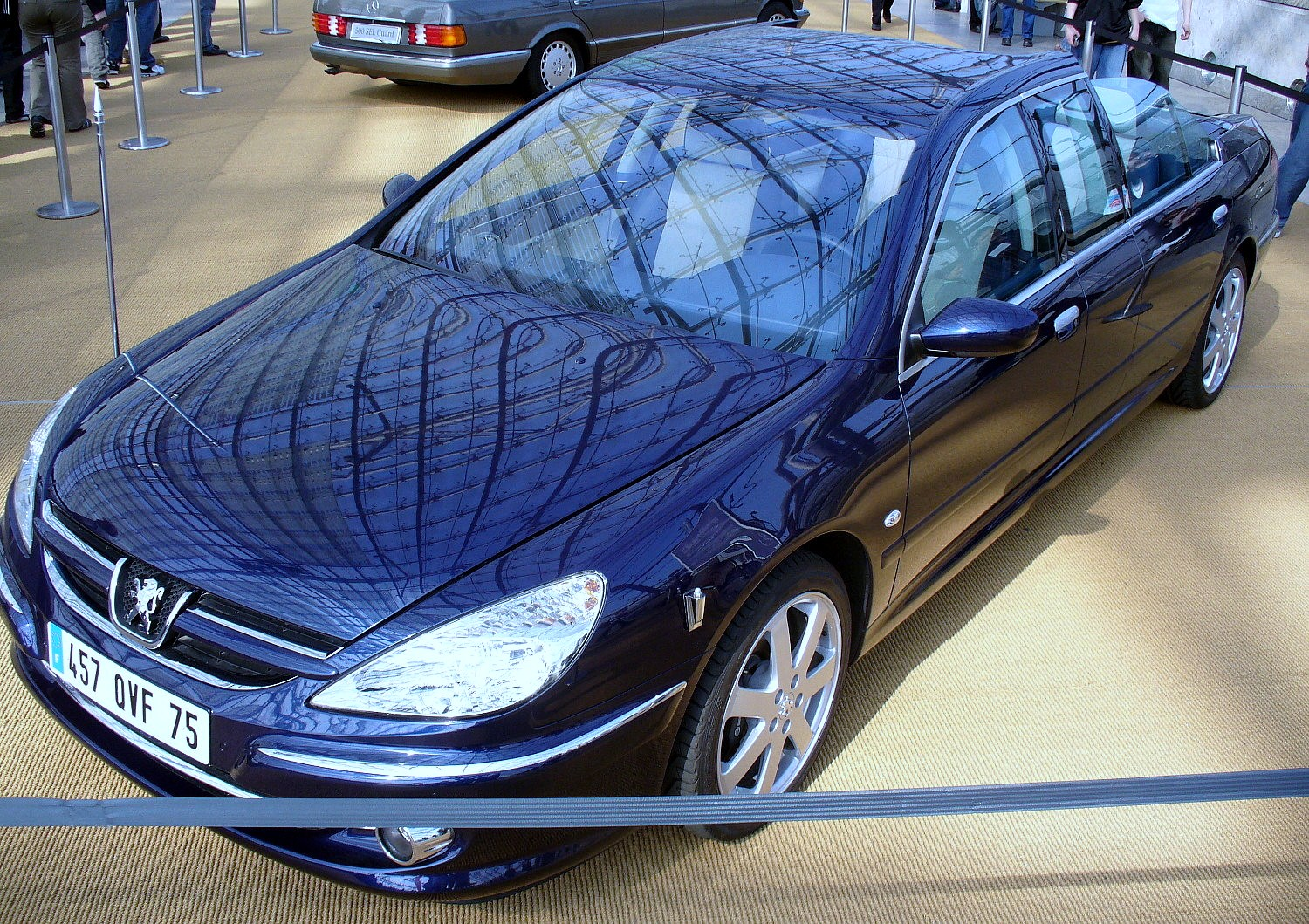
Peugeot 607 Paladine

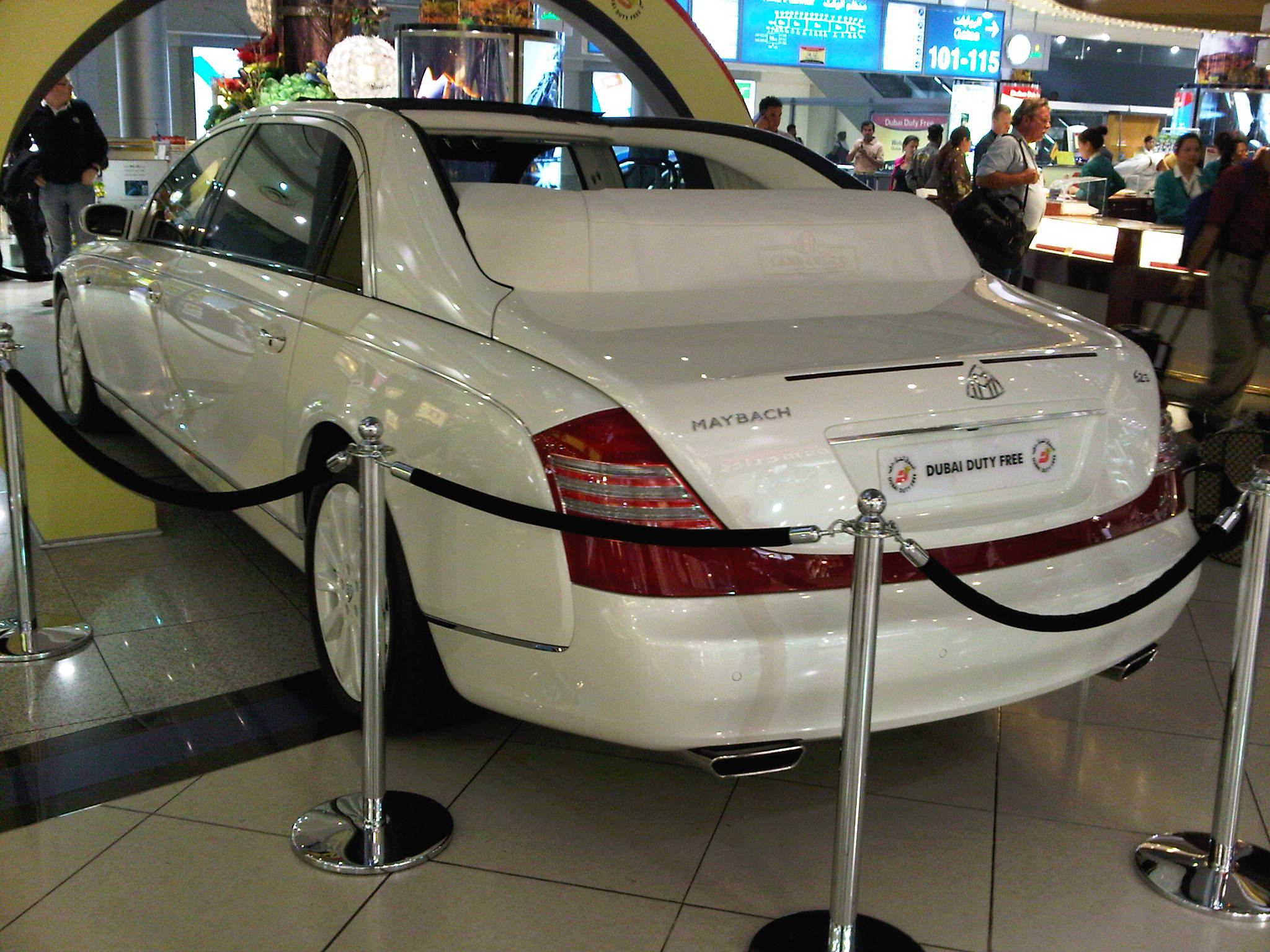
Maybach 62 landaulet

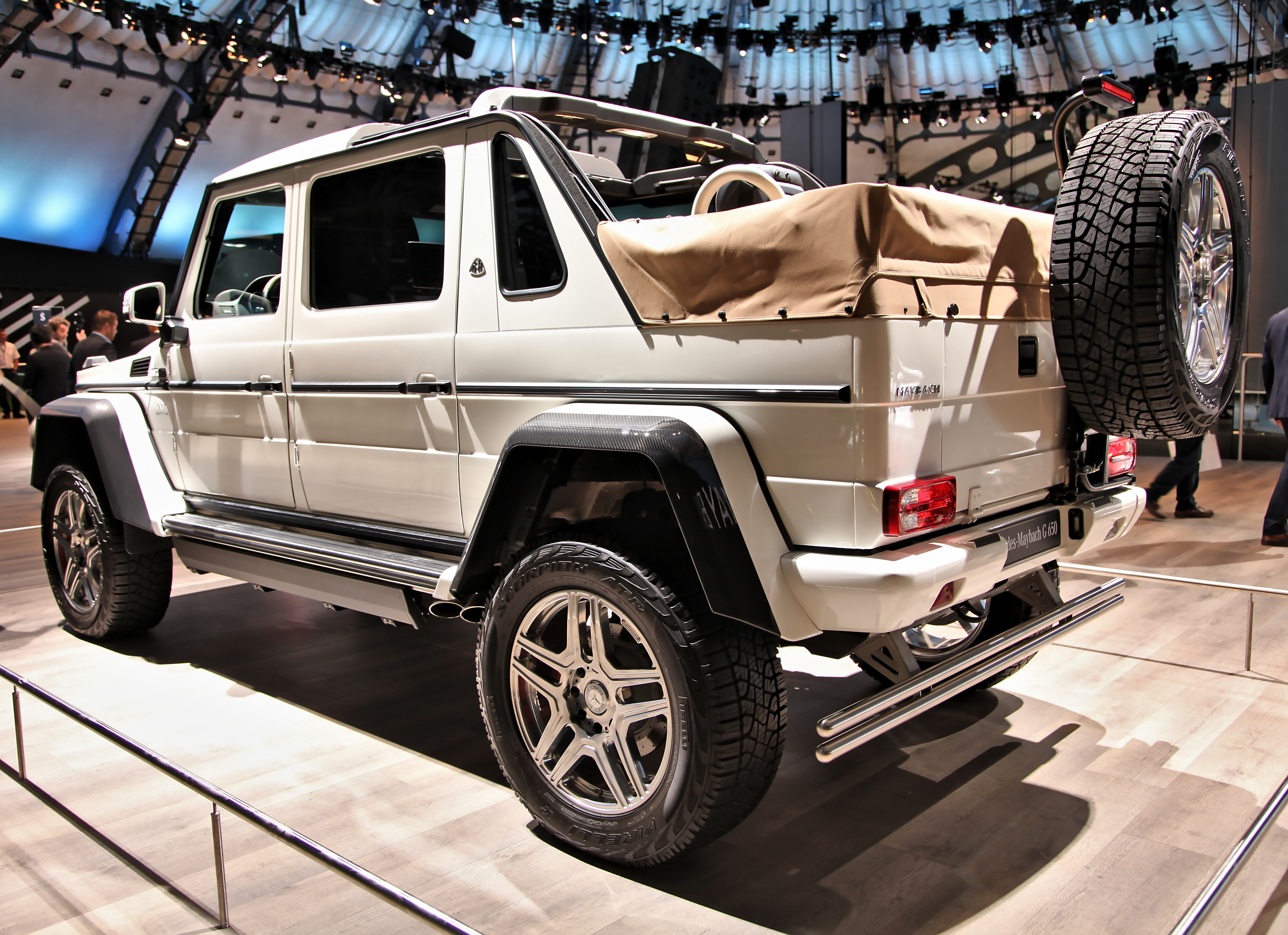
Mercedes-Maybach G 650 Landaulet

== See also ==
- Landau (automobile)
- Landau (carriage)
- Town car – the opposite with front seats open and the rear compartment closed
