= Valentigney =

- Commune
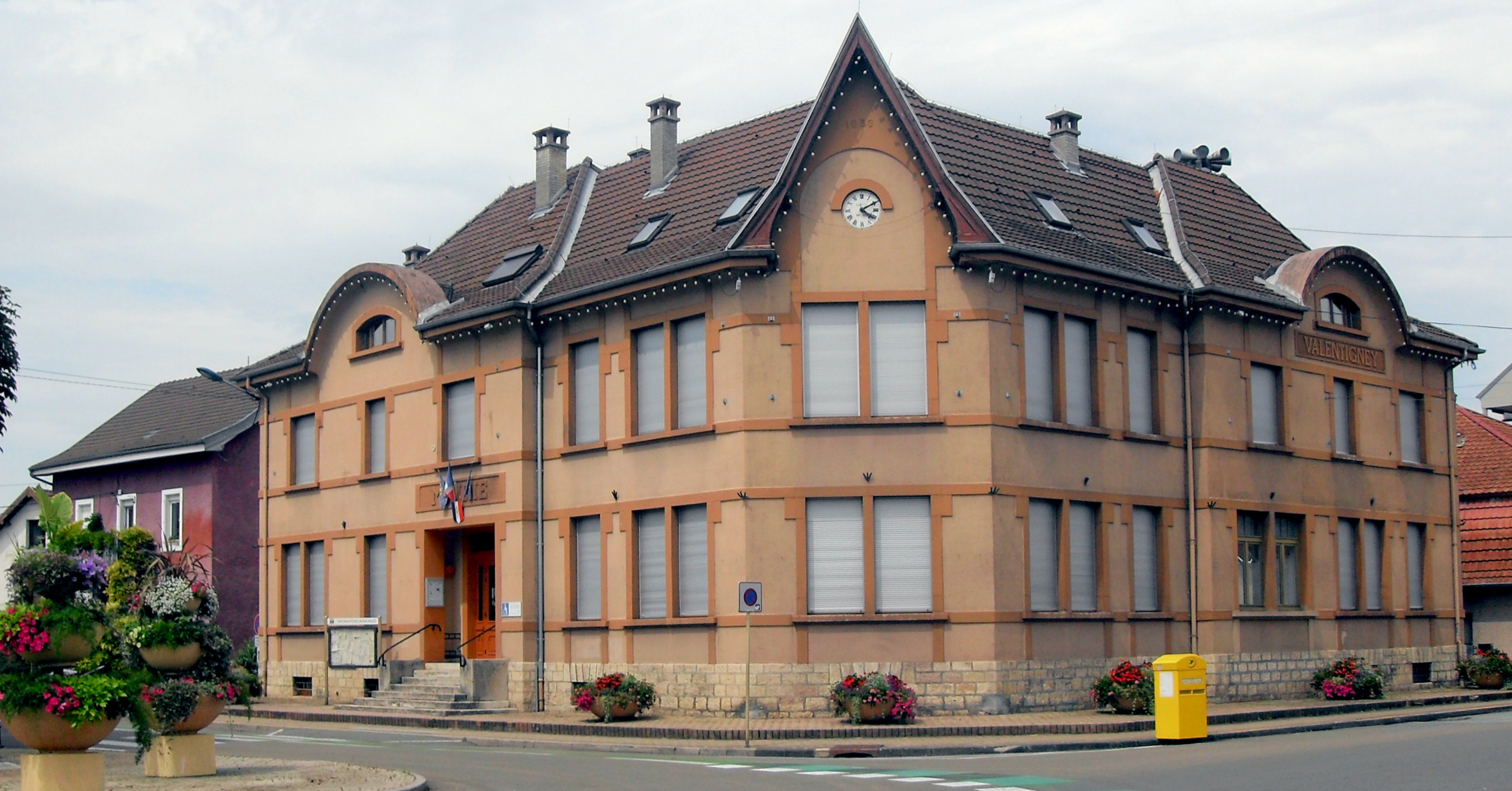
- The town hall in Valentigney

- Coat of arms
- Location of Valentigney
- Location within France Location within Bourgogne-Franche-Comté
- Coordinates: 47°27′48″N 6°49′59″E
- Country: France
- Region: Bourgogne-Franche-Comté
- Department: Doubs
- Arrondissement: Montbéliard
- Canton: Valentigney
- Intercommunality: Pays de Montbéliard Agglomération

Government
  - Mayor (2020–2026): Philippe Gautier
- Area^{1}: 9.74 km^{2} (3.76 sq mi)
- Highest elevation: 440 m (1,440 ft)
- Lowest elevation: 317 m (1,040 ft)
- Population (2023): 10,501
  - Density: 1,080/km^{2} (2,790/sq mi)
- Time zone: UTC+01:00 (CET)
  - Summer (DST): UTC+02:00 (CEST)
- INSEE/Postal code: 25580 /25700
- ^{1} French Land Register data, which excludes lakes, ponds, glaciers > 1 km^{2} (0.386 sq mi or 247 acres) and river estuaries.

Valentigney (French pronunciation: [valɑ̃ti'ɲɛ]) is a commune in the Doubs department in the Bourgogne-Franche-Comté region in eastern France.

Valentigney is best known as the place where Peugeot began operations; several members of the Peugeot family still live in the area.

During the 19th century and into the early 20th century, many Montbeliardaise from Valentigney and neighboring areas immigrated to northwest Ohio, particularly Williams County.

== Population ==
Historical population

| Year | Pop. | ±% p.a. |
|---|---|---|
| 1793 | 472 | — |
| 1800 | 189 | −12.26% |
| 1806 | 516 | +18.22% |
| 1821 | 612 | +1.14% |
| 1831 | 808 | +2.82% |
| 1836 | 883 | +1.79% |
| 1841 | 976 | +2.02% |
| 1846 | 1,002 | +0.53% |
| 1851 | 1,016 | +0.28% |
| 1856 | 1,023 | +0.14% |
| 1861 | 1,272 | +4.45% |
| 1866 | 1,331 | +0.91% |
| 1872 | 1,573 | +2.82% |
| 1876 | 2,014 | +6.37% |
| 1881 | 2,223 | +1.99% |
| 1886 | 2,530 | +2.62% |
| 1891 | 2,823 | +2.22% |
| 1896 | 3,493 | +4.35% |
| 1901 | 4,124 | +3.38% |

| Year | Pop. | ±% p.a. |
|---|---|---|
| 1906 | 4,367 | +1.15% |
| 1911 | 5,001 | +2.75% |
| 1921 | 5,115 | +0.23% |
| 1926 | 5,579 | +1.75% |
| 1931 | 5,875 | +1.04% |
| 1936 | 5,488 | −1.35% |
| 1946 | 5,256 | −0.43% |
| 1954 | 5,723 | +1.07% |
| 1962 | 11,241 | +8.80% |
| 1968 | 12,895 | +2.31% |
| 1975 | 14,894 | +2.08% |
| 1982 | 14,362 | −0.52% |
| 1990 | 13,133 | −1.11% |
| 1999 | 12,486 | −0.56% |
| 2007 | 11,484 | −1.04% |
| 2012 | 10,513 | −1.75% |
| 2017 | 10,714 | +0.38% |
| 2023 | 10,501 | −0.33% |

Source: EHESS and INSEE (1968-2023)

== See also ==
- Communes of the Doubs department
