= Armand Peugeot =

French industrialist (1849–1915)

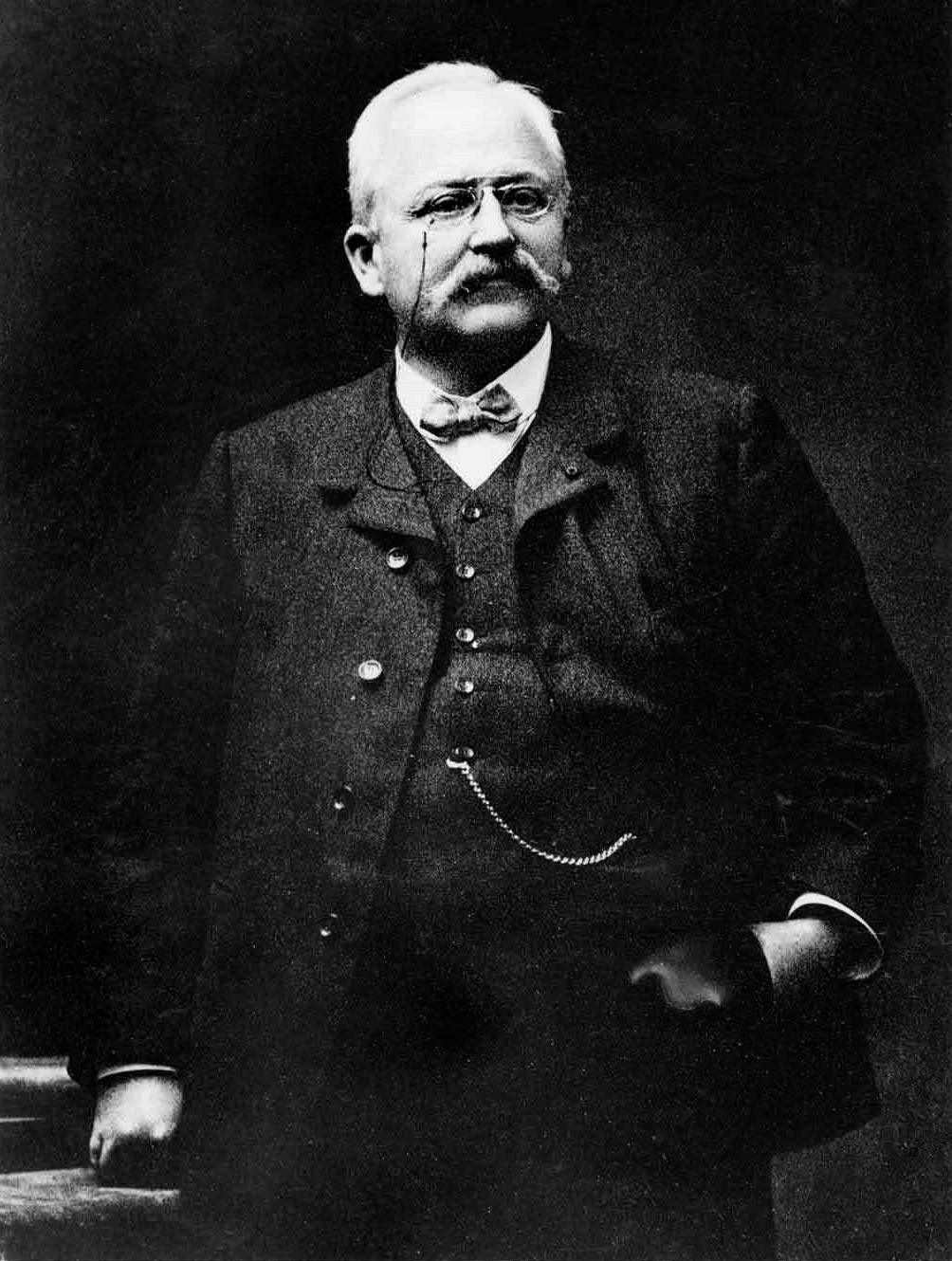
- Peugeot in 1889
- Born: 17 September 1849; Hérimoncourt, France
- Died: 4 February 1915 (aged 65); Neuilly-sur-Seine, France
- Education: École Centrale Paris
- Occupation: Businessman
- Known for: Founder of Peugeot automobiles

Armand Peugeot (French: [aʁmɑ̃ pøʒo]; 18 February 1849 – 4 February 1915) was a French industrialist, pioneer of the automobile industry and the man who transformed Peugeot into a manufacturer of bicycles and, later, of automobiles. He was accepted into the Automotive Hall of Fame in 1999.

== Family ==
Born in 1849 into a Protestant family at Hérimoncourt, in eastern France, Armand Peugeot was the son of Emile Peugeot and grandson of Jean-Pierre Peugeot. The family had a metal working business, producing a range of practical goods such as springs, saws, spectacle frames and coffee grinders. In 1872, he married Sophie Leonie Fallot (1852–1930) and they had five children, but their only son, Raymond, died in 1896. Armand Peugeot died on 2 January 1915 in Neuilly-sur-Seine, near Paris.

== Education ==
He was a graduate of the École Centrale Paris, a prestigious engineering school in France. In 1881, Peugeot travelled to England where he saw the potential of bicycles and their manufacture.

== Business ==
From 1865, Peugeot and his second cousin Eugène became involved with the running of the company, then called Peugeot Frères Aînés. They took it into cycle manufacture in 1882, and exhibited a steam-powered tricycle at the 1889 World Fair in Paris. They created their first car in their workhouse which is located in eastern France.

By 1892, the company name was Les Fils de Peugeot Frères, and they had begun to manufacture cars with Daimler engines. Armand Peugeot wanted to increase production, but Eugène did not want to commit the company to the necessary investment. So, on 2 April 1896, Peugeot set up his own company, Société Anonyme des Automobiles Peugeot. He built a factory at Audincourt, dedicated to the manufacture of cars with an internal combustion engine.

In February 1910, without a male heir, he agreed to merge his company with Eugène’s. When he stepped down from managing the company in 1913, Peugeot were the largest car manufacturer in France, producing 10,000 cars per year.

== Honours and awards ==
Officier of the Order of Legion of Honour
