= Peugeot 301 (1932–1936) =

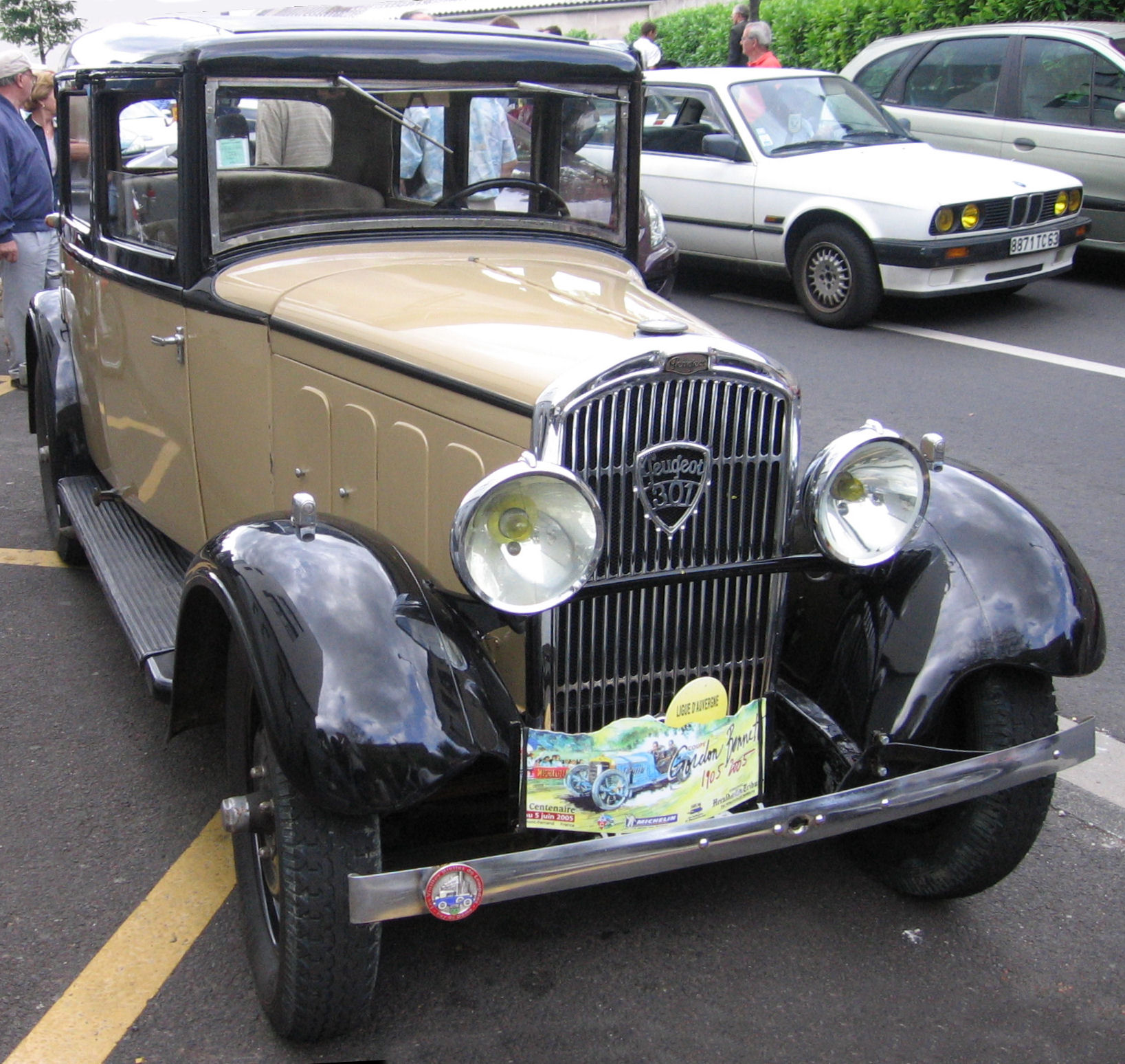
- Peugeot 301 saloon

Overview
- Manufacturer: Peugeot SA
- Production: 1932–1936; 70,497 produced

Body and chassis
- Class: Large family car (D)
- Body style: 4-door saloon 2-door cabriolet 2-door coupé 3-door van
- Layout: FR layout

Powertrain
- Engine: 1465 cc straight-four

Dimensions
- Length: 4,000 mm (157.5 in) - 4,800 mm (189.0 in) (approx)
- Width: 1,440 mm (56.7 in) - 1,600 mm (63.0 in)
- Height: 1,480 mm (58.3 in) - 2,450 mm (96.5 in)

Chronology
- Predecessor: Peugeot Type 177
- Successor: Peugeot 302

The Peugeot 301 is a four-cylinder large family car produced by Peugeot between 1932 and 1936.

The original 301 can be seen either as a belated replacement for the Type 177, which had not been on sale since 1928, or as a return by Peugeot to that market segment after having left it for four years.

It was replaced in 1936 by the Peugeot 302.

== The body ==
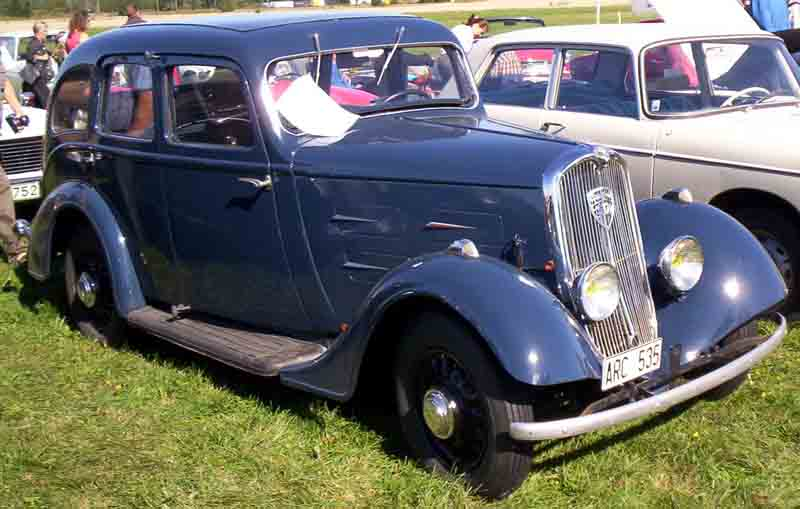
Peugeot 301 saloon

The 301C saloon produced in 1932 and 1933 featured a six-light (three windows on each side with a rear quarter window) four-door boxy body, with space at the back for a separate boot. Slightly longer-bodied versions without the separate luggage box were also available. The 301 CR introduced to the Sochaux lines after the summer break of 1933 was less angular, and the word "aérodynamique" featured prominently in Peugeot's publicity for the restyled car. Another, bolder change to the look of the saloon came with the introduction of the 301D in 1934. The 301D was no longer a six-light saloon, and it featured a longer sloping tail which suggested the streamlining of the Peugeot 402 and 302 which would appear during the following two years.

A variety of four-door 301s constructed on the same 2,720 mm (107.1 in) chassis were produced, although a longer 2,940 mm (115.7 in) wheelbase was also available for use, among other applications, as a taxicab with a middle set of seats that could be folded away ("strapontins"). There were also various 2-door versions which could be bodied as coupés or cabriolets.

A commercial version, the 301T, had a tall van body replacing the usual passenger cabin section directly behind the B pillar.

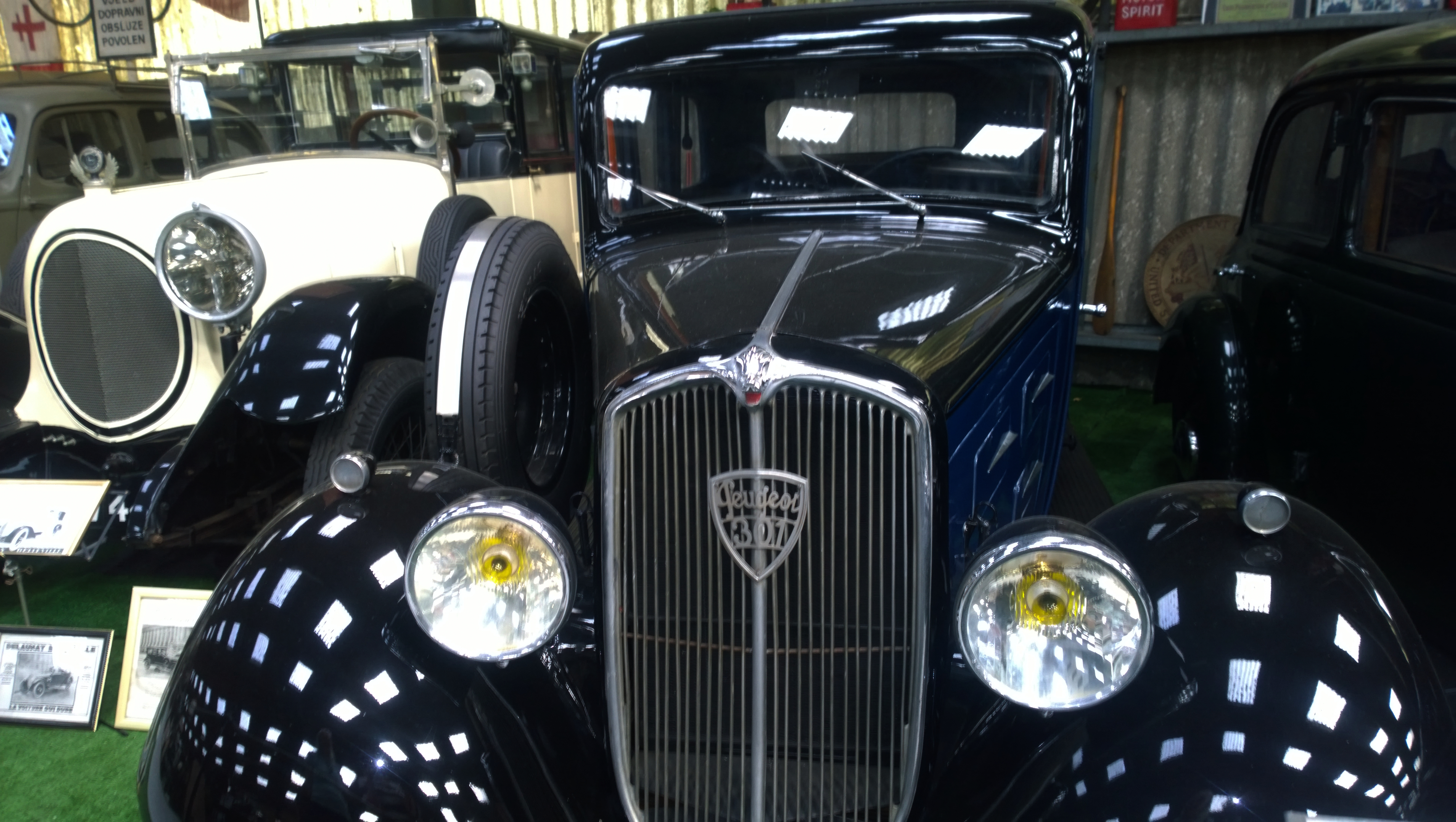
Vintage Peugeot 301 at the History on Wheels Museum, Eton Wick, Windsor, UK

== The engine ==
Despite the changes in body design over the lifetime of the Peugeot 301, the configuration of the engine remained the same: a four-cylinder water-cooled unit of 1465 cc. A maximum output of 35 bhp (26 kW) at 4000 rpm was stated for the 301D, with passenger car maximum speeds of between 80 km/h (50 mph) and 100 km/h (62 mph) according to body type. For the much taller 301 van the maximum speed did not exceed 70 km/h (44 mph). An electric starter motor was included, although, as was normal at the time, provision for manual cranking remained.

== Technical ==
The 301 was based on the underpinnings of the commercially more successful Peugeot 201, originally introduced in 1929. The rear wheels were driven via a three-speed manual transmission. There was no synchromesh.

The drum brakes were cable operated. The lights, controlled from a knob in the middle of the steering column, operated on a twelve-volt electrical system.

== Innovative suspension ==
The 301 was fitted with independent front suspension: it was one of the first volume produced cars to be thus equipped from launch, and benefited from exceptionally good road holding as well as greatly reduced vibration from the steering column by the standards of the time. Leaf springs at the rear were in line with contemporary practice.

== Commercial ==
The 301 competed in the 8 CV class in terms of fiscal horsepower, and sold approximately 70,000 units during its four-year model run.

== Sources and further reading ==
- Dedicated Peugeot 301 website (en français / in French but primarily showing figures and pictures)
