= Peugeot 201 =

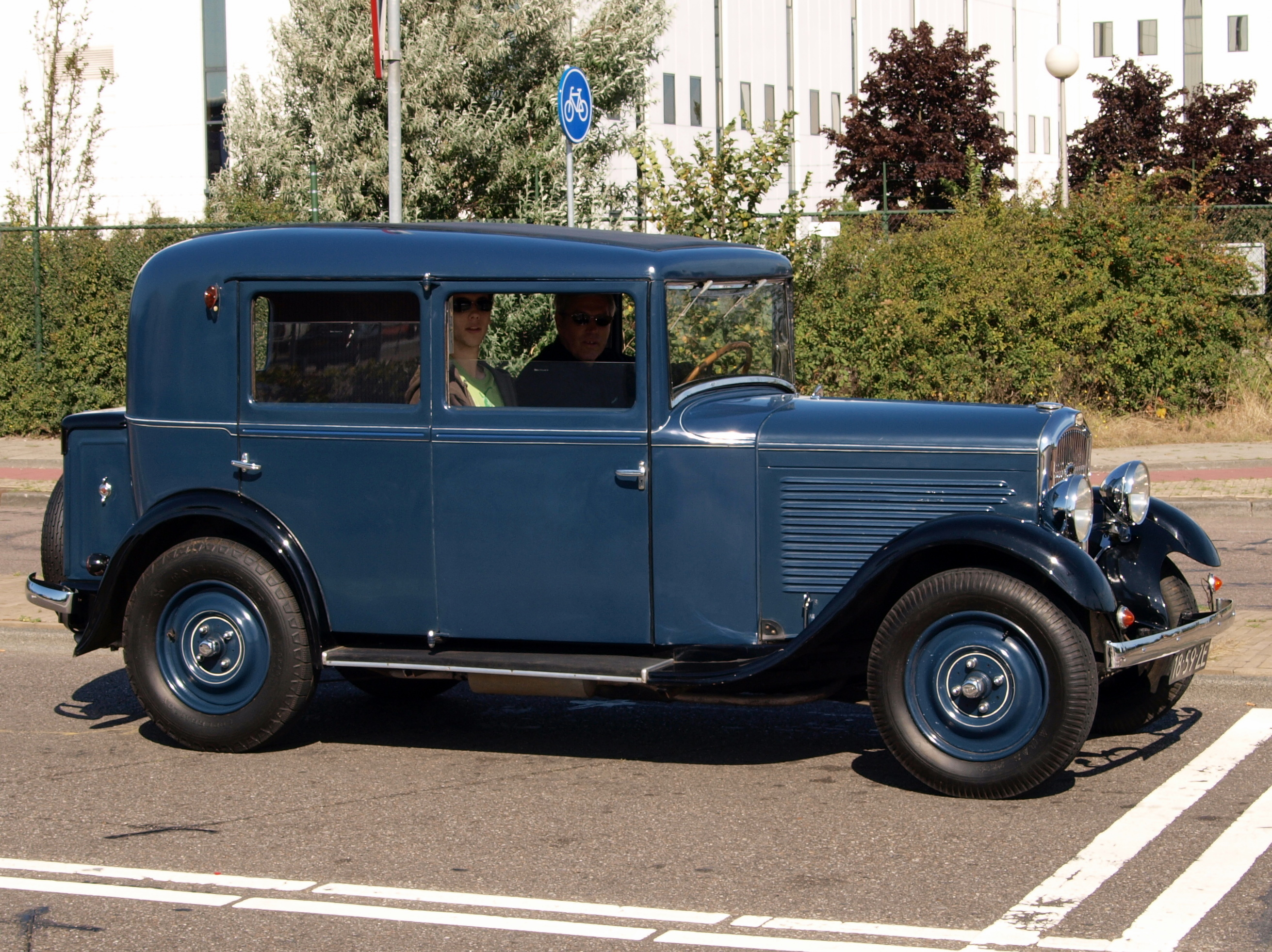
- Peugeot 201C

Overview
- Manufacturer: Peugeot SA
- Production: 1929–1937; 142,309 units
- Assembly: Sochaux, France

Body and chassis
- Body style: 4-door saloon other bodies available
- Layout: FR layout

Powertrain
- Engine: 1085 cc – 1465cc I4

Dimensions
- Wheelbase: 247 cm (97.2 in)
- Length: 3,800 mm (149.6 in)
- Width: 1,350 mm (53.1 in)
- Curb weight: 890 kg (1,962 lb)

Chronology
- Predecessor: Peugeot Type 190
- Successor: Peugeot 202

The Peugeot 201 is a car produced by Peugeot between 1929 and 1937.

The car was manufactured at the company's Sochaux plant near the Swiss frontier, and is today celebrated in the adjacent Peugeot museum. Although Peugeot had produced a petrol/gasoline-powered motor vehicle as early as 1886, the Peugeot 201 may reasonably be seen as the company's first mass-produced model.

== History ==
The Peugeot 201 was presented at the 1929 Paris Motor Show with the backdrop of the Wall Street crash. While many European manufacturers did not survive the ensuing depression, the 201's image as an inexpensive car helped Peugeot to survive the economic crisis with its finances intact and its status as a major auto producer confirmed.

== Models ==
During the 1930s Peugeot offered several variants of the 201, mostly with increasing engine capacity. The exception is the 1085 cc engine in the competition-oriented 201 S and CS. Presented in March 1932, 403 examples were built until July of the same year. The engine's stroke was shortened from 90 to 87 mm (3.54 to 3.43 in), with the 63 mm (2.48 in) bore remaining unchanged; power increased to 30 hp (22 kW).

Initially, the 201 range was powered by a 1122 cc engine developing 23 hp (17 kW) at 3500 rpm (top speed: 80 km/h / 50 mph). This was followed by a 28 hp (21 kW) engine of 1307 cc in September 1934, when the revised 201 D (and the longe wheelbase DL light truck derivative) were introduced. The D models also benefitted from a fully synchronized transmission. The final development was when the 201 M was presented in August 1936. This model was not a 201 per se, it was a decontented version of the recently discontinued 301. At the same time, that model was replaced by the new 302. The 201 M kept the 301's 1465 cc unit of 35 hp (26 kW) and could reach a claimed top speed of 100 km/h (62 mph).

The Peugeot 201 C, launched in 1931, is claimed to be the first mass-produced car equipped with independent front suspension, a concept rapidly adopted by the competition. The simpler beam front axle version remained available, but the optional independent suspension system reportedly improved road holding and reduced steering column vibration.

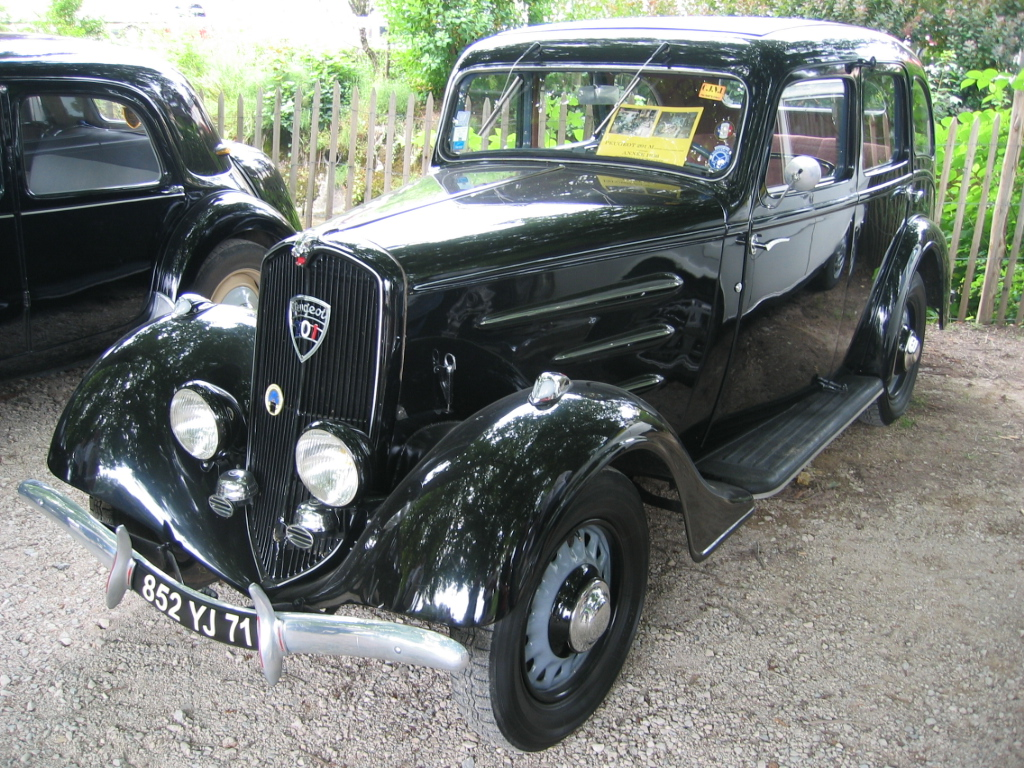
The 201 was typical of many western European family saloons in the 1930's where the standard body was redesigned to incorporate new ideas about streamlining.

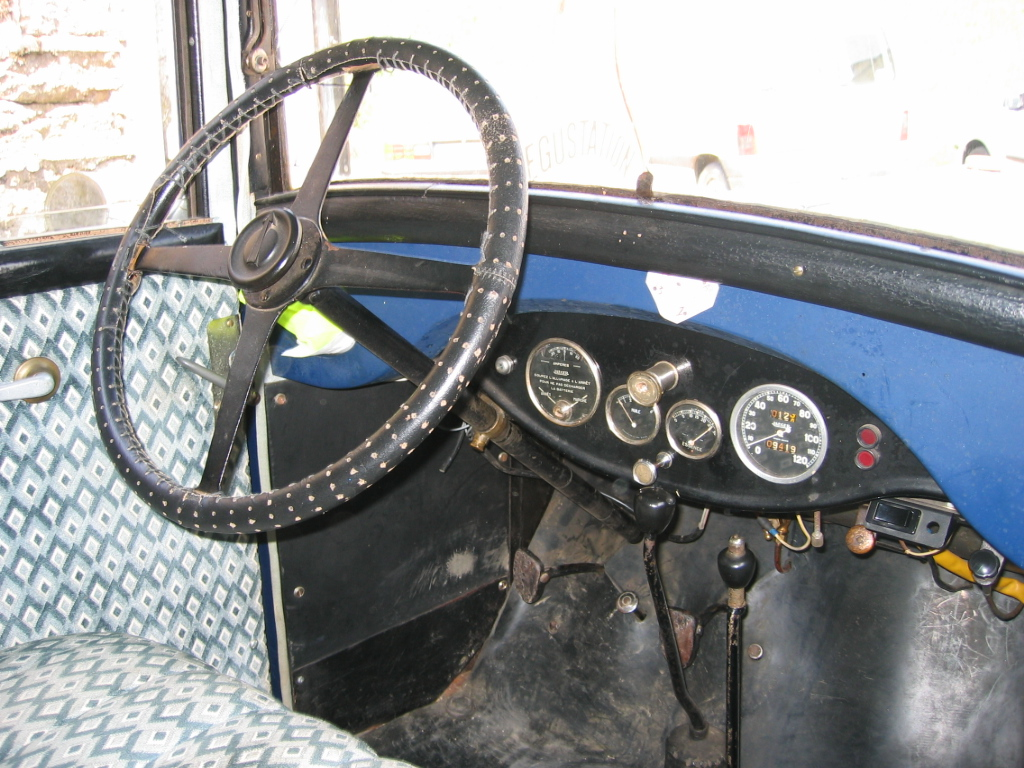
Interior

== Naming ==
In the early twentieth century, car manufacturers paid little attention to the naming of their vehicles. The 201's predecessor, the Type 190, is so named because it was the 190th distinct design developed by Peugeot. However, at the time few customers would have been aware of the name "Type 190". Even in the company's own brochures, the car now known as the Type 190 was simply called "La 5CV Peugeot" (The Peugeot 5 hp).

For Peugeot, a new naming scheme was introduced when the Type 190 was replaced by Peugeot 201. The 201 was the first Peugeot to carry a name comprising three numerals with a central zero, a naming scheme continued with the 301 and 401. Peugeot took effective steps to protect all such automobile names, to the discomfiture of Porsche in the 1960s as they prepared to launch their new 901 model. The name of the Ferrari 308 was not a problem.

== Light commercials ==
Between 1931 and 1933 the company produced 1,676 commercial versions of the 201, aimed at small shopkeepers and other businessmen. A wide range of body types was produced including a flatbed truck, a "bakers' van" and light vans with and without side windows behind the B-pillar.

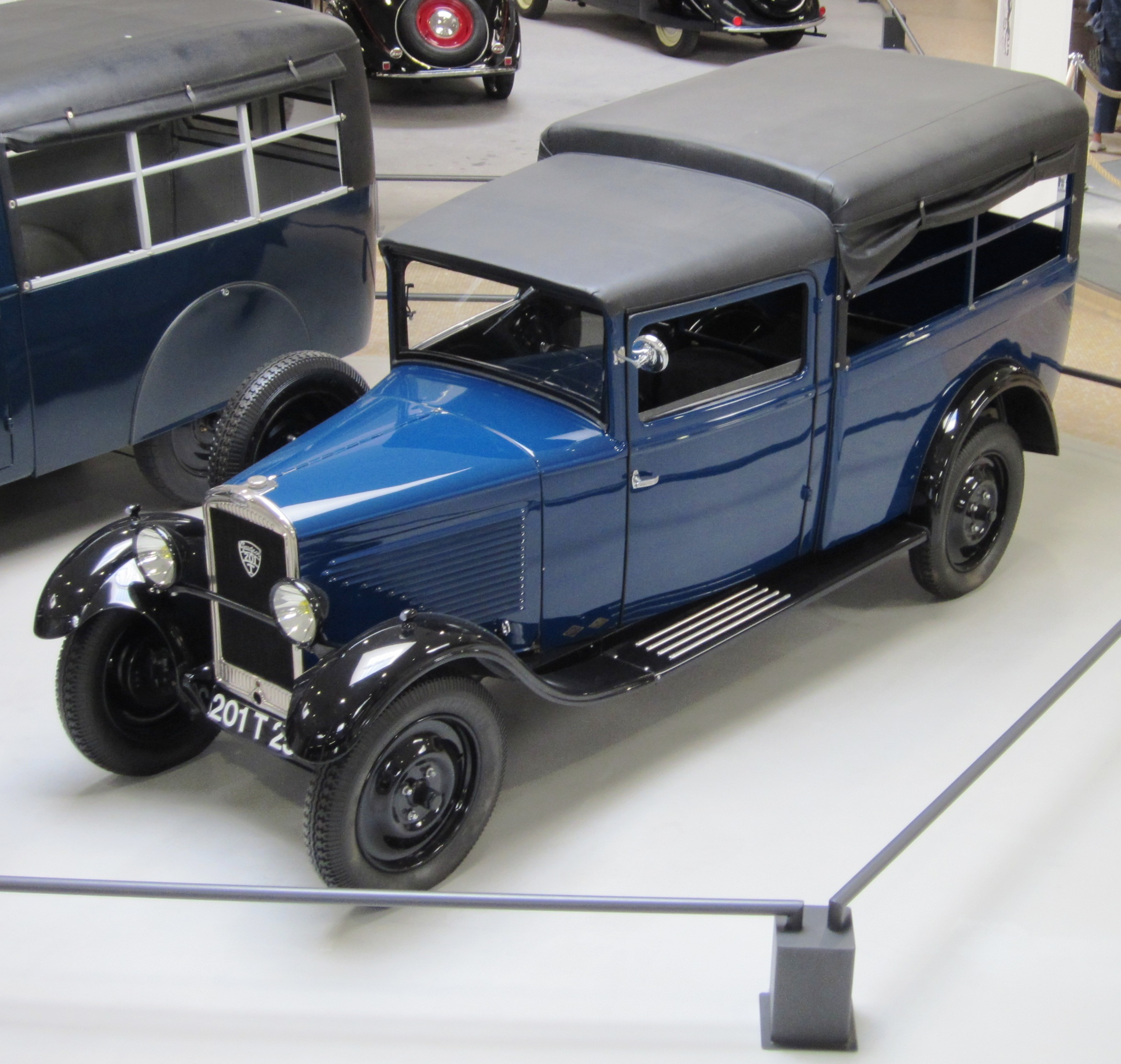
During the early 1930s, panel van and light truck versions were also produced.

== Sources ==
- Auto passion, nbr 37, juillet 1990
- Rétro hebdo, nbr 28, septembre 1997
- Rétroviseur ISSN 0992-5007, nbr 58
