= Peugeot DMA =

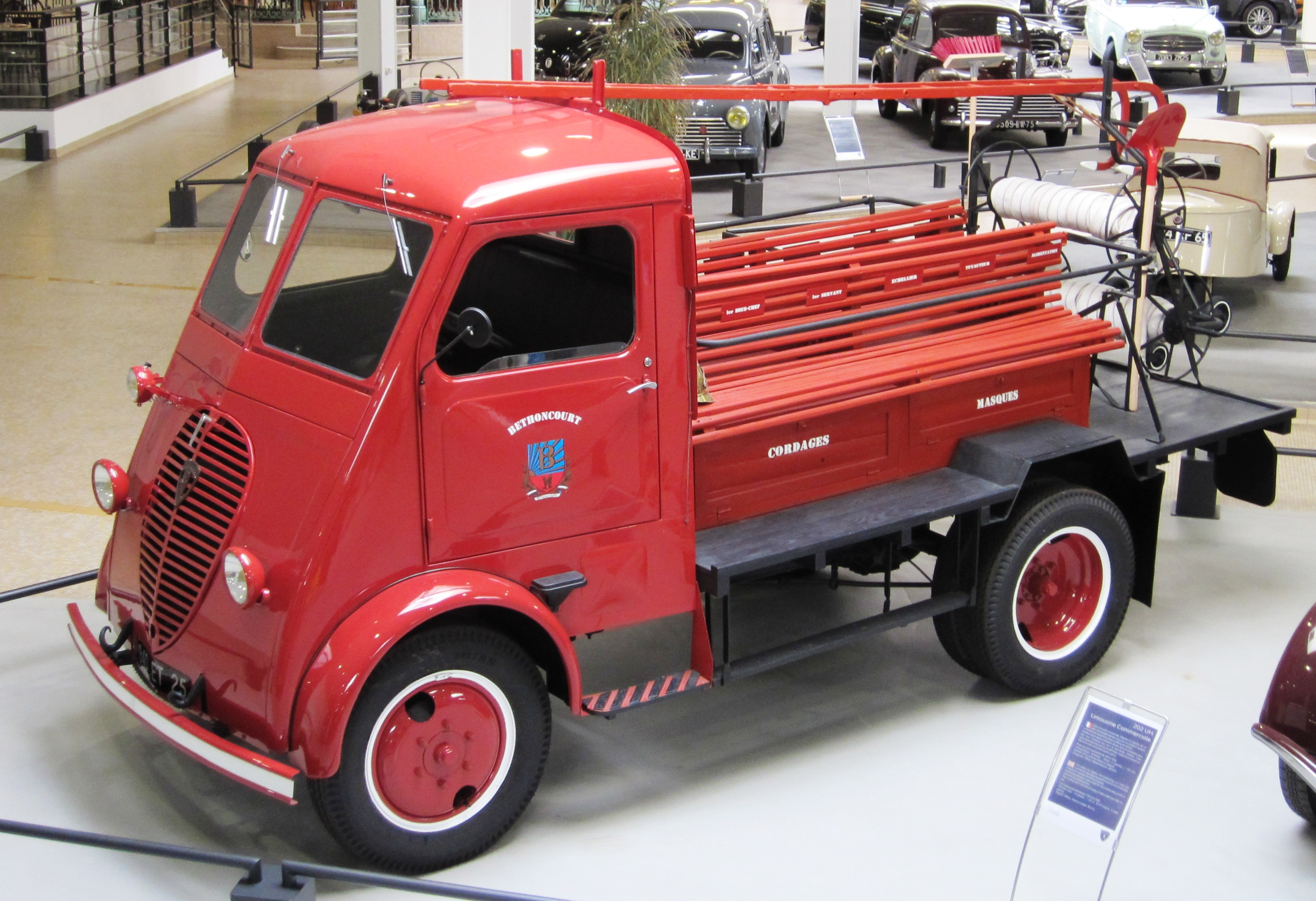
- Peugeot DMAH (1948)

Overview
- Manufacturer: Peugeot
- Production: Sochaux; 1941-1948; 11,045 units

Body and chassis
- Class: Light truck
- Body style: Various truck based configurations
- Layout: FR layout
- Related: Peugeot 402

Chronology
- Successor: Peugeot D3

The Peugeot DMA was a light truck built by Peugeot between 1941 and 1948. It was the first commercial vehicle from Peugeot to employ a forward control cab, whereby the driver sat right at the front of the vehicle. The configuration maximised load deck length and gave the driver a good view of the road, but it meant that the driver shared his cab with the engine: Peugeot's light truck, being a rear-wheel drive vehicle, was unable to offer a large low flat load area as the front-wheel drive Citroën TUB light van.

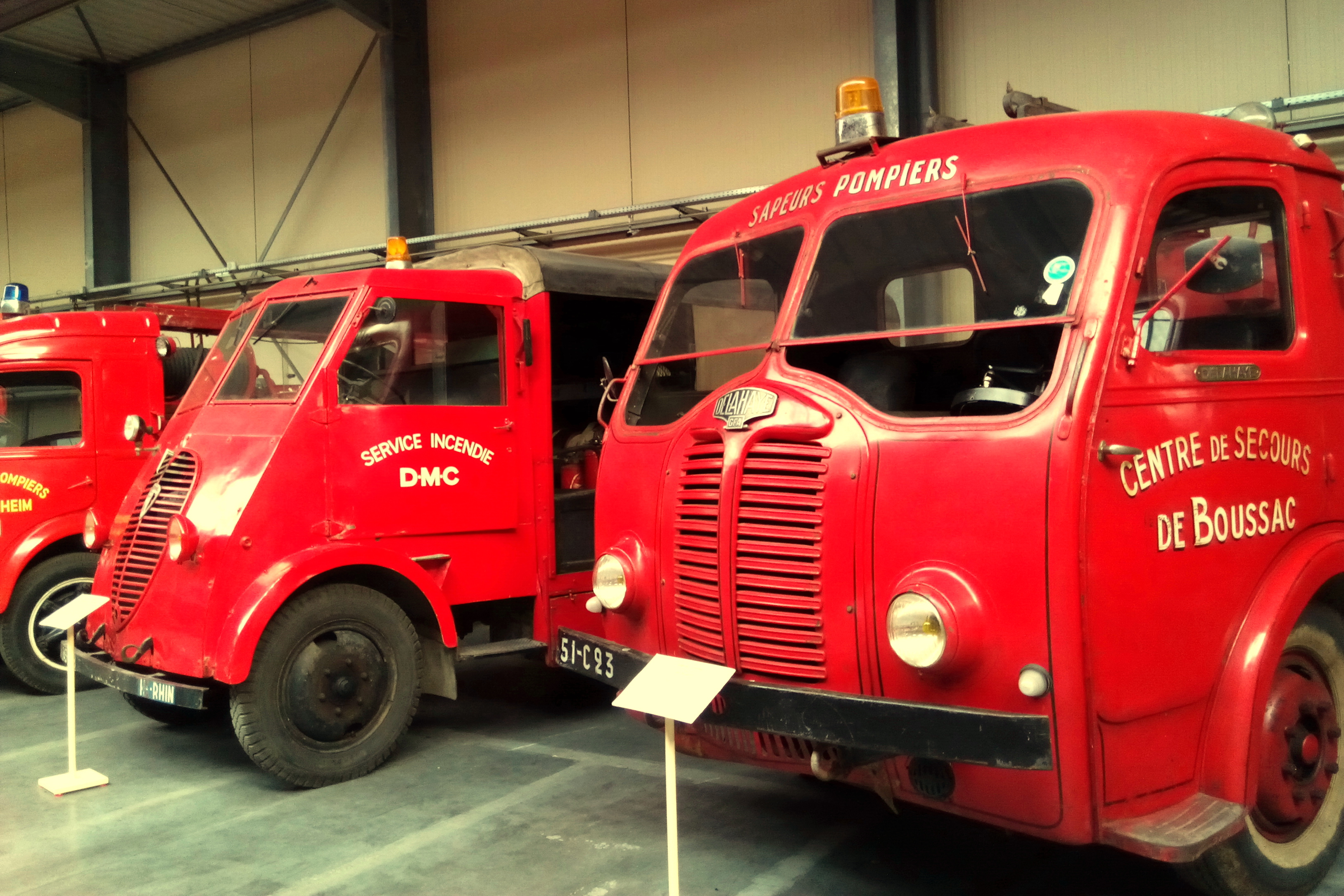
Peugeot DMA (behind a Delahaye Type 163); the initial model had sliding glass windows and plain sheet metal bodywork.

During the DMA's early years France was under German occupation, Peugeot's own plant being located in the strip of land known as the zone interdite with the Swiss frontier to the east and occupied northern France to the west. Most of the DMA trucks produced during the war were used by the German army. However, in the immediate postwar years, with funds for new models desperately restricted, the truck was brought back into production for use by French operators such as local fire services.

The 2,142 cc petrol engine came from the Peugeot 402 and could be adapted to work using charcoal-derived gazogène, applying technology in which Peugeot had developed an expertise in the late 1930s as the prospect of war, with its accompanying shortages of petrol/gasoline for non-military use, loomed. The gazogène-powered model was called DMAG.

The claimed maximum power output (using petrol/gasoline and with an Alpax aluminium alloy head) was 50 PS (37 kW; 49 bhp) with a top speed of 70 km/h (43 mph). Due to materials shortages during the war, there was also a version with a cast-iron head which produced 45 PS (33 kW; 44 bhp). The DMA featured twin rear wheels which enabled an impressive maximum load capacity of 2,000 kg (4,400 lb).

Wartime production under German control (mainly for the German armed forces, who commandeered 13,779 examples) lasted from March 1941 until September 1944; 15,306 examples were built in this series. Production of the DMA restarted in June 1945 and continued unchanged until September 1946, with 8,046 examples built. It was replaced by the updated DMAH version; the "H" reflected an update from mechanical to hydraulic brakes (by Lockheed). The DMAH also received sundry additional updates such as roll-down windows and pressed-steel bodywork. From March 1947, hydraulic shock absorbers were installed up front in lieu of the earlier friction dampers.

The DMAH was revised in 1948 and became the Peugeot Q3A light truck. Two years later the light commercial slot was filled by a van, the Peugeot D3, which, fitted with a Peugeot engine, had entered the Peugeot range in 1950 with the acquisition of the cash-strapped Chenard-Walcker business.
