= Peugeot D3 and D4 =

Peugeot D3 Peugeot D4
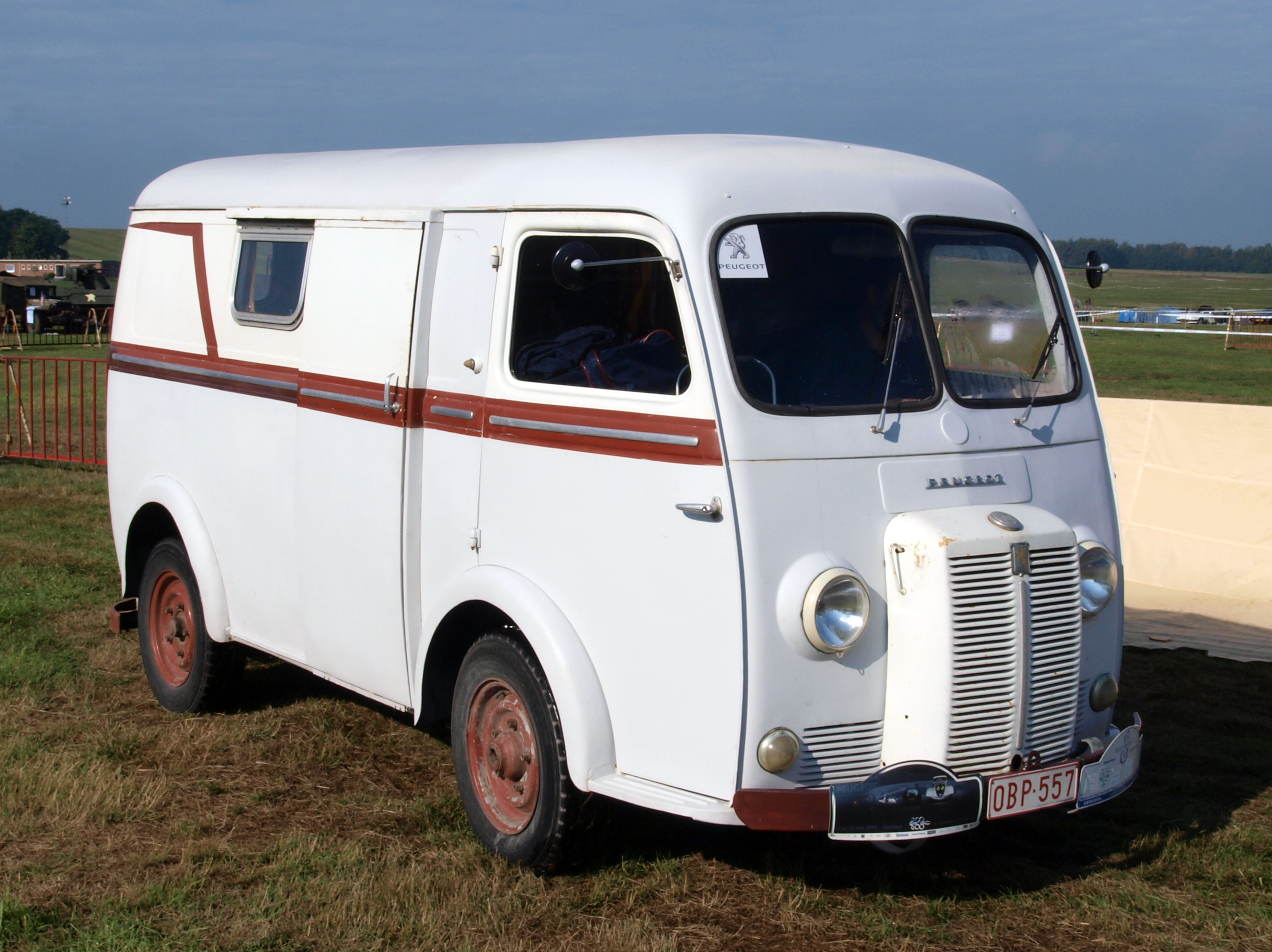

Overview
- Manufacturer: Chenard-Walcker (1946–1950); Peugeot (1950–1965)
- Also called: Chenard-Walcker CPV
- Production: 1947–1950 (Chenard-Walcker); 1950–1965 (Peugeot) approx 76,000 produced

Body and chassis
- Class: panel van
- Layout: FF layout

Powertrain
- Engine: petrol: 1,290 cc I4 (D3); 1,468 cc I4 (D4); diesel: 1,816 cc

Dimensions
- Length: 4,430 mm (174.4 in)
- Width: 1,840 mm (72.4 in)
- Height: 2,110 mm (83.1 in)

Chronology
- Predecessor: Peugeot DMA
- Successor: Peugeot J7

The Peugeot D3 and its successor, the Peugeot D4 were forward control panel vans sold by Peugeot from October 1950 till 1965. The van originated as a front-wheel drive light van produced by Chenard-Walcker, whose business Peugeot had acquired by 1950.

== Chenard-Walcker CPV ==
The van, based on a wartime design, was relaunched, soon after the Liberation, in June 1946 as the Chenard-Walcker CPV. In this form it was powered by a two-cylinder water-cooled two-stroke engine of just 1,021 cc. Power output of 26 hp (19 kW) was claimed. Accepting that even by the standards of the time, this level of power was insufficient, in 1947 the manufacturers switched to using the 1,133 cc engine of the Peugeot 202, and claimed power increased to 30 hp (22 kW).

The original two-cylinder engine had the merit of being very compact; in order to accommodate the four-cylinder unit from Peugeot the nose of the van had to be extended, which compromised the clean frontal design of the original van and gave rise to the nickname Nez de cochon ("pig nose").

== Peugeot D3 ==
Providing van engines to Chenard-Walcker at a time when the business was short of cash made Peugeot a major creditor, placed at the front of the line of any potential purchasers of the business as it became apparent that Chenard-Walcker could not survive independently. Peugeot's acquisition of the business led to the van's rebranding as a Peugeot, although it was January 1951 before the Chenard et Walcker CP3 (as their CPV had by now become) was formally discontinued.

Power was also increased late in 1950 when the engine from the (by now no longer produced) Peugeot 202 was replaced by the 1,290 cc engine of the recently introduced Peugeot 203. The D3 was redesignated as the D3A. Already the engine change enabled Peugeot to advertise the van's power output as 32 hp (24 kW), and during the next few years the vehicle benefited from further enhancements as the engine was developed both for the van and for what was at the time the company's only passenger car. Power was increased to 40 hp (29 kW) in 1952, with the van renamed as the D3B. In February 1953 a passenger seat was fitted.

In 1955 Peugeot added a second model to their passenger car range, and the van acquired the 1,468 cc engine of the newly launched Peugeot 403, which even in the detuned state used for the commercial vehicle application provided 45 hp (33 kW) of power. Thus enhanced, in August 1955 the Peugeot D3 was replaced by the Peugeot D4. The new van was visually almost indistinguishable from the previous model except for "baguette-style" over-riders on the front bumper (discontinued in 1960), unless a new optional side-door for the load area had been fitted.

In October 1959 the D4 (like the 403) became available with a diesel engine, a major innovation. In 1960 the power from the petrol engine was increased to 55 hp (40 kW) – more than twice the power of the initial version – and the van was redesignated D4B. 1960 also saw a rearrangement of the exterior lights with the fitting of flashing direction indicators front and back. Further changes during the final five years were minor, one of the more noticeable ones being a small reduction, in 1963, of the number of bars on the front grille.

There was a range of body types, including those of a basic panel van, minibus, ambulance, and horse-box. A relatively popular horse-box conversion was undertaken by the Théault business at Avranches. Customers for the little minibus version included various French police forces and the French post office, which used the vans for transporting postmen.

The D4B was replaced by the Peugeot J7 in 1965.

== In popular culture ==
A D4 in police livery featured memorably in the original Pink Panther film, when Inspector Clouseau was driven away in one after being caught in possession of the eponymous diamond.

== Sources and further reading ==
- Negro, Patrick (March 2011), Les Fourgons "Nez de cochon" CPV, D3A, D4A et D4B de mon père ["Pig-nosed" trucks: the CPV, D3A, D4A, and D4B of yore] (in French), ETAI, p. 120, ISBN 978-2-84078-041-0

This entry includes information from the equivalent entry in the French wikipedia.
