= Peugeot Type 177 =

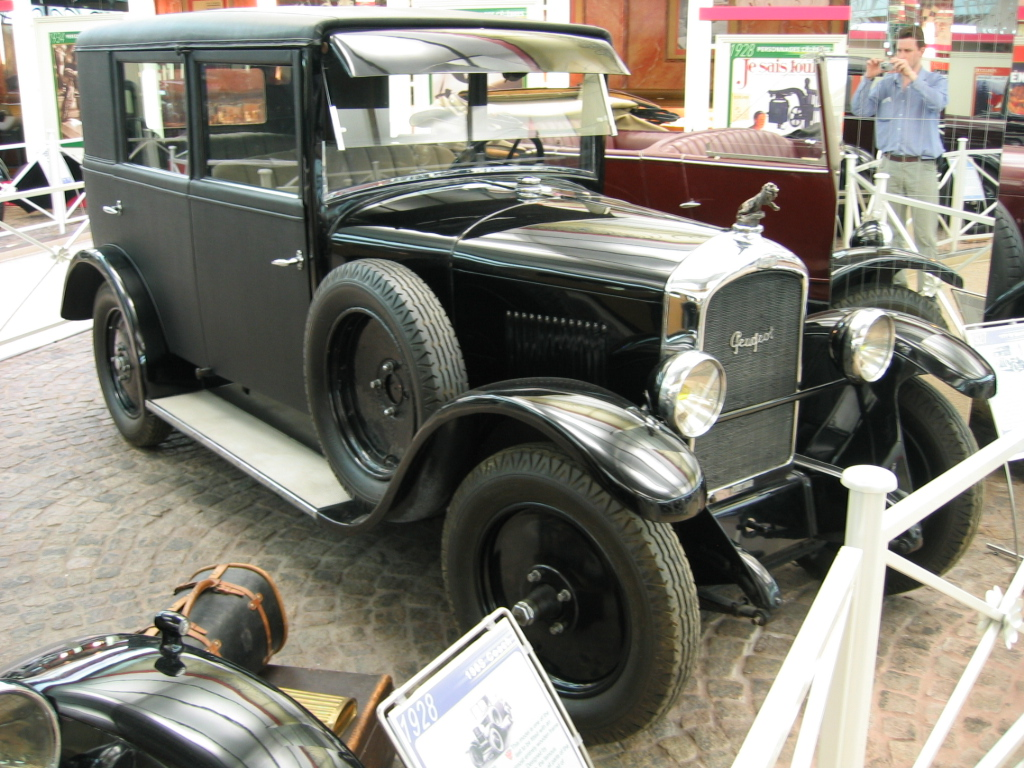

Overview
- Manufacturer: Peugeot
- Production: 1924–1929

Body and chassis
- Class: Small family car
- Layout: FR layout

Dimensions
- Wheelbase: 2670 mm 1924–1926; 2695 mm 1927–1929

Chronology
- Predecessor: Peugeot Type 173
- Successor: Peugeot 301

The Peugeot Type 177 B was a mid-range car produced between 1924 and 1929 by the French auto-maker Peugeot. With a fiscal horsepower of 10 CV, and a wheel base of 2670 mm, it competed in the same sector as the Citroën B2 and Renault KZ.

The car was derived from the Peugeot Type 173, from which it inherited its mechanical components and with which it shared both its overall dimensions and, when launched in 1924, its 1,525 cc ohv in-line four-cylinder engine. Claimed maximum power output was 29 hp at 1,900 rpm.

The car was available in three different equipment levels, designated B, BH and BL. A year after the launch, in 1925, of the Type 177, the Type 173 was delisted and the newer model took its place.

Also in 1925 the company launched the Peugeot Type 181, broadly similar to the 177, but with a slightly larger 1,615 cc engine for which a maximum power output of 30 hp and maximum speed of 75 km/h (47 mph) were given.

At the end of 1926 production of the three original versions of the 177 B came to an end. 16,039 had been produced. A replacement 177 was launched at the start of 1927, in the shape of the 177 M. The 177 M of 1927 was of particular interest because of its transparent roof, a feature which would become widespread as an option on many cars only some fifty years later.

This was replaced for the 1929 model year at the 22nd Paris Motor Show in October 1928 by the 177 R. The wheelbase was slightly longer at 2695 mm. Shortly afterwards the power unit was also changed, new cars featuring a smaller engine of 1,393 cc. This distanced the 177 from the more powerful Peugeot 181, leaving the new Type 177 with a maximum power output of only 25 hp, which was nevertheless sufficient to support a listed top speed of 70 km/h (44 mph).

The 177 and the more powerful 181 were commercially successful, with more than 40,000 177s produced. The 100,000th Peugeot produced was a Type 181, which was also one of the last cars produced at the company's Audincourt plant. Type 181 production continued until 1928, by when 9,259 had been produced.

The Type 177 continued to be offered for one more year, powered in its final year by larger the 1,615 cc engine hitherto reserved for the Type 181. By the time Type 177 production ended in 1929, a further 18,202 had been built.

== References and sources ==
- Wolfgang Schmarbeck: Alle Peugeot Automobile 1890–1990. Motorbuch-Verlag. Stuttgart 1990. ISBN 3-613-01351-7
