= Peugeot 202 =

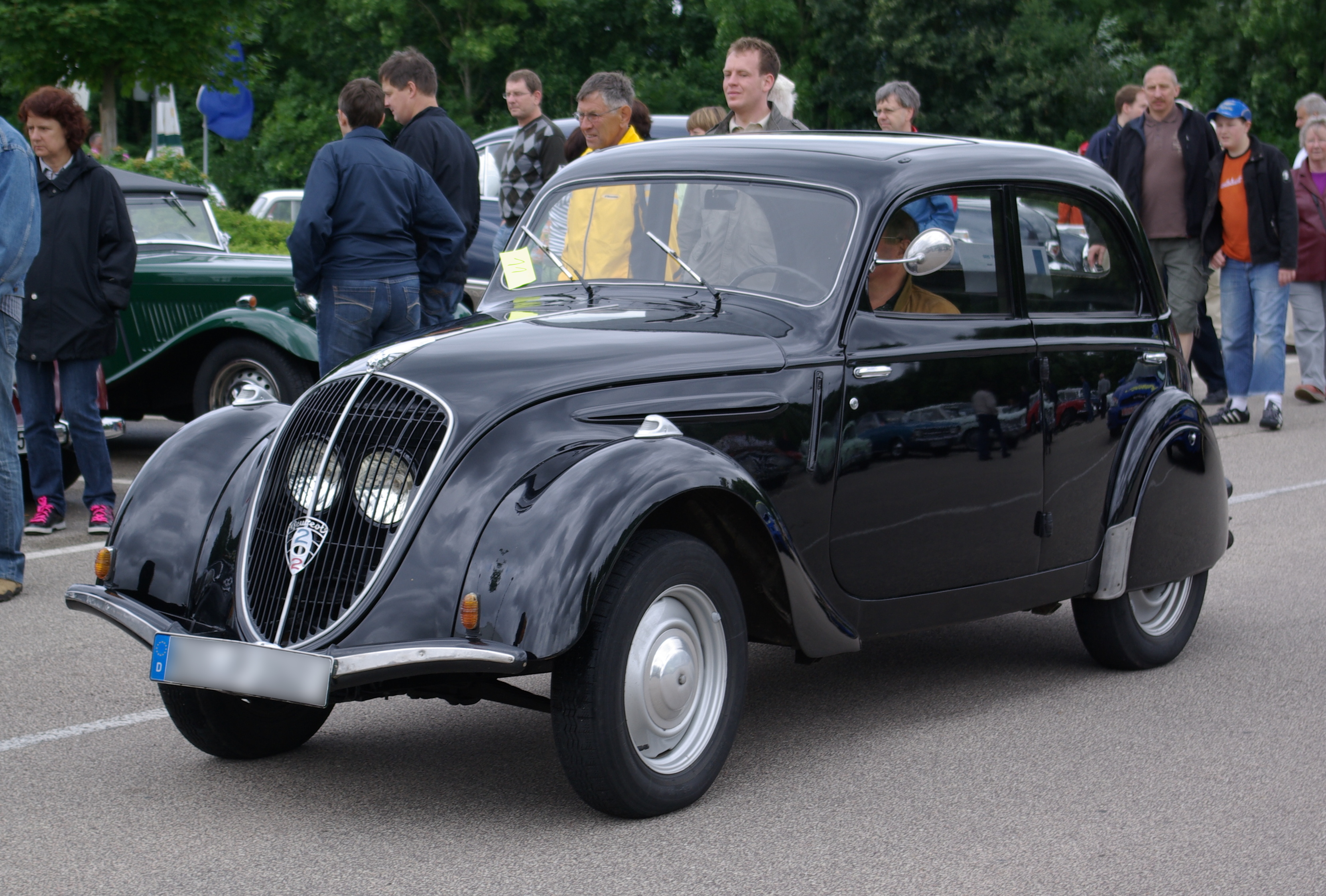

Overview
- Manufacturer: Peugeot SA
- Production: 1938–1942; 1945–1949; 104,126 produced
- Assembly: France: Sochaux (Sochaux Plant)

Body and chassis
- Class: Supermini (B)
- Body style: 4-door saloon; 2-door cabriolet; 4-door cabriolet; 2-door pickup
- Layout: FR layout

Powertrain
- Engine: 1133 cc I4
- Transmission: 3-speed manual with synchromesh on ratios 2 and 3.

Dimensions
- Wheelbase: 2,450 mm (96 in) (berline); 2,650 mm (104 in) (hatch)
- Length: 4,110 mm (162 in) (berline); 4,430 mm (174 in) (hatch)
- Width: 1,500 mm (59 in) (berline); 1,590 mm (63 in) (hatch)
- Height: 1,550 mm (61 in)
- Curb weight: 890 kg (1,960 lb) (approx)

Chronology
- Predecessor: Peugeot 201
- Successor: Peugeot 203

The Peugeot 202 is a supermini developed and designed by the French car manufacturer Peugeot. Production of the car ran between 1938 and 1942 and then, after a brief production run of 20 in early 1945, restarted in mid-1946. It was sold until 1949, by which time it had been replaced by the 203.

== Launch ==
Production started in January 1938, and the car was formally launched on 2 March 1938 with a dinner and presentation for the specialist press in the fashionable Bois de Boulogne district of Paris. The previous autumn, at the 1937 Paris Motor Show, Peugeot had staged a massive "referendum" among visitors to the show stand to find out what customers expected from the new small car then under development. It is not clear whether there would still have been time to incorporate any of the suggestions of the public in the car as launched, but the participative nature of the exercise certainly generated positive pre-launch publicity for the 202.

== The body ==
The steel bodied 202 was instantly recognisable as a Peugeot from the way that the headlights were set, as on the older 302, close together, in a protected location behind the front grille. Most customers chose the four-door berline (saloon) version which by 1948 came with a steel-panel sliding sun roof included in the price. However the boot/trunk was small and could be accessed only from within the car, there being no outside access. The two-seater two-door cabriolet "décapotable" did have a separate boot lid but cost approximately 30% more than the berline. Priced very closely to the berline, was a structurally similar four-door four-seater "berline découvrable", which featured a full fold away hood: this type of body would become difficult to provide using the monocoque body structure then becoming mainstream and which would be a feature of the Peugeot 203. Both the Peugeot 202 and the Peugeot 203 had front suicide doors.

Between 1947 and 1949 the manufacturer produced 3,015 timber bodied "hatch" (hatchback) conversions: this model cost 55% more than the berline, and anticipated future Peugeot policy by using a slightly longer chassis than that used on other 202 versions. The extensive use of timber took the company back to a technology that it had abandoned in 1931 when production of the Type 190 ended, and according to the manufacturer was above all a response to shortage of sheet steel in post-war France.

There were only two models offered in France in this class offering so wide a range of body types; the other was the still popular but soon to be replaced Simca 8.

== Chassis, engine and running gear ==
With the body removed, an eye catching aspect of the 202's chassis was the positioning of the battery, located below and ahead of the radiator (itself conventionally sited ahead of the engine). This arrangement, which made inspection or replacement of the battery exceptionally easy, was made possible by the "streamlined" sloping front grille, shared with the manufacturer's larger models introduced during the late 1930s, such as the Peugeot 402 and its derivative, the 302.

The 202 was powered by a 1133 cc water-cooled engine giving a maximum of 30 PS (22 kW) at 4000 rpm and a top speed of approximately 100 km/h (62 mph). Fuel-feed came via overhead valves, at a time when the most obvious competitor, the recently introduced Renault Juvaquatre, was still powered by a side-valve power unit. Power was transferred to the rear wheels by means of a three-speed manual transmission featuring synchromesh on the top two ratios.

Back in 1931 the 202's predecessor, the Peugeot 201, had been the first mass market volume model to feature independent front suspension. Independent front suspension, widely held to improve both the road holding and the ride of the car, was again incorporated on the new 202, meaning that this was a feature across the entire Peugeot range: the same claim could not be made for the range on offer from rival Renault.

As on the contemporary Citroën Traction, relatively elaborate "Pilote" style wheels, featuring alternating holes and structural metal support sections round the outside of the inner hub, were replaced by simpler (and cheaper to produce) pressed disc wheels when, following a heroic reconstruction effort at the Sochaux plant, production could be resumed in 1946 following the war.

== Improvements ==
Small improvements continued to be implemented almost until the point where production ended. Hydraulic brakes were a new feature for 1946. Shortly after this the dashboard was redesigned to incorporate a (very small) glove box. For 1948 the wheels were embellished with chrome plated hub caps and the car received redesigned hydraulic shock absorbers (which turned out to be of the design recently finalised for the forthcoming new 203 model).

A final fling, exhibited in October 1948 for the 1949 model year, was the Peugeot 202 "Affaires", a reduced specification version, with the heater removed and thinner tires fitted. The 202 Affaires also lost the sliding-steel-panel sunroof which by now had become a standard fitting on the regular 202 Berline (sedan/saloon). The list price was 320,000 Francs which represented a saving of more than 6% on the list price for the standard car. The bargain basement marketing may have helped clear accumulated component inventory, but the cabriolet version was nevertheless delisted shortly after the October 1948 Motor Show closed: by now commentators and potential customers were focused on the Peugeot 203, formally launched in 1948, by which time it had already been the subject of extensive pre-launch promotion and publicity by Peugeot for more than a year.

== Commercial ==
104,126 were built.

== Gallery ==
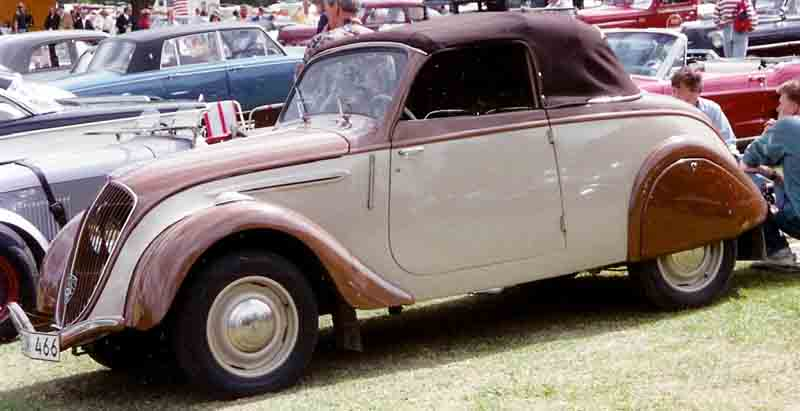
Peugeot 202 Coupé Décapotable (1948)

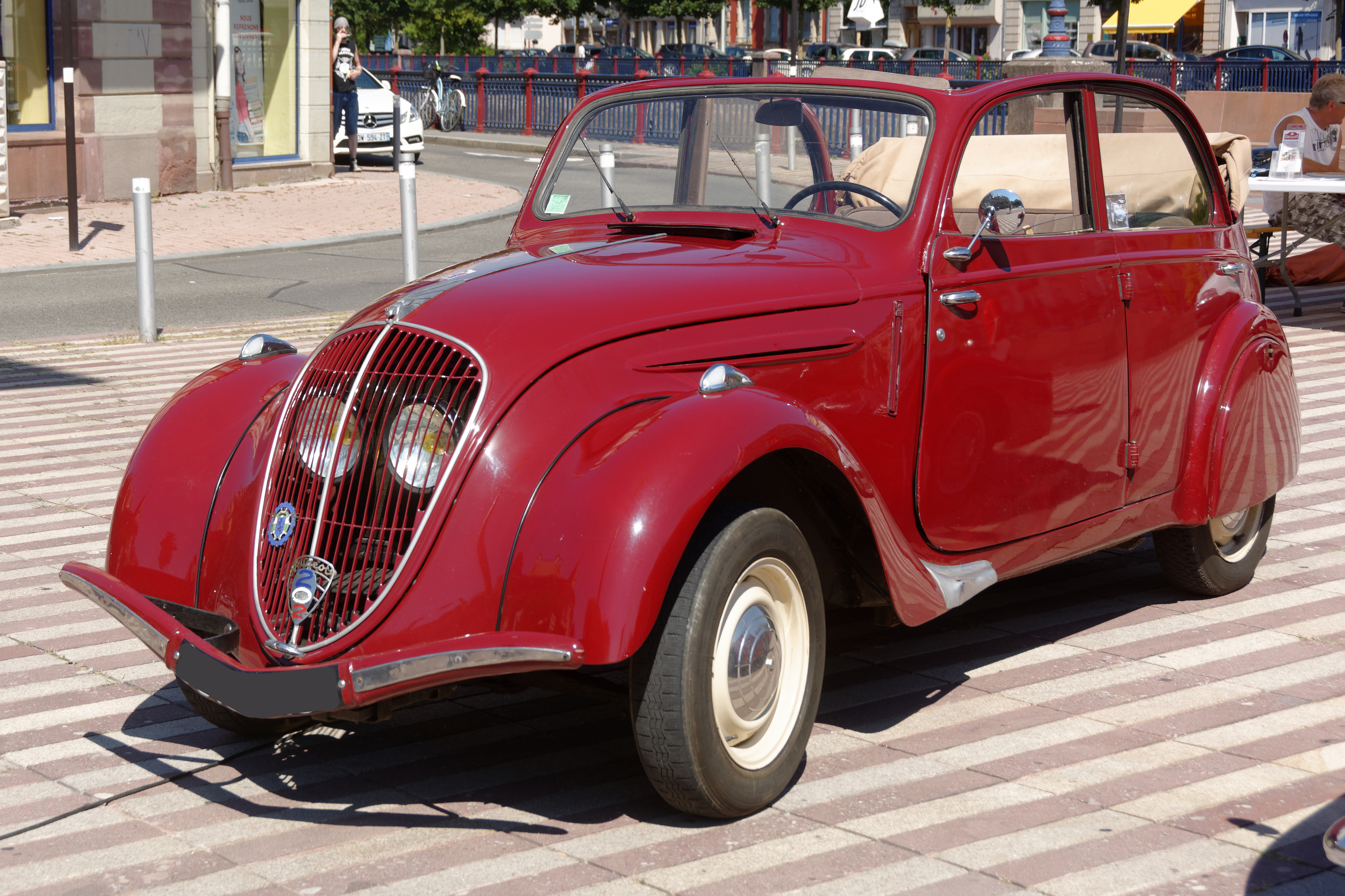
Peugeot 202 4-door La Berlina découvrable

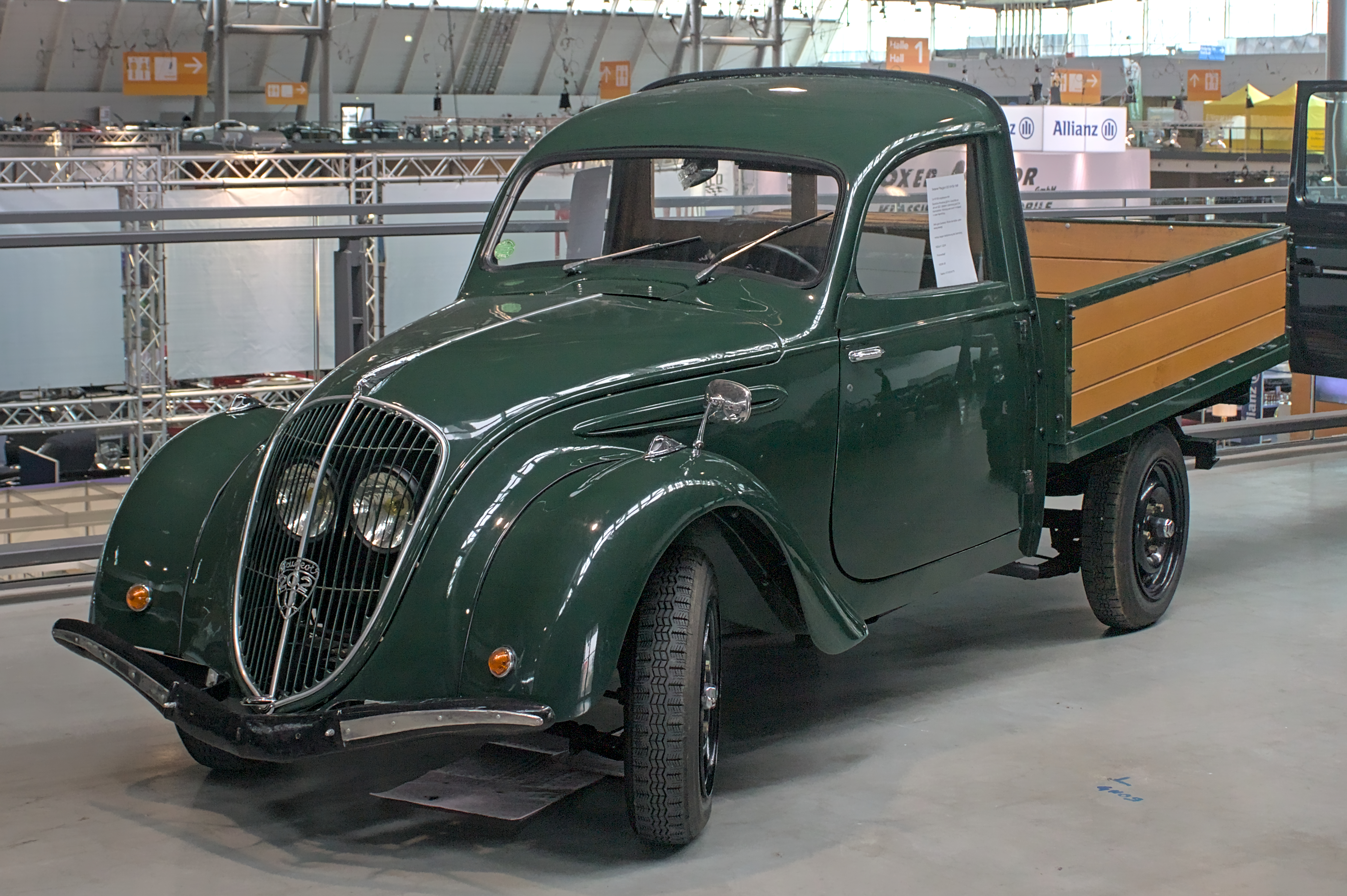
Peugeot 202 pickup

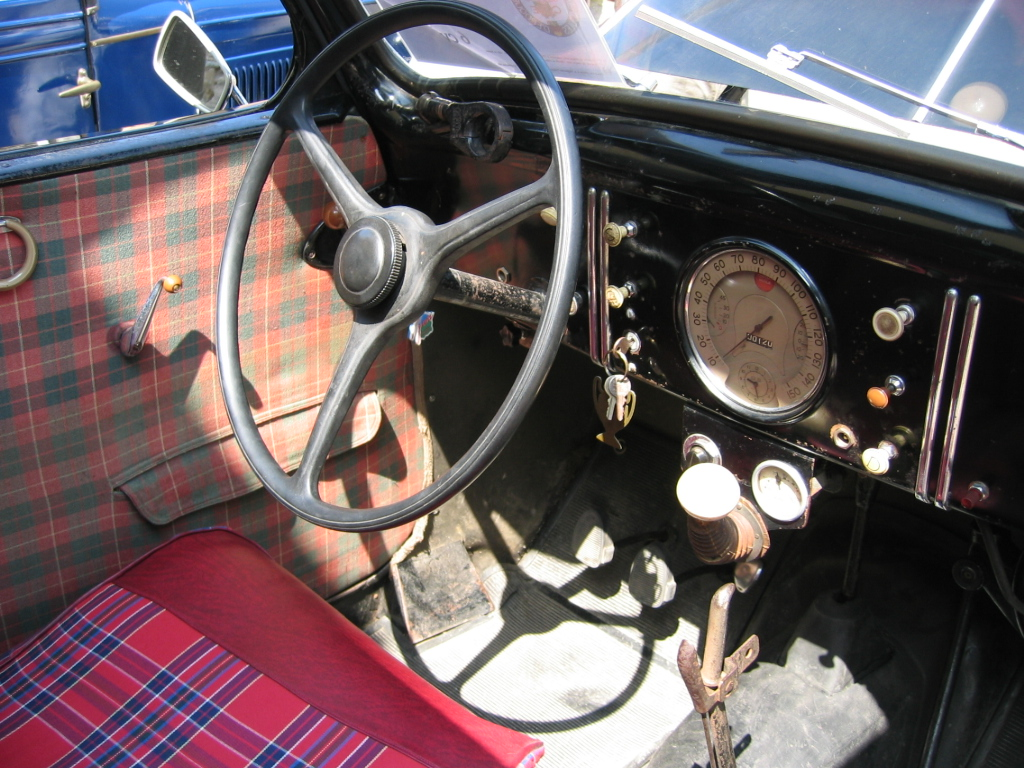
Peugeot 202 interior

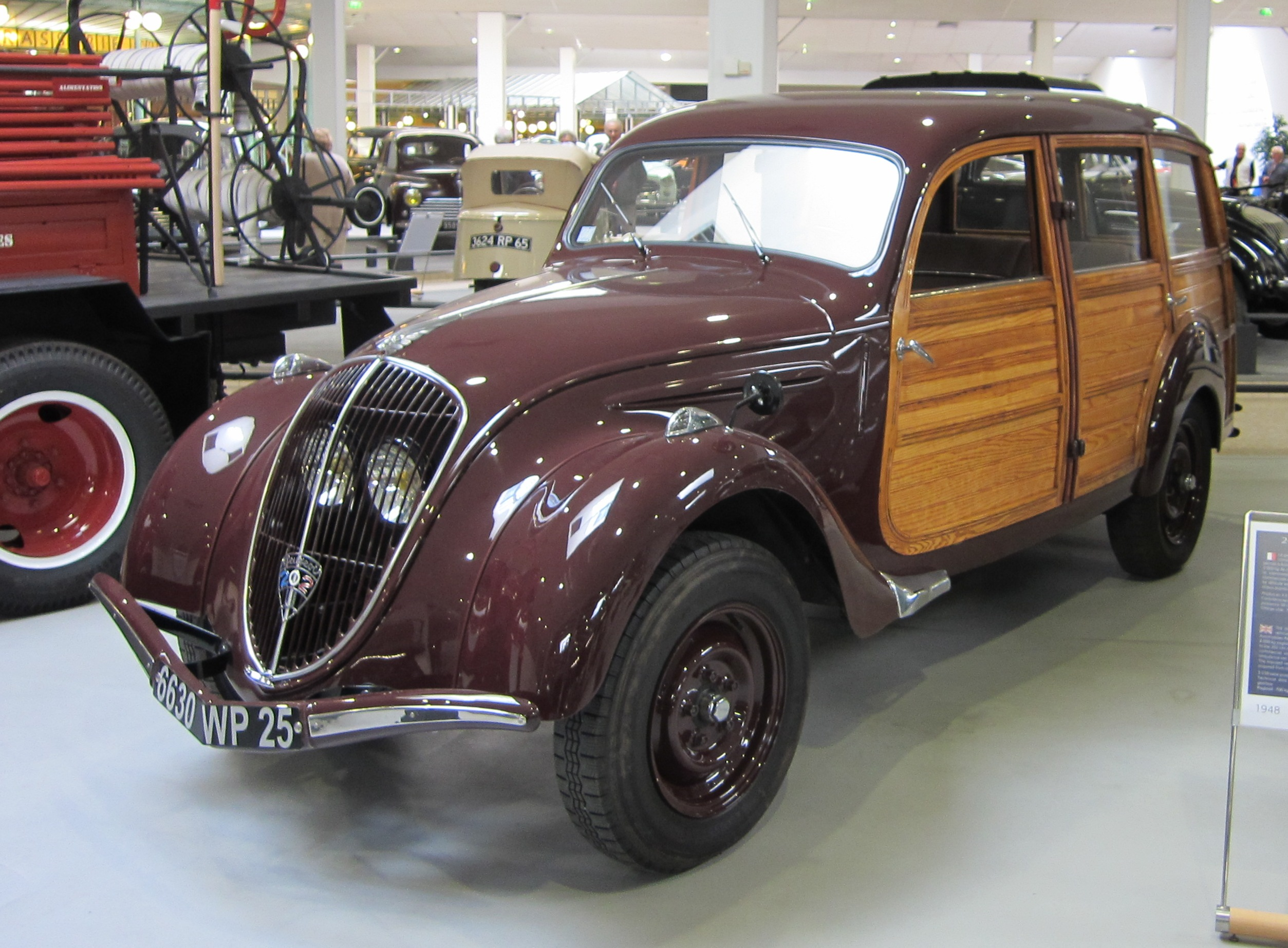
Costing more than 50% above the price of the saloon, the hatch version remained rare, with just over 3,000 produced.
