= Peugeot 402 =

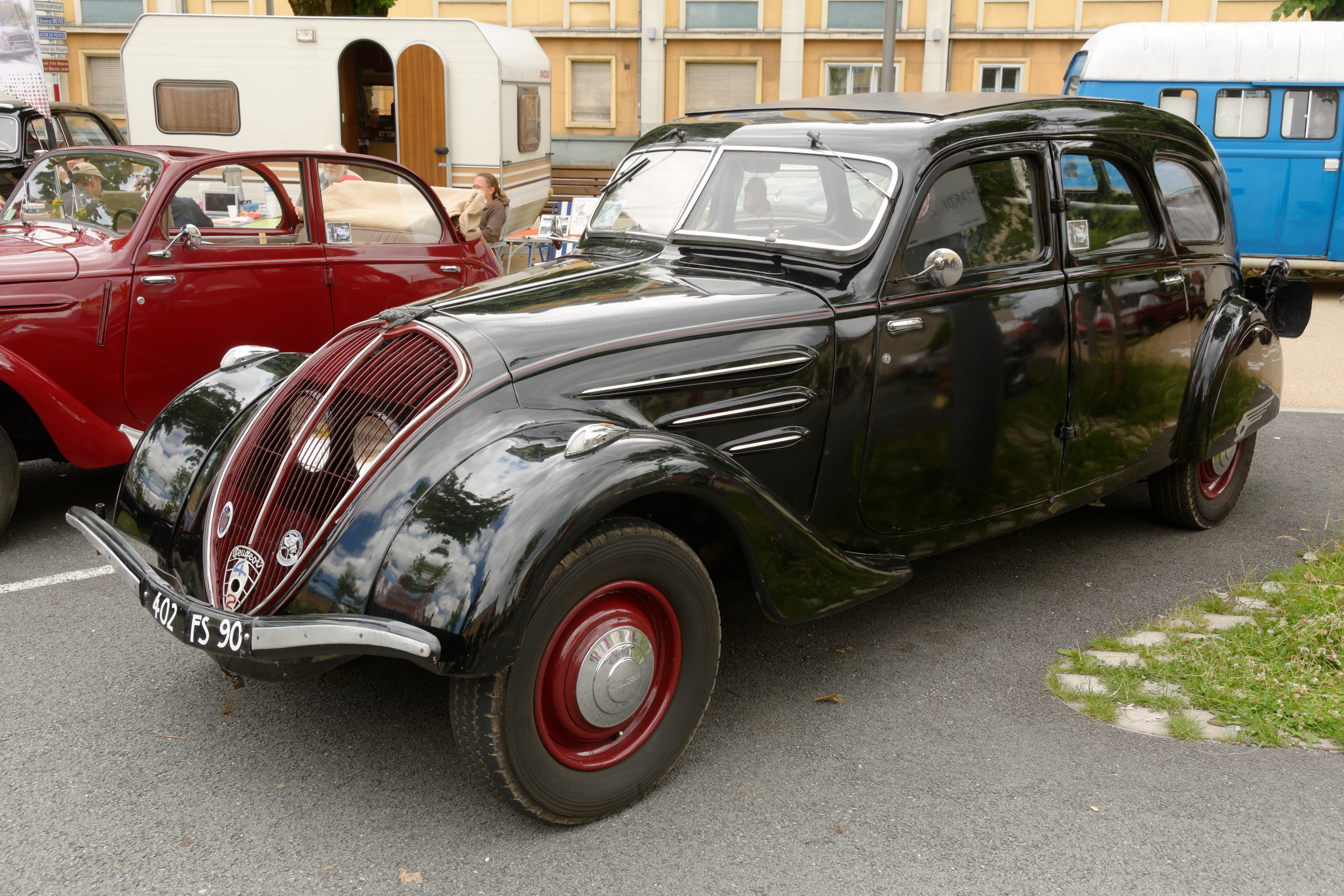
- Peugeot 402

Overview
- Manufacturer: Peugeot SA
- Also called: Peugeot 402B (name modification after October 1938)
- Production: 1935–1942; Approx 75,000 produced
- Assembly: France: Sochaux (Sochaux Plant)

Body and chassis
- Class: Large family car
- Body style: 4-door sedan Long-wheelbase ‘familiale’ sedan various cabriolets and coupés van and utility versions
- Layout: FR layout

Powertrain
- Engine: 1991 cc straight-4 1935–Oct 1938; 2142 cc straight-4 Oct 1938–1942

Dimensions
- Wheelbase: 2,880 mm (113 in) légère (light); 3,150 mm (124 in) 3,330 mm (131 in) longue / familiale
- Length: 4,850 mm (190.9 in) standard steel bodied saloon 4,500 mm (177.2 in) - 5,000 mm (196.9 in) (approx)
- Width: 1,640 mm (64.6 in)
- Height: 1,580 mm (62.2 in)
- Curb weight: 1,110–1,315 kg (2,447–2,899 lb)

Chronology
- Predecessor: Peugeot 401
- Successor: Peugeot 403

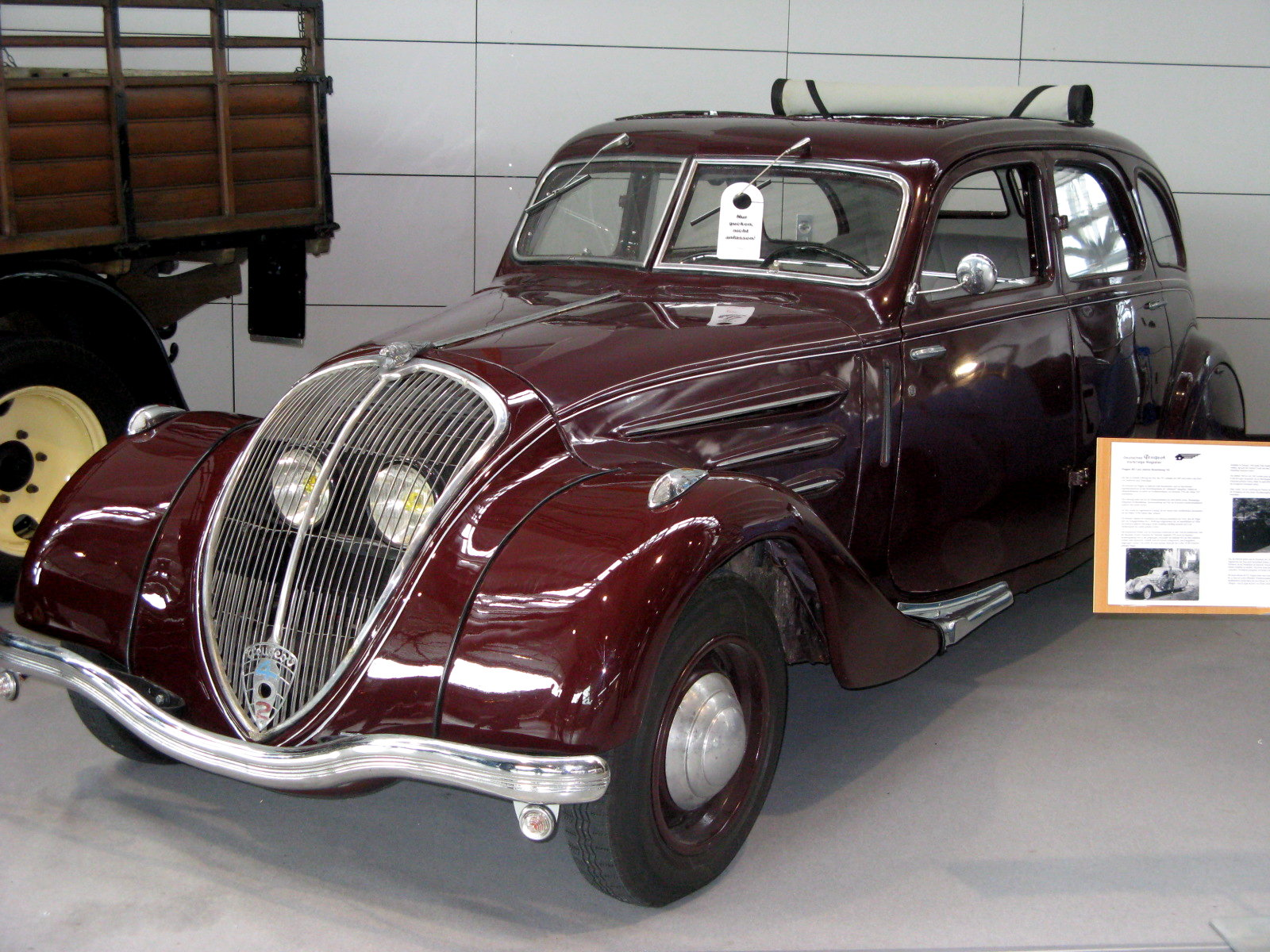
The 402 "longue" became popular with the military after Peugeot began to supply them to the French army in 1938.

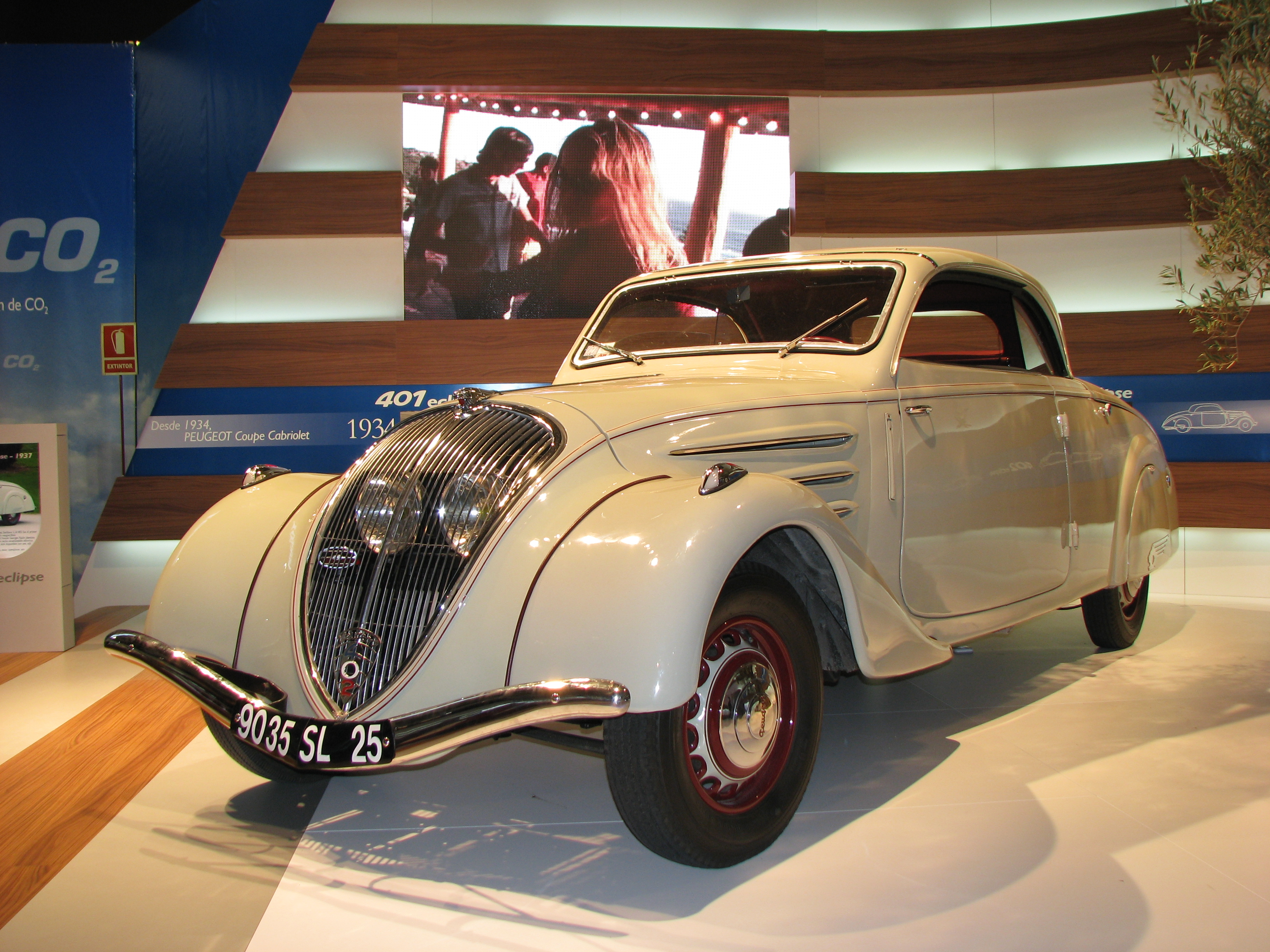
Peugeot 402 Eclipse.

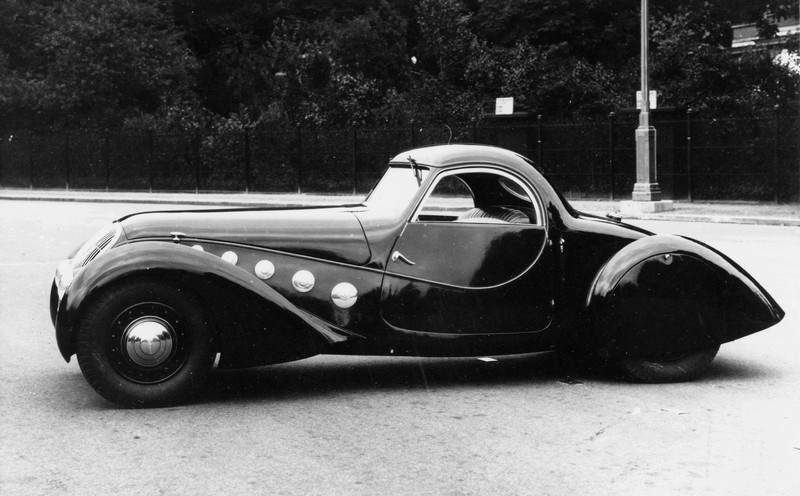
Various low-volume coupé versions included the Peugeot 402 Darl'mat, unmistakably reminiscent of a body produced by the same coachbuilder (Carrosserie Pourtout) for Bugatti.

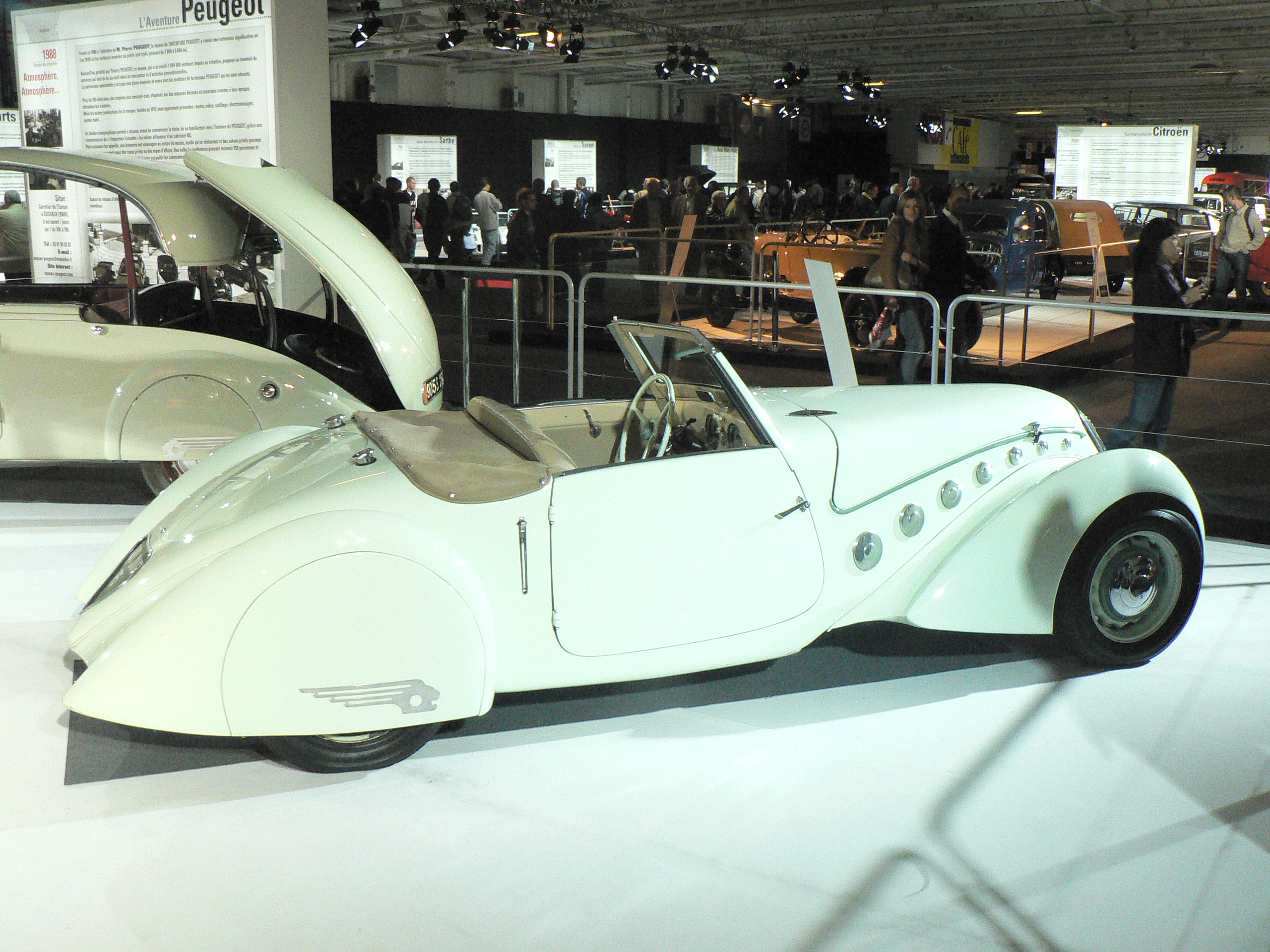
A 402 cabriolet on display at the 2006 Paris Auto Show (Mondial de l'Automobile). Behind this one is a Georges Paulin patented automatic folding roof in action.

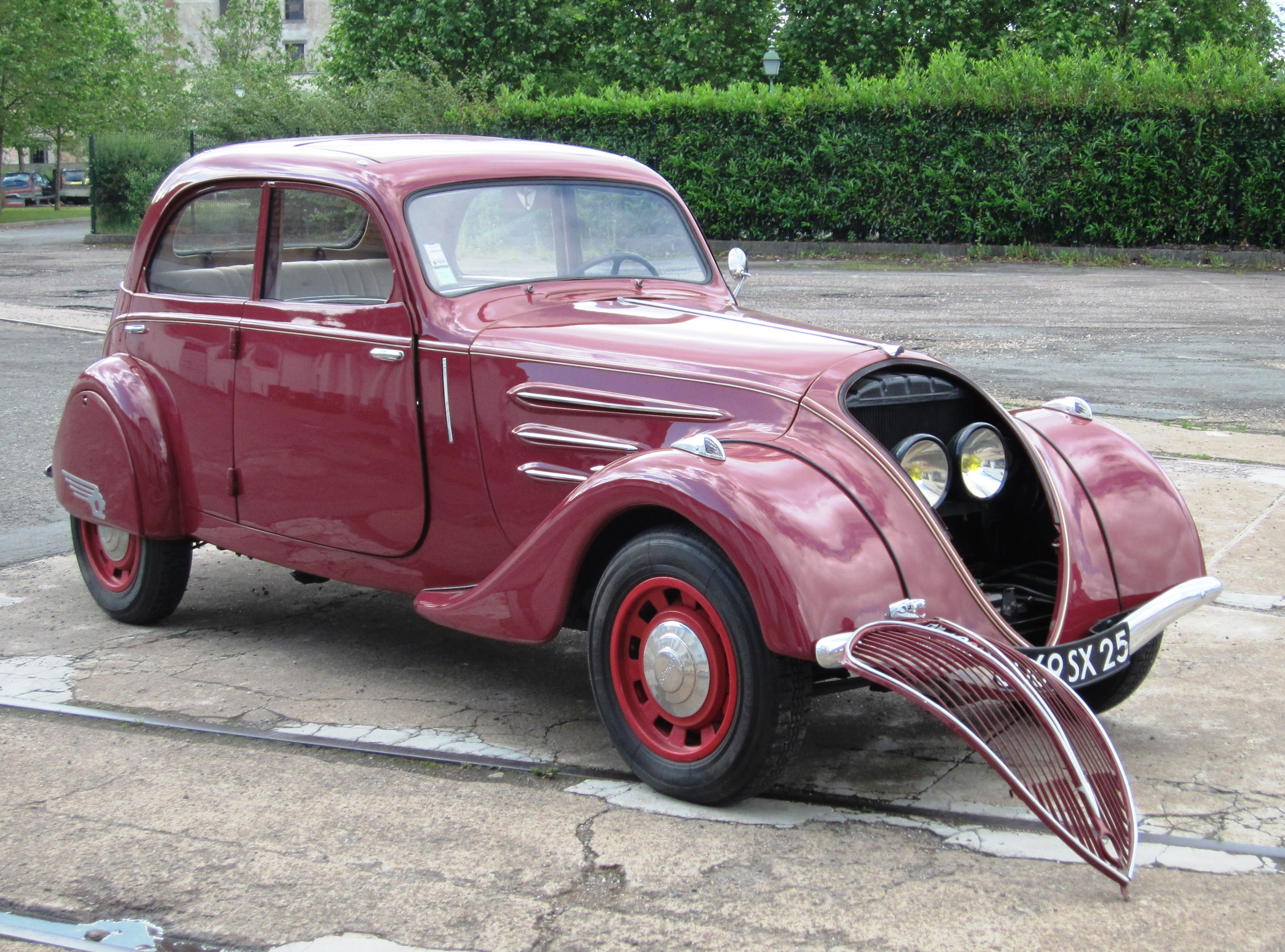
Peugeot 402 B2 Légère Sport (1939). This low volume special model was in most respects a Peugeot 202, but it had a lengthened nose which accommodated the larger engine of the 402. And it was branded not as a 202 but as a special variation of Peugeot 402.

The Peugeot 402 is a large family car produced by Peugeot in Sochaux, France, from 1935 to 1942. It was unveiled at the Paris Motor Show in 1935, replacing the Peugeot 401.

The Peugeot 402 stands out in automotive design by its very streamlined, but also still somewhat Art Deco styling, strongly influenced by that of the 1934 Chrysler Airflow; especially the low-volume 402 Darl'mat coupé is viewed as distinctly Art Deco. Peugeot's 402 took it two steps further, however: the grille has an even more pronounced rake, but most importantly, Peugeot brought the headlights to the center, behind the grille, and in front of the radiator, sixteen years before the 1951 General Motors Le Sabre concept car. Contrary to Chrysler's Airflow, the Peugeot 402 wasn't a sales flop.

Furthermore, the 402 Éclipse décapotable, made in collaboration with Pourtout coachbuilders, was one of the world's first convertible hard-top production cars.

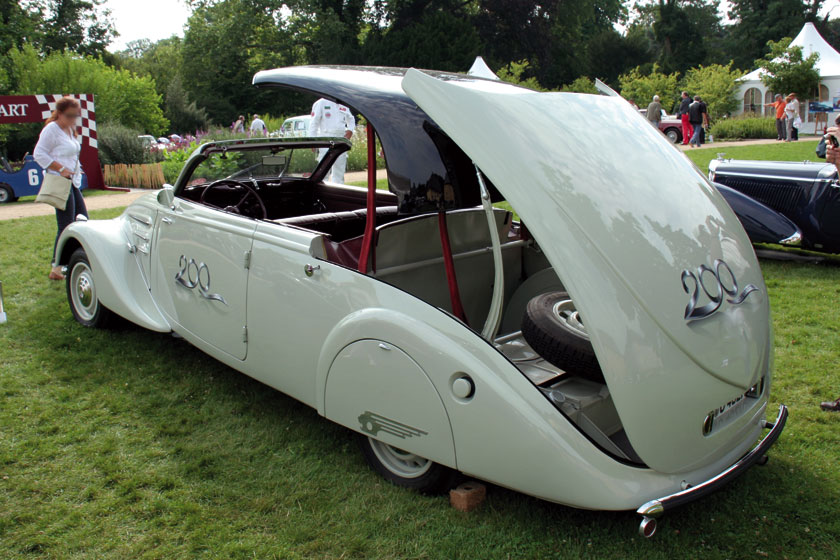
Peugeot 402 Eclipse décapotable (1938)

Despite being introduced some thirteen years after the demise of the 402 during World War II, the Peugeot 403 was clearly intended as the 402's successor, given that after the war, the market first needed cheaper and smaller, more frugal cars. Peugeot saw this and thus focused on their 202 and 203 models during the late 1940s and early 1950s.

== A conservative innovator ==
The 402 was characterized by what became during the 1930s a "typically Peugeot" front end, with headlights well set back behind the grille. The style of the body was directly modelled on the Chrysler Airflow, which was seen as revolutionary at the time. Peugeot bought one or two Airflows to disassemble and study. Thus, the 402 received the soubriquet: 'Fuseau Sochaux' in France – this loosely translates to the "spindle or axis of Peugeot's main plant in Sochaux". Streamlining was a feature of French car design in the 1930s, as can be seen by comparing the Citroën Traction Avant or some of the Bugattis of the period, such as the Type 57, with predecessor models such as the Citroën Rosalie. Peugeot was among the first volume manufacturers to apply streamlining to the extent exemplified by the 402 and smaller Peugeot 202 in a volume market vehicle range.

Recessed ‘safety’ door handles also highlighted the car's innovative aspirations, as did the advertised automatic transmission and diesel engine options. Comparisons with Citroën's large family car of the time, the Traction Avant were and remain unavoidable. In that comparison, the basic underpinnings of the 402 remained conventional, based on known technologies, and presumably were relatively inexpensive to develop and manufacture: it was Citroën that in 1934 had been forced to sell its car manufacturing business to its largest creditor, Michelin. Sticking to a traditional separate chassis configuration also made it much easier for Peugeot's 402 to be offered with a wide range of different bodies.

Peugeot invested significantly in developing the car and in tooling up to produce it. The 402 was a popular seller by the standards of the time. It was also a large car and at the high end of the car market, and in advertising material of the time Peugeot evidently thought it important to highlight one or two tempting standard features, such as the twin windscreen wipers powered by their own electric motor, the semaphore-style trafficators, the clock included on the instrument panel, the twin sun visors and the switchable reserve section of the fuel tank.

== The range ==
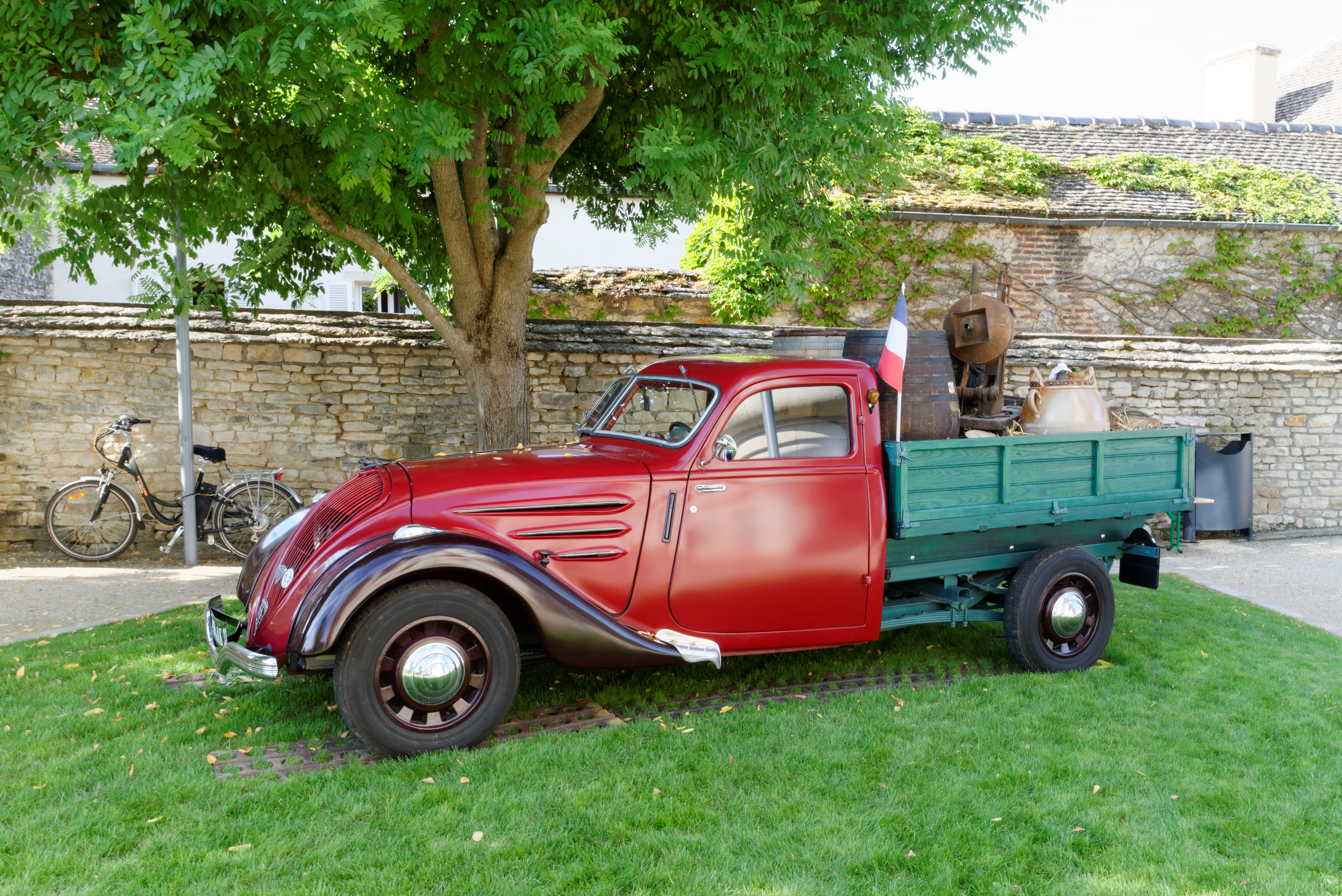
Some sedans were converted into pickup truck and van versions, during and after the war.

Even by 1930s standards, the range of different 402 models based on the single chassis was large, comprising at one stage, by one estimate, sixteen different body types, from expensive steel bodied convertible cars, to family saloons which were among the most spacious produced in France.

An aspect of the all-steel car bodies that became mainstream among the larger European automakers in the 1930s was the very high initial cost associated with the heavy steel presses and the dies needed to cut and stamp pressed steel sheeting into the panels that, when welded together, would form a sufficiently rigid and robust car body. The wide range of car bodies was therefore carefully devised to maximise the sharing of panels between the different body variants listed.

=== Three chassis lengths ===
There were three different standard wheelbases of 2,880 mm (113 in) (short), 3,150 mm (124 in) (“normal”) and 3,300 mm (130 in) (long).

==== 2,880 mm (113 in) “short” wheelbase (1937-1940) ====
When the 402 was launched in 1935 there were just two chassis lengths, but for 1937 the manufacturer added a third “short” chassis, inherited from the short-lived Peugeot 302. The short chassis was used from 1937 for the Peugeot 402 Légère (“light-bodied”).

The Peugeot 402 Légère was first exhibited in July 1937 and was featured on the Peugeot stand in place of the Peugeot 302 at that year's October Motor Show. The car combined the 2,880 mm (113 in) wheelbase and body from the Peugeot 302 with the larger 1991 cc engine of the Peugeot 402. Whereas the 302 had produced a maximum output of 43 hp (32 kW) at 4,000 rpm, maximum power for the 402 Légère was listed as 55 hp (41 kW) still at 4,000 rpm. That translated into a difference in listed top speed between 105 km/h (65 mph) and 125 km/h (78 mph). The simple formula of combining one existing bodyshell with another engine that was also already in production enabled the manufacturer to produce an attractively brisk car with minimum investment. Approximately 11,000 were produced.

From the outside the 402 Légère was initially virtually indistinguishable from the 302. However, on the front grille, whereas on the 302 the hole for the starting handle corresponded with the central digit in the car's name spelled out on bottom part of the front grille, on the 402 Légère it was necessary to position the hole for the starting handle below the “402” name badge because the engine itself was positioned very slightly higher. An improvement over the 302 available to the driver, albeit only at extra cost, was the option of a Cotal pre-selector transmission, which could be controlled using a selector lever positioned directly behind the steering wheel, so that the driver needed to move his/her hand only minimally in order to change gear.

Although sources tend to refer to the 402 Légère as a single model, there was nevertheless a choice of at least three bodies.

Priced at 24,900 Francs in October 1937 was the four door “402 Légère berline” (saloon/sedan) using the body already familiar from the 302. Not yet ready for presentation at the 1937 show, but nevertheless already priced (at 30,900 Francs) and advertised was the 402 Légère “coach”, which was a stylish thinner looking 2-door four seater car shaped somewhere between a sedan/saloon and coupe, with “glass on glass” side windows (allowing for the possibility, with the windows open, of a “pillarless” side profile) and front seats that tilted to permit access to the adequately spacious rear of the passenger cabin. Represented at the motor show by a prototype which differed in certain details from the cars that actually appeared a few months later was the 402 Légère “décapotable” (soft-top convertible), priced at 31,900 Francs. Both the “coach” and the “décapotable” bodied cars featured a slightly more streamlined look than the “berline”, and their stylishness was enhanced by “spats” covering the upper portions of the rear wheels.

==== 3,150 mm (124 in) “normal” wheelbase (1935-1942) ====
The standard bodied saloon/sedan (berline), first presented at the Paris Motor Show in the late Autumn of 1935 sat on the “normal” 3,150 mm (124 in) chassis and was advertised as a six-seater, the passengers being accommodated in two rows on bench seats in what was, by the standards of the time and place, an unusually wide car. The four-door "berline" came as a "6 glaces" (six-light, ie three windows on each side) saloon/sedan. In 1936 the price list showed the saloon as the least expensive of the normal wheelbase 402s, priced from 23,900 francs.

Closely resembling the 402 berline "6 glaces", at first sight, was the 402 "normale commerciale" also offering seating for six people accommodated in two rows. However, at the back, in place of the more usual panels, the “commerciale” featured a two-piece tailgate. The rear of the cabin was described as being “transformable pour transport de marchandises” (transformable for transport of goods) which presumably would have involved lifting out the rear seat. Later on there were also 402 commerciales exhibited with semi-squared off rear roof lines along the lines of a steel bodied station wagon/estate car conversion, but most of the 402 commerciales shared, from the side, the silhouette of the 402 saloon/sedan, presumably in order to avoid the cost of tooling up for volume-style production of a relatively small number of uniquely shaped body panels.

Other models appearing on the “normal” wheelbase at the 1936 show included a Grand-luxe berline with a sliding steel sun roof, a 4/5 seater 2-door soft-top cabriolet priced in October 1936 at 30,900 francs, a 5/6-seater "coach" (elegant two-door saloon) priced at 29,900 francs, a 2/3-seater roadster at 27,900 francs and a "coupé transformable Éclipse", which was a steel-roofed convertible, priced at 34,900 francs.

The Éclipse was significant as the first of many Peugeot coupés with a steel roof that would fold and stow in the boot/trunk. The retractable hardtop mechanism had been designed, and in 1931 patented, by Georges Paulin. The mechanism was initially bulky by modern standards, and necessitated a very long tail end. Despite the generous length of the 3,150 mm (124 in) wheelbase, this first application of the technology came with just two seats. Interest in the Éclipse resurfaced more than half a century later with the reinvention of the retractable hardtop by the 1995 Mitsubishi 3000GT Spyder and subsequent popularization of the concept by cars such as the 1996 Mercedes-Benz SLK-Class. Peugeot resumed production of hardtop convertibles with the 2001 Peugeot 206 CC (Coupé Cabriolet).

Several of the body types were priced (and presumably costed) to be produced in relatively low volumes, and despite appearing at the Motor Show in October 1936, three had been delisted by the start of 1937. The delisted variants were the 5/6-seater "coach", the 4/5-seat, 2-door soft-top cabriolet, and the steel-roofed "Coupé transformable Éclipse", although the third of these had already been effectively replaced in 1936 by a similar but even longer steel-roofed convertible Éclipse – now with seating for 4/5 people and using the longest of the 402's three chassis.

==== 3,300 mm (130 in) “long” wheelbase (1935-?1940) ====
The principal “long” Peugeot 402 in 1935 was the “402 Familiale”, closely resembling the “normal” length six light “berline, but with extra length used in the rear of the cabin to accommodate a third row of seats (“strapontins escamotables”) which could be folded away when not in use.

By the time of the 1937 Motor show, in time for the 1938 model year, the 402 commerciale had also migrated from the “normal” to the “long wheelbase”.

In addition, the manufacturer advertised a special taxi version of the long wheel base car, closely resembling the Familiale and of which, it was boasted in 1937, several thousand were already in service “in Paris and the [other] principal towns and cities in France or the colonies”. Peugeot were slightly unusual among principal auto-makers at this time in never having acquired a Paris taxi business themselves, but the 402 taxi had nevertheless evidently been well received by independent taxi operators.

Much attention at the 1936 show also focused on the “402 cabriolet metallique decouvrable” which was a reincarnation of the Éclipse, but now using the 3,300 mm (130 in) “long” wheel base which made enough space for a (rather cramped) second bench seat.

Light commercial van and utility variants of the 402 were also produced (or derived from conversion), and during the car's final years, during World War II, assumed increasing prominence within the range. Sources vary as to whether production was ended it 1942 or continued further, possibly till 1944.

== The engines ==
=== Petrol/gasoline ===
The car was launched with a four-cylinder water-cooled engine of 1991 cc with poppet valves. With its claimed 55 hp (41 kW) the standard bodied car could achieve a top speed of 120 km/h (75 mph) at 4,000 rpm. In 1938 the capacity was raised to 2142 cc with the introduction of the Peugeot 402B, stated output now being 60 horsepower (45 kilowatts). Given the wide range of body lengths and styles offered, there was and is correspondingly wide range of different performance figures quoted for the standard-engined 402.

Other engine versions existed, with a claimed output of 70 bhp (52 kW) for a Darl'mat bodied performance coupe version.

=== Diesel ===
Peugeot had been making diesel engines in the north, at their Lille engine plant, since 1928, for use in boats, railcars and agricultural tractors. By 1936 the manufacturer had readied their HL50 series diesel engine for installation in light commercial vehicles. French regulations at the time did not permit the fitting of diesel engines in road vehicles except for trucks and commercial vehicles, and even for their relatively cautious approach to diesel power the 402 it was necessary for Peugeot to obtain a special dispensation from the authorities. By the final weeks of 1938 several prototype 402s had been fitted with the HL50 diesel unit already being used for light trucks. During the early months of 1939 several dozen long bodied 402 "conduite interieure" saloons were fitted with diesel engines and sold into the taxi trade. The HL50 engine used was a 2,300 cc unit with a claimed power output of 55 hp. Had the diesel powered version entered production the 402 would have been one of the first diesel saloons available commercially.

Fuel economy quoted for the 2.3 litre diesel unit was approximately 33% better than that for the 2.1 litre petrol powered 402. By the time war broke out, approximately 12, and possibly several dozen, diesel powered Peugeot 402s were in existence, but only one diesel powered 402 chassis still survived by the time the war came to an end.

The development work was not wasted, however, and in 1959 Peugeot would launch the 403, one of the world's earlier diesel powered saloons, albeit beaten to the market by Mercedes-Benz.

== Running gear ==
Standard transmission was a three-speed manual system, driving through the rear wheels.

The option of a Cotal three-speed automatic was offered, but this was an elaborate system more commonly seen on upmarket models from the likes of Delahaye and Delage. Priced in 1937 as a 2,500 Franc option (up from an already hefty 1,800 Francs in 1936), it was too expensive to appeal to most 402 buyers.

Stopping the car was achieved using mechanical (cable operated) drum brakes: with the Citroën Traction already featuring hydraulic brakes, cable-operated brakes were beginning to be regarded as an old technology which compromised the innovative image presented by other aspects of the 402.

== Commercial ==
Approximately 75,000 402s were produced during the seven or more years of production. It took Peugeot from the 1930s to the 1940s, covering two decades that saw a dramatic reduction in the number of automakers in France. Of the survivors, Citroën was taken over by the tyre/tire company Michelin in 1934 and Renault was nationalised in 1945. Peugeot survived and retained its independence.

France declared war on Germany in 1939 and after this date cabriolet and convertible versions of the 402 disappeared from the price lists. The April 1940 price list shows only the standard bodied and long wheelbase saloons. Peugeot only became a regular supplier to the army in 1938, but during 1939 and 1940 several thousand 202s and 402s were operating with the armed services, the long wheel base 402 being a particular military favourite.

== The Peugeot 402 in a world without petrol ==
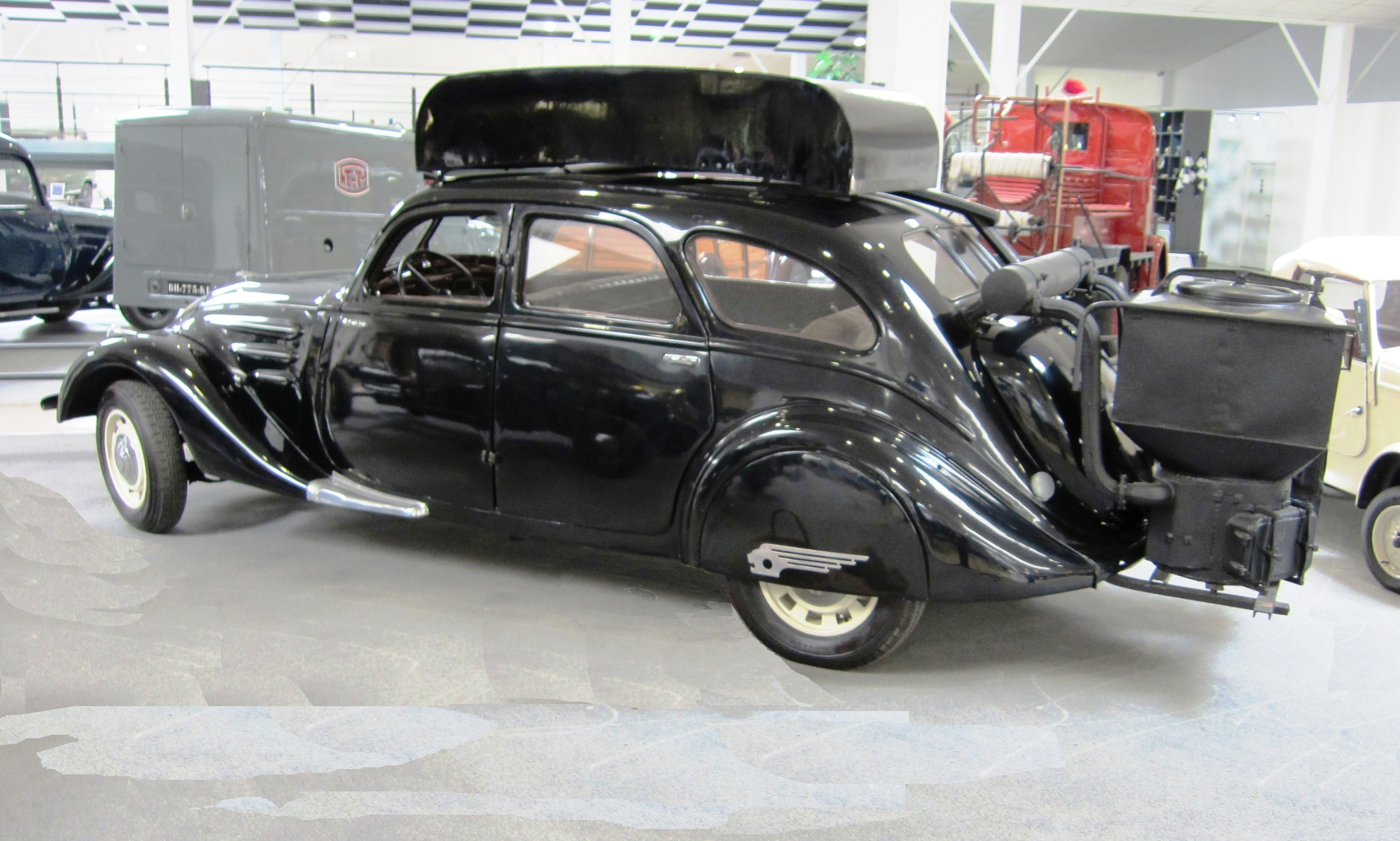
During the war motor fuel for civilian use disappeared, and more than 2,500 Peugeots were adapted to run on gas generated through the controlled burning of charcoal in a boiler mounted on the vehicle. The 402 Longue was found to be particularly suitable for the conversion.

The speed of the French defeat in June 1940 may have come as a shock, but the advent of another war with Germany and of resulting restrictions on civilian fuel availability had been widely foreseen. In 1939 Peugeot were already investigating the adaptation of petrol/gasoline engines to run on gas created by the controlled burning of charcoal. The technology would prove particularly suitable for the long bodied Peugeot 402 and for the Peugeot DMA light truck. On the car it was possible to fit the necessary components without excessive modification of the bodywork. A charcoal burning boiler, able to accommodate 35 kg of charcoal, was mounted on a stout platform at the back of the car. This provided sufficient power for approximately 80 km (50 miles) before more charcoal needed to be taken on board. The controlled burning of the charcoal produced carbon monoxide, known as gazogène, which was captured and transferred in a stout pipe mounted on the outside of the right-hand C-pillar to a roof mounted gas tank. From here another stout pipe mounted on the outside of the right hand A-pillar drew the gazogène down to the engine. Between 1940 and 1944 more than 2,500 Peugeots were equipped with a gazogène fuel system.

== Peugeot DK 5 ==
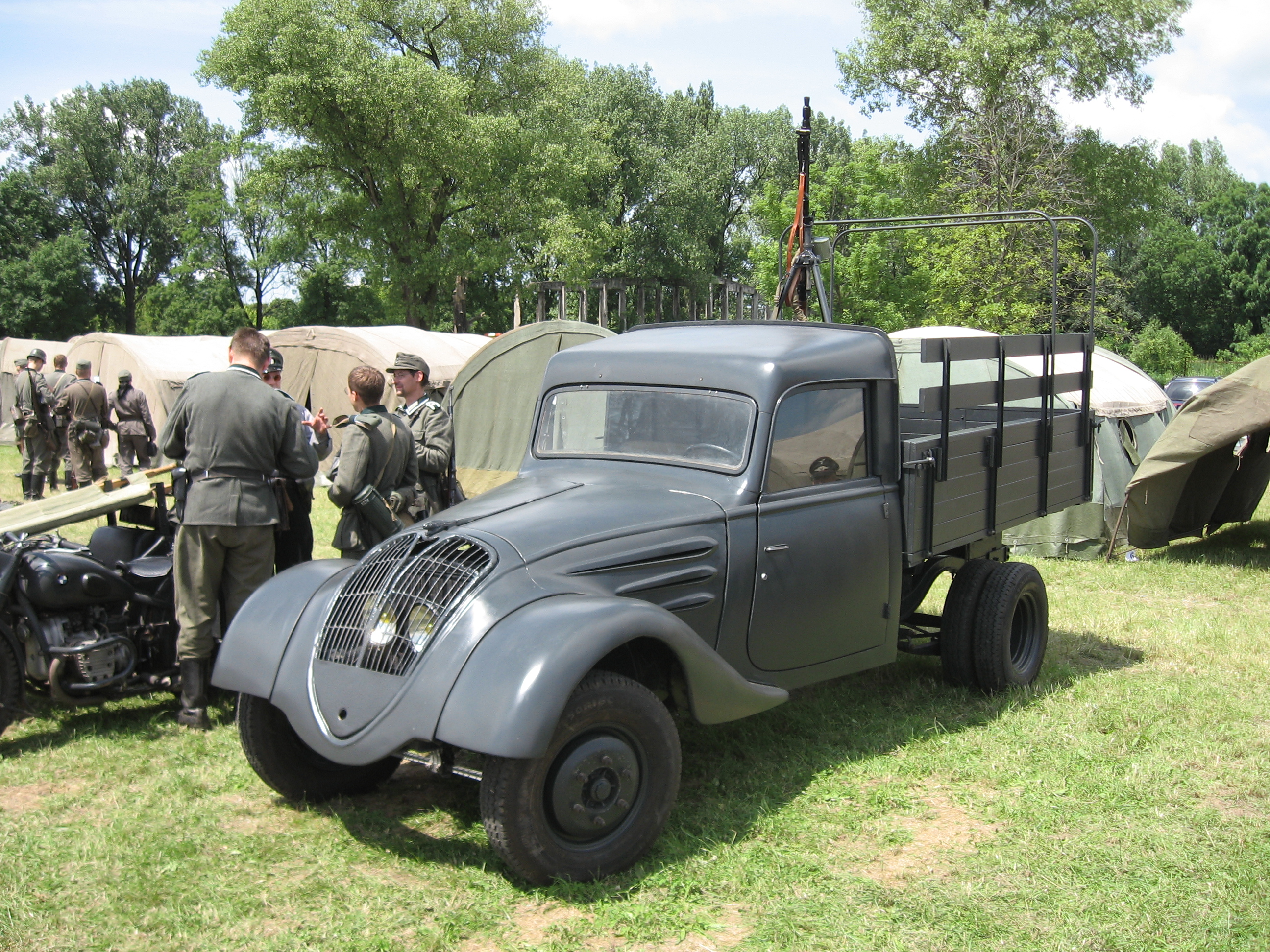
Peugeot DK 5

The Peugeot DK 5 was a military truck produced by Peugeot during the 1930s-1940s for use by the French army. It saw use during the Second World War and was also used by the Wehrmacht when Germany conquered France. The DK 5 was based on a dedicated truck chassis but had the body of the 401 and the front part of the 402 with its back cut off to accommodate a large cargo area. The vehicle curb weight was around 1,790 kg (3,946 lb), had a payload a 1,5 ton payload and received the Peugeot 402's 2142 cc straight-4. 12,500 were manufactured. The last vehicles were retired from service during the 1950s-1960s. The Peugeot DMA was later derived from this design.

== Film appearance ==
The 402 is the Paris taxicab that Don Ameche drove in the screwball comedy Midnight (1939 film).

The 402 is the car Odile Versois drove in the British film A Day to Remember (1953 film).

The car was used by HP Baxxter in his music video 'Friends'

A 402 was recreated by Japanese-based animator/filmmaker Hayao Miyazaki for his 1989 film Majo no takkyubin.
