= Peugeot 302 =

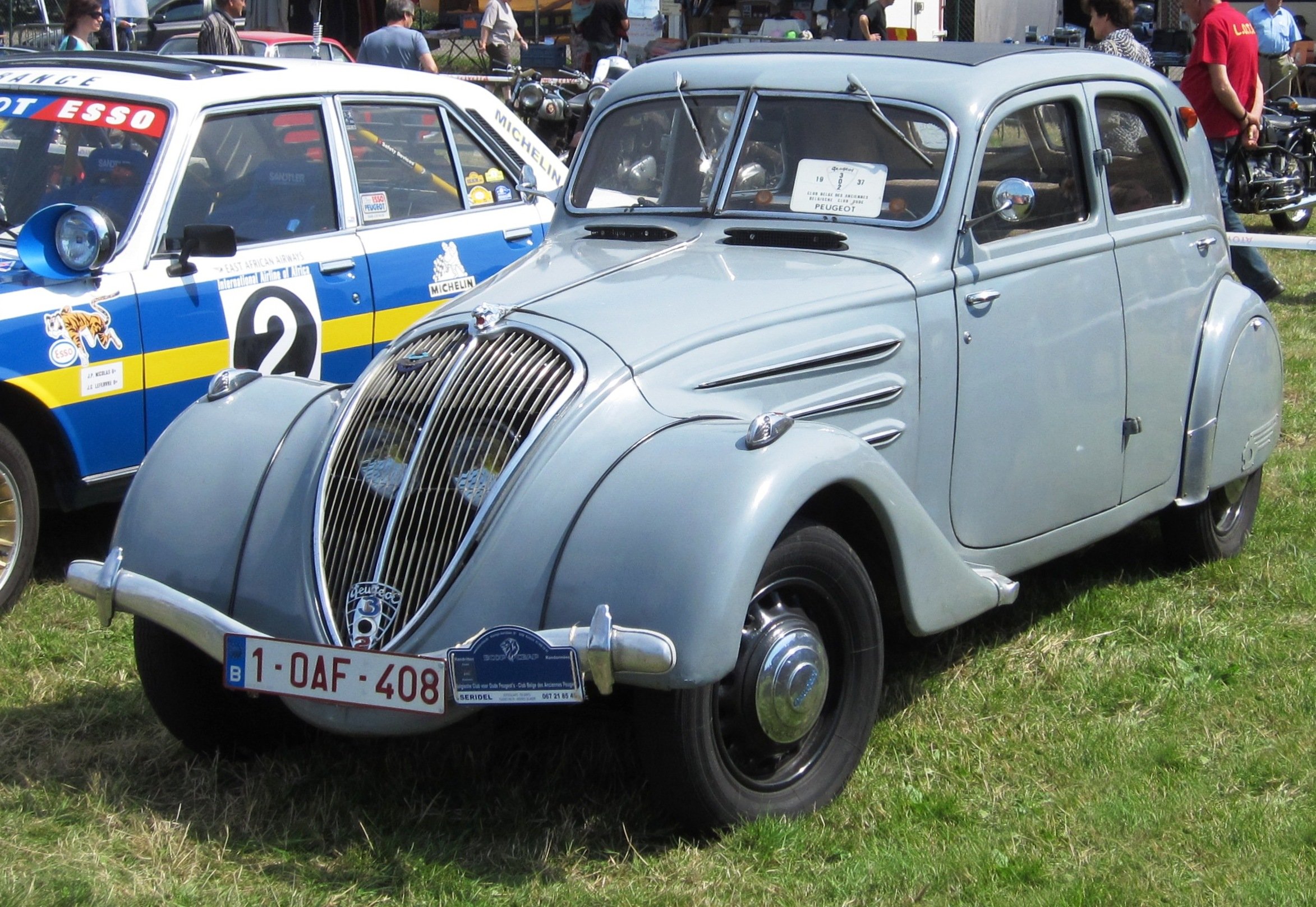
- Peugeot 302

Overview
- Manufacturer: Peugeot SA
- Production: 1936–1937 (available from inventory till mid-1938); 25,083 produced

Body and chassis
- Class: Small family car
- Body style: 4-door sedan various cabriolets and coupés
- Layout: FR layout
- Related: Peugeot 402

Powertrain
- Engine: 1758 cc straight-4

Dimensions
- Wheelbase: 2,880 mm (113.4 in)
- Length: 4,500 mm (177.2 in) standard steel bodied saloon
- Width: 1,570 mm (61.8 in)

Chronology
- Predecessor: Peugeot 301
- Successor: Peugeot 402 légère (light)

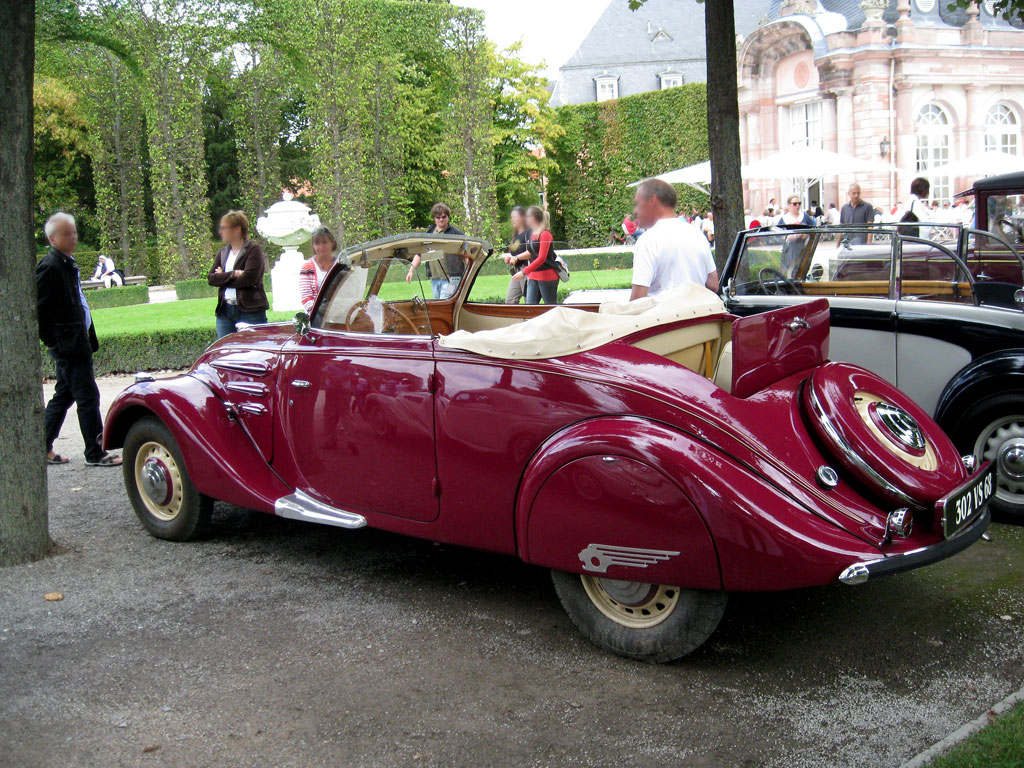
Peugeot 302 cabriolet

The Peugeot 302 is a mid-weight saloon introduced at the 1936 Paris Motor Show by Peugeot and listed, for just 18 months, until April 1938.

== Background ==
The 302 was effectively a shortened version of the Peugeot 402 with a smaller engine. It was launched a year after the 402.

=== Positioning the 302 ===
The aerodynamic 402 was enthusiastically received by the market, but it was half a class larger than the Citroën Traction Avant which had in many ways rewritten the rule book when launched in 1934, and which during the later 1930s acquired a range of different engine sizes and wheelbase lengths. The 302 could compete more directly with the Citroën as a modest return to stability after the economic crisis of 1929 hinted at future growth in market demand for mid-sized saloons. Nevertheless, by the time the car was actually launched the country was in a state of industrial turmoil and heightened political uncertainty.

=== A short life ===
Peugeot had ended production of their popular 201 model in September 1937, and its replacement, the smaller Peugeot 202 would appear only in February 1938. At the time of Motor Show in October 1937 the Peugeot 302 was still listed, partly in order to help clear remaining stocks after what had been a precarious year for French industry, both economically and politically, but the car itself was absent from the Peugeot show-stand. Through the autumn and winter of 1937/38 the 302 was the smallest and least expensive car on offer at Peugeot dealers.

== The body ==
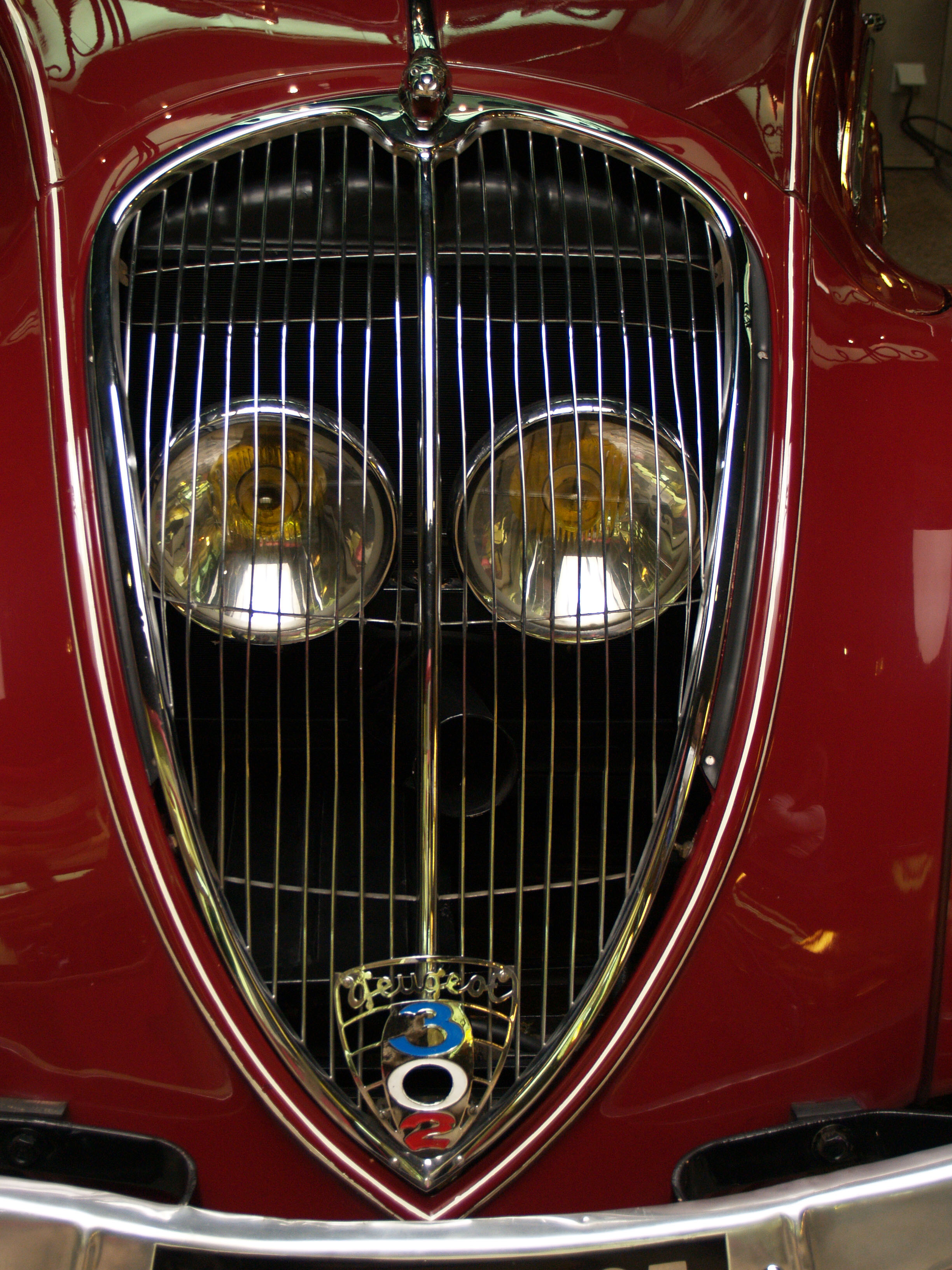
Peugeot 302 front grille with hole for starter handle passing through the 302

The 302 faithfully followed the style of the longer 402, complete with a sloping front grille behind which lurked the head lights. A notable detail was the hole for the starter handle on lower part of the front grille, which passed through the middle digit of the vertically inscribed name "302", coloured in patriotic blue, white and red.

In addition to the saloon and the manufacturer's own two-door four-seater cabriolet, a small number of special bodied versions were produced including a Darl'mat built 302 roadster and a coupé-cabriolet incorporating the automatic fold-away steel roof design patented by Georges Paulin as early as 1931.

== Engine and running gear ==
The four cylinder water cooled 1758 cc engine was in most respects similar to the slightly larger engine fitted to the 402. Tax horsepower was 10 CV, rather than the 11 CV of the 402. Maximum actual output of 43 PS (32 kW) was claimed, along with a maximum speed of 105 km/h (65 mph).

Power was delivered from the front-mounted engine to the rear wheels via a traditional three-speed gear box.

A couple of years earlier, Peugeot had scored a first among the volume automakers when they introduced an upgraded 201 featuring independent front suspension, and with competitors such as Renault reluctant to invest in keeping up on the technical front, and subsequent Peugeot models such as the 302 featuring independent front suspension, Peugeot were able to win plaudits for a technical advance which provided for superior road holding and comfort, especially when the car was driven briskly on poor roads. At the back the 302 used a rigid axle suspended using cantilever-spring combinations.
