= Peugeot Type 190 =

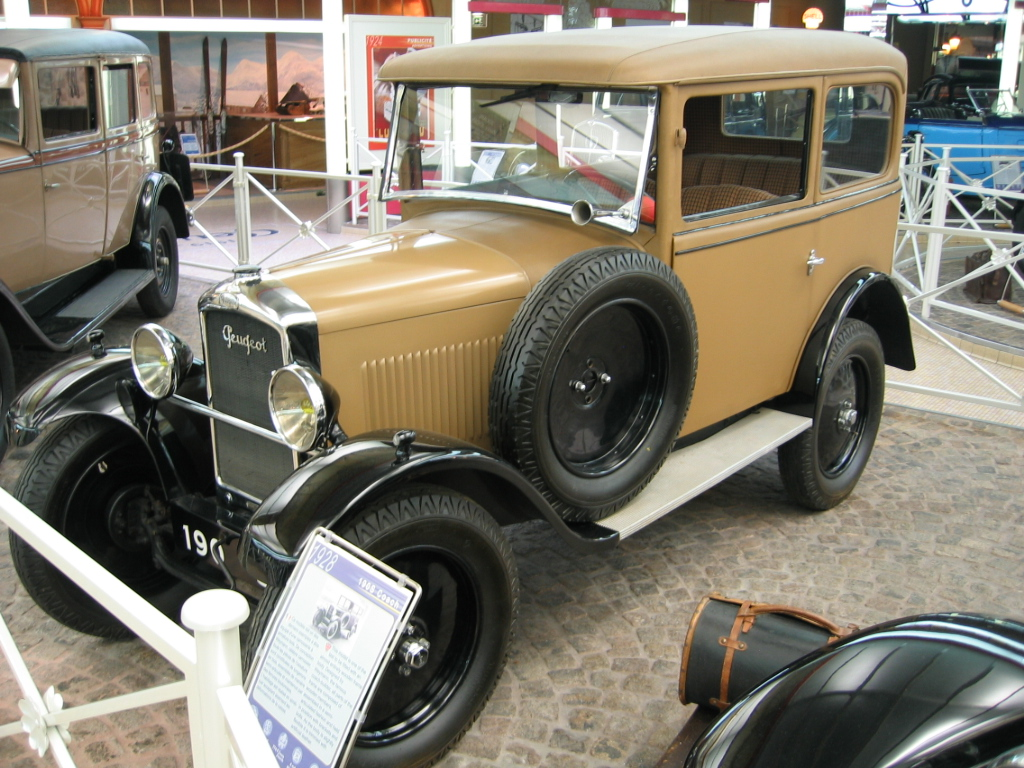

Overview
- Manufacturer: Peugeot SA
- Production: 1928–1931; 33,677 produced

Body and chassis
- Body style: Torpedo; Spider
- Layout: FR layout

Powertrain
- Engine: 695 cc I4

Chronology
- Predecessor: Peugeot 5CV
- Successor: Peugeot 201

The Peugeot Type 190 S is a model of Peugeot produced between 1928 and 1931.

The Type 190 was launched in late 1928 and sold alongside the lightweight Peugeot 5CV (itself based on the Quadrilette), a best-seller of the 1920s, which it was intended to replace. The Type 190 was also a small vehicle, but more traditional compared to earlier models. Its body was available in torpedo and spider configurations. The Type 190 carried over the small four-cylinder 695 cc engine from the 5CV, which developed 14 metric horsepower (10 kW) and could push the car to a maximum speed of 60 kilometres per hour (37 mph). The type 190 was quite successful and a total of more than 33,000 vehicles were produced. In 1929, its intended successor, the Peugeot 201, was launched, though production of the Type 190 ran until 1931.

== Traditional body construction ==
The 190S was one of the last Peugeot models to come with a timber-frame body. Each piece of the frame was individually shaped from ash or beech wood, using traditional carpenters' tools.

== End of traditional nomenclature ==
The Type 190 was so named because it was the 190th distinct design developed by Peugeot. However, at the time few customers would have been aware of the name. Even in the company's own brochures, the car was simply called "La 5CV Peugeot" (The Peugeot 5 hp). That all changed when this model was replaced. Cars after the Type 190 use names three digits long with a zero in the middle, beginning with the 201, abandoning Peugeot's original procedure of naming each new model with a successive ordinal number. Cars of the 20x class would be smaller than cars of the 30x or 40x class, and cars of the same class would be usually replaced by the next ordinal number (e.g. the 201 was replaced with the Peugeot 202).
