= Sochaux =

- Commune
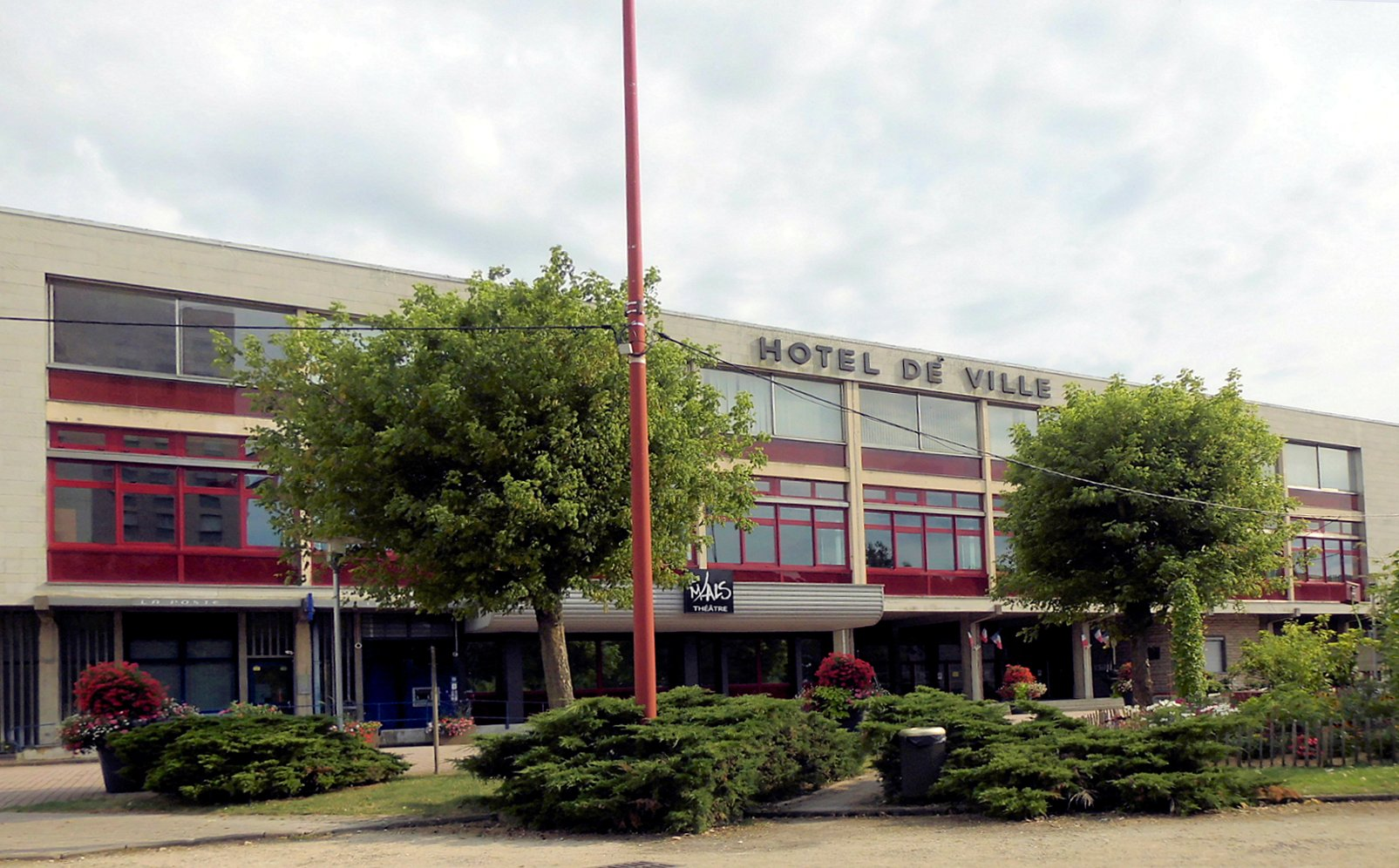
- The town hall in Sochaux

- Coat of arms
- Location of Sochaux
- Location within France Location within Bourgogne-Franche-Comté
- Coordinates: 47°31′N 6°50′E
- Country: France
- Region: Bourgogne-Franche-Comté
- Department: Doubs
- Arrondissement: Montbéliard
- Canton: Bethoncourt
- Intercommunality: Pays de Montbéliard Agglomération

Government
  - Mayor (2020–2026): Albert Matocq-Grabot
- Area^{1}: 2.17 km^{2} (0.84 sq mi)
- Highest elevation: 398 m (1,306 ft)
- Lowest elevation: 317 m (1,040 ft)
- Population (2023): 3,721
  - Density: 1,710/km^{2} (4,440/sq mi)
- Time zone: UTC+01:00 (CET)
  - Summer (DST): UTC+02:00 (CEST)
- INSEE/Postal code: 25547 /25600
- ^{1} French Land Register data, which excludes lakes, ponds, glaciers > 1 km^{2} (0.386 sq mi or 247 acres) and river estuaries.

Sochaux (French pronunciation: [sɔʃo]) is a commune in the Doubs department in the Bourgogne-Franche-Comté region in eastern France.

== Geography ==
Sochaux lies 3 km (1.9 mi) east of Montbéliard, and 484 km (301 mi) southeast of Paris.

== Population ==
Inhabitants are known as Sochaliens.

Historical population
Year	Pop.	±% p.a.
1968	6,116	—
1975	6,344	+0.52%
1982	5,254	−2.66%
1990	4,419	−2.14%
1999	4,491	+0.18%
2007	4,272	−0.62%
2012	4,002	−1.30%
2017	3,949	−0.27%
2023	3,721	−0.99%
Source: INSEE

== Economy ==
Sochaux is the site of a large industrial facility of the French auto manufacturer PSA Peugeot Citroën. As of late 2005, about 16,000 people were employed there. The town also contains the Peugeot automobile museum. Peugeot's badge, the lion rampant, is derived from the town's coat-of-arms.

== Second World War ==
After the fall of France, the Peugeot factory was converted to produce tanks for Germany, and later, parts for the V1 buzz bomb.

"On 15/16 July 1943, the R.A.F. sent 165 Halifax bombers to attack the Peugeot motor factory; five were lost. 750 tons of high explosive were dropped. The outcome of this raid illustrated again the difficulties of hitting relatively small targets in the occupied countries and the danger to surrounding civilians. The night was clear, the target was only lightly defended and the attack altitude was 6,000 to 10,000 ft, but the centre of the group of markers dropped by the Pathfinder crews of 35 Squadron was 700 yards beyond the factory. The factory was classed as 5 per cent damaged; the production was normal immediately after the raid." 125 residents were killed and 260 were seriously injured. Over 100 houses were destroyed, and 400 more were badly damaged. When this news reached London, the R.A.F. prepared to send another raid.

However, a British S.O.E. agent, Harry Ree, telephoned the owner, Rodolphe Peugeot, and explained that sabotage would be far more effective, and would leave the structures undamaged. The owner gave his whole-hearted support. On the night of 3 November, the chief electrician, Pierre Lucas, and the foreman, Andre van der Straaten, and three other workers, having hidden explosives in the factory, went to lay the charges. They were intercepted by some German guards who were kicking a football around, and were challenged to a France vs Germany football match, during which a limpet mine fell from the pocket of a saboteur. A German called out, "You have dropped something", and the saboteur quickly picked it up. But the game went on too long, so the attack was postponed for two nights, and was carried out (appropriately enough) on Guy Fawkes' Night. The factory was out of commission for six months.

== Sport ==
The FC Sochaux-Montbéliard football club is located in the town, and currently plays in Ligue 2. On 13 May 2007, FCSM defeated Olympique de Marseille to win the Coupe de France for the first time since 1937.

== See also ==
- Communes of the Doubs department
