= Hebros 1100 =

Overview
- Production: 1967 (3 units)
- Assembly: Bulgaria: Plovdiv
- Designer: Dimitar Svirachev

Body and chassis
- Chassis: Bulgarrenault 10

The Hebros 1100 was a prototype Bulgarian automobile developed in 1967 at the Plovdiv plant, a year after the assembly of Renault vehicles commenced in Bulgaria. The project was overseen by General Georgi Yamakov, director of the State Economic Association "Metalchim."

== Design ==
The Hebros 1100 featured a hatchback body made of fiberglass, painted in metallic blue. Its design incorporated elements from various European cars:

- Bumpers and dashboard: sourced from the Fiat 124.
- Headlights: taken from the Wartburg 353.
- Taillights and wheels: borrowed from the Peugeot 204 estate.
- Speedometer and seats: from the Renault 10.
- Steering wheel and gear lever: derived from the Renault 16.

The prototype was powered by a transversely mounted engine with a displacement of 1108 cc, designed by the Technical Development Base at "Metalchim" and manufactured by the machine-building plant in Kazanlak. The engine was paired with a five-speed gearbox and differential in a single block, enabling the Hebros 1100 to reach a top speed of 150 km/h (93 mph).

== History ==
=== Debut ===
The Hebros 1100 made its public debut at the 27th Plovdiv International Fair in September 1968. During the exhibition, the car featured a "Jubilee 25" badge on its front right fender, commemorating the upcoming 25th anniversary of September 9, 1944. This led to some references to the vehicle as "Jubilee-25" or "Yu-25."

=== Production ===
Plans were made to commence mass production of the Hebros 1100 in 1969, alongside fiberglass variants of the Bulgarrenault 10. However, these plans were not realized due to a lack of technological experience, equipped facilities, funding and the liquidation of the Bulgarrenault plant.

=== Legacy ===
Despite its limited production, the Hebros 1100 is remembered for its design and modern concept—a three-door hatchback with a transversely mounted engine and front-wheel-drive.
