= Peugeot 305 =

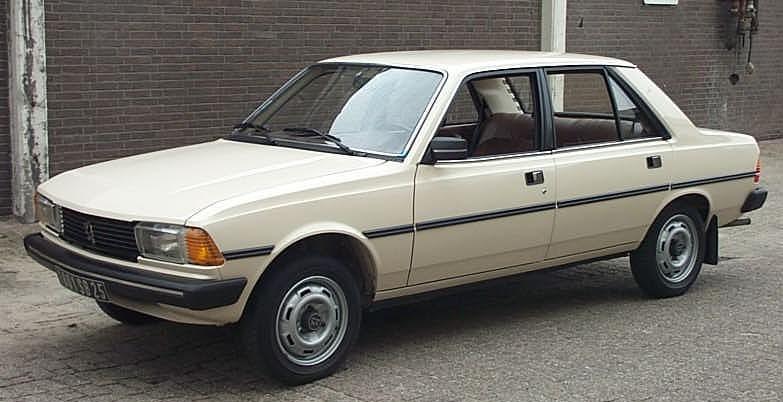
- 1977–1982 Peugeot 305 (pre-facelift)

Overview
- Manufacturer: Peugeot
- Production: 1977–1989 until 1993 in Taiwan
- Assembly: France: Sochaux (Sochaux Plant); Chile: Los Andes (Automotores Franco Chilena S.A.); Morocco: Casablanca (Sopriam); Taiwan: Dacun (Yǔtián)
- Designer: Pininfarina

Body and chassis
- Class: Small family car/Large family car (C/D)
- Body style: 4-door saloon 5-door estate 3-door panel van
- Layout: FF layout

Powertrain
- Engine: petrol: 1,290 cc XL5 I4; 1,472 cc XR5/XR5S I4; 1,580 cc XU5 I4; 1,905 cc XU9 I4; diesel: 1,548 cc XIDL I4; 1,905 cc XUD9 I4
- Transmission: 4-speed automatic ZF 4HP14; 4-speed manual 5-speed manual

Dimensions
- Wheelbase: 2,620 mm (103 in) saloon
- Length: 4,240 mm (167 in) saloon
- Width: 1,635 mm (64.4 in)

Chronology
- Predecessor: Peugeot 304; Peugeot 204
- Successor: Peugeot 405 (Mid-size); Peugeot 309 (Compact)

The Peugeot 305 is a medium-sized car produced by the French automaker Peugeot from 1977 to 1989. It was offered as a four-door saloon, five-door estate, and as a three-door van derivative.

== History ==
=== Origins ===
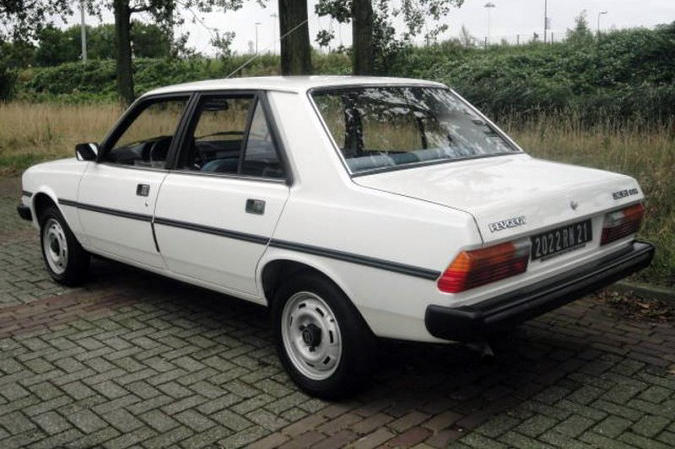
Peugeot 305 GR (pre-facelift)

During the mid 1970s, the motoring press speculated that a new Peugeot would soon arrive, in order to update the company's model lineup, in an attempt to make the Peugeot more internationally appealing. Since Peugeot had only recently discontinued their long-running 404 model, many people thought that the purpose of the new car would to fill the gap, previously occupied by the 404, between the 304 and 504 models, to compete against cars like the Ford Cortina/Taunus and Renault 12. It therefore would have been natural for the new car to be called the 405, commencing a new "05" generation of Peugeot models. However, in fact the car was developed from the running gear from the 304, but in terms of size and price, it was close to the already-defunct 404. The 304 would remain in production some time after the new car was introduced. Instead of being called the 405, the new car was called the 305. When it made its press début in November 1977, the motoring press were initially confused as to why it was called a 305 rather than a 405.

It was similar in size to its French competitor the Renault 18, which was launched around the same time. Sitting somewhere between the C- and D-segments it competed with cars in the Golf-class but also with somewhat larger cars like the Ford Cortina/Taunus, Vauxhall Cavalier/Opel Ascona and Simca 1307/Chrysler Alpine.

=== Production ===
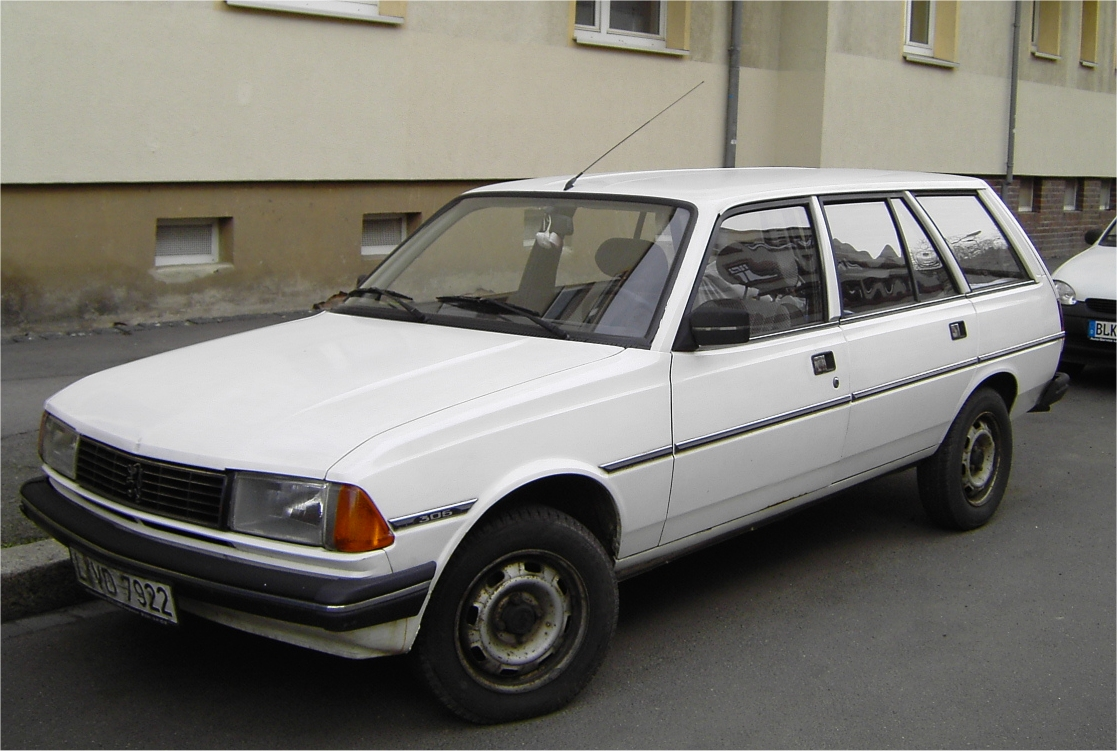
Peugeot 305 Break (facelift)

The Peugeot 305 was unveiled in November 1977, and was initially available as a four-door saloon with a choice of two petrol engines: a 1290 cc, 65 PS (48 kW; 64 hp) unit for the GL and GR models or a 1472 cc, 74 PS (54 kW; 73 hp) for the top-specification SR model. Four months later Peugeot announced the 305 GRD, discreetly identified from the outside by the letters "GRD" on the left side of the boot/trunk lid, and powered by a 1548 cc diesel unit incorporating an aluminium engine block with an overhead camshaft along with a Bosch injector pump, and offering up to 50 PS (37 kW; 49 hp) of power.

In March 1980, the 305 Break (Estate) and Break Service (French market name for the Fourgonnette or Van) were introduced at the Geneva Salon. Going on sale in August, these replaced the earlier 304 Break and Fourgonnette, which were discontinued in May 1980. At Paris 1980, the sportier 305 S with twin carburettors and 89 PS (65 kW; 88 hp) was introduced. After the 1982 facelift, the top model became the GTX, with 105 PS (77 kW). The 305 was the first of the "05" generation of Peugeots, a generation which survived until the end of 605 production in 1999.

The 305 combined a front-wheel-drive car with an excellent and durable gearbox. There was no fifth gear provided but Peugeot was reported to have said that the car had no difficulty reaching 95 mph (153 km/h) if pushed to the limit.

Power came from 1.3-litre or 1.5-litre petrol and 1.55-litre diesel engines and later, after the facelift, the 1.5-litre was replaced by a 1.6-litre and 1.9-litre petrol and diesel engines (XUD) were added. These were the same as used in the Talbot Horizon, a model acquired in 1979 when Peugeot took over Chrysler's European division and rebranded it as Talbot.

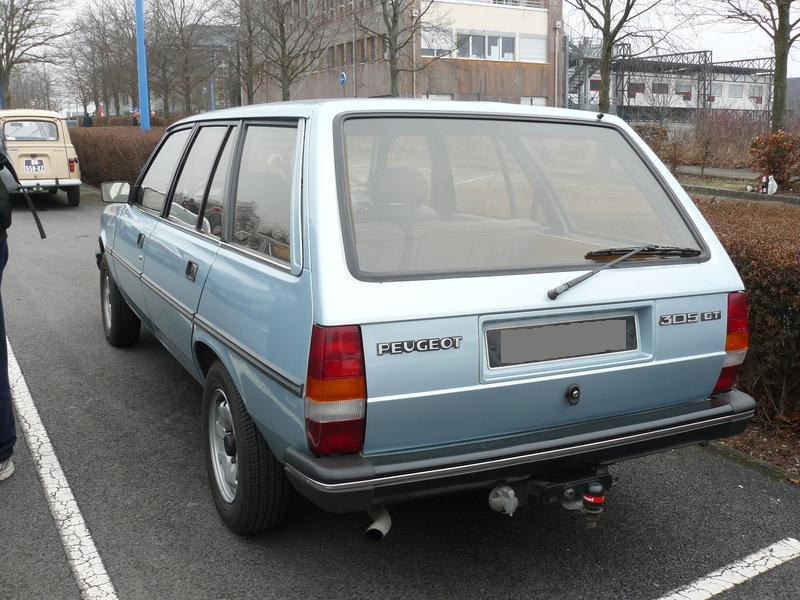
Late 305 GT Break

The facelifted, series 2 models arrived at the Paris Salon in late 1982, to keep the 305 competitive with newer designs like the Ford Sierra and the new version of the Vauxhall Cavalier/Opel Ascona. They had revised frontal styling, new improved front suspension and steering, a new dashboard and a modified under bonnet and subframe layout to allow the new generation of XU series engines with 5-speed gearbox to be fitted. Thus switching from the Mini type in-sump gearbox arrangement used also in the 204 and 304 to the now-universal end-on gearbox configuration (pioneered by Fiat in the 1960s Autobianchi Primula), of front-wheel drive with a transverse engine and a gearbox on the end of the engine and unequal-length drive shafts. However, the GL / GR and van models continued to use the earlier XL/XR series engines with four-speed gearbox for a few more years. The diesel engine fitted to the phase 2 305 was capable of over 50 mpg (Imp). The engine at the time was regarded as the best diesel around where most other engines notably those from Volkswagen and British Leyland sounded agricultural in comparison.

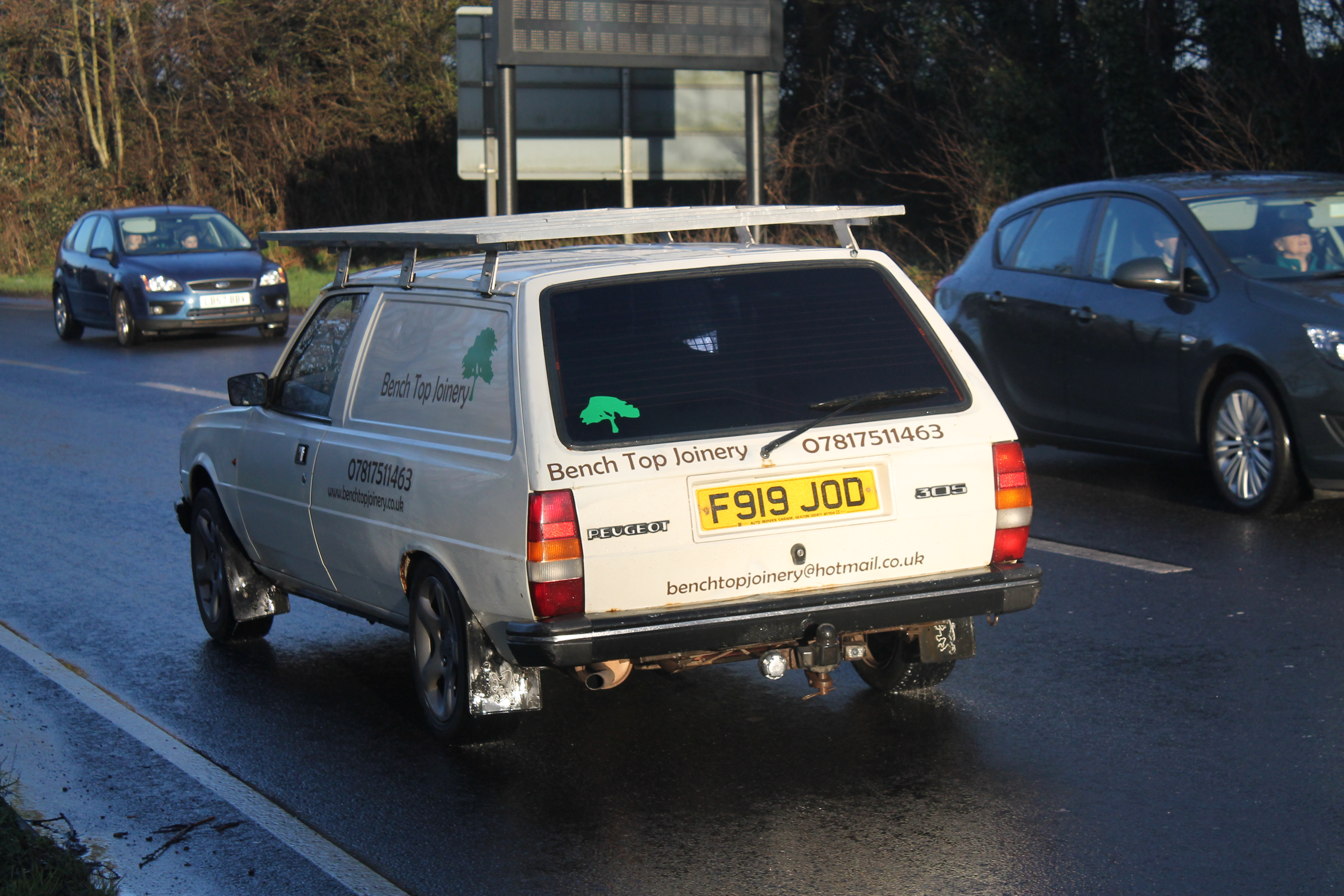
Peugeot 305 GL Van

Sales of the 305 were strong in France and most other countries where the car was sold, In Britain, its original competitors were the Ford Cortina MK4, Vauxhall Cavalier MK1 and Morris Marina. It was launched around the same time as its key French rival, the Renault 18. Later in its production life, it was competing with newer rivals including the Ford Sierra, MK2 Vauxhall Cavalier, Austin Montego, Renault 21, and the British-built Nissan Bluebird.

In 1979, the 305 won 1979 the What Car? Car of the Year in the United Kingdom, although it was largely overlooked by the motoring press for that year's European Car of the Year award, who voted the Chrysler/Simca Horizon as the winner, the Fiat Ritmo/Strada in second place and the Audi 80 in third place.

Production of saloons in France ceased in 1988, following the launch of the slightly larger and more powerful Peugeot 405, which proved a much stronger seller in the United Kingdom. Production of 305 estates ceased in 1989 and did not see a direct replacement until the launch of the 306 estate in 1997. The three-door Van (Fourgonnette, or Break Service in the home market) continued to be built until June 1990 and was not replaced. A total of 86,413 Fourgonnettes were built, making it the least common bodystyle by a substantial margin.

Although it was a reasonably common sight on Britain's roads throughout the 1980s and until well into the 1990s, just 76 examples of the 305 were reported to be on Britain's roads by February 2016.

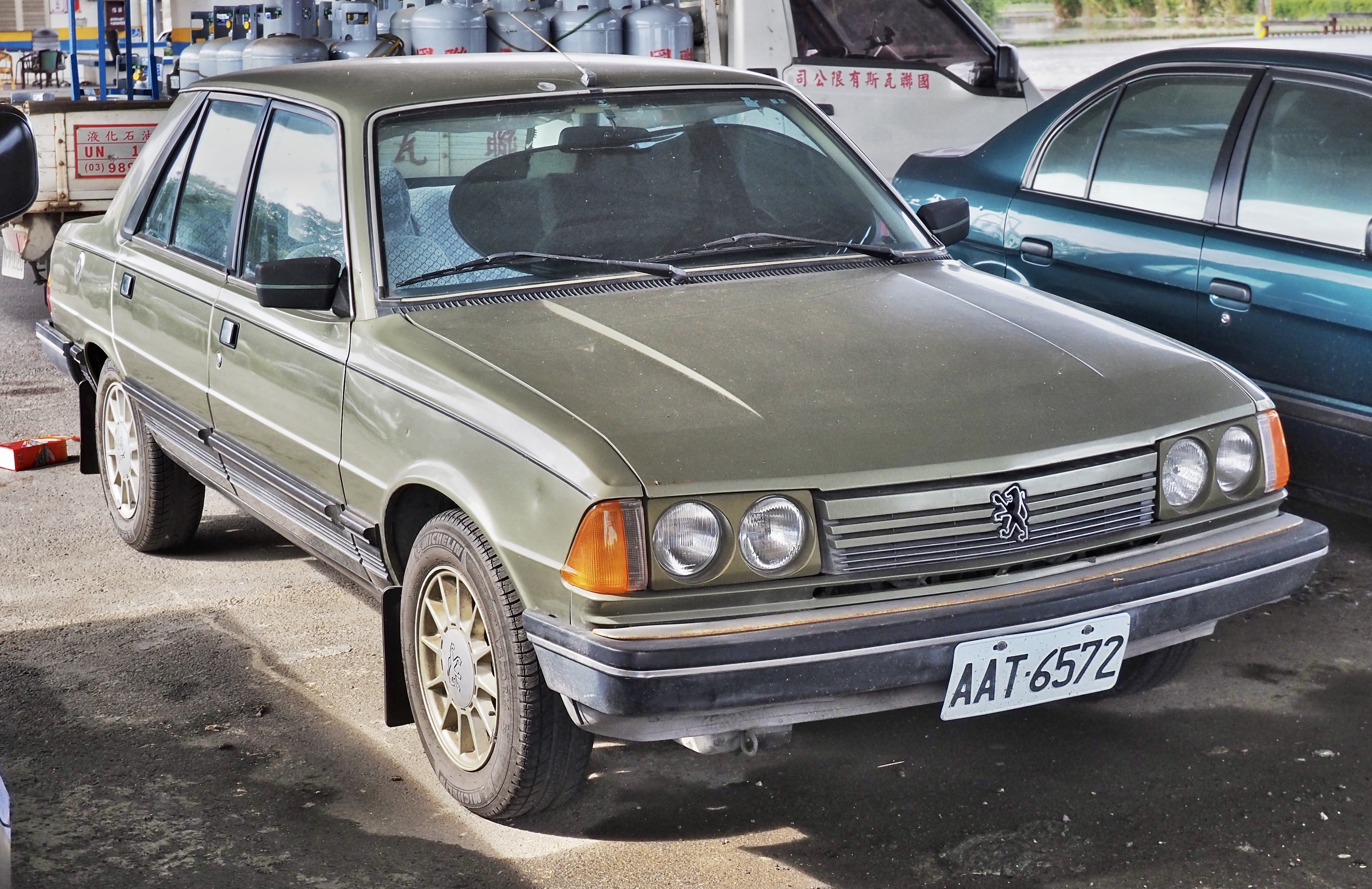
Taiwanese Peugeot 305

The vehicle stayed in production on Yǔtián assembly lines in Dacun, Taiwan until 1993. It received in this country a facelift during 1990. In Taiwan, the 305 was often marketed under more evocative names, such as Flying Fish (305 GTX) or Skipper (305 SR and GL).

== Body design ==
The body was done by Italian stylist Pininfarina and was completely new. It was all-steel monocoque which strongly resembled the BMW 3 Series of the time. The design is based on Peugeot's 'VSS' prototype safety vehicle, which Peugeot created to improve car safety. This meant that the car had front and rear crumple zones, side impact protection, a protected fuel tank and bolt-on front wings. Three bodystyles were available, consisting of a conventional three-box four-door sedan, a five-door station wagon, and a three-door panel van.

=== VERA ===
A series of aerodynamic research studies called VERA (Véhicule Économe de Recherche Appliquée, "applied research in economical vehicles") was also begun in 1981. The first model was a petrol-engined version (VERA 01) with a 63 hp (46 kW) engine, topping out at 155 km/h (96 mph). The cars were significantly lightened; the VERA 02 went from 925 to 750 kg or 2,040 to 1,650 lb and made more aerodynamic. A large rear wing, skirts covering parts of the rear wheels, and deeply scalloped sections behind the front wheels were all noticeable. The Cx was reduced from 0.44 to 0.319, helping lower fuel consumption between 33 and 38 percent. At the 1982 Geneva Salon the VERA 02, with a 1362 cc turbodiesel, was shown, and the more radical VERA Plus followed later in 1982 - this was no more than a thinly veiled Peugeot 309 prototype.

== Suspension ==
The 305 estate marked the debut of the now standard PSA Peugeot Citroën rear suspension layout. This is fully independent using trailing arms. It is very compact and was designed to minimise suspension intrusion into the wide flat loadspace, while providing excellent ride and handling. This was later developed (in other Peugeots) to use torsion bars instead of the 305's horizontal coil springs, and it was a key ingredient of the success of the Peugeot 205. The torsion bars system was very similar to those used by Renault and Simca for many years previously.

== Links ==
http://planete305.fr
