= Renault Farma =

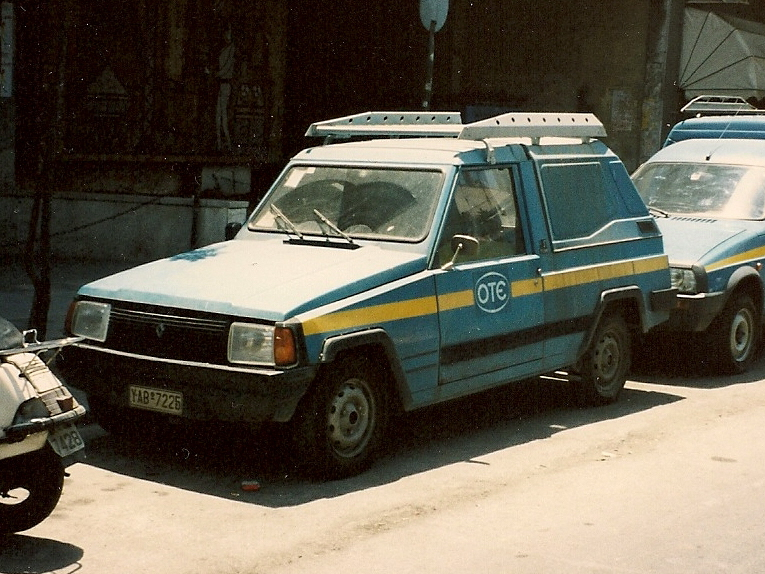
- The first version of the MAVA-Renault Farma.

Overview
- Manufacturer: Mava S.A.
- Also called: MAVA-Renault Farma
- Production: 1983–1985
- Assembly: Greece: Athens
- Designer: Georgios Michael

Body and chassis
- Class: Light commercial vehicle
- Body style: 2-door panel van
- Layout: Front-engine, front-wheel-drive
- Related: Renault 4

Powertrain
- Engine: 845 cc I4 (petrol)

Dimensions
- Length: 3.69 m
- Width: 1.50 m
- Height: 1.48 m
- Kerb weight: 680 kg

The Renault Farma is a compact automobile produced by Athens-based MAVA-Renault and was available in various versions, including passenger and van types. It was equipped with a 4-cylinder, 845 cc engine producing 34 hp (25 kW) and could achieve a top speed of approximately 110 km/h (68 mph).

== Overview ==
A total of 4,500 units were produced, including the "pure jeep-type" Σ model introduced in 1983, along with some minor facelifts. The car received modest publicity in the European press. By 1985, changes in Greek law affected the market for such vehicles, rendering production unprofitable. Michael and his team then developed a new model, the Farma Change, which was more advanced and particularly attractive. However, by that time, MAVA had abandoned the project, and only one prototype of the Farma Change was built.

== History ==
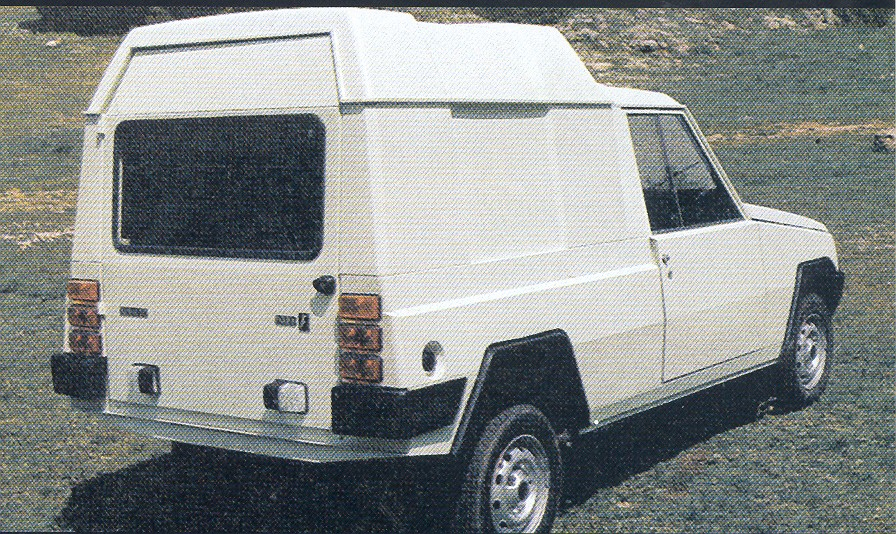
MAVA-Renault Farma F

MAVA Company, the Greek importer of Renault automobiles, ventured into car production in 1979 by introducing a passenger-utility vehicle, a type popular in Greece due to tax categorization benefits. The company assigned the car's creation to Georgios Michael, a Greek designer known for his work on the Neorion Chicago and several other Greek vehicles. Michael and his team completed the development and prototype construction (using Renault mechanicals) in record time, and the car, named Farma, was launched the same year. MAVA insisted that the car be presented as a "Renault model," and the prototype was subsequently tested and approved by the French company.

== See also ==
- Oyak-Renault
- Bulgarrenault

== Bibliography ==
- L.S. Skartsis; G.A. Avramidis (2003). Made in Greece. Patras, Greece: Typorama. ISBN 960-7620-30-5. (republished by the University of Patras Science Park, 2007)
- L.S. Skartsis, "Modern Greece's Machines: A Comprehensive Guide to Greek Vehicle & Machine Manufacturers (1700 to Present)" (2026) ISBN 978-618-00-6734-7 (eBook)
- K. Bitsikokos (Feb 29, 2008). "Affordable cars made in Greece". Auto Bild (Hellas). No. 22.
