= Peugeot 304 =

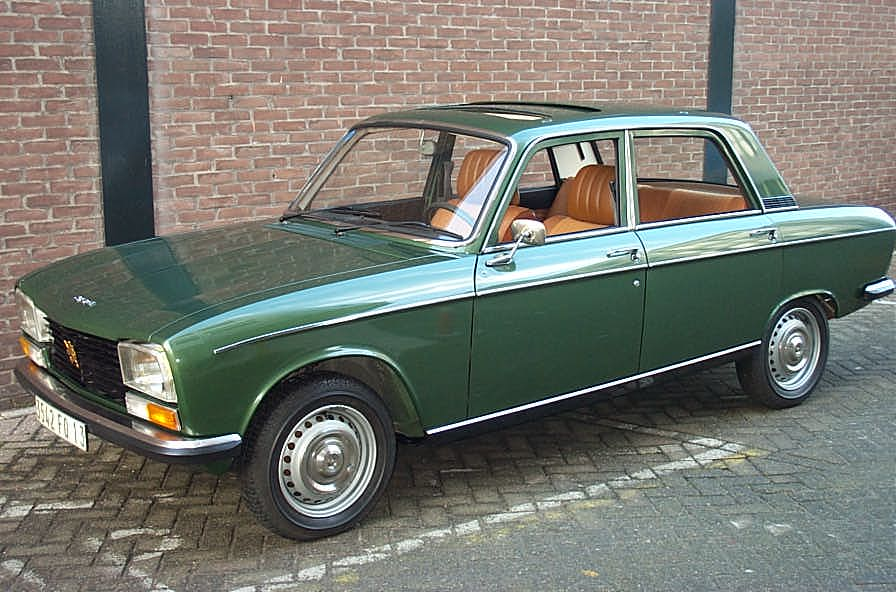
- Peugeot 304 Saloon

Overview
- Manufacturer: Peugeot SA (1969–1976); PSA Group (1976–1980)
- Production: 1969–1980; 1,178,423 produced
- Assembly: France: Sochaux (Sochaux Plant); France: Mulhouse (Mulhouse Plant)
- Designer: Aldo Brovarone at Pininfarina

Body and chassis
- Class: Small family car/Large family car (C/D)
- Body style: 4-door saloon; 5-door estate ("break"); 3-door coupé; 2-door convertible; 3-door van ("fourgonette")
- Layout: FF layout
- Related: Peugeot 204

Powertrain
- Engine: Petrol: 1,127 cc XK5 I4; 1,130 cc XK4 I4 (Greece only); 1,288 cc XL3/XL3S I4; 1,290 cc XL5/XL5S I4; Diesel: 1,357 cc XL4D I4; 1,548 cc XIDL I4

Dimensions
- Wheelbase: 2,590 mm (102.0 in) saloon
- Length: 4,140 mm (163.0 in) saloon
- Width: 1,570 mm (61.8 in) saloon
- Height: 1,410 mm (55.5 in) saloon
- Curb weight: 890–970 kg (1,962–2,138 lb)

Chronology
- Predecessor: Peugeot 204
- Successor: Peugeot 305

The Peugeot 304 is a small family car manufactured and marketed by the French manufacturer Peugeot from 1969 to 1980.

The 304 was introduced to the public at the Paris Motor Show in September 1969. It made extensive use of Peugeot 204 body and mechanical parts. Production of the saloon/sedan on the Sochaux assembly lines was discontinued during the summer of 1979, while the "Break" (estate / station wagon) was manufactured until the spring of 1980. The 304 fit into the 7CV tax category, one step above its little sister the 204 (6CV) and significantly below the 9CV 404.

The 304 was a success for Peugeot and was noted for its Pininfarina styled exterior; It was marketed until 1980 and was replaced by the Peugeot 305, which was launched in 1977, still based on the Peugeot 204. The chassis lasted for approximately 24 years when derivative models (the 204 and 305) are included.

== History ==
Peugeot conceived the 304, noting a gap in the midsize car market in France, Italy and the rest of Western Europe, and used the smaller 204's midsection, to minimize development costs and maximize return. The 304's main competitors on its home market came from Renault and Simca, with Citroën noticeably absent from this sector at the launch. At introduction, only a single model was available: a four-door sedan (berline) with Super-Luxe equipment.

The 304 was also built in a version meeting federal standards for sale in the United States. The 304 did not sell particularly well in North America, though, and the federal version was only produced between June 1970 and July 1972. Introduced in the latter half of 1970 as a 1971 model year car, the station wagon arrived during calendar year 1971 (production beginning in November 1970). 1,407 were sold during calendar year 1970, 2,153 cars during 1971, with a final 709 cars delivered during 1972 (4,269 sold in total).

== Engines ==
The 304 was launched with an all alloy SOHC four-cylinder 1,288 cc petrol engine (XL3), directly derived from the 1130 cc XK3 engine fitted to the earlier 204. A more powerful S version of the engine, sporting a twin choke/twin barrel carburettor (XL3S), became an option on the coupé and cabriolet in March 1972. The S engines provided a 10 hp (7 kW) output increase to 75 hp (55 kW) and also became available on the 304 saloon in the autumn of 1972.

Various detailed modifications were made to the engine in 1975 which boosted torque and included a marginal displacement increase to 1,290 cc (XL5/XL5S). After the 204 had been discontinued, the 304 Break and Fourgonette also became available with a new 1127 cc petrol engine (XK5, modified in a similar manner to the XL5) to fit this opening at the lower end of the market. The new 6CV 304 Break and Fourgonette were introduced at the 1976 Paris Show.

In order to meet federal emissions standards in the United States, the engine used there was lightly modified. It had a reduced compression ratio of 7.5 to 1 (rather than the usual 8.8 ratio) and a slightly changed carburettor. Claimed power is 70 hp (52 kW) SAE Gross in 1970, the 1972 models used the SAE net rating which is very similar to DIN and have a claimed maximum output of 58 hp (43 kW). In the Greek market there was a significant tax threshold at 1,200 cc. In order to stay beneath this, the 304 Berline was sold with the 204's 1130 cc XK4 engine since October 1971. In September 1975, this changed over to the lightly changed XK5 engine; production of the special Greek model ended in March 1978.

A 1,357 cc diesel engine became available for the saloon from July 1976, and for the estate and "fourgonette" van two months later. In July 1979, a larger 1,548 cc diesel engine was offered; this was the engine also installed in early versions of the Peugeot 305. Only available for a little over three years, Peugeot still built more than 120,000 diesel 304s.

== Running gear ==
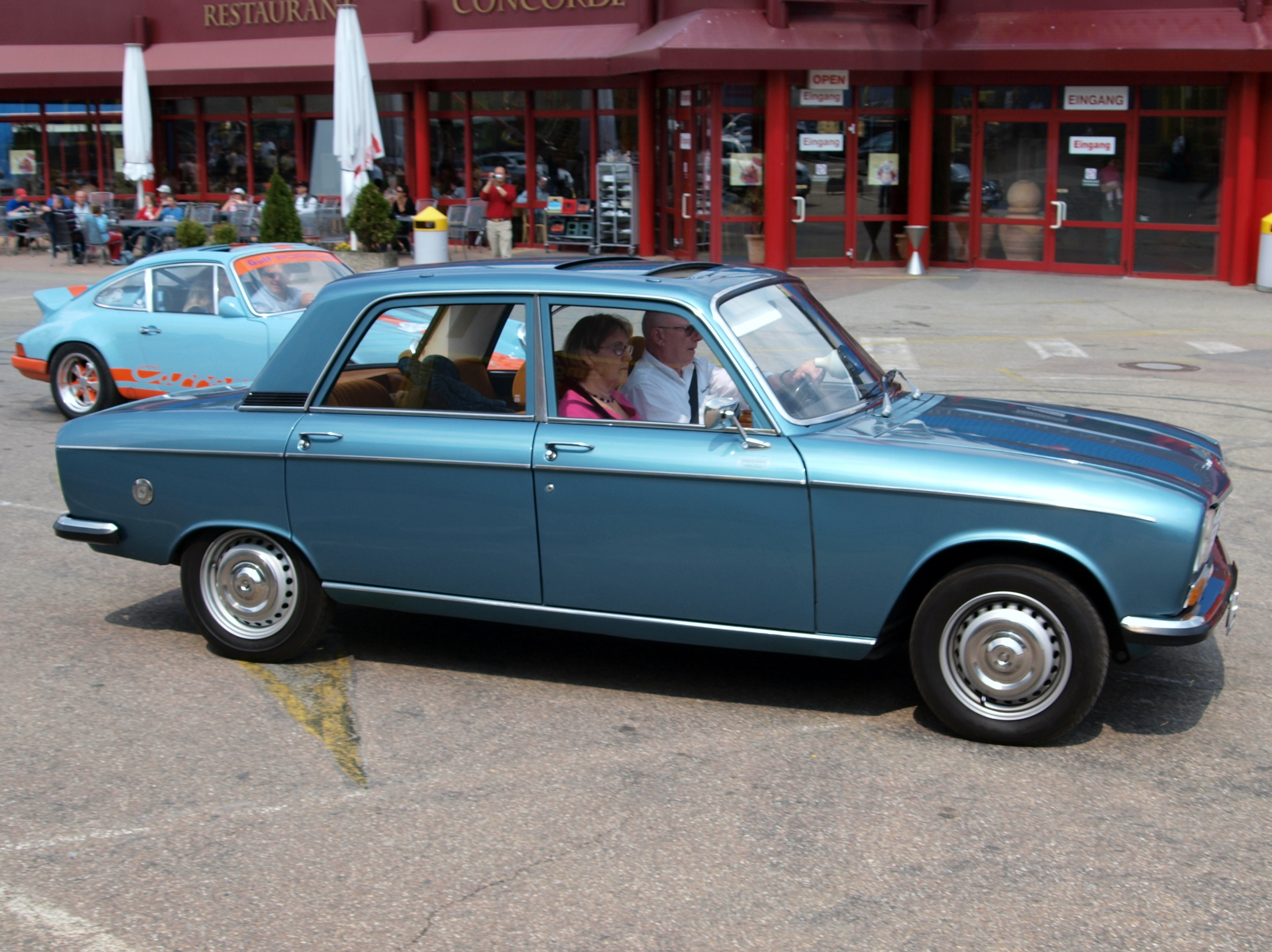
1976 Peugeot 304 SLS, featuring the simplified treatment of the front- and back- ends on the later post-face-lift cars

The car was moderately advanced for its time, having fully independent suspension, and a four-speed gearbox located directly below the engine, sharing the same oil as the engine. Although most interior components were interchangeable with the 204, the 304 had a floor-mounted gear change in place of the column-mounted control in the smaller car. The transverse-engine front-wheel-drive configuration conferred enhanced cabin space, although this was no longer such an unusual feature as it had been for the 204 back in 1965. The 304 also incorporated front disc brakes and headlights that could adjust for left/right hand drive.

== Bodies ==
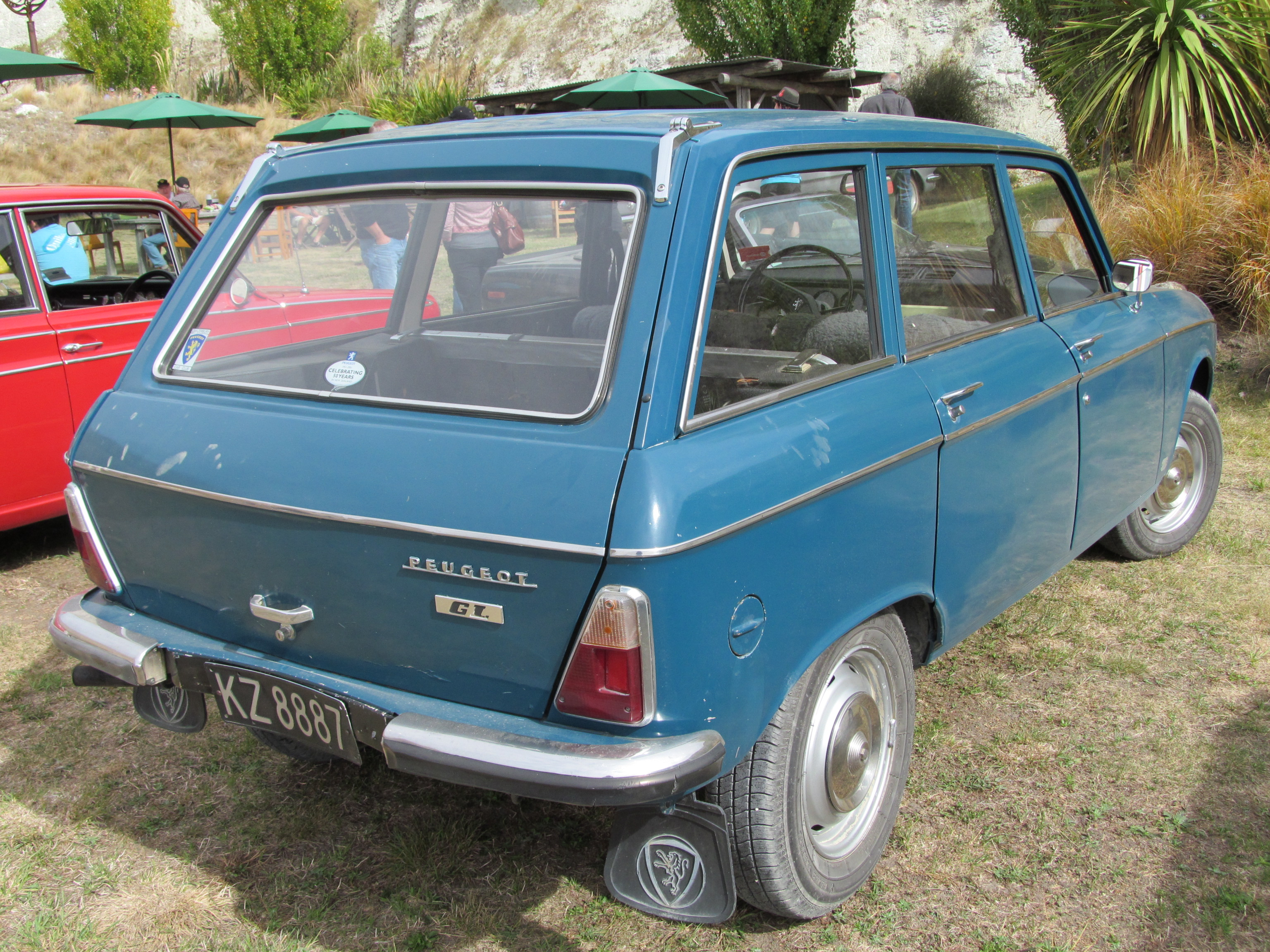
Peugeot 304 Break

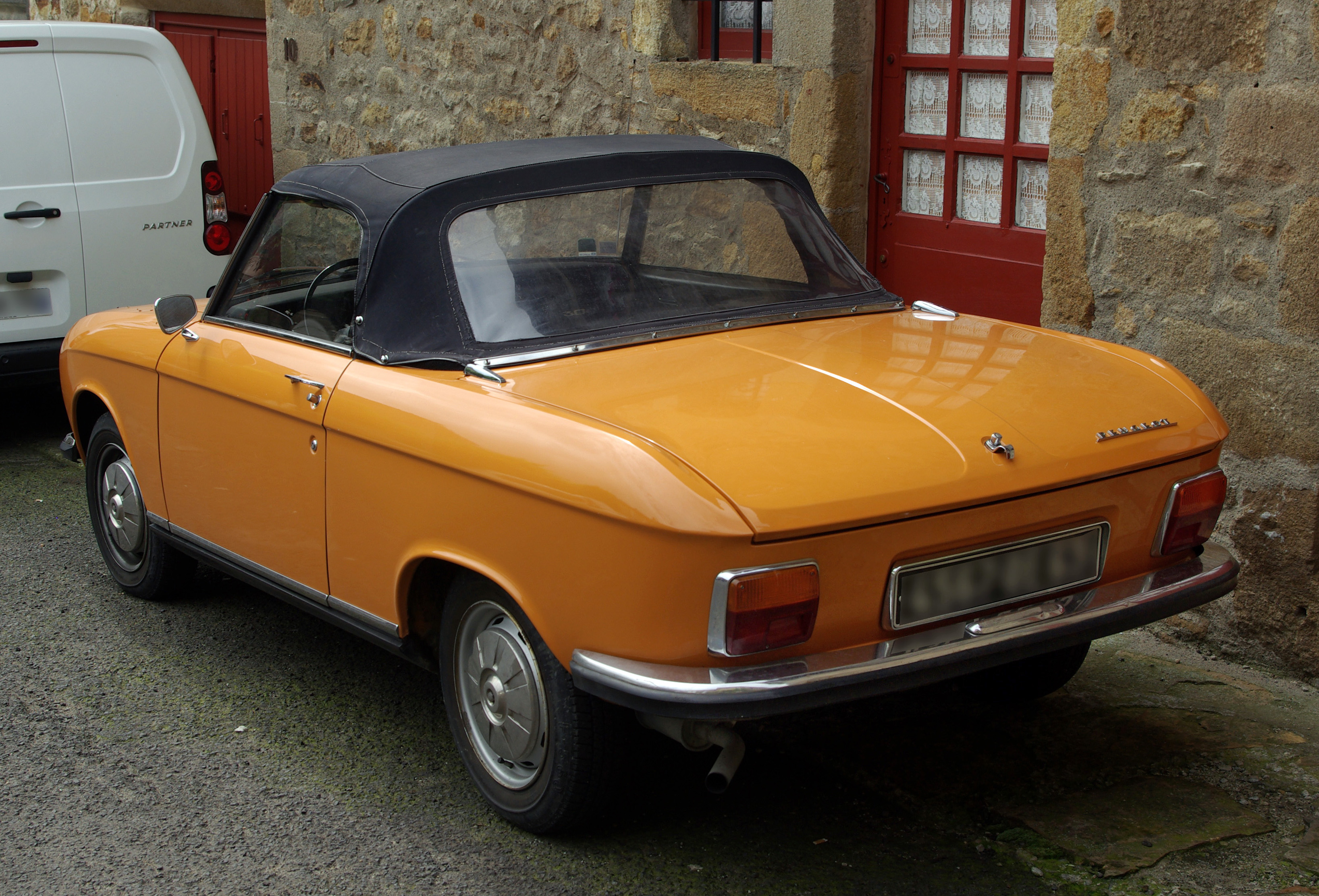
Peugeot 304 Cabriolet

The 304 was designed to slot between the popular 204 and the recently introduced Peugeot 504. Since the 204 had an exceptionally spacious passenger cabin for its class, the 304 body used the central portion of the 204: engine and running gear components were mostly interchangeable between the two cars. However, the 304 had a restyled front grille and headlights, designed consciously to emulate the 504 which had received a generally positive market reception.

More substantial differences occurred at the rear of the saloon, where overhang on the 304 was 13.5 cm (5.5 inches) longer than on the 204: this allowed for a larger boot/trunk. However, estate and two-door versions shared their (shorter) rear ends with corresponding models in the 204 range. Coupé and cabriolet versions replaced their 204 forerunners in March 1970, being the first models to receive the "S" version of the engine two years later in March 1972. The lower powered cabriolet and coupé 304s were withdrawn from the market in July 1972 and August 1973 respectively, leaving only the S models.

Originally only offered as a sedan, the Break (station wagon) model appeared in September 1970 and largely completed the lineup. The three-door fourgonette (panel van) version of the 304 appeared only in September 1977, as a belated replacement for the 204 fourgonette which had disappeared from the production lines the previous year.

The 304 was updated considerably in September 1972. On the outside, the saloon received a simplified, yet larger rear light cluster design, and the Peugeot badge appearing on the front grille now took on a gold coloured solid form in place of the silver/grey coloured outline badge that the car had worn hitherto. The roof line of the saloon was discreetly squared off to give greater headroom for rear passengers: the window frames on the rear doors were modified correspondingly, adding about an inch and a half to their rearmost upper edge and making them unique to the 304, while the car's front doors remained interchangeable with those on the 204. Also air vents were added to the C-pillars. Further, the interior saw new round-dial instruments in the dashboard. And the saloon became available in S-version, with the more powerful engine as used in the coupé and cabriolet, plus their additional equipment like a rev counter. Over the years, changes under the metal were limited: the replacement of the dynamo with an alternator in mid-1971 (standard on the Break, Coupé, and Cabriolet from the beginning). In February 1974, somewhat wider tyres became standard fitment on the sedan and Break. The hydraulically operated clutch was replaced with a cable operated mechanism in 1977, while in 1978 the MacPherson front suspension of the 305 was adopted.

== Commercial ==
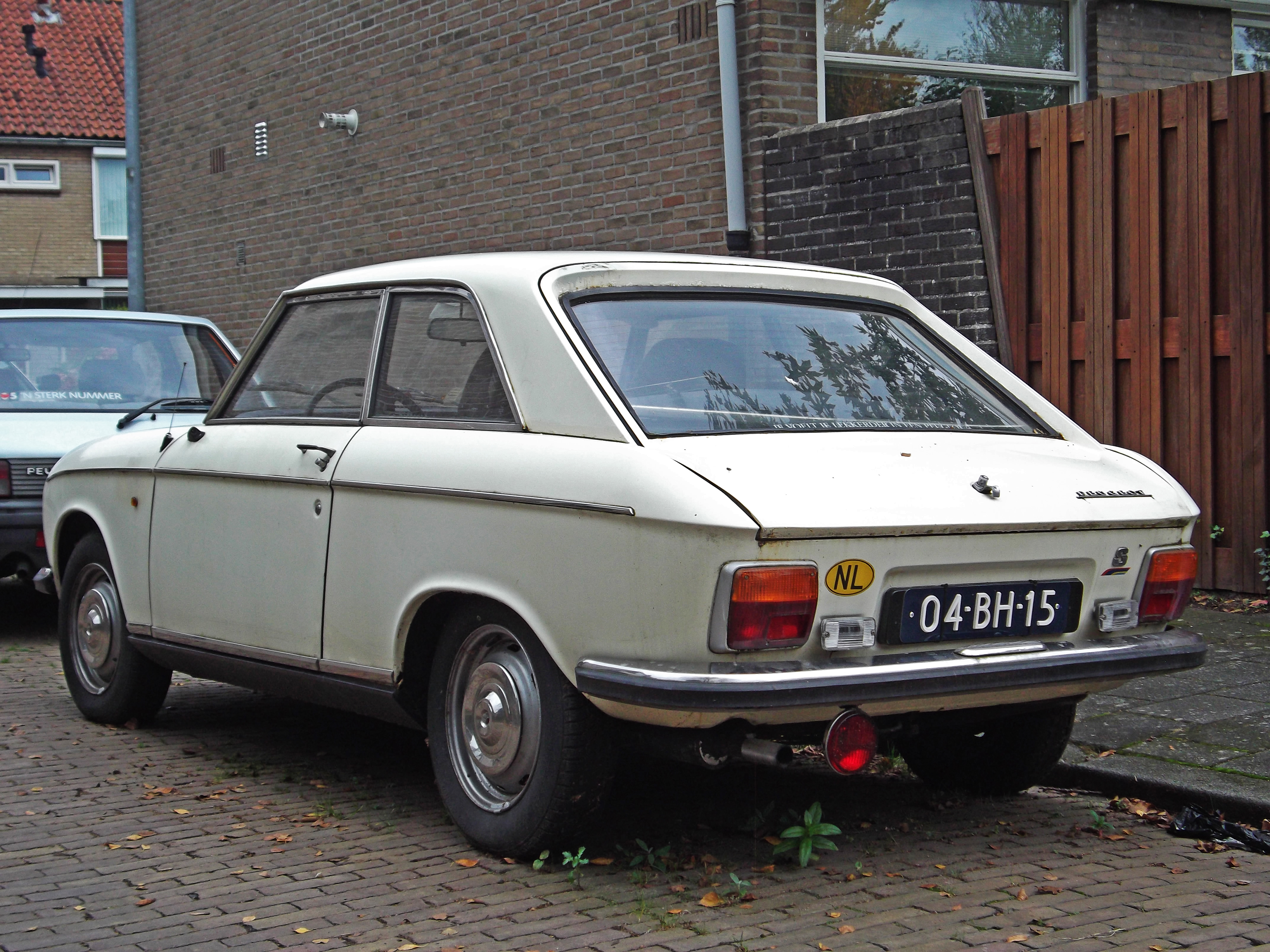
Peugeot 304 coupé

Launched in 1969, the Peugeot 304 confronted a more competitive market place than the one that had greeted the 204 in 1965. From the start it found itself in a fight for market share with the Renault 12 also introduced at the 1969 motor show: after the launch in 1970 of the Citroën GS, competition intensified further. Nevertheless, the entire segment was boosted by the 1973 oil price shock as motorists traded down from larger cars. The Peugeot was particularly popular with the police and other public services both within France and in the Saarland region of Germany where the German Peugeot importer is based and where locally, for historical reasons, Peugeot traditionally enjoyed a level of market penetration usually reserved, at that time, for domestically branded makes.

The 304 saloon remained in production until 1979, by when a saloon version of the Peugeot 305 had been on sale for two years: the break (estate) 304 continued until Summer 1980, by when an estate version of the 305 had been introduced. By 1980, when the last 304 Breaks came off the lines at Mulhouse, 1,178,423 Peugeot 304s had been produced. Of these, approximately 36 percent were exported, mostly within Europe: during the 1970s Peugeot was one of several European manufacturers successfully learning to treat the entire EEC region as a single market.

The estate version was also exported to North Africa, where many were deployed as taxis and louages. In Egypt, the estate version of the 304 remained one of the most widespread types of vehicle in taxi service as late as 2009, though the government is hoping to persuade taxi drivers to adopt more recently manufactured, more government-imposed emissions compliant vehicles.

== Cabriolet ==
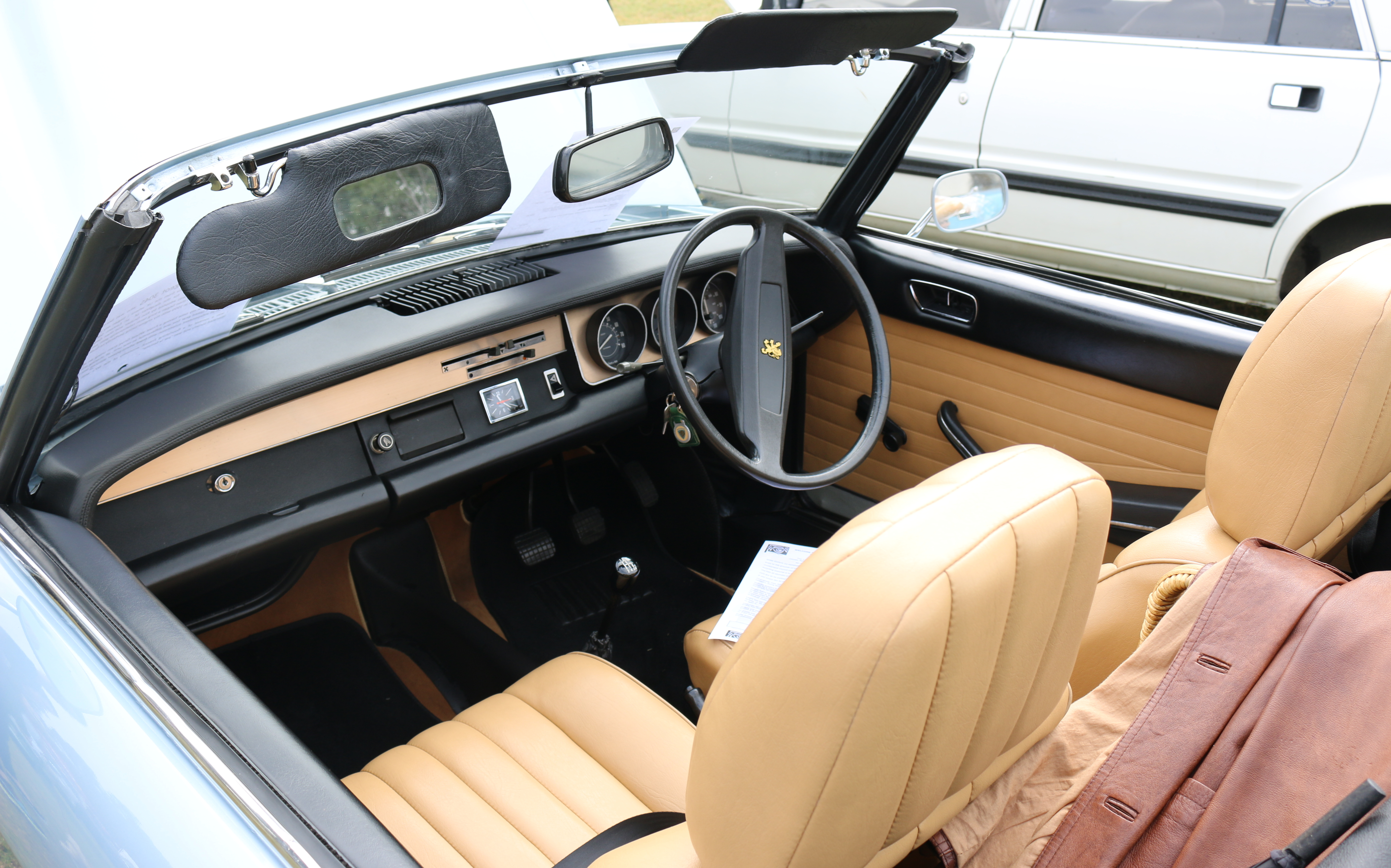
1972 Peugeot 304 cabriolet interior

The Peugeot 304 was also offered as a 2-door cabriolet which had only two seats, unlike the four-seater coupé. Just under 19,000 cabriolets were produced from 1970-1975, of which 836 were produced in right hand drive and imported into the UK. Of these, all but 244 were the "S" versions. The more powerful 304 S was introduced in March 1972 and became the only version of the cabriolet after July the same year.

== Data ==
Technical data Peugeot 304 (Manufacturer's figures except where stated)
Peugeot 304	4-door saloon/sedan	5-door Break	3-door Coupé	2-door Cabriolet	3-door Fourgonette (van)
Produced: (units)	Sep 1969 – Jul 1979 (849,103)	Sep 1970 – May 1980 (216,183)	Mar 1970 – Jul 1975 (60,186)	Mar 1970 – Jul 1975 (18,647)	Sep 1976 - May 1980 (34,304)
Engine:	Four-stroke sohc 4-cylinder motor, transversely mounted. Aluminium block with replaceable wetliners				
Displacements: petrol/gasoline engines	1,288 cc (1969–1975) 1,290 cc (1975–1979)	1,288 cc (1970–1975); 1,127 cc (1976–1980); 1,290 cc (1975–1980)	1,288 cc	1,288 cc	1,127 cc (1976–1980); 1,290 cc (1976–1980)
Displacements: diesel engines	1,357 cc (1976–1979)	1,357 cc (1976–1980); 1,548 cc (1979–1980)			1,357 cc (1976–1980); 1,548 cc (1979–1980)
Max. Power petrol/gasoline engines bhp DIN (kW): Older sources may use higher bhp SAE values.	65 bhp (48 kW) (1969–1975); 75 bhp (55 kW) (1972–1978); 65 bhp (48 kW) (1975–1979)	65 bhp (48 kW) (1970–1975); 59 bhp (43 kW) (1976–1980); 65 bhp (48 kW) (1975–1980)	65 bhp (48 kW) (1970–1973); 75 bhp (55 kW) (1972–1975)	65 bhp (48 kW) (1970–1972); 75 bhp (55 kW) (1972–1975)	59 bhp (43 kW) (1976–1980); 65 bhp (48 kW) (1976–1980)
Max. Power diesel engines bhp DIN (kW): Older sources may use bhp SAE values.	45 bhp (33 kW) (1976–1979)	45 bhp (33 kW) (1976–1980); 47 bhp (35 kW) (1979–1980)			45 bhp (33 kW) (1976–1980); 47 bhp (35 kW) (1979–1980)
Max. Torque petrol/gasoline engines	94.2 N⋅m (69.5 lb⋅ft) (1969–1975); 101 N⋅m (74 lb⋅ft) (1972–1978); 94.2 N⋅m (69.5 lb⋅ft) (1975–1979)	94.2 N⋅m (69.5 lb⋅ft) (1970–1975); 80.4 N⋅m (59.3 lb⋅ft) (1976–1980); 94.2 N⋅m (69.5 lb⋅ft) (1975–1980)	94.2 N⋅m (69.5 lb⋅ft) (1970–1973); 101 N⋅m (74 lb⋅ft) (1972–1975)	94.2 N⋅m (69.5 lb⋅ft) (1970–1973); 101 N⋅m (74 lb⋅ft) (1972–1975)	80.4 N⋅m (59.3 lb⋅ft) (1976–1980); 94.2 N⋅m (69.5 lb⋅ft) (1976–1980)
Max. Torque diesel engines	77 N⋅m (57 lb⋅ft) (1976–1979)	77 N⋅m (57 lb⋅ft) (1976–1980); 85 N⋅m (63 lb⋅ft) (1979–1980)			77 N⋅m (57 lb⋅ft) (1976–1980); 85 N⋅m (63 lb⋅ft) (1979–1980)
Transmission:	Four speed manual:all forward ratios with synchromesh. Front-wheel drive				
Brakes:	Front discs: Rear drums				
(Body type)	(4-door saloon)	(5-door estate)	(3-door hatch coupé)	(2-door cabriolet)	(fourgonette)
Track front/ rear:	1,320 mm (52.0 in); 1,290 mm (50.8 in)	1,320 mm (52.0 in); 1,290 mm (50.8 in)	1,320 mm (52.0 in); 1,290 mm (50.8 in)	1,320 mm (52.0 in); 1,290 mm (50.8 in)	1,320 mm (52.0 in); 1,260 mm (49.6 in)
Wheelbase:	2,590 mm (102.0 in)	2,590 mm (102.0 in)	2,310 mm (90.9 in)	2,310 mm (90.9 in)	2,590 mm (102.0 in)
Length:	4,140 mm (163.0 in)	3,990 mm (157.1 in)	3,760 mm (148.0 in)	3,760 mm (148.0 in)	4,010 mm (157.9 in)
Width:	1,570 mm (61.8 in)	1,570 mm (61.8 in)	1,570 mm (61.8 in)	1,570 mm (61.8 in)	1,570 mm (61.8 in)
Height empty/ loaded	1,410 mm (55.5 in); 1,350 mm (53.1 in)	1,430 mm (56.3 in); 1,370 mm (53.9 in)	1,320 mm (52.0 in); 1,300 mm (51.2 in)	1,330 mm (52.4 in); 1,300 mm (51.2 in)	1,430 mm (56.3 in); 1,350 mm (53.1 in)
