= Renault 10 =

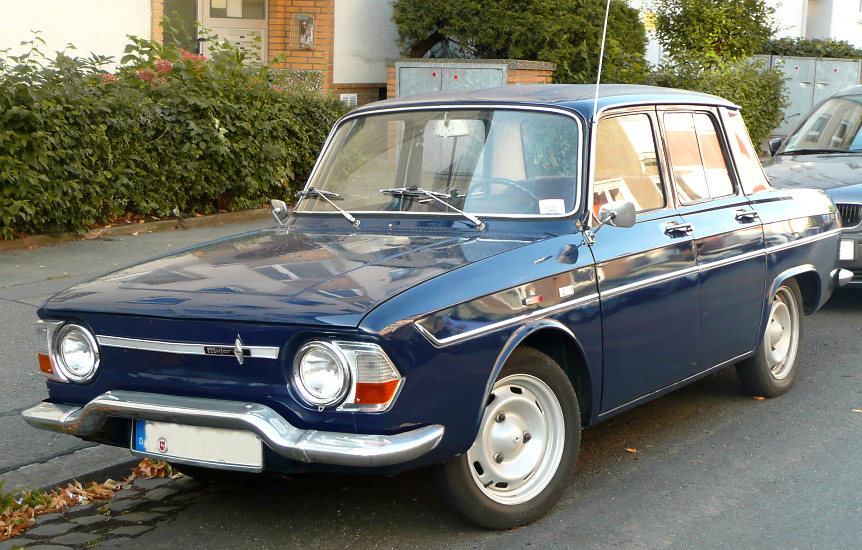
- Renault 10, pre-facelift (1965–1967)

Overview
- Manufacturer: Renault
- Also called: Renault 10 Major; Renault 1100; Bulgarrenault 10
- Production: 1965–1972; 1966–1972 (Bulgaria)
- Assembly: France: Flins; Australia: Heidelberg, Victoria; Bulgaria: Plovdiv (Bulgarrenault); South Africa: East London; Spain: Valladolid (FASA-Renault)

Body and chassis
- Class: Small family car (C)
- Body style: 4-door saloon
- Layout: Rear-engine, rear-wheel-drive
- Related: Renault 8

Powertrain
- Engine: 1108 cc Type 688-02 I4; 1289 cc Type 810 I4
- Transmission: 4-speed manual

Dimensions
- Wheelbase: 2,270 mm (89.4 in)
- Length: 4,200 mm (165.4 in)
- Width: 1,490 mm (58.7 in)
- Height: 1,375 mm (54.1 in)

Chronology
- Predecessor: Renault 8
- Successor: Renault 12

The Renault 10 is a small family car which was produced by the French manufacturer Renault between 1965 and 1972. It is a four-door saloon car with a rear-engine, rear-wheel-drive layout. The 10 is larger, more upmarket version of the Renault 8, it was launched in 1965. In 1972 it was replaced by the front-wheel drive Renault 12, which was built in parallel for two years.

The 10 was also produced in Bulgaria until 1972 (see Bulgarrenault), and in Spain.

== History ==
In September 1965 the Renault 10 Major (branded in some markets as the Renault 1100) was launched, replacing the Renault 8 Major. This was a lengthened version of the Renault 8 with an increased front overhang and a much enlarged front luggage compartment, its capacity increased from 240 to 315 litres. The front and rear of the cars were fully redesigned, while the dimensions and sheetmetal of the central passenger cabin were unchanged. The 1,108 cc engine, which for some markets had already appeared in top of the range versions of the Renault 8, came from the Renault Caravelle. In the French market, the Renault 10 found itself struggling to compete with the successful Peugeot 204 introduced in the same year. In the United States, the Renault 10 was offered as "The Renault for people who swore they would never buy another one", after the Dauphine's disappointing reputation.

Early R10 had round headlights, but just two years after launch the 10 itself was facelifted, with rectangular headlights further differentiating it from the Renault 8. Round sealed beam headlights were maintained for the US and Canadian markets.

Alongside the Renault 10, less powerful versions of the Renault 8 continued in production at the Flins plant with the existing shorter body.

A larger unit, the 1289 cc engine from the new Renault 12, was fitted to the Renault 10 for the Motor Show in October 1970, giving birth to the Renault 10-1300. Although the engine mounted at the back of the Renault 10-1300 was in most respects identical to that fitted at the front of the Renault 12, the unit in the older car was effectively detuned, with a lowered compression ratio and a listed maximum output of 52 PS (38 kW; 51 hp) SAE (48 PS (35 kW; 47 hp) DIN) whereas the unit in the Renault 12 was advertised as providing 60 PS (44 kW; 59 hp) SAE (54 PS (40 kW; 53 hp) DIN). Renault thus offered two competing models in the same market category, but the older rear engined design came with a listed price 1,000 francs (approximately 10%) lower and a top speed of 135 km/h (84 mph) as against 145 km/h (90 mph) for the entry level Renault 12. The 1108 cc version of the engine was still offered for 1970, but only when combined with the Jaeger "button operated" semi-automatic transmission which had been offered in earlier versions of the car since 1963.

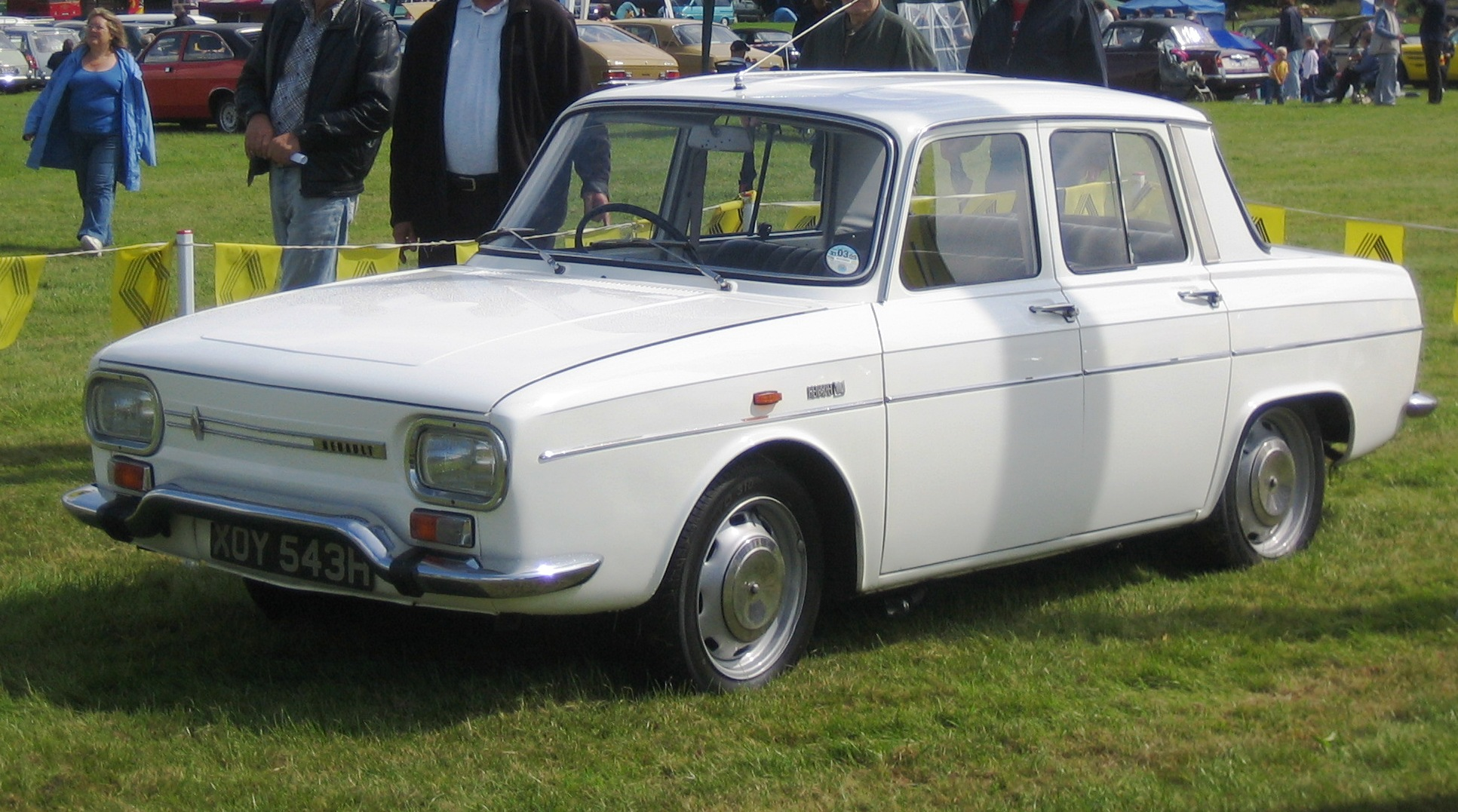
Renault 10 (1967–1970), square headlight version

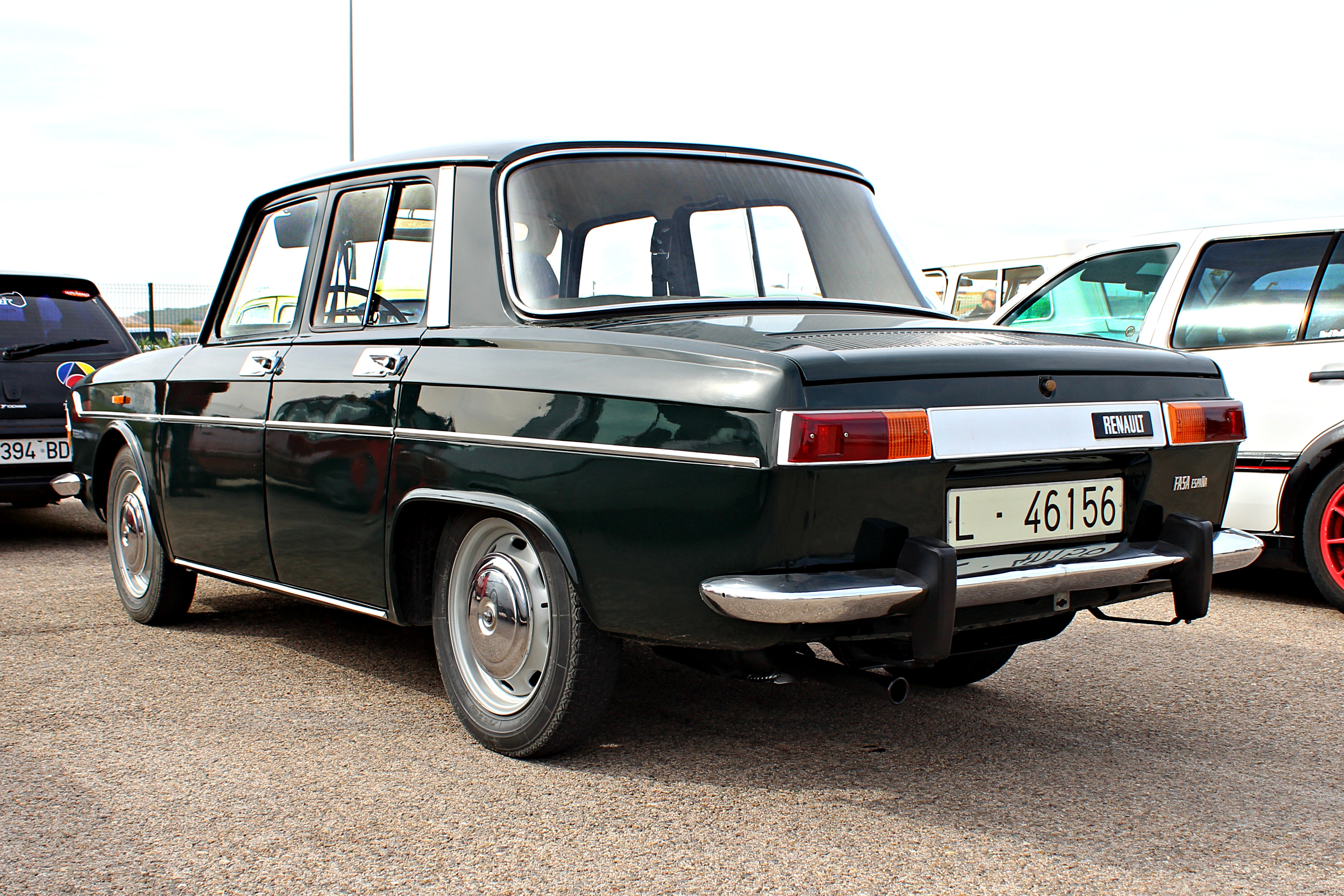
FASA-built Renault 10 (pre-facelift model)

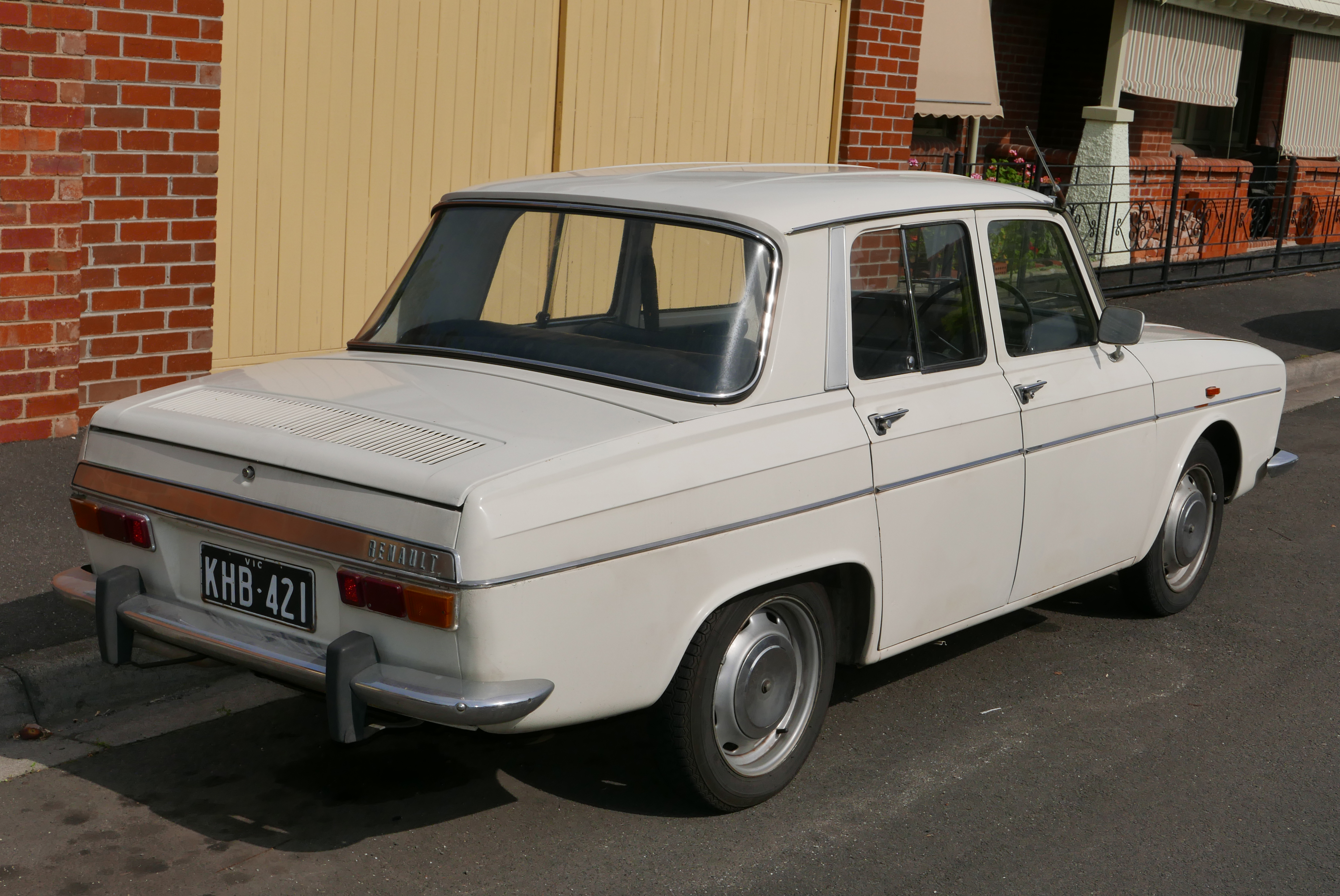
Rear view of facelift model (Australia)

=== End of production ===
French production of the Renault 10 ceased at the end of summer 1971, by which time the model had been selling for two years in parallel with the commercially more successful Renault 12. Although production of the Renault 10 ended in 1971, the 8 was still sold in France as late as 1973.

== Outside Europe ==
=== Alconi ===
Through their South African subsidiary, Renault Africa Ltd, a special performance version of the Renault 10 (model 1190) was assembled at their East London assembly plant. It sold in that country only as a Renault Alconi, a combination of the names of the developers, John Conchie and Eric 'Puddles' Adler, who traded as "Alconi Developments".

Engine upgrades resulted in 68 bhp (net) and a performance close to that of the R8 Gordini '1100' and midway between the standard Renault 8 and the 1255cc Gordini. They offered 0–60 mph (0–97 km/h) in 11.9 s, and a top speed of 97 mph (156 km/h) (according to "Car" magazine road test), for about 10% over the standard car.

It was sold new through their dealer network in South Africa and covered by their factory warranty. The local concept was intended to increase vehicle sales to a racing mad South African public by taking advantage of their race-track successes in local "Sprint" and "Endurance" races. About 400–500 vehicles (both 8 and 10) seem to have been sold. As well, many hundreds of performance kits to upgrade the standard vehicles were sold over their parts counters.
