= Peugeot 204 =

Small family car produced by Peugeot (1965–1976)

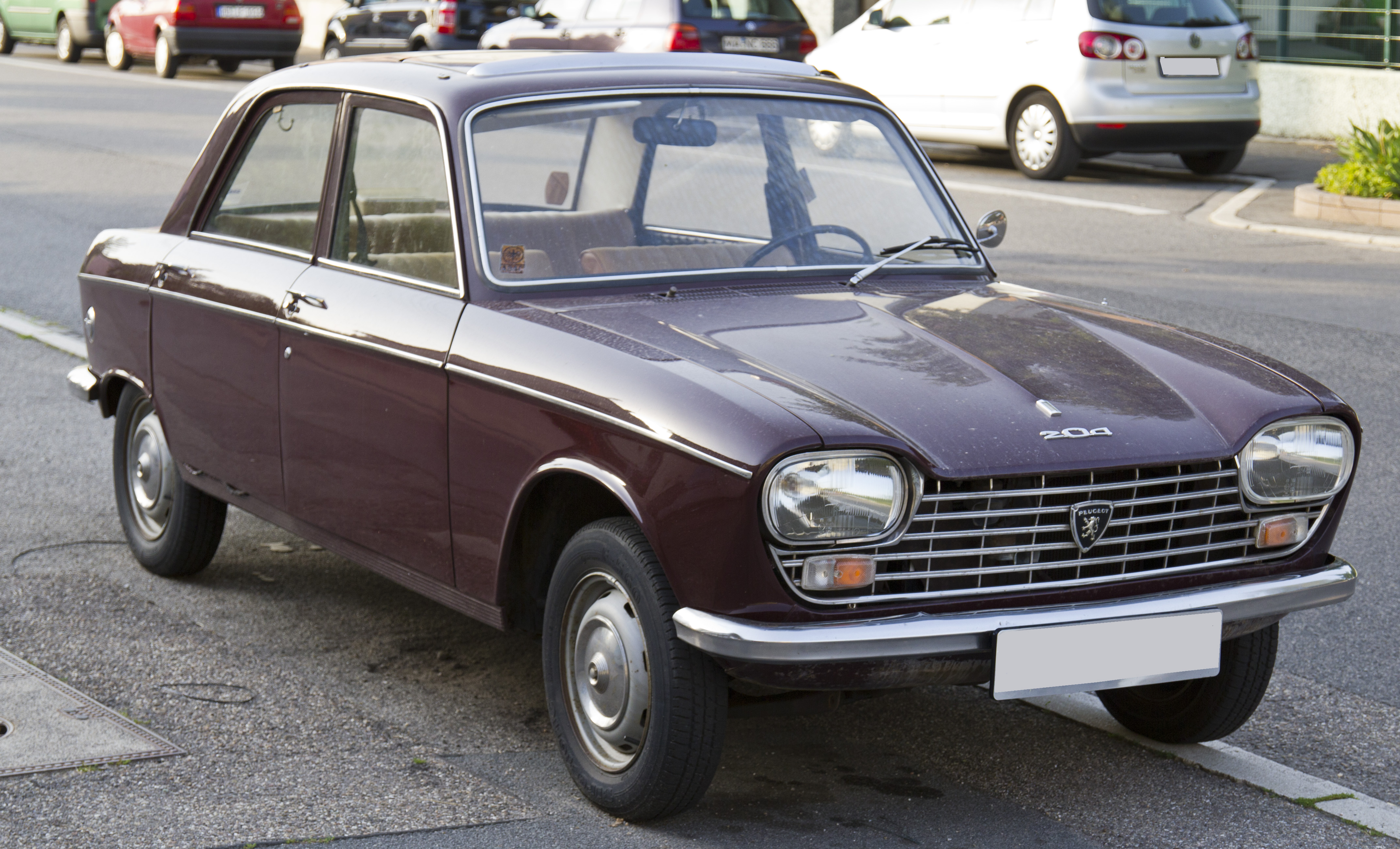

Overview
- Manufacturer: Peugeot SA
- Production: April 1965 – July 1976; 1,604,296 produced
- Assembly: France: Mulhouse (Mulhouse Plant)
- Designer: Battista Pininfarina

Body and chassis
- Class: Small family car (C)
- Body style: 4-door saloon; 4-door estate (break); 2-door coupé 2-door convertible; 2-door van
- Layout: Transverse FF layout
- Related: Peugeot 304

Powertrain
- Engine: petrol: 1127 cc XK5 I4; 1130 cc XK/XK4 I4; diesel: 1255 cc XLD I4; 1357 cc XL4D I4

Dimensions
- Wheelbase: 2,595 mm (102.2 in)
- Length: 3,990 mm (157 in)
- Width: 1,560 mm (61 in)
- Height: 1,400 mm (55 in) (saloon empty); 1,340 mm (53 in) (saloon loaded)
- Curb weight: 851 kg (1,876 lb)

Chronology
- Predecessor: Peugeot 203
- Successor: Peugeot 304; Peugeot 205

The Peugeot 204 is a small family car produced by the French manufacturer Peugeot between 1965 and 1976.

The 204, known in development as Project D12, was available in many body styles including a sedan/saloon/berline, convertible/cabriolet, hatchback/coupe, estate/wagon, and a van. It was launched in Paris, France, on 23 April 1965 and became the best-selling car in France from 1969 to 1971.

== Engine ==
The 204 used a front-wheel drive layout and was launched on 20 April 1965 with a single overhead cam 1130 cc petrol engine (the maximum allowed for the 6CV 'car tax' class in France). In September 1975, less than a year before production ceased, it received a more modern petrol engine, now of 1127 cc. Claimed maximum output, which at launch had been 53 hp (39 kW), increased to 59 hp (43 kW), though there was a marginal reduction in maximum torque.

Following the demise of the 204 the new 1127 cc engine found its way into a version of the Peugeot 304 estate: the smaller engine enjoyed substantial tax benefits in the home market when compared to the 1290 cc engines fitted to most 304s.

For certain export markets engine compression ratios and power on the petrol engines were reduced in order to accommodate lower octane fuels.

Towards the end of 1968 a 1255 cc diesel engine option became available for the 204 estate and fourgonette (van) versions. At the time, this is thought to have been the smallest diesel engine fitted in a commercially available car anywhere in the world. In April 1973 the diesel unit was increased in size to 1357 cc, and in September 1975 this diesel unit finally became an option on the 204 saloon. Fuel economy on the 204 Diesel was startlingly good for the era, with overall fuel consumption of 5.7 L/100 km (50 mpg_{‑imp}; 41 mpg_{‑US}). Performance was correspondingly underwhelming with a claimed top speed of 130 km/h (81 mph). Out of the approximately 150,000 diesel 204s produced, fewer than 30,000 were saloons. Until the early 1980s when Volkswagen started heavy promotion of their diesel-engined Golf/Rabbit, cars too small to be used as taxis were generally not offered with diesel engines to European customers.

== Layout and running gear ==
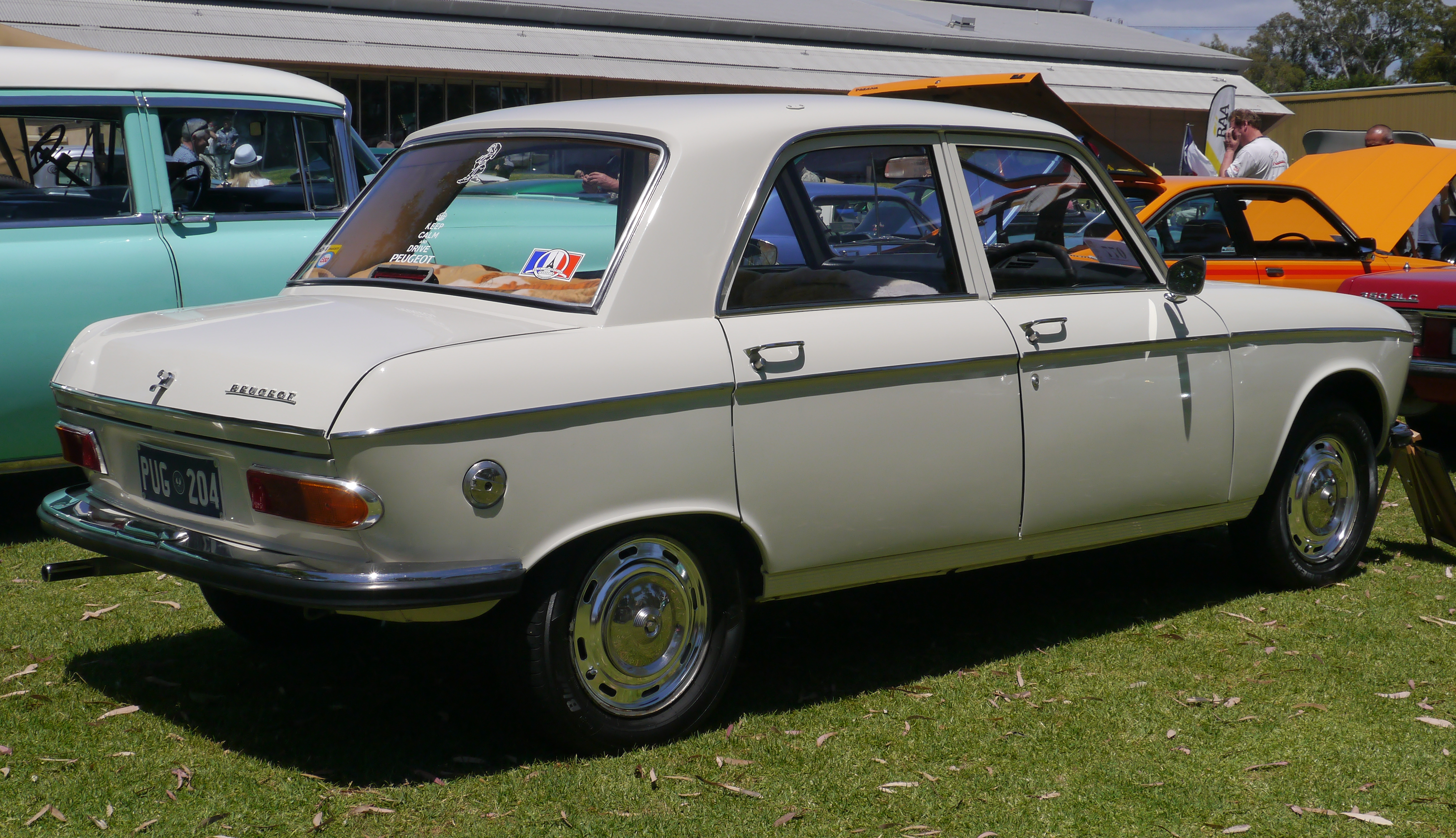
Peugeot 204 Berline

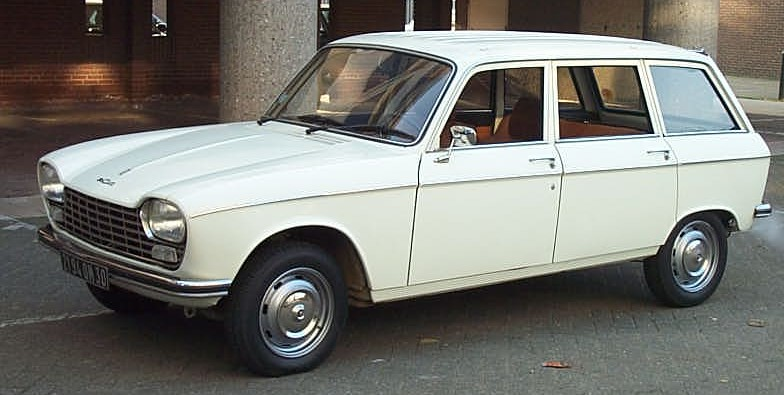
Peugeot 204 Break

204 engines were aluminium and transversely mounted which increased available passenger space within a given wheelbase: the 204 was the first production Peugeot to feature this format which later would become normal for small and mid-sized front-wheel-drive European passenger cars.

The engine had a distinctive design; the gearbox and differential were located directly below the engine block. The fan belt had to make a 90 degree corner in order to reach the radiator fan which was in front of the engine. This transverse design helped Peugeot produce its first front-wheel-drive car.

The 204 was also the first Peugeot to be equipped with disc brakes, albeit only on the front wheels.

The car proved to have good handling, decent performance, and excellent fuel economy.

== The body ==
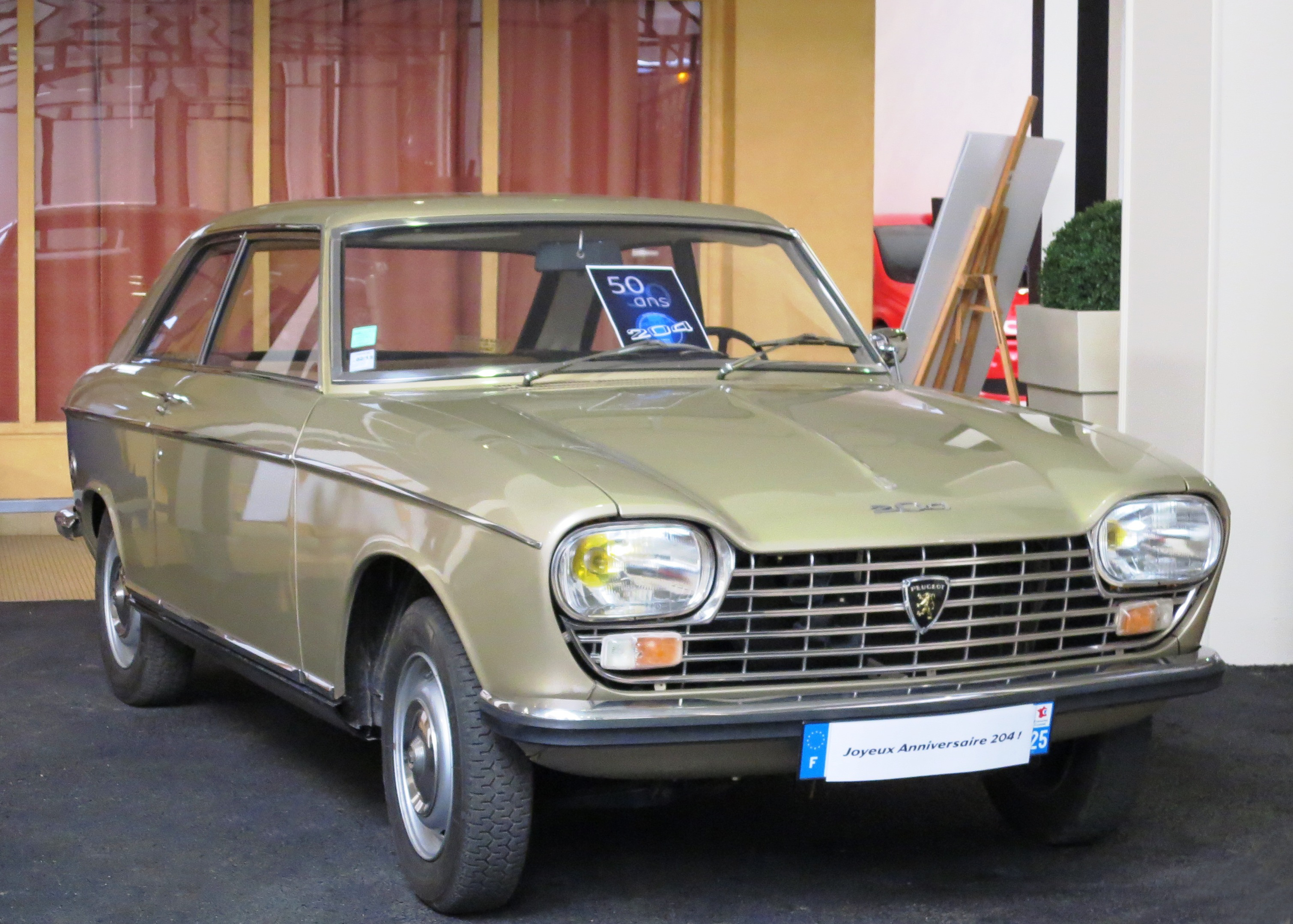
Peugeot 204 Coupé

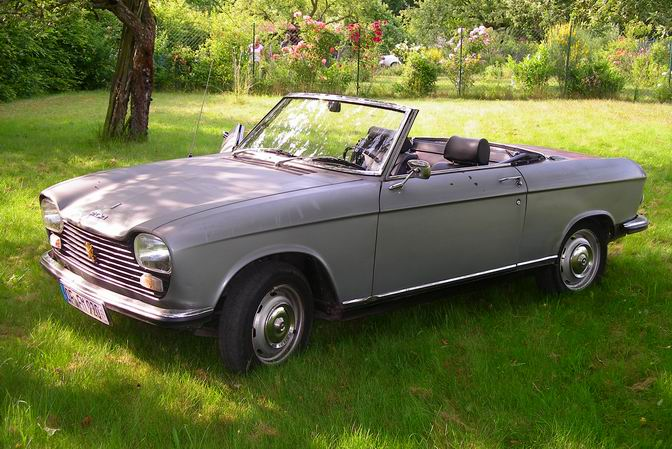
Peugeot 204 Cabriolet

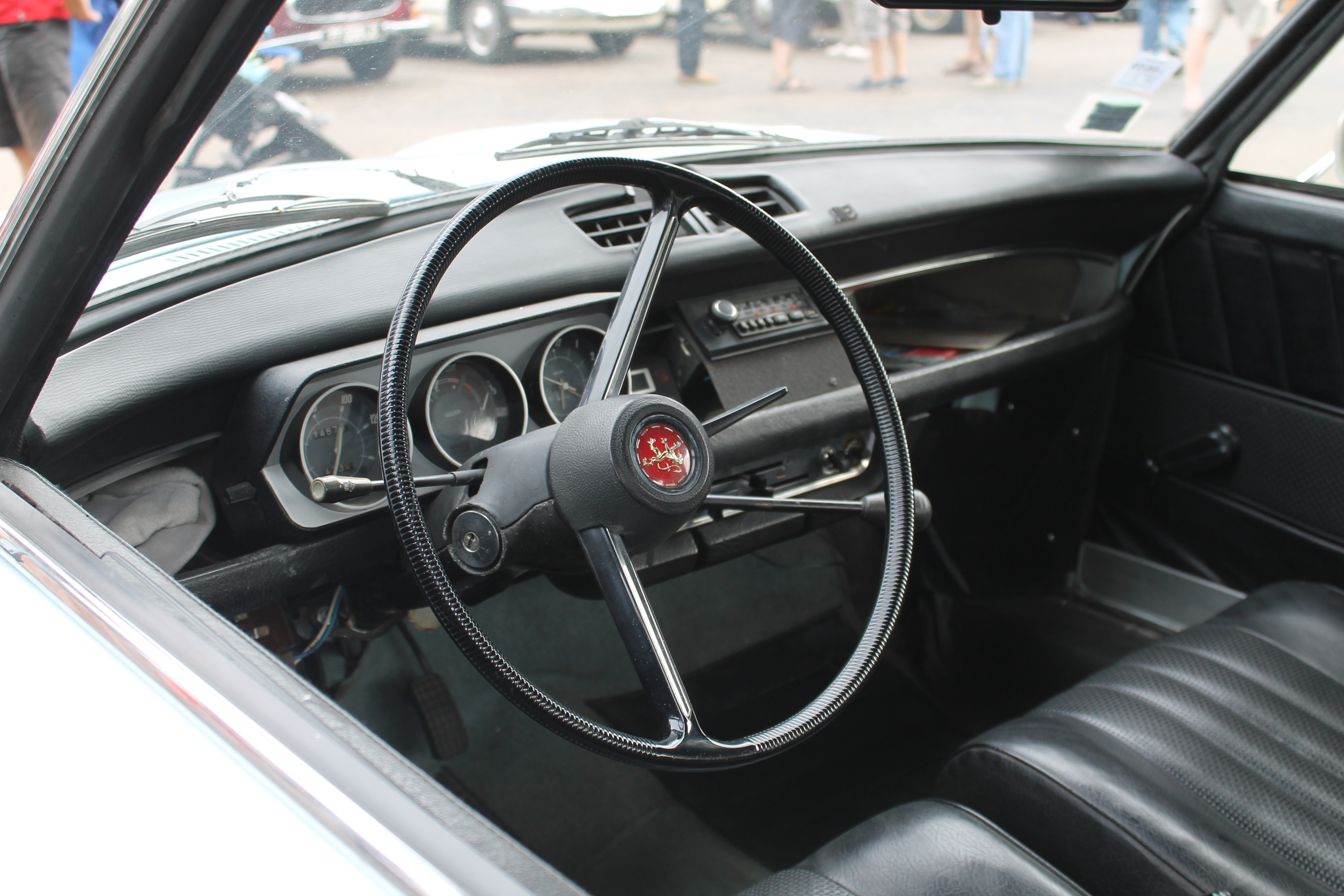
Peugeot 204 Cabriolet interior

The compact transverse-mounted engine combined with a body wider than the class average provided a level of interior space comparable to that of larger cars such as Peugeot's own 404: both cars were Pininfarina designs. The 204 featured neither the fins of the 404 nor the sharp corners characteristic of the other major French launch of 1965, the Renault 16. The resulting less aggressive look has been seen as a 'more European' moving away from a tendency to follow US styling trends that had been apparent in new car launches during the preceding two decades. The Peugeot 204's frontal styling owes much to the 1961 Cadillac Jacqueline by Pininfarina, whilst its rear and that of the prototype Pininfarina styled Mini-based MG ADO 34 of 1964 are strikingly similar. The rear end of the 1970–1974 Lancia Flavia Pininfarina Coupé displays the same influence.

The options list was not extensive but, as with the larger Peugeot saloons, it was possible to specify a sliding steel panel sunroof.

At launch only the four-door saloon version was offered, but the five-door 'break' station wagon (estate) came along less than six months later in the autumn of 1965. 1966 saw the arrival of a two-door cabriolet and a three-door hatchback, marketed as a coupé. Both employed a shortened chassis and were priced only 20% above the level of the (admittedly not particularly aggressively priced) saloon.
The range was completed in 1966 with the arrival of the 'fourgonnette' van version which in most respects followed the design of the estate, but with only one door on each side and a steel panel in place of the side windows behind the b pillar.

Autumn 1969 saw the launch of the Peugeot 304 which was essentially a 204 with a slightly larger engine, a restyled front end and, in the case of the saloon version, a substantially increased rear overhang allowing greater luggage space. The 204 range was correspondingly pruned: the 204 coupé and cabriolet received the dashboard of the new 304 in 1969 only to be withdrawn in 1970, replaced by similarly bodied 304 equivalents. The estate and fourgonnette continued to be offered, along with the saloon, until the 204 range was withdrawn in 1976.

Although the model run lasted more than a decade, the Peugeot 204 changed very little during that time: very early saloons/berlines had a split rear bumper with numberplate set between the two-halves, a flat rear panel and small oval tail lights. For 1975, the stainless steel front grille was replaced by a black plastic grille of the same overall shape. The gearshift for RHD UK cars was moved from the steering column to the floor.

This car's body was one of the first to be shaped using spline curves, and was the first full application of Bézier curves as implemented by Bézier's UNISURF software.

== Anglophone press reaction ==
In Great Britain, a Peugeot 204 saloon tested by Britain's Autocar magazine in September 1966 had a top speed of 86 mph (138 km/h) and could accelerate from 0-60 mph (97 km/h) in 22 seconds. An overall fuel consumption of 32.0 mpg_{‑imp} (8.8 L/100 km; 26.6 mpg_{‑US}) was achieved. The test car was priced by Peugeot in Britain at £903 including taxes: a British competitor, the Triumph 1300 was retailing for £835. The British domestic auto market still enjoyed significant tariff protection at this time. The journal commended the car for lively performance, positive accurate steering, fade free brakes, good fuel economy and light controls. Finish and equipment were described as 'austere and disappointing in relation to price', however.

Britain's MOTOR Magazine tested one of the rare 3-door 204 Coupé models on 12 October 1968. In this case they found that the car would reach 87 mph (140 km/h) on the MIRA banked circuit, with 90 mph (140 km/h) being possible on flatter roads. 0–60 mph (0–97 km/h) was run in 17.3 seconds. Overall fuel consumption was 30.2 mpg_{‑imp} (9.4 L/100 km; 25.1 mpg_{‑US}). The price including all taxes was £1299. The car impressed the testers, despite its price, swollen by import taxes.

== Commercial ==
When Peugeot 204 was launched in 1965, its competitors in French market were Renault 10 and the Simca 1300. Both were rear-wheel-drive while Renault was rear-engined. Citroën did not have any model in similar size to Peugeot 204, slotting in between its smaller Ami and larger DS until the introduction of GS in 1970. The Panhard 24, from Citroën's niche sub-brand, was built in a very small volume, too small to be a serious competitor for Peugeot 204.

The 204 represented a startling change for Peugeot when it was launched, joining the newly emerging trend of adopting the transverse-mounted engine and front-wheel-drive system for the mid-sized saloons rather than continue with rear-wheel-drive system. The BMC ADO16 (introduced in 1963) and Fiat-developed Autobianchi Primula (1964) had largely played the role in that direction. 204 was the same length as Renault 10 but 20 cm shorter than Simca 1300. The space utilisation and package advantage found in 204 forced Renault and Simca to switch to front-wheel-drive when updating their mid-sized cars (Renault 12 in 1970 and Simca 1100 in 1967).

The numerous press leaks following up to the official introduction led to the enthusiastic orders sight unseen of 5,000. The sales success of 204 pushed Peugeot from its fourth place to the second place in the French sales charts, overtaking Citroën and Simca in the process. Along with introduction of Peugeot 304 in 1969, Peugeot has redefined the domestic market for small and medium-sized saloons. 72 percent of the 204s built were delivered in France with West Germany being the next largest export market. In Africa, 204 didn't achieve the popularity of the larger, sturdier 404 and its successor, the 504. The sales success of 204 and 304 helped Peugeot with profitability and gave Peugeot the means to absorb Citroën and Simca into its conglomerate when those companies suffered from the financial collapse of the 1970s.

When the 204 production ended in 1976, it had no direct replacement and its position was filled in by the 304, along with its successor, the 305 (introduced in 1977). In 1982 the 205 was launched as "204 successor" in market position and size, though the 205 was a smaller, hatchback car more akin to the earlier 104.

=== Competition ===
Operating somewhat in the shadow of the victorious 404 and 504, the 204 did not have an extensive competition history. It was campaigned with a measure of success, however, such as at the 1966 East African Safari Rally. Out of six cars entered, the 204s all finished and took the first six positions in the 1,101–1,300 cc class. The 204 also took part in the 1971 Tour de France, where it finished in 49th place in the 3GT class.

In June 1973, the Peugeot 204 Proto Diesel set eight endurance speed records in Category A3, Group 3. The record beating runs took place at the autodrome de Linas-Montlhéry, using drivers including Jean Todt and Hannu Mikkola.

== Data ==
Technical data Peugeot 204 (Manufacturer's figures except where stated)
Peugeot 204	4-door saloon	5-door estate	3-door hatch coupé	2-door cabriolet	3-door fourgonnette (van)
Produced: (units)	Apr 1965 – Jul 1976 (1,020,029)	Sep 1965 – Jul 1976 (485,336)	Oct 1966 – Mar 1970 (42,756)	Oct 1966 – Mar 1970 (18,181)	Oct 1966 – Jun 1976 (37,994)
Engine:	Four-stroke sohc 4-cylinder motor, transversely mounted. Aluminium block with replaceable wetliners				
Displacement: Petrol engines	1130 cc (1965–1975); 1127 cc (1975–1976)	1130 cc (1965–1975); 1127 cc (1975–1976)	1130 cc	1130 cc	1130 cc (1966–1975); 1127 cc (1975–1976)
Displacement: Diesel engines	1357 cc (1975–1976)	1255 cc (1968–1973); 1357 cc (1973–1976)			1357 cc (1973–1976)
Max. Power hp (kW) DIN: Petrol engines	53 hp (39 kW) (1965–1969); 55 hp (40 kW) (1969–1975); 59 hp (43 kW) (1975–1976)	53 hp (39 kW) (1965–1969); 55 hp (40 kW) (1969–1975); 59 hp (43 kW) (1975–1976)	53 hp (39 kW) (1966–1969); 55 hp (40 kW) (1969–1970)	53 hp (39 kW) (1966–1969); 55 hp (40 kW) (1969–1970)	53 hp (39 kW) (1966–1969); 55 hp (40 kW) (1969–1975); 59 hp (43 kW) (1975–1976)
Max. Power hp (kW) DIN : Diesel engines	45 hp (33 kW) (1975–1976)	40 hp (29 kW) (1968–1973); 45 hp (33 kW) (1973–1976)			45 hp (33 kW) (1973–1976)
Max. Torque: Petrol engines	81.8 N⋅m (60.3 lb⋅ft) (1965–1969); 82.6 N⋅m (60.9 lb⋅ft) (1969–1975); 80.4 N⋅m (59.3 lb⋅ft) (1975–1976)	81.8 N⋅m (60.3 lb⋅ft) (1965–1969); 82.6 N⋅m (60.9 lb⋅ft) (1969–1975); 80.4 N⋅m (59.3 lb⋅ft) (1975–1976)	81.8 N⋅m (60.3 lb⋅ft) (1966–1969); 82.6 N⋅m (60.9 lb⋅ft) (1969–1970)	81.8 N⋅m (60.3 lb⋅ft) (1966–1969); 82.6 N⋅m (60.9 lb⋅ft) (1969–1970)	81.8 N⋅m (60.3 lb⋅ft) (1966–1969); 82.6 N⋅m (60.9 lb⋅ft) (1969–1975); 80.4 N⋅m (59.3 lb⋅ft) (1975–1976)
Max. Torque: Diesel engines	77.0 N⋅m (56.8 lb⋅ft) (1975–1976)	65.7 N⋅m (48.5 lb⋅ft) (1968–1973); 77.0 N⋅m (56.8 lb⋅ft) (1973–1976)			77.0 N⋅m (56.8 lb⋅ft) (1973–1976)
Transmission:	Four-speed manual:all forward ratios with synchromesh. Column-mounted gear shift (floor-mounted shift for right-hand-drive markets from 1969). Front-wheel drive				
Brakes:	Front discs: Rear drums				
(Body type)	(4-door saloon)	(5-door estate)	(3-door hatch coupé)	(2-door cabriolet)	(3-door fourgonnette)
Track front/ rear:	1,320 mm (52 in) 1,260 mm (50 in)	1,320 mm (52 in) 1,260 mm (50 in)	1,320 mm (52 in) 1,260 mm (50 in)	1,320 mm (52 in) 1,260 mm (50 in)	1,320 mm (52 in) 1,260 mm (50 in)
Wheelbase:	2,595 mm (102.2 in)	2,590 mm (102 in)	2,305 mm (90.7 in)	2,305 mm (90.7 in)	2,590 mm (102 in)
Length:	3,990 mm (157 in)	3,970 mm (156 in)	3,735 mm (147.0 in)	3,735 mm (147.0 in)	3,970 mm (156 in)
Width:	1,560 mm (61 in)	1,560 mm (61 in)	1,560 mm (61 in)	1,560 mm (61 in)	1,560 mm (61 in)
Height empty/ loaded:	1,400 mm (55 in) 1,340 mm (53 in)	1,400 mm (55 in) 1,340 mm (53 in)	1,300 mm (51 in) 1,280 mm (50 in)	1,320 mm (52 in) 1,300 mm (51 in)	1,400 mm (55 in) 1,340 mm (53 in)
