= Bulgarrenault =

Automobile produced in Plovdiv, Bulgaria

Bulgarrenault (or Bulgar Renault) was an joint venture produced in the city of Plovdiv, Bulgaria, and the result of a collaboration between Metalhim (a Bulgarian defence firm) and Bulet (a Bulgarian export trade organisation). Production lasted for six years (1966–1972), during which the factory in Plovdiv produced two Renault models: the Renault 8 and the Renault 10.

== Beginnings ==
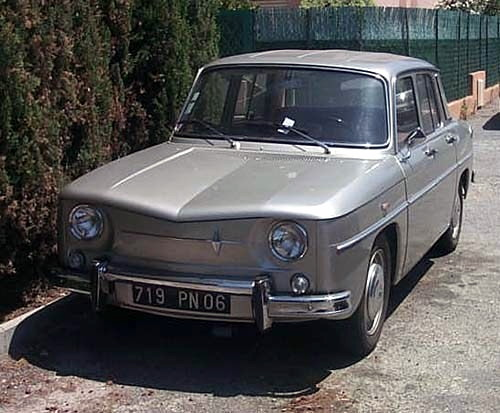
Bulgarrenault 8

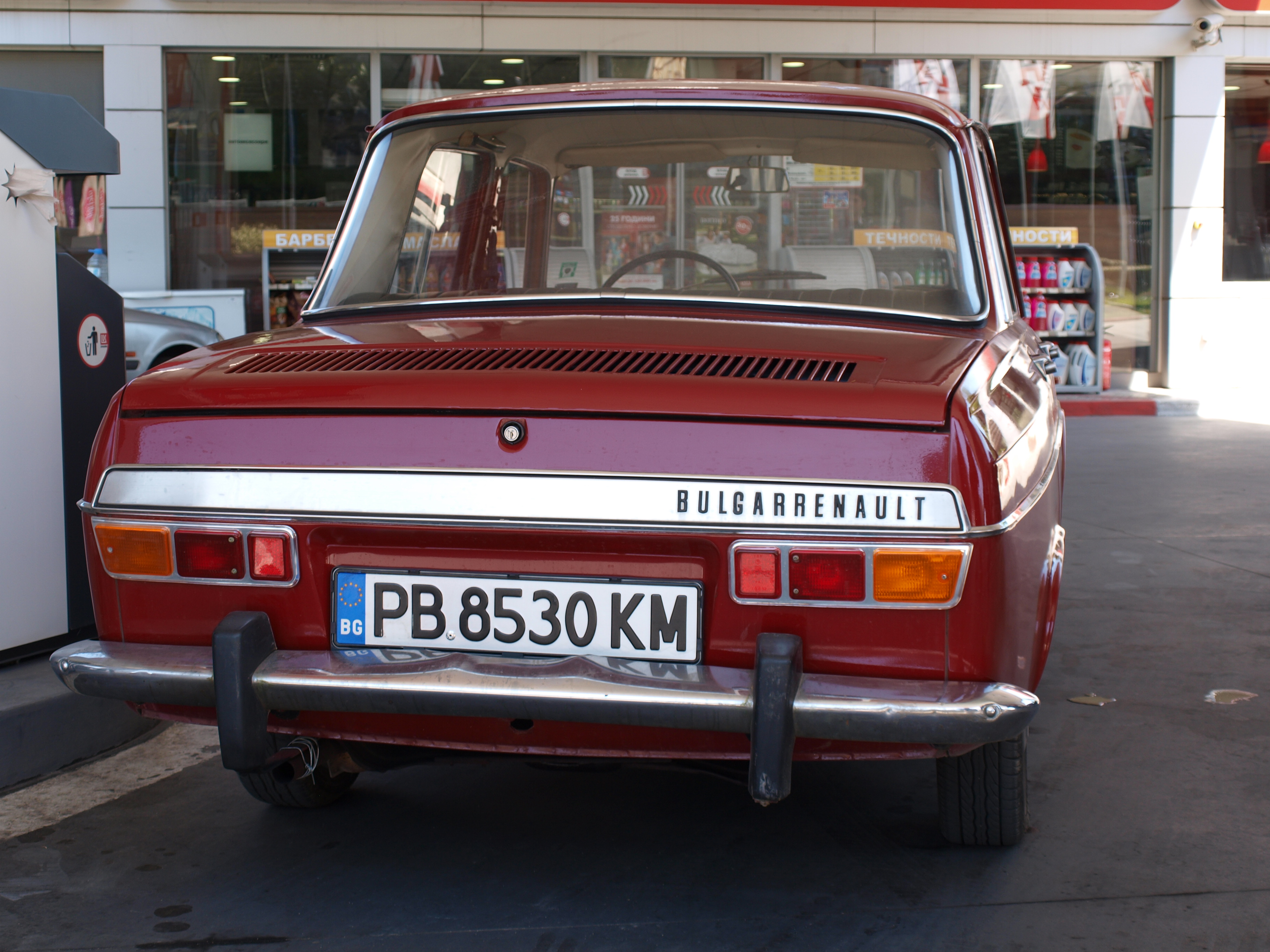
Bulgarrenault 10

In the middle of the 1960s, following the initiative of ETO (export trade organisation) Bulet, a joint-venture was formed between Bulet and SPC (state production cooperative) Metalhim, with the purpose of building passenger cars. At the time, ETO Bulet was involved in the trade of all kinds of manufactured goods, while SPC Metalhim was a manufacturing cooperative uniting all national defence factories in Bulgaria. The basic idea was to purchase complete knock down (CKD) kits of passenger cars from abroad with Bulet's available hard-currency reserves, and then to assemble them in the factories owned by Metalhim. Several offers had already been made by foreign car manufacturers (such as Renault, Fiat, Simca, and Alfa Romeo), but Renault's offer was deemed to be the most attractive one. (The French automobile manufacturer's first offer was made on May 27, 1963, concerning the assembly of the Renault 4 and Renault 4L passenger cars.)

On July 30, 1966, the Council of Ministers issued a formal authorisation to SPC Metalhim to begin negotiations with Renault through the mediation of ETO Bulet. (Initially, the assembly of the cars was intended for a factory in the town of Cherven Bryag).

The official state newspaper Rabotnichesko Delo in its issue #261 of September 18, 1966, announced that ETO Bulet and Renault had signed a contract, and only two days later 10 passengers cars Renault 8 were shown at the Plovdiv Fair, rumoured to have been assembled in the Military Factory in the town of Kazanlak. The cars were branded Bulgarrenault, and the upper left side of their windshield bore a tricolor sticker with an inscription Bulet.

Rabotnichesko Delo's issue of September 21, 1966, contained a quote from a senior manager at Renault regarding the just-signed contract with ETO Bulet, which planned that over 10,000 passengers cars model Renault 8 would be assembled in Bulgaria in 1970.

== Production start ==
The project leaders of the establishment of the Renault assembly works in Bulgaria were the French engineer Pierre Auberger, and the managing directors of ETO Bulet Emil Razlogov and of SPC Metalhim gen. Yamakov. Stefan Vaptsarov became the technical leader, while Atanas Taskov and Georgi Mladenov were named as heads of the export of passengers cars at ETO Bulet. A group of Bulgarian engineers was concurrently assigned to undergo a three-month-long training at Renault's factories in France.

Initially, France provided all necessary parts and components of the cars, but the plan was to gradually switch to a progressive assembly, which would eventually lead to the great majority of them being manufactured in Bulgaria.

In 1967, the assembly line was moved to the city of Plovdiv, where the construction of the new car-assembly factory had just been completed. Until the formal dedication of the factory, the assembly temporarily took place in Hall #10 of the Plovdiv Fairgrounds.

The new factory functioned until 1970 and, in addition to its fully automated moving assembly line, it included modern welding and painting machinery as well, the latter obtained at a cost of US$15 million.

== Production increase and end ==
In 1967, Bulgaria exported 16,000 accessory kits to France, while in 1968 their number was slated to increase to 100,000. The annual production of the car assembly plant was intended to reach 3,000 passenger cars, but that ambitious goal was never reached. Until 1970, the Plovdiv factory produced approximately 4,000 cars model Bulgarrenault 8 and 10, at a total cost of the French-supplied parts and components of the equivalent of US$6 million, averaging the equivalent of US$1 500 per production car. The first production cars were marketed in Bulgaria in February 1967, which was officially announced in issue #2 of the car enthusiast magazine Avto-Moto. The magazine mentioned a price of 5,500 Bulgarian leva per car, but the actual prices were fixed at 6,100 leva for the Bulgarrenault 8 and 6,800 leva for the Bulgarrenault 10.

A certain part of the newly assembled cars were sold abroad as well; during 1967–1969, 500 Bulgarrenault 10 cars were exported to Yugoslavia, and in 1970 another 300 (some sources mention 900) Bulgarrenault 8 and 10 cars were exported to Austria. Other purchasers of Bulgarrenault included some Middle Eastern countries.

All production of the Bulgarrenault passenger cars stopped in early 1972.

== Production numbers ==
Modèles	1966	1967	1968	1969	1970	1971	TOTAL
Renault 8 & 10	50	870	1600	2486	967	567	6540

== Export numbers ==
- 1968: 522
- 1969: 789
- 1970: 462
- total exports: 1773

== See also ==
- MAVA-Renault
- Oyak-Renault
- Oltcit
