= Panhard Dynavia =

Dynavia
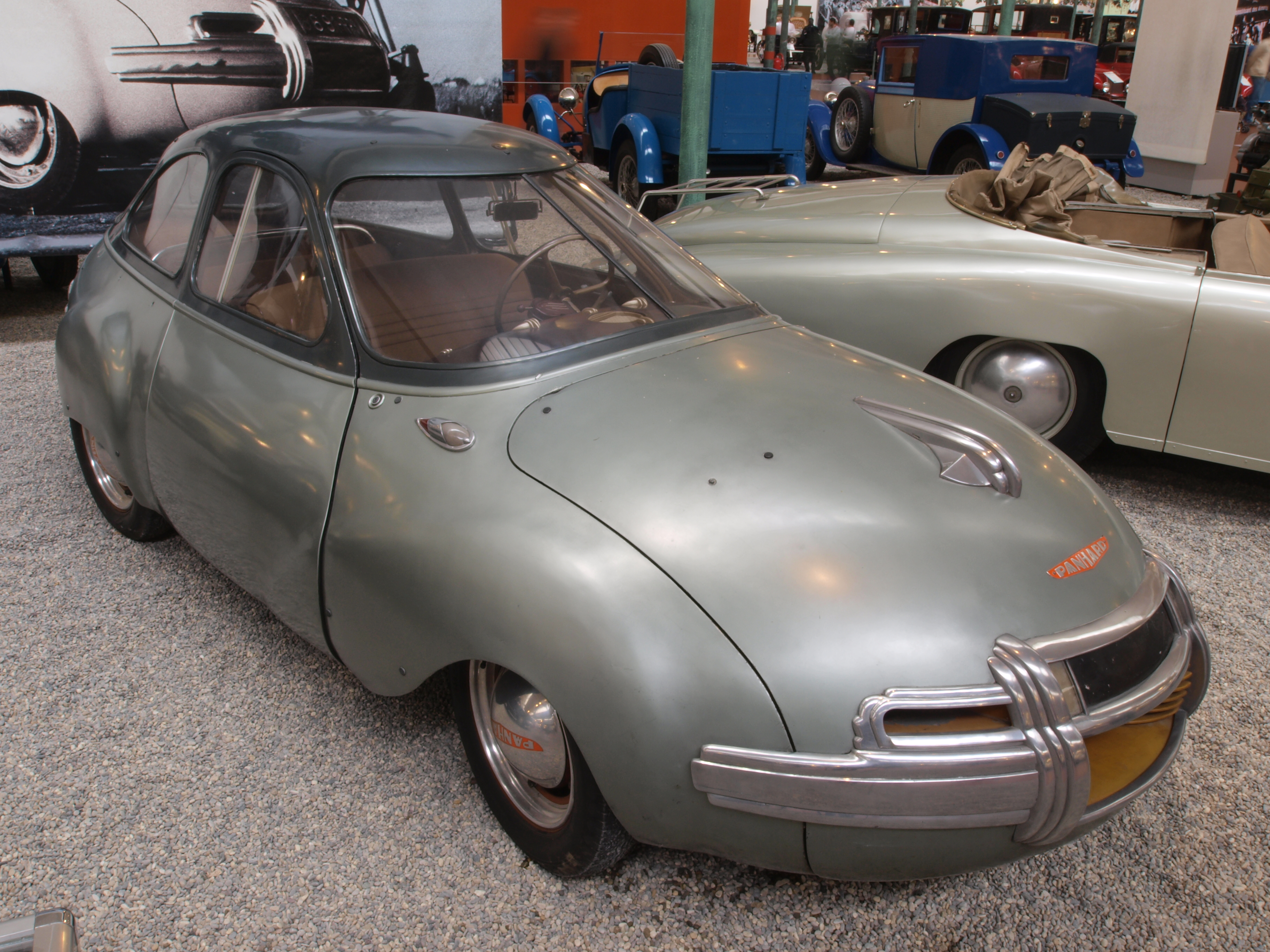
- 1948 Panhard Dynavia

Overview
- Manufacturer: Panhard
- Assembly: France
- Designer: Louis Bionier

Body and chassis
- Body style: 2 door
- Layout: Front-engine, front-wheel drive
- Platform: Dyna X

Powertrain
- Engine: 610 cc (37.2 cu in) air-cooled 2-cylinder boxer
- Transmission: 4-speed manual

Dimensions
- Wheelbase: 2,120 mm (83.5 in)
- Length: 4,400 mm (173.2 in)
- Width: 1,700 mm (66.9 in)
- Height: 1,450 mm (57.1 in)
- Kerb weight: 650 kg (1,433 lb)

Chronology
- Predecessor: none
- Successor: none

The Dynavia is a concept car built by Panhard in 1948 (78 years ago). It was built as an experiment in aerodynamics.

== Post-war developments and conception ==
Before the end of World War II, French automaker Panhard et Levassor foresaw that post-war demand for their typically large and expensive cars would be limited and that a smaller less expensive model would be needed. Designer Louis Bionier began development of a small two-box "voiture populaire" (people's car) that would be powered by engineer Louis Delagarde's new air-cooled two-cylinder boxer engine driving the front wheels.

At the same time, automotive designer Jean-Albert Grégoire was working on a car originally called the "Automobile Légère Grégoire" (ALG) later renamed "Aluminium Français Grégoire" (AFG) when the French national aluminum consortium stepped in to sponsor the project. The resulting prototype was also a small front-wheel drive car powered by an air-cooled two-cylinder boxer engine. The AFG weighed only 400 kg (881.8 lb) due to the use of the aluminum alloy Alpax to produce a unitary-style chassis and the use of aluminum for the bodywork. Grégoire showed the car to several French car makers including Simca but interest was absent.

When the Pons Plan to rationalize the French automotive industry went into effect the company on the Avenue d'Ivry, now simply known as Panhard, was denied permission and access to materials needed to continue building cars. During this time, steel was rationed but aluminum, whose production had been increased during the war, was not. To obtain permission to build small cars under the Pons Plan, Panhard obtained non-exclusive rights to the aluminum-intensive AFG strongly supported by Pons.

Bionier and Delagarde developed a new car called the VP2 that substituted a chassis of two tall narrow steel box members and cross-bracing for the AFG's Alpax unitary unit. The VP2 was a 4-door 4-seat car. The bodywork was still of aluminum and reflected the styling of the AFG, although neither Grégoire nor Bionier were entirely satisfied with it. Panhard may have been pressured to make the VP2 look like the AFG but they never acknowledged any connection between the two cars. Grégoire eventually sued Panhard for unpaid royalties. The VP2 entered production as the Panhard Dyna X.

During the war, Bionier had also pursued his interest in aerodynamics. He observed the shapes and movements of birds and fishes and built scale models of a streamlined 7-passenger car he named the VP6. In 1945, Bionier tested a 1/5 scale model in the wind tunnel at the Institut Aérodynamique in Saint-Cyr.

Following the introduction of the Dyna X, Bionier returned to those early studies and built a concept car to explore how they might be applied to a full-sized vehicle. This car was the Panhard Dynavia.

== Features and performance ==
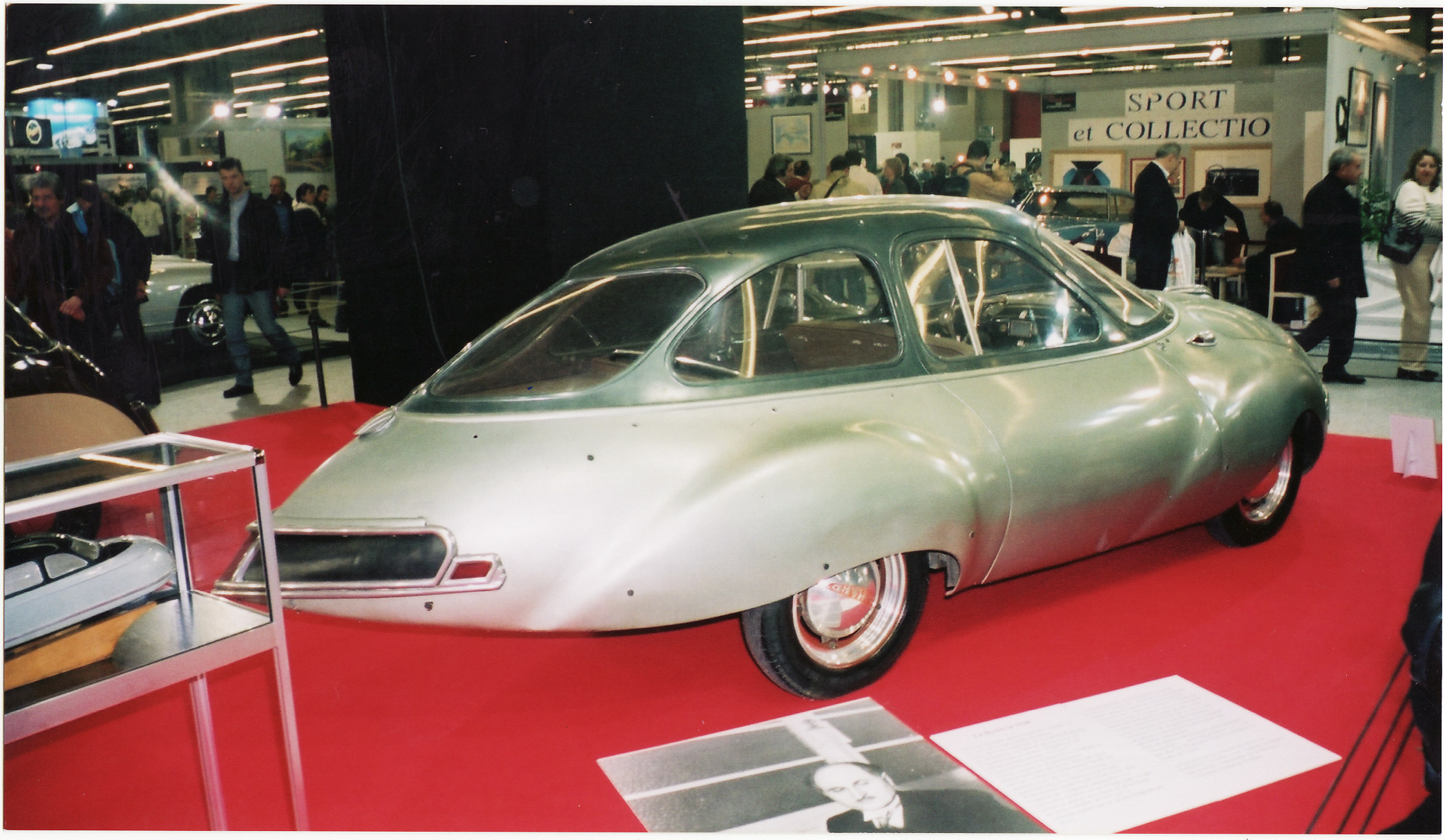
Rear three-quarter view.

The Dynavia was built on the Dyna X chassis. Power came from Panhard's two-cylinder OHV GM600 boxer engine with a bore of 72 mm, a stroke of 75 mm and total displacement of 610 cc (37.2 cu in). The engine was front-mounted and drove the front wheels through a four-speed manual transaxle. Suspension was independent on all four corners. Steering was by rack-and-pinion. Brakes were drums front and rear.

The 2-door bodywork was executed in Duralinox, an aluminum/magnesium alloy. The Dynavia's shape resulted in a drag coefficient ($\scriptstyle C_\mathrm d\,$) of just 0.26. The car was designed to seat four people although the narrow body and curving roof-line limited passenger space. The tall greenhouse with its two-piece windscreen and backlite offered good outward visibility. A single floodlight was mounted in the centre of the nose of the car, while the headlamps were Cibié "zero dazzle" units housed in tubes in the fenders and projecting flat beams out through slots on either side of the nose.

At 650 kg (1,433.0 lb) the Dynavia was heavier than the equivalent Dyna X. Its engine produced 28 hp (20.9 kW) at 4000 rpm which enabled the car to reach a top speed of 131 km/h (81.4 mph). This was about 18 percent faster than the Dyna X with the same drive-train. The Dynavia's fuel consumption has been reported to vary from 3.5 L/100 km (80.7 mpg_{‑imp}) to 5 L/100 km (56.5 mpg_{‑imp}).

== Debut and subsequent history ==
The Dynavia was first shown at the 1948 Paris Auto Salon and was favorably received by both the public and the press. This car remained the property of Panhard and was eventually permanently loaned to the Cité de l'Automobile museum in Mulhouse. It was also displayed at the 2005 Rétromobile show in Paris, France during the week of February 11 to February 20, 2005

A second car was built which was sent to a Panhard dealer in Grenoble. This car was sold to a private owner in Switzerland but was later involved in a crash and was scrapped.

Parts to build a third Dynavia were produced but this car was never assembled.

The favorable impression made by the Dynavia and the benefits of its aerodynamic shape encouraged Paul Panhard to give Bionier approval to design an aerodynamic body for the upcoming Panhard Dyna Z.
