= Panhard K 101 =

Overview
- Type: Medium truck
- Manufacturer: Panhard
- Also called: Panhard K 128
- Production: 1937–1940
- Assembly: Paris, France

Body and chassis
- Body style: COE
- Layout: Front-engine, rear-wheel drive

Powertrain
- Transmission: 4-speed manual

The Panhard K 101 is a forward control truck aimed at military and commercial use produced between 1937 and 1940 by the French manufacturer Panhard.

== History ==
The 3.5-tonne payload K 101 was introduced by Panhard in direct competition with the new forward control AGx range from Renault. The company produced 816 K 101s, of which 491 were delivered to the French military (from 1939 onwards). Between 1939 and 1940 Panhard also produced a gasifier-equipped version known as K 128, as part of a plan by the French army for using gasifiers at the 10% of the vehicles. 31 units were produced. The Panhards K 128 (and the heavier 5-tonne payload K 48) were the only trucks with gasifier delivered to the French military during World War II.

== Technical details ==
The K 101 and K 128 have a length of 6.4 metres (21 feet) and a width of 2.35 metres (8 feet).The K 101 has a 3.17-litre inline-four petrol engine with a maximum power output of 70 PS (51 kW), its maximum speed was 59 kilometres per hour. The K 128 has a 4.48-litre inline-four engine with a maximum power output estimated between 58 PS (43 kW) and 60 PS (44 kW).
