= Châtillon-Panhard =

French all-wheel drive truck

Châtillon-Panhard (K8/K11/13)
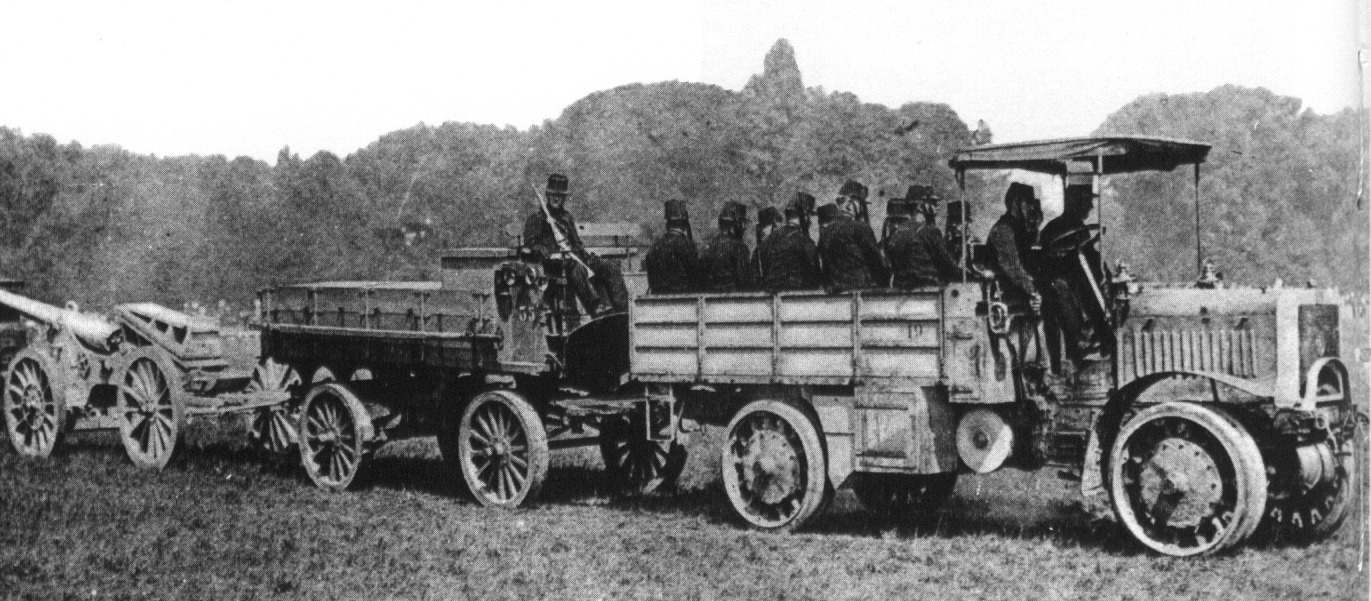
- 1914 version

Overview
- Manufacturer: Société des Anciens Établissements Panhard et Levassor
- Also called: Tracteur Panhard-Châtillon; Panhard K 11; Panhard K 13
- Production: 1911–1919
- Assembly: Paris, France

Body and chassis
- Layout: Front-engine, four-wheel drive

The Châtillon-Panhard (French pronunciation: [tʁaktœʁ panaʁ(d) ʃatijɔ̃] was a conventional-cabin, all-wheel drive truck produced between 1911 and 1918 by the French manufacturer Panhard. It was one of the first all-wheel drive trucks used by the French military.

== History ==
In the early 1910s, after some French government-sponsored trials of new traction systems, a retired French militaryman surnamed DePort, which was the technical advisor of a metallurgical company called Compagnie des Forges de Châtillon-Commentry, decided to develop a new all-wheel drive vehicle. He partnered with the automotive company Société des Anciens Établissements Panhard et Levassor through its then manager Arthur Krebs The new vehicle manufactured by Panhard et Levassor, the Tracteur Panhard-Châtillon (or Châtillon-Panhard), was tested by a French government commission for the first time in 1911. Later, the truck, along with other vehicles designed for difficult terrains, was tested by the French military in 1911, 1912 and 1913. The initial prototype was designated Panhard-Châtillon K8 and was upgraded in 1913 as Panhard-Châtillon K11. At the tests, the Tracteur Panhard-Châtillon achieved good results. At further tests conducted in 1914, however, it failed as the other vehicles, so minor tests were conducted afterwards. The French military requested the assembly of about 50 vehicles. The Panhard-Châtillons were the only hauling transports used by France for its artillery units that were not horse-drawn at the First Battle of the Marne.

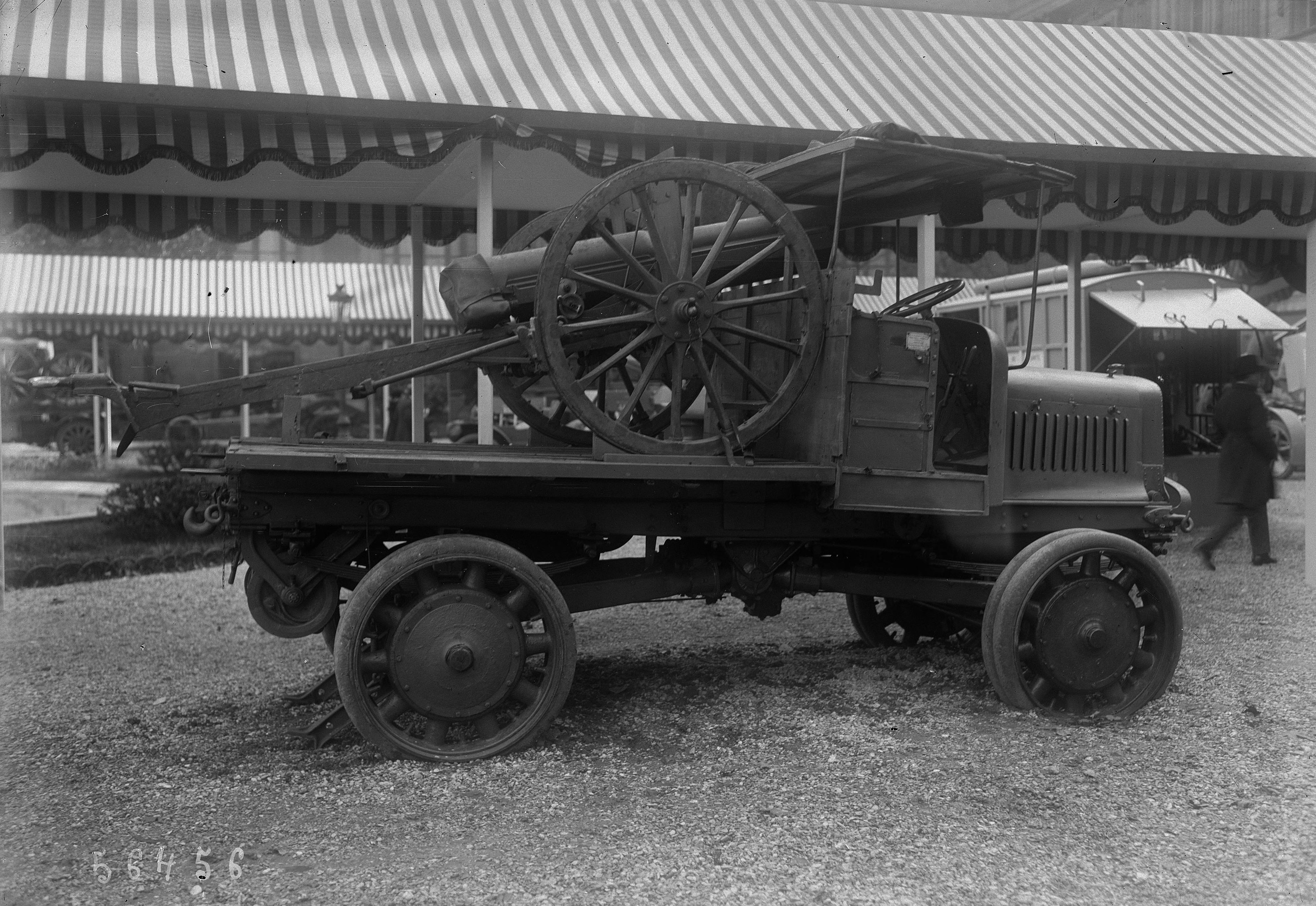
A Panhard K13 carrying a 75 mm gun, 1919.

Around 100 K11s were produced from 1913 to 1915. They were replaced by Latil TARs and Renault EGs and none remain in service by 1918. In 1915, a lighter variant was introduced, the Tracteur Panhard-Châtillon K13 and 690 were produced from September 1915 to November 1919. Some Panhard K13s were still in French Army service, mostly as gun-carriers for the 75 mm gun during the 1940 Battle of France.

== Technical details ==
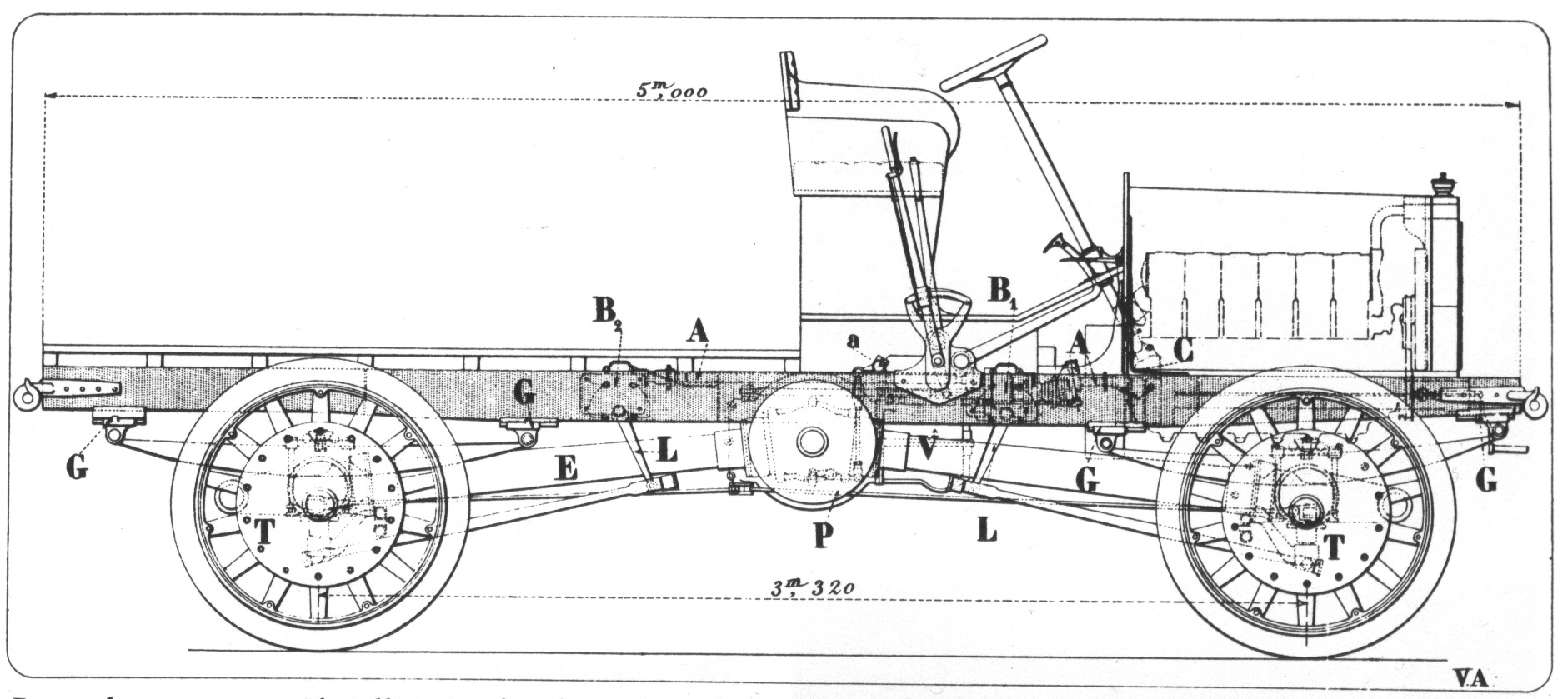
Technical drawing of the 1911 model.

The Châtillon-Panhard had a sleeve-valved 8.8-litre inline-four petrol engine which delivered between 40 metric horsepower (29 kW) and 42 metric horsepower (31 kW). At the early tests, it used a 6.6-litre inline-six engine which delivered 45 metric horsepower (33 kW) at about 1,000 rpm. The truck had no universal joints and it mounted a central differential gear. It had a 3-speed gearbox. The Châtillon-Panhard had a four-wheel steering system by which the parallel wheels were linked, not the wheels on the same axle. This allowed the Châtillon-Panhard closer turning radius that comparable vehicles. The wheels were made of cast steel.

The wheelbase of the truck was 3,320 mm (131 in), the length 4,850 mm (191 in), the width 1,450 mm (57 in) and the height 1,000 mm (39 in) (without the roof). The heavier produced versions had slightly larger dimensions. It had a payload capacity of 2,430 kilograms (5,360 lb) and could haul about 15 tonnes.
