= Panhard =

Former French motor vehicle manufacturer, now part of Arquus

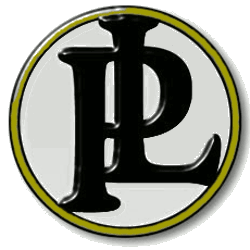
- Industry: Manufacturing
- Founded: 1887; 139 years ago
- Founder: René Panhard, Émile Levassor
- Defunct: 2018
- Successor: Citroën (for civilian vehicle); Renault Trucks Defense (for military vehicles)
- Headquarters: Paris, France
- Products: Cars

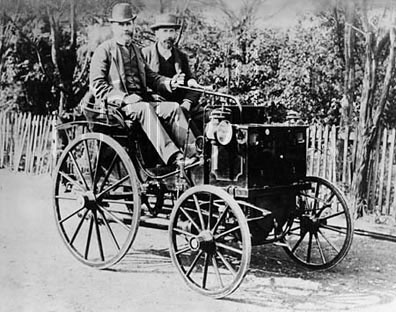
Panhard et Levassor (1887–1895). This model was the first registered automobile in Portugal.

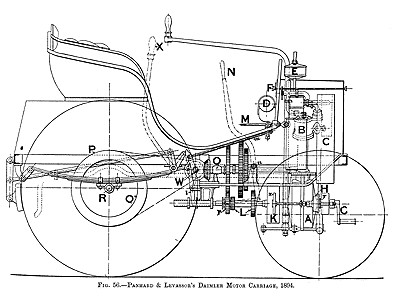
Panhard et Levassor's Daimler Motor Carriage, 1894

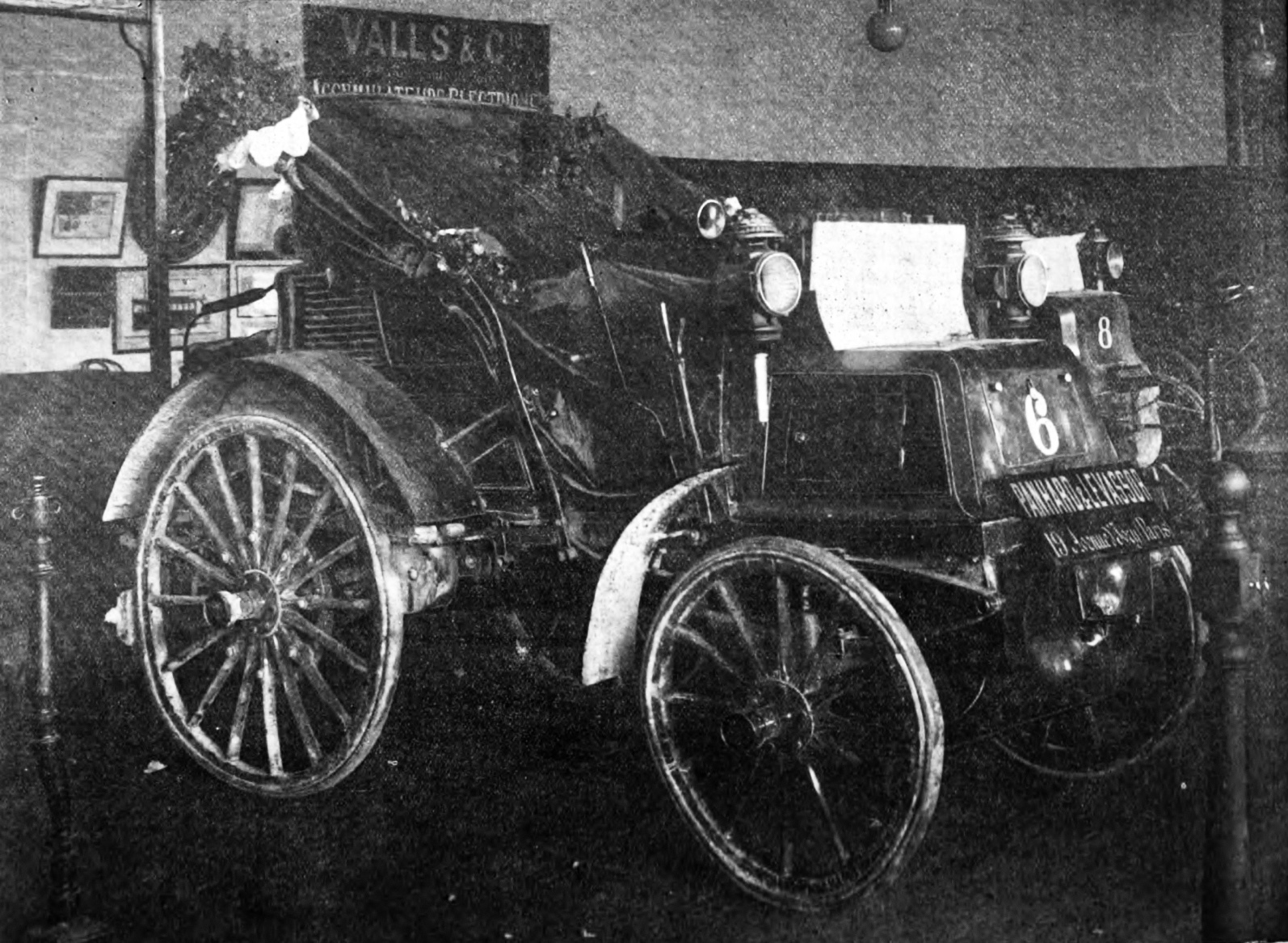
Panhard et Levassor (1896)

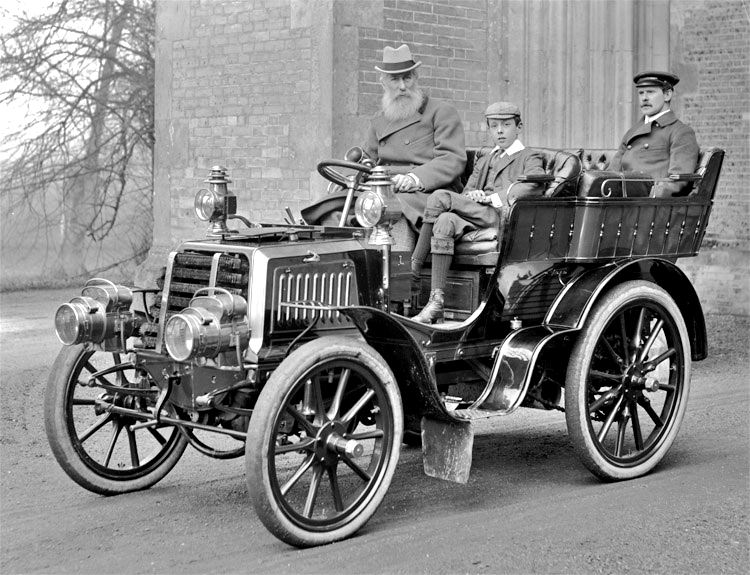
12 h.p. Panhard, ca. 1902

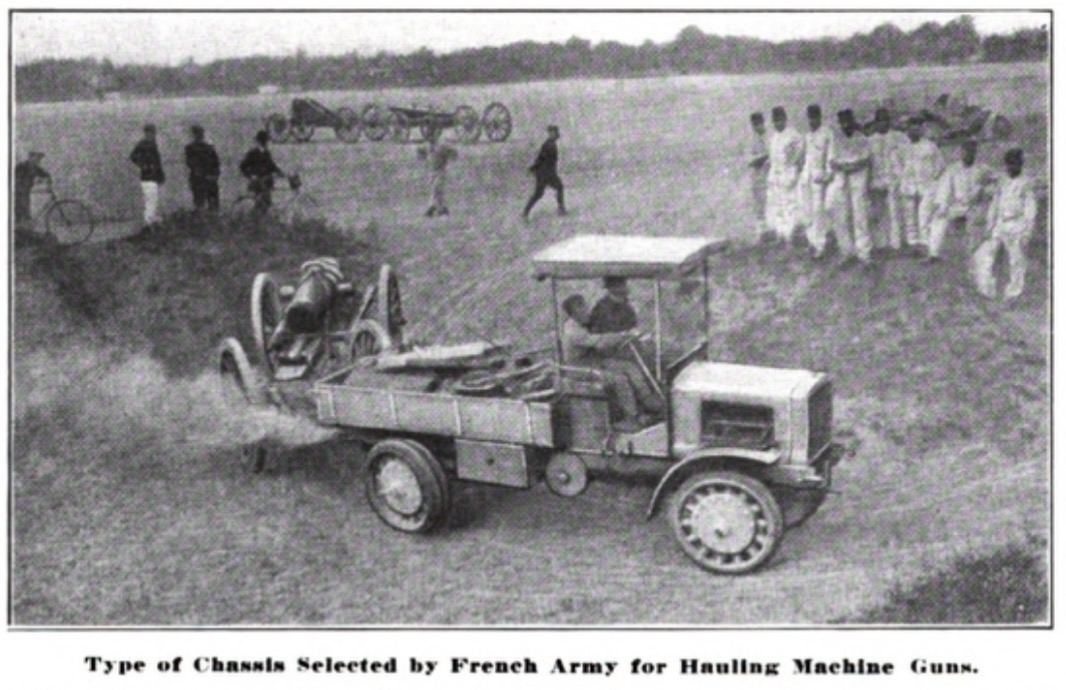
Panhard Chatillon Tractor K8 4x4 Test of the French army in Morocco on suitability as a tractor for cannons (1912)

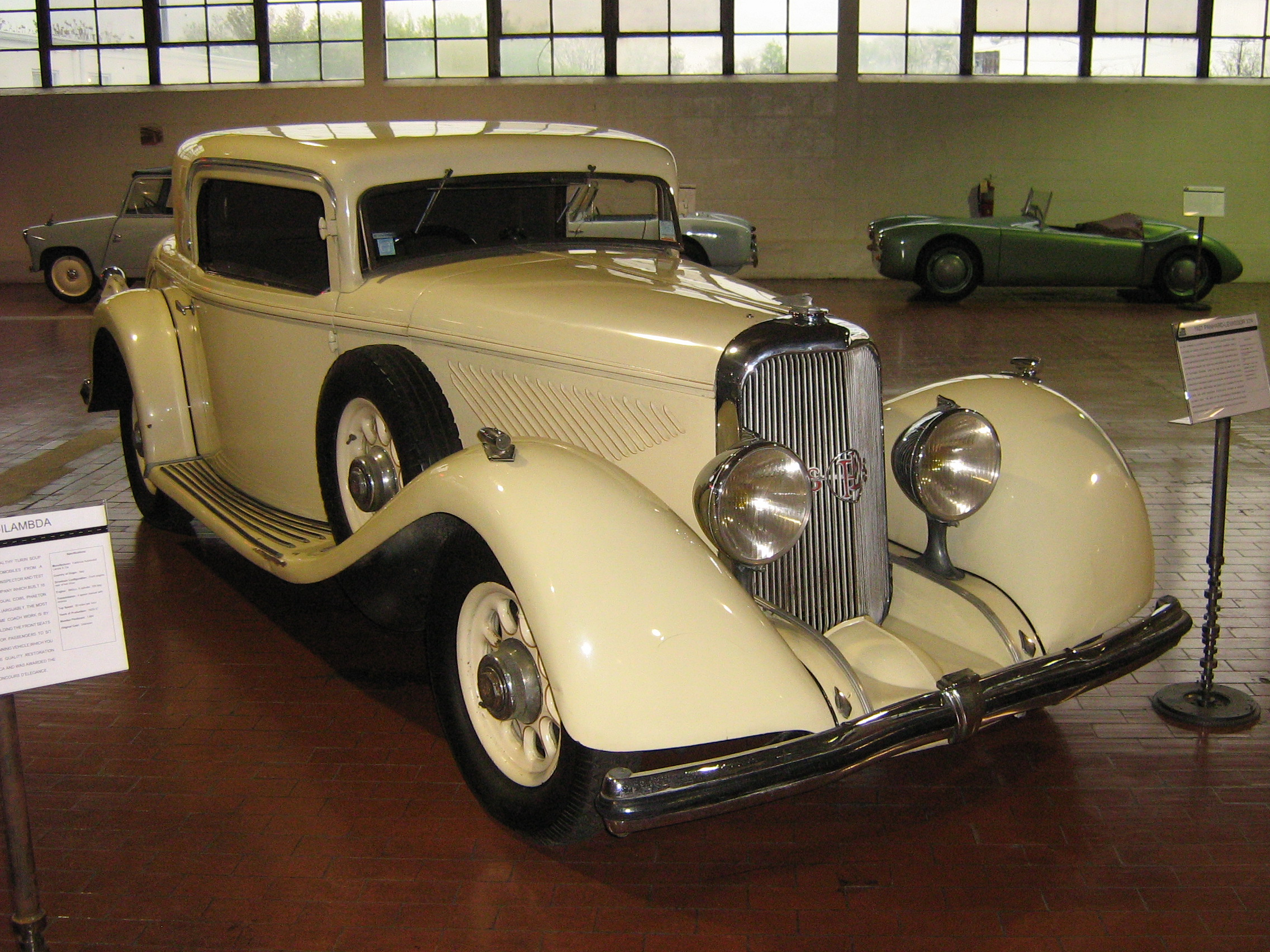
1933 Panhard et Levassor X74

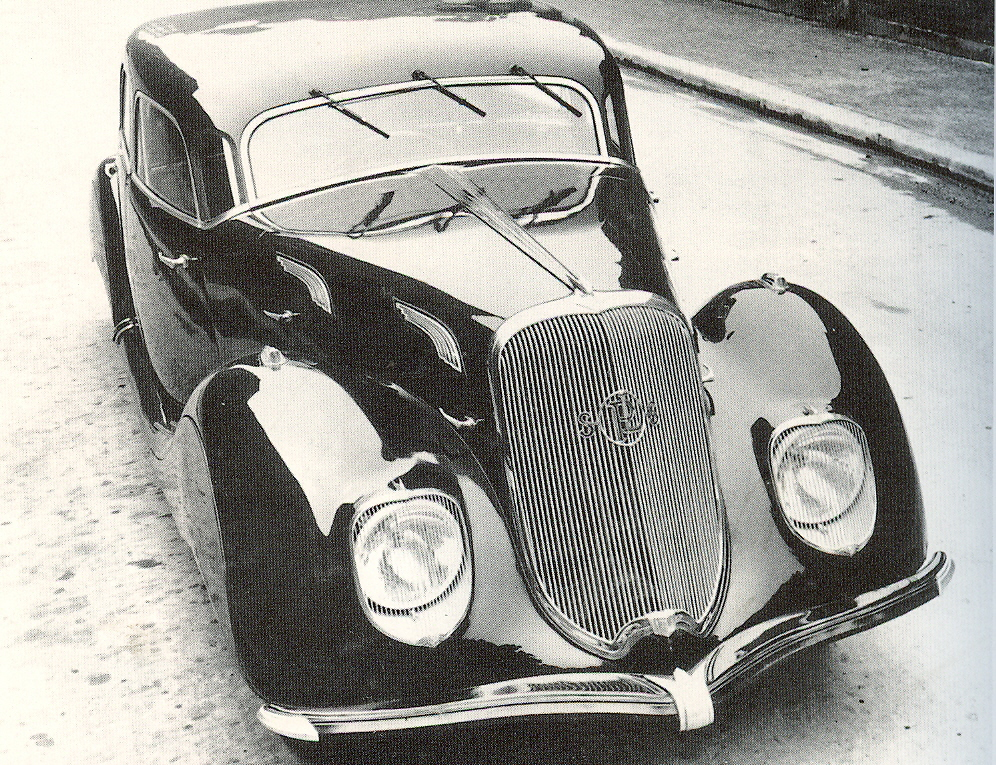
1937 Panhard et Levassor Dynamic

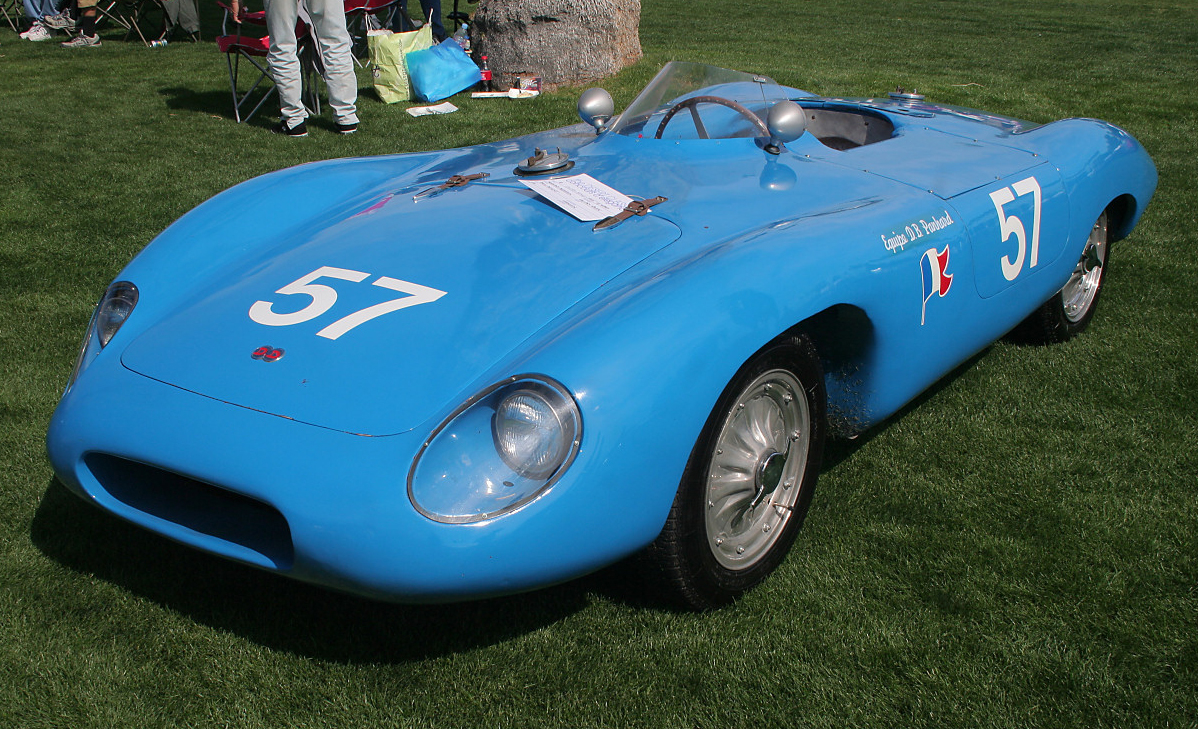
1955 DB Panhard HBR

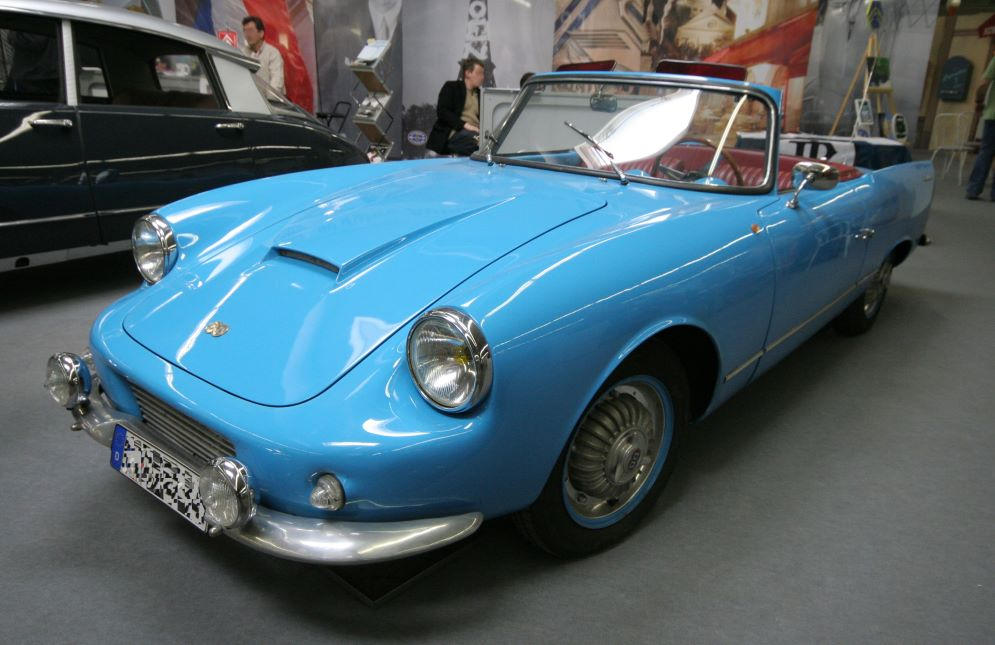
1960 Panhard DB Le Mans

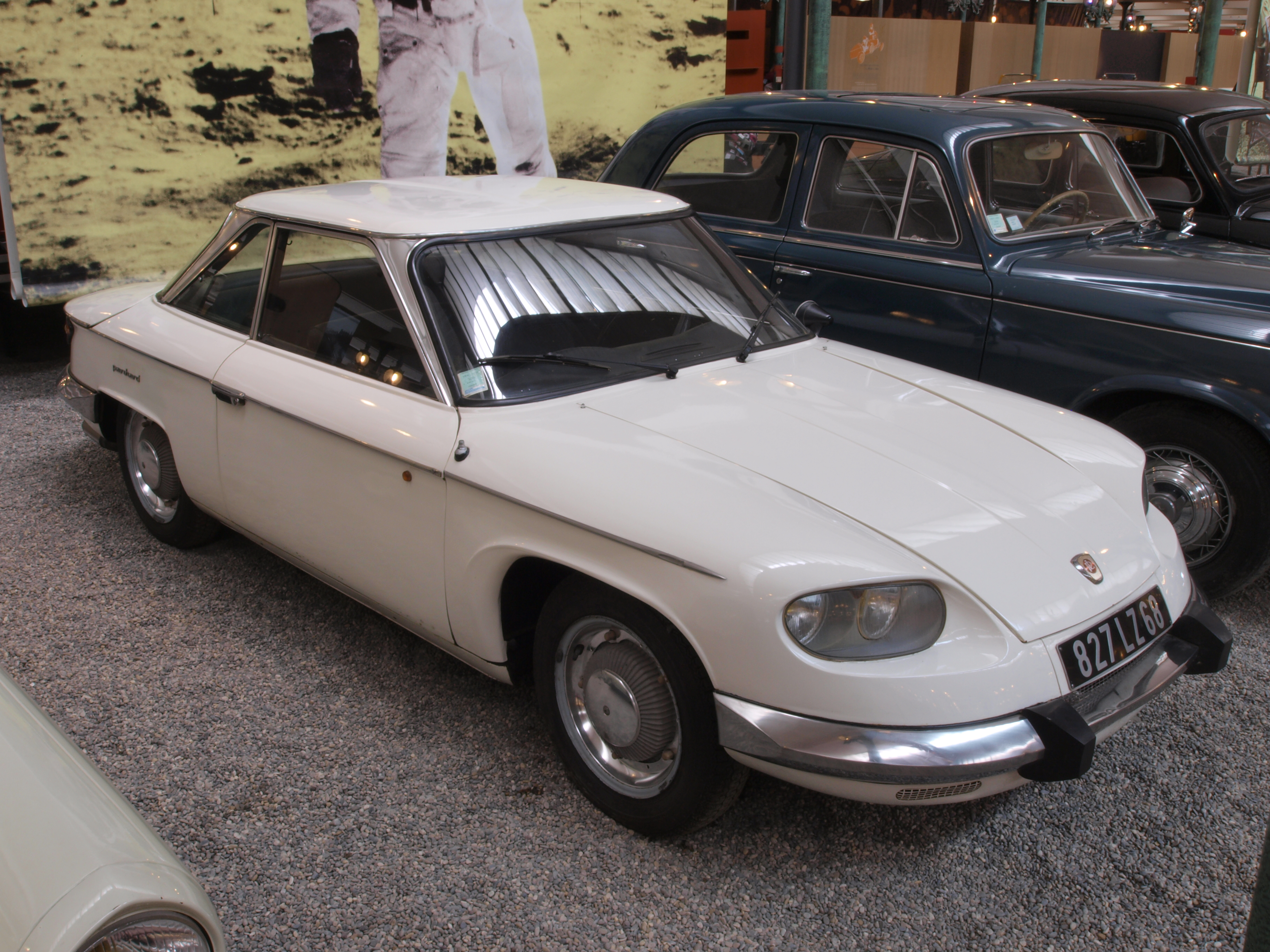
1964 Panhard 24CT

Panhard was a French motor vehicle manufacturer that began as one of the first makers of automobiles. It was a manufacturer of light tactical and military vehicles. Its final incarnation, now owned by Renault Trucks Defense, was formed by the acquisition of Panhard by Auverland in 2005, and then by Renault in 2012. In 2018, Renault Trucks Defense, ACMAT and Panhard combined under a single brand, Arquus.

== History ==
Panhard was originally called Panhard et Levassor, and was established as an automobile manufacturing concern by René Panhard, Émile Levassor, and Belgian lawyer Edouard Sarazin in 1887.

=== Early years ===
Panhard et Levassor sold their first automobile in 1890, based on a Daimler engine license. Levassor obtained his licence from Paris lawyer Edouard Sarazin, a friend and representative of Gottlieb Daimler's interests in France. Following Sarazin's 1887 death, Daimler commissioned Sarazin's widow Louise to carry on her late husband's agency. The Panhard et Levassor license was finalised by Louise, who married Levassor in 1890. Daimler and Levassor became friends, and shared improvements with one another.

These first vehicles set many modern standards, but each was a one-off design. They used a clutch pedal to operate a chain-driven gearbox. The vehicle also featured a front-mounted radiator. An 1895 Panhard et Levassor is credited with the first modern transmission. For the 1894 Paris–Rouen Rally, Alfred Vacheron equipped his 4 hp (3 kW) Panhard with a steering wheel, believed to be one of the earliest employments of the principle.

In 1891, the company built its first all-Levassor design, a "state of the art" model: the Système Panhard consisted of four wheels, a front-mounted engine with rear wheel drive, and a crude sliding-gear transmission, sold at 3500 francs. (It would remain the standard until Cadillac introduced synchromesh in 1928.) This was to become the standard layout for automobiles for most of the next century. The same year, Panhard et Levassor shared their Daimler engine license with bicycle maker Armand Peugeot, who formed his own car company.

In 1895, 1,205 cc (74 cu in) Panhard et Levassor vehicles finished first and second in the Paris–Bordeaux–Paris race, one piloted solo by Levassor, for 48 hours, 45 minutes. However, during the 1896 Paris–Marseille–Paris race, Levassor was fatally injured due to a crash while trying to avoid hitting a dog, and died in Paris the following year. Arthur Krebs succeeded Levassor as General Manager in 1897, and held the job until 1916. He turned the Panhard et Levassor Company into one of the largest and most profitable manufacturers of automobiles before World War I.

Panhards won numerous races from 1895 to 1903. Panhard et Levassor developed the Panhard rod, which came to be used in many other types of automobiles as well.

From 1910 Panhard worked to develop engines without conventional valves, using under license the sleeve valve technology that had been patented by the American Charles Yale Knight. Between 1910 and 1924 the Panhard & Levassor catalogue listed plenty of models with conventional valve engines, but these were offered alongside cars powered by sleeve valve power units. Following various detailed improvements to the sleeve valve technology by Panhard's own engineering department, from 1924 till 1940 all Panhard cars used sleeve valve engines.

=== First World War ===
Under the presidency of Raymond Poincaré, which ran from 1913 till 1920, Panhard & Levassor's 18CV and 20CV models were the official presidential cars.

During the war Panhard, like other leading automobile producers, concentrated on war production, including large numbers of military trucks, V12-cylinder aero-engines, gun components, and large 75 and 105 diameter shells. The military were also keen on the sleeve valve-engined Panhard 20CV. General Joffre himself used two 35CV Panhard Type X35s with massive, four-cylinder 7,360 cc (449 cu in) engines for his personal transport, and these were frequently to be seen by Parisians carrying military leaders between the front-line and the Élysée Palace.

=== Inter-war period ===
Following the return to peace in 1918, Panhard resumed passenger car production in March 1919 with the 10HP Panhard Type X19, which used a 4-cylinder 2,140 cc (131 cu in) engine. This was followed three months later by three more 4-cylinder models which will have been familiar to any customers whose memories pre-dated the war, but they now incorporated upgraded electrics and a number of other modifications. For the 15th Paris Motor Show, in October 1919, Panhard were displaying four models, all with four cylinder engines, as follows:

- Panhard Type X19 2,150 cc / 10CV
- Panhard Type X31 2,275 cc / 12CV

(This replaced the 12 HP Panhard Type 25 for 1920.)

- Panhard Type X28 3,175 cc / 16CV
- Panhard Type X29 4,850 cc / 20CV

By 1925, all Panhard's cars were powered by Knight sleeve valve engines that used steel sleeves. The steel sleeves were thinner and lighter than the cast iron ones that had been fitted in Panhard sleeve valve engines since 1910, and this already gave rise to an improved friction coefficient permitting engines to run at higher speeds. To reduce further the risk of engines jamming, the outer sleeves, which are less thermally stressed than the inner sleeves, were coated on their inner sides with an anti-friction material, employing a patented technique with which Panhard engineers had been working since 1923. This was one of several improvements applied by Panhard engineers to the basic Knight sleeve-valve engine concept.

In 1925 a 4.8-litre model set the world record for the fastest hour run, an average of 185.51 km/h (115.271 mph).

A surprise appeared on the Panhard stand at the 20th Paris Motor Show in October 1926, in the shape of the manufacturer's first six-cylinder model since before the war. The new Panhard 16CV "Six" came with a 3445cc engine and sat on a 3,540 mm (139.4 in) wheelbase. At the show it was priced, in bare chassis form, at 58,000 francs. Of the nine models displayed for the 1927 model year, seven featured four-cylinder engines, ranging in capacity from 1480 cc (10CV) to 4845 cc (20CV), and in price from 31,000 francs to 75,000 francs (all in bare chassis form). Also on show was an example of the 8-cylinder 6350 cc (35CV) "Huit" model which Panhard had offered since 1921 and which at the 1926 show was priced by the manufacturer in bare chassis form at 99,000 francs.

When Panhard presented their 1931 line-up at the Paris Motor Show in October 1930, their last two four-cylinder models had been withdrawn, along with the 10CV six-cylinder Type X59. Instead they concentrated on their "S-series" cars, designated "Panhard CS" and "Panhard DS" according to engine size, and introduced a year earlier. Publicity of the time indicated the "S" stood for "Voitures surbaissées" (cars having an "underslung" chassis,) but, clearly captivated by the power of alliteration, added that "S" also indicated cars that were "...souples, supérieures, stables, spacieuses, silencieuses, sans soupapes (i.e., using valveless cylinders)...". Four of the five Panhards exhibited featured increasingly lavish and pricey 6-cylinder engined cars, their engine sizes ranging from 2.35-litres to 3.5-litres. There was also an 8-cylinder 5.1 L (310 cu in) Panhard Type X67 on display, with a generous 3,590 mm (141.3 in) wheelbase and listed, even in bare chassis form, at 85,000 francs.

Panhard et Levassor's last pre-war car was the unusually styled monocoque Dynamic series, first introduced in 1936.

Panhard et Levassor also produced railbuses, including some for the metre gauge Chemin de fer du Finistère.

=== Post-World War II era ===
After World War II the company was renamed Panhard (without "Levassor"), and produced light cars such as the Dyna X, Dyna Z, PL 17, 24 CT and 24 BT. The company had long noted the weight advantages of aluminum, and this as well as postwar government steel rationing (designed to limit new car models to ensure an orderly return to production at the major firms), encouraged the firm to proceed with the expensive alternative of making the bodies and several other components out of aluminum. Thus the Dyna X and early Dyna Z series 1 had aluminum bodies. Unfortunately, cost calculations by Jean Panhard, the inheriting son and managing director of the firm, failed to account for the extra cost of aluminum vs steel. His calculations were made for the sheet metal panel area actually utilized per body shell, and did not account for the scrap of each of the stampings making up the shell. Once in production, a re-examination showed a cost of 55,700fr for aluminum shells and only 15,600fr for steel. The use of aluminum had pushed the firm close to bankruptcy, and a hurried engineering job returned the firm to steel. Thus, the later Dyna Z (from mid September 1955) and the successor PL 17 bodies were steel, and the major stampings retained the heavier gauge intended for durability with aluminum, so as to avoid complete replacement of the stamping dies.

The air-cooled flat-twin engine of the Dyna was used by Georges Irat for his "Voiture du Bled" (VdB) off-road vehicle, built in Morocco in small numbers in the early 1950s.

Drawing inspiration from the Panhard Dynavia concept, the styling of the Dyna Z was distinctively smooth and rounded, with an emphasis on aerodynamics and an overall minimalist design. The 24CT was a later (from summer 1963 on) stylish 2+2 seater; the 24BT being a version of the same with a longer wheelbase and space for four.

For a period after the war, the Panhard-based Monopole racing cars received unofficial support from Panhard (as did DB and other clients such as Robert Chancel), using it to good effect in winning the "Index of Performance" class at Le Mans in 1950, 1951, and 1952. In 1953, Panhard moved on to a more direct involvement with Chancel, which however came to an end after the deadly 1955 Le Mans. In the latter half of the 1950s and the early 1960s, the Deutsch Bonnet racers ("DB Panhard") picked up this mantle and went on to dominate the "Index of Performance" as well as other small-engine racing classes.

The last Panhard passenger car was built in 1967. After assembling 2CV panel trucks for Citroën to utilize capacity during falling sales, and raising operating cash by selling ownership progressively to Citroën, respectively to its mother company Michelin (full control as of 1965), in autumn of 1967 the civilian branch was absorbed by Citroën, and the marque was retired. From 1968 Panhard only made armored vehicles.

In 2004, Panhard lost a competition to another manufacturer of military vehicles, Auverland, for the choice of the future PVP of the French Army. This allowed Auverland to purchase Panhard, then a subsidiary of PSA Peugeot Citroën, in 2005. However, the fame of Panhard being greater, it was decided to retain the name; the PVP designed by Auverland would bear a Panhard badge.

In 2007, it was reported that PSA Group was considering reviving the Panhard name for use on a range of luxury vehicles akin to Toyota's Lexus brand. A revival did not occur, although DS Automobiles was later launched as PSA's premium brand.

In October 2012, Renault Trucks Defense, division of Swedish Volvo Group since 2001, finalized the acquisition of Panhard for 62.5 million euros.

Today the only use of the name Panhard is in the Panhard rod (also called Panhard bar), a suspension link invented by Panhard that provides lateral location of the axle. This device has been widely used on other automobiles or as an aftermarket upgrade to rear axles for vintage American cars.

== Models ==
=== Panhard car models ===
Type	Construction period
Panhard 15 CV	1904–1907
Panhard 24 CV	1904–1906
Panhard 35 CV	1906–1909
Panhard Dyna X	1945–1954
Panhard Dynavia	1948
Panhard Dyna Junior	1951–1956
Panhard Dyna Z	1953–1959
Panhard PL 17/17	1959–1965
Panhard CD	1962–1965
Panhard 24	1963–1967

=== Cars with Panhard technology ===
Type	Construction period
Dyna Veritas	1949–1954
Rosengart Scarlette	1952
DB HBR 5	1954–1961
DB Le Mans	1958–1964
Sera-Panhard	1959–1961

=== Partial lists of trucks and buses (not armoured) ===
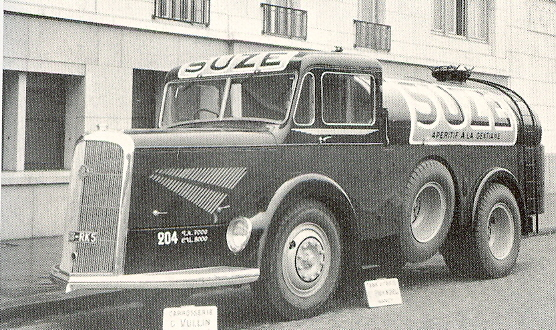
Panhard K 50 from the 1930s

Model designation	Type	Introduction date (decade)
K 4	Truck	1910s
2 tonnes	Truck	1920s
2.5 tonnes	Truck	1910s
K 101	Truck	1930s
K 11	Truck	1910s
K 113	Truck	1930s
K 125	Truck	1930s
K 128	Truck	1930s
K 13	Truck	1910s
K 140	Truck	1930s
K 155	Truck	1940s
K 161	Bus	1940s
K 162	Truck	1940s
K 172	Truck	1940s
K 173	Bus	1940s
K 175	Truck/bus	1940s
K 185	Truck	1950s
K 188 (ALM VS 215)	Truck	1940s
K 219 (ALM VS 237)	Truck	1950s
K 224	Truck	1950s
K 332	Truck	1950s
K 48	Truck/bus	1930s
K 50	Truck	1930s
K 61	Truck/bus	1930s
K 63	Bus	1930s
K 73	Truck/bus	1930s
K 85	Truck	1930s
K 91	Truck	1930s
K 944	Truck	1950s
Notes
The K nomenclature was standardised for Panhard cargo vehicles by the early 20th century. However, Panhard also had, for the same models listed, two other naming options: a 5-letter system designating the class and other using a combination of letters and numbers for the chassis type

== Current military models ==
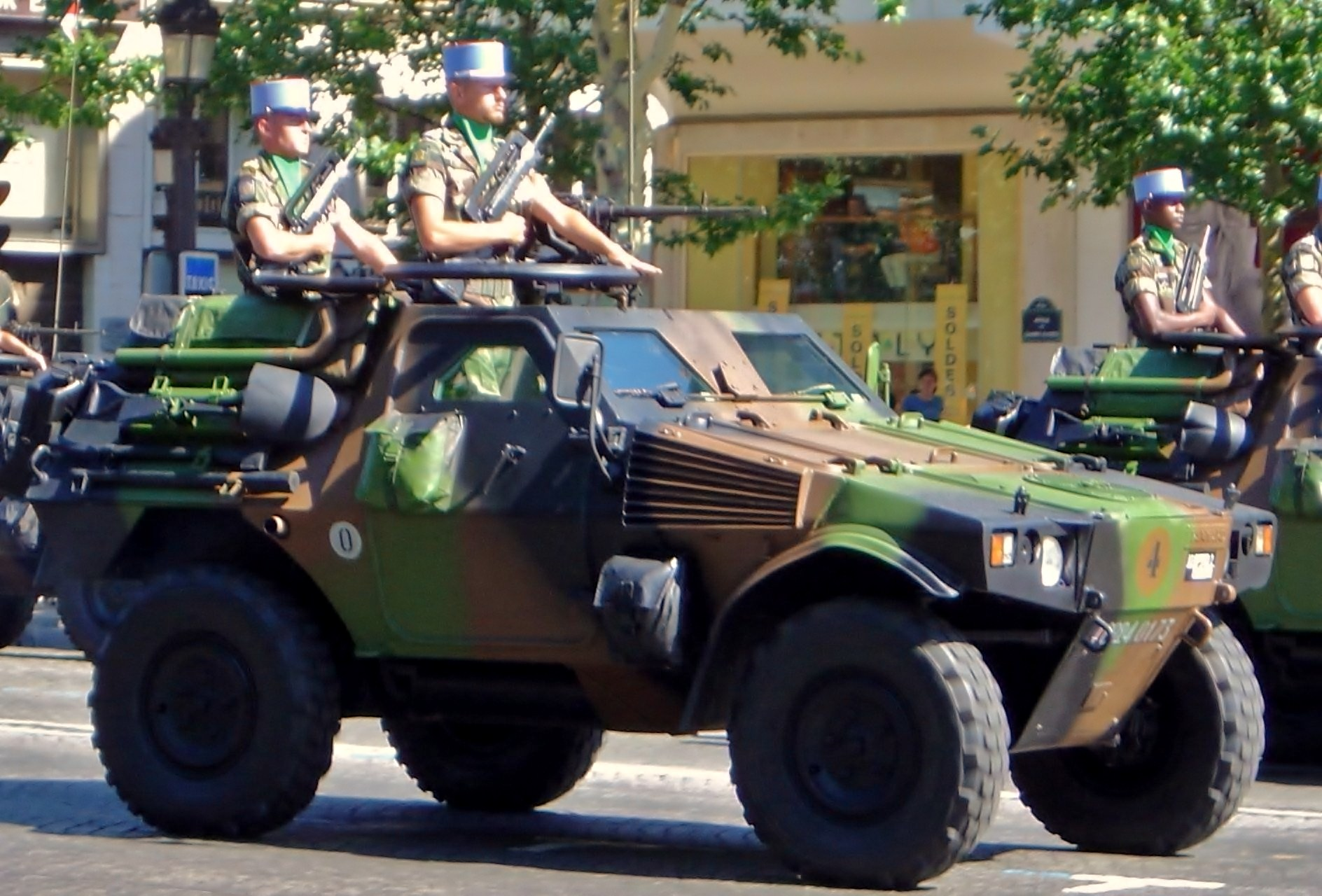
A VBL of the French Army

- VBL
- PVP
- EBR
- PVPXL / AVXL: an enlarged AVL
- TC 54
- TC 10
- TC 24
- A3
- Peugeot P4
- ERC 90 Sagaie
- VBR: enlarged VBL multipurpose armored vehicle
- VAP: Véhicule d'Action dans la Profondeur (deep penetration vehicle), VBL based special operations vehicle
- VPS: P4 based SAS Patrol vehicle
- Panhard CRAB

== Vehicles in service ==
Panhard has supplied more than 18,000 military wheeled vehicles to over 50 countries with a range of combat vehicles weighing less than 10 tonnes, as follows:

- 5,400 armoured wheeled vehicles (AML, ERC 90 Sagaie, and LYNX VCR 6x6)
- 2,300 VBL in 16 countries which includes 1600 in service with the French Army
- 933 A4 AVL—PVP—selected by the French Army
- 9,500 vehicles under 7 tonnes; most being jeep-like vehicles produced under the Auverland name.

== Gallery ==
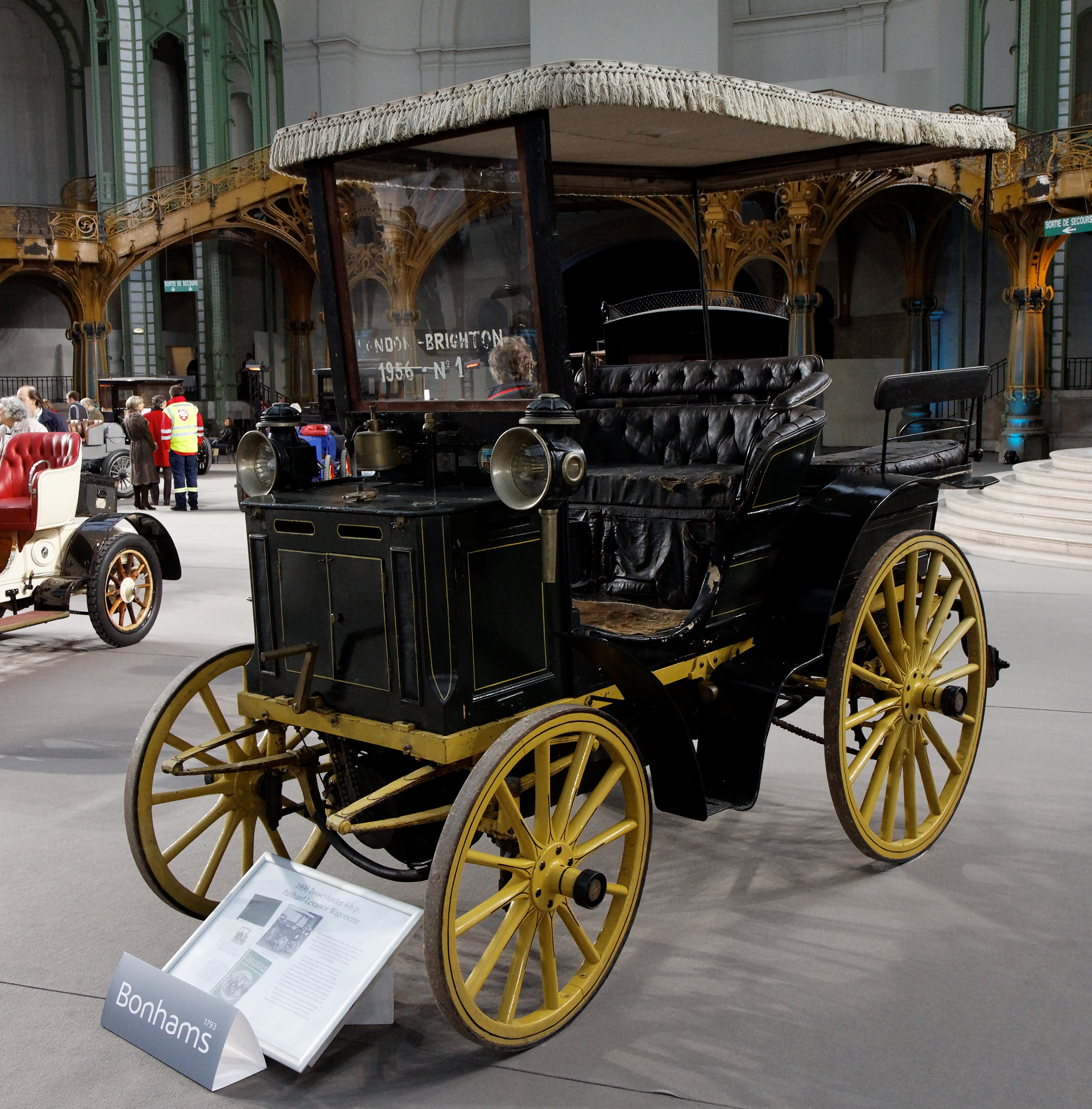
Panhard et Levassor 4 CV with Wagonette body (1896)

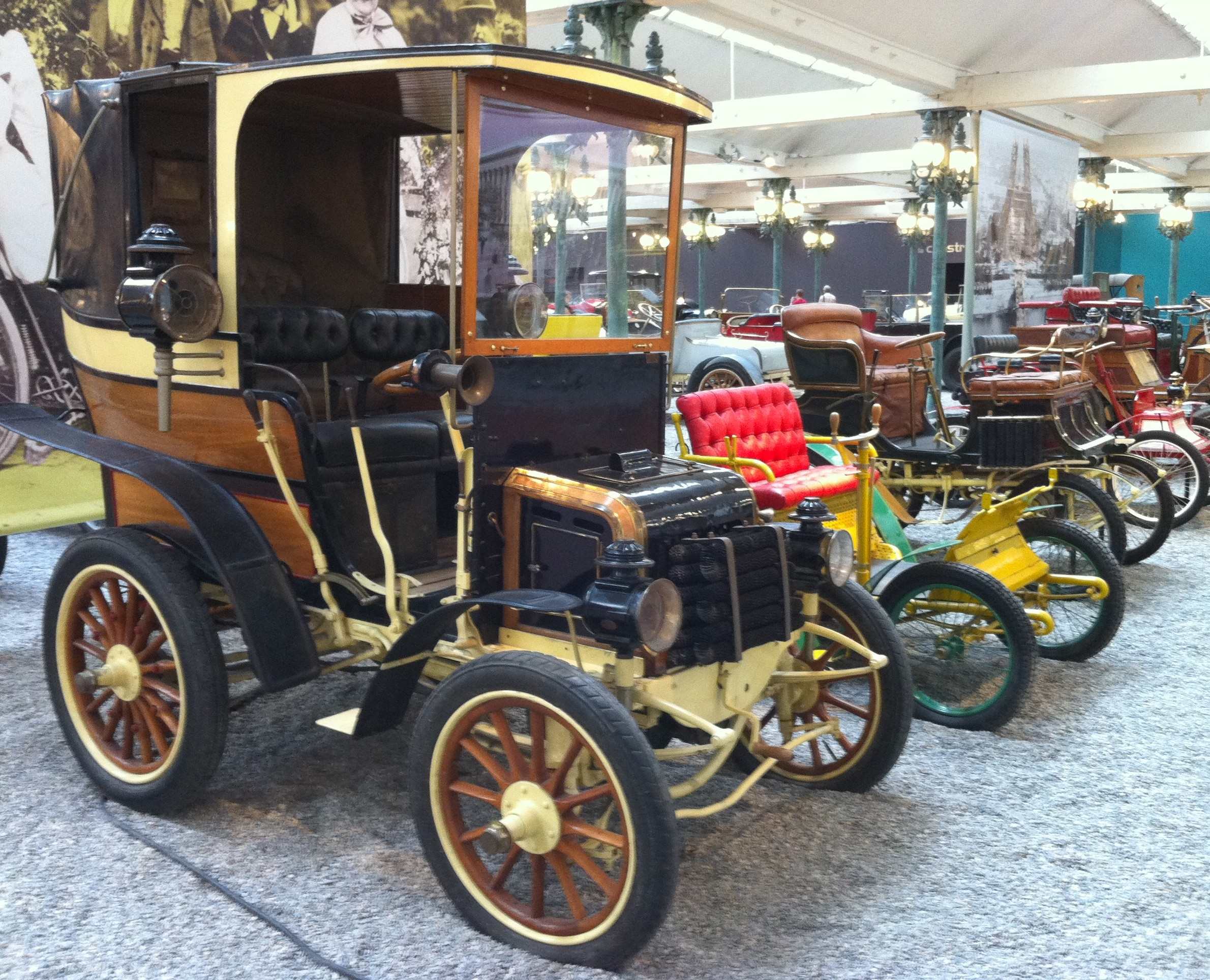
Panhard et Levassor Landaulette type A1 (1898)

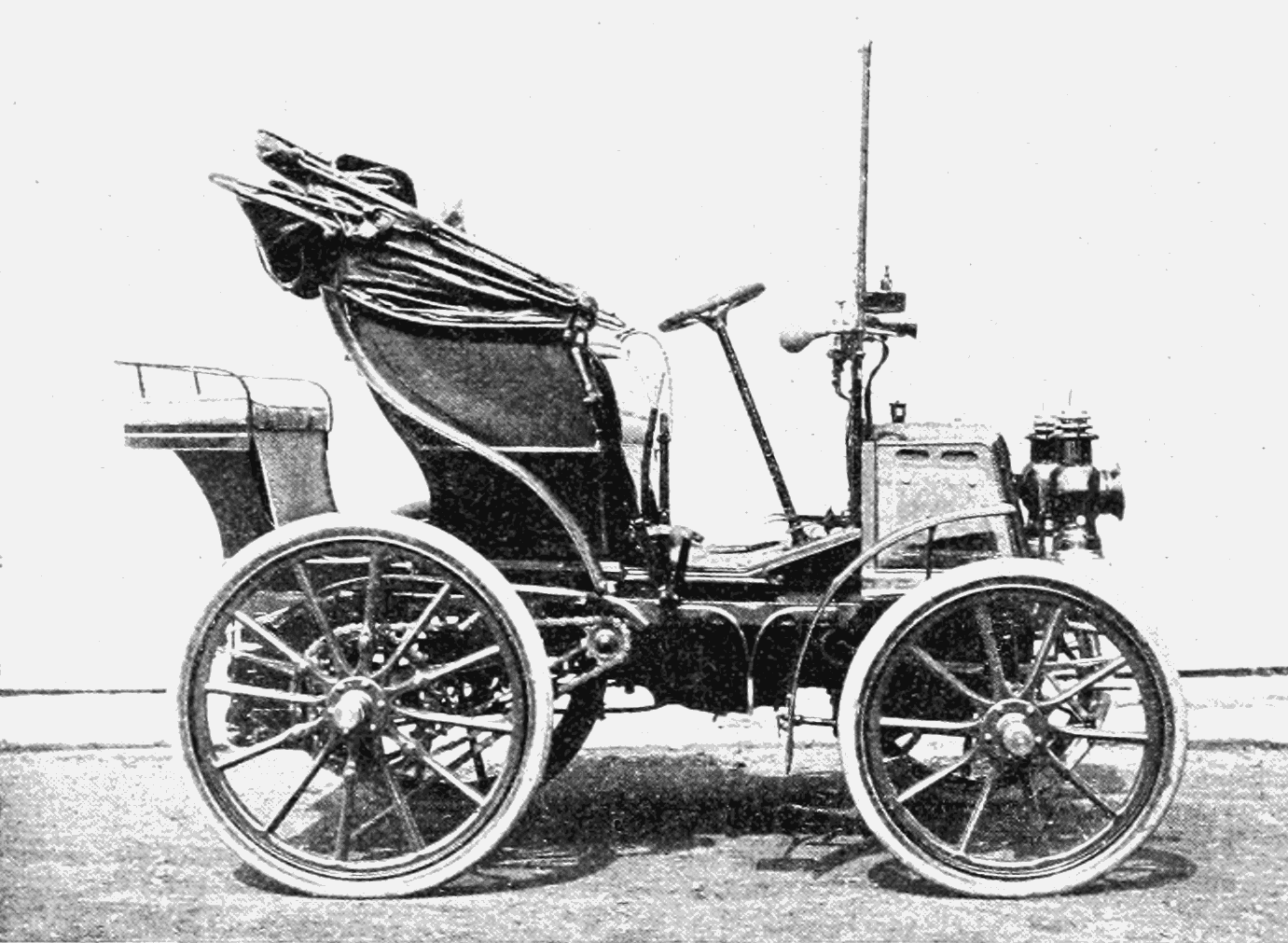
Panhard et Levassor automobile circa 1900

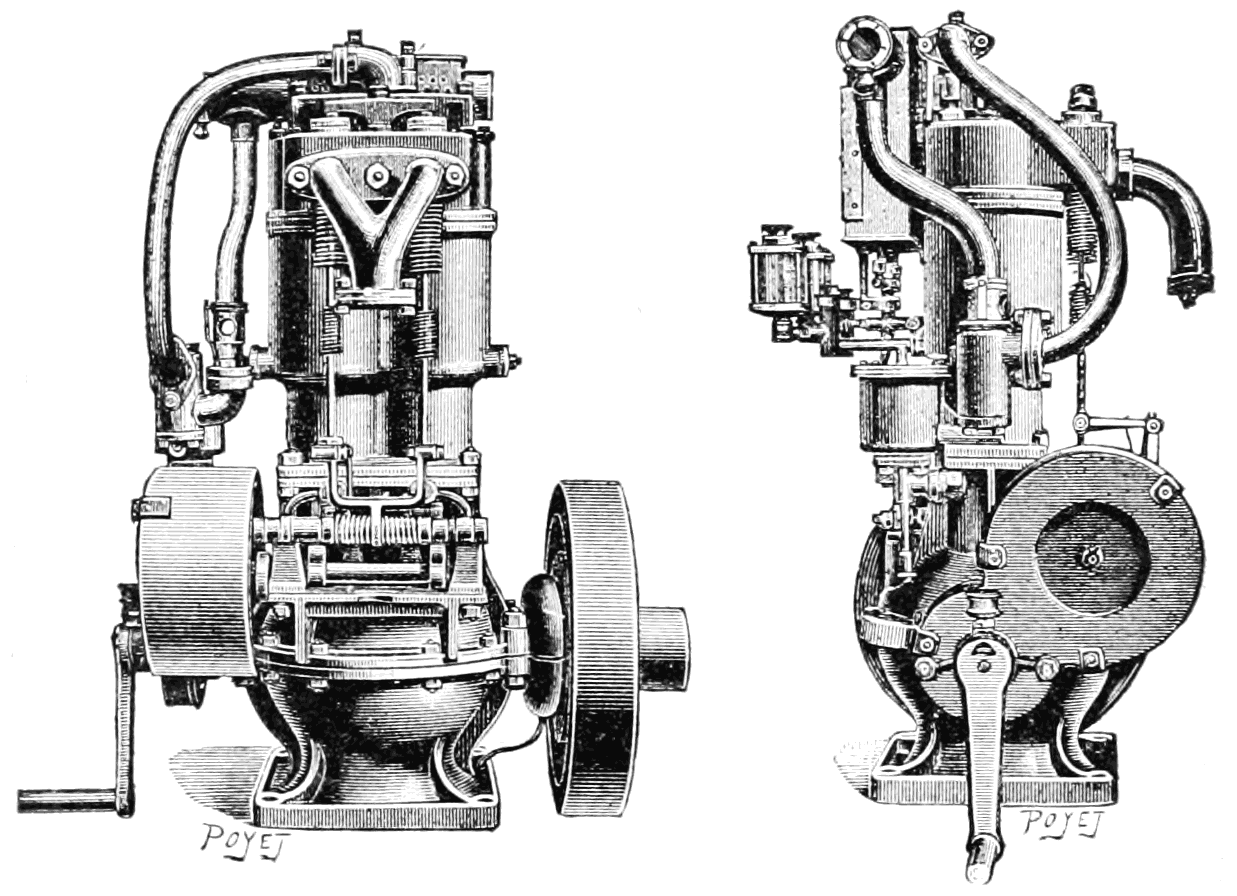
Panhard et Levassor water-cooled 2-cylinder automobile engine, circa 1900

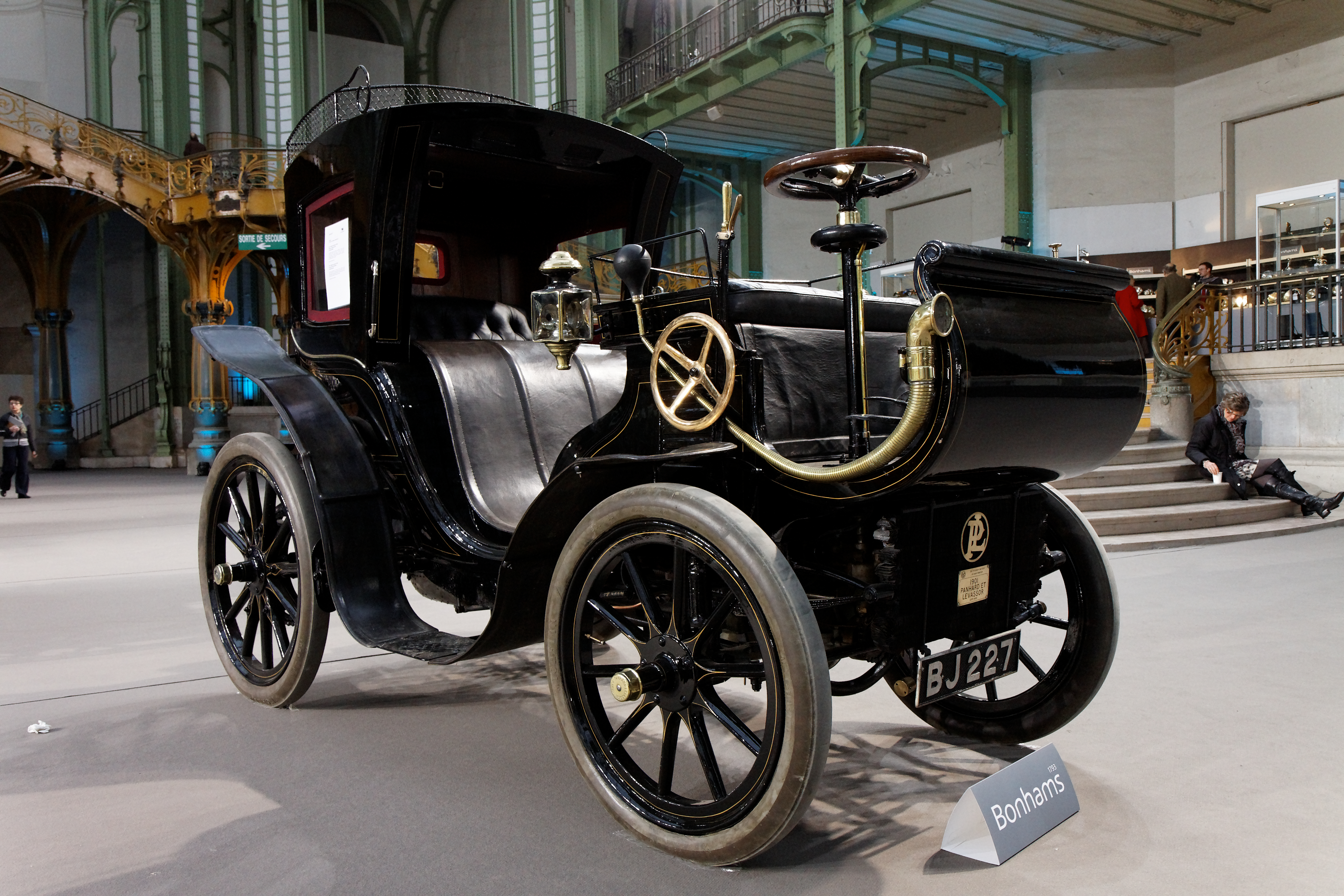
Panhard et Levassor 2,4 litres Phaéton coachwork by Kellner (1901)

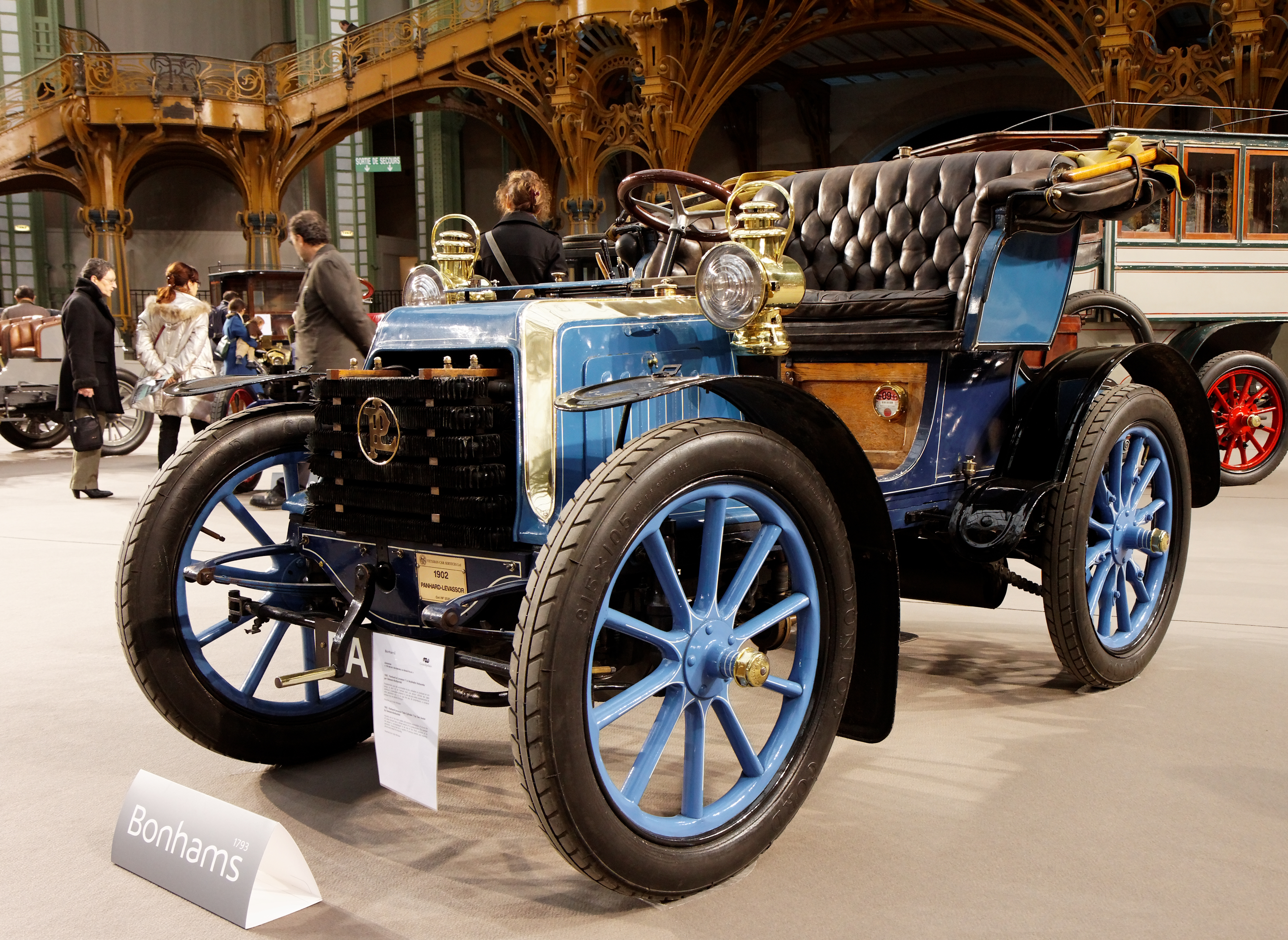
Panhard et Levassor 7 CV Voiturette (1902)

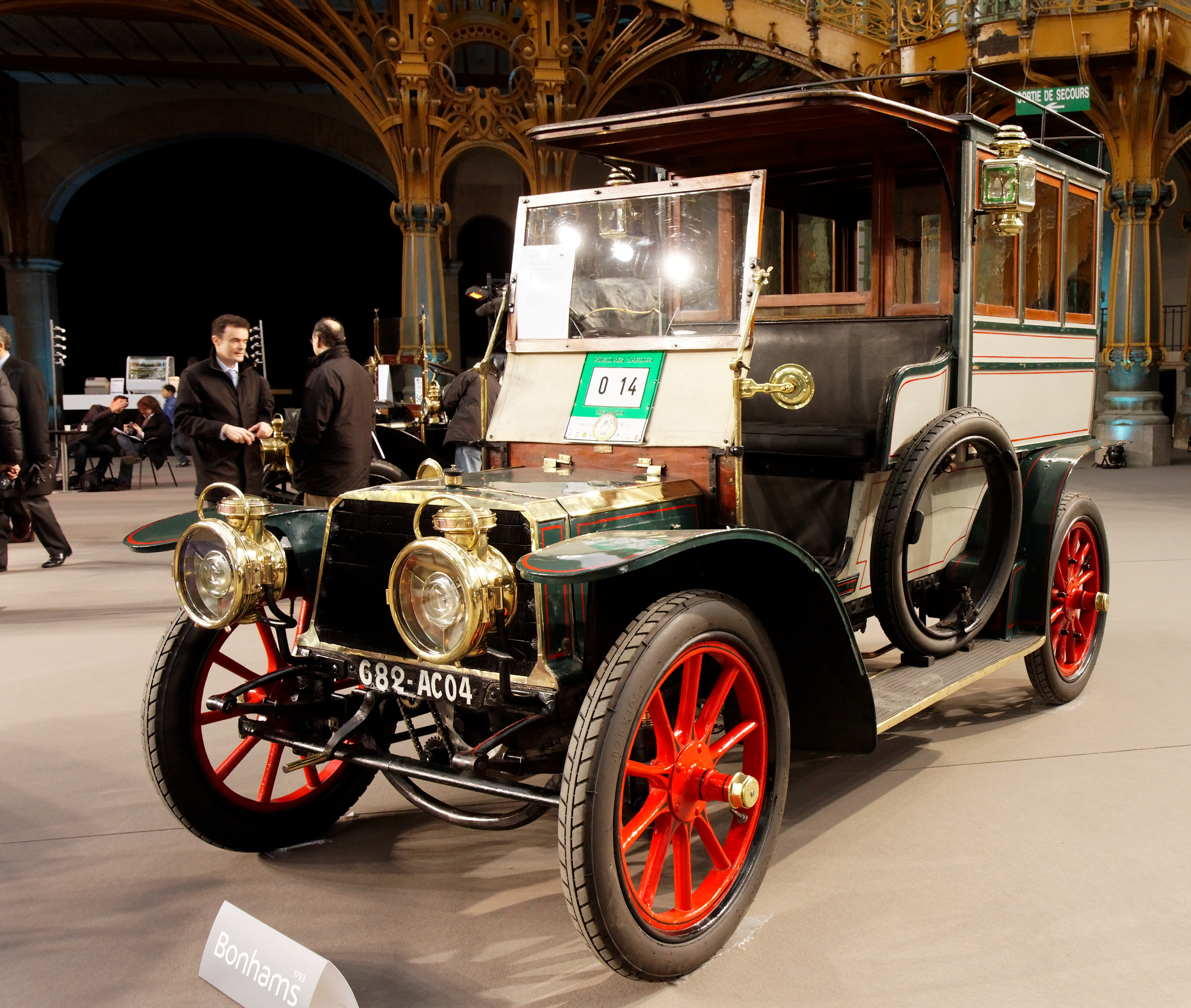
Panhard et Levassor Char-à-banc (1903)

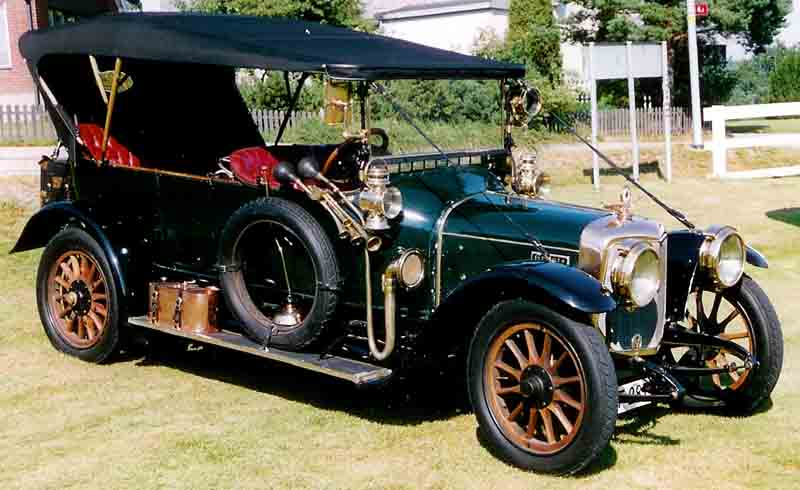
Panhard et Levassor 10 CV (1914)

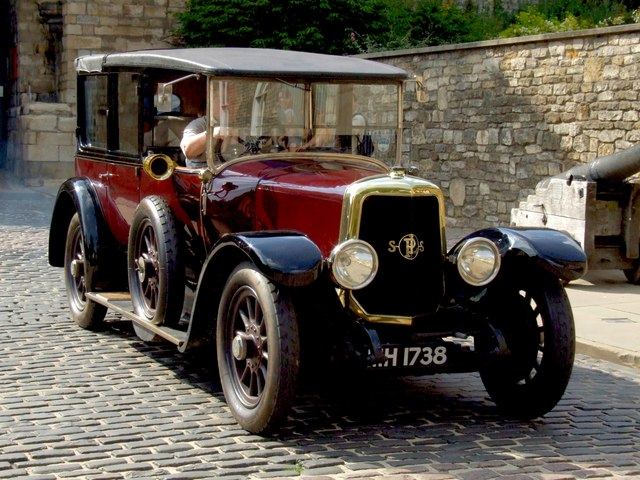
Panhard et Levassor X46 2300cc (1924) Saloon by Salmons and Son, Tickford

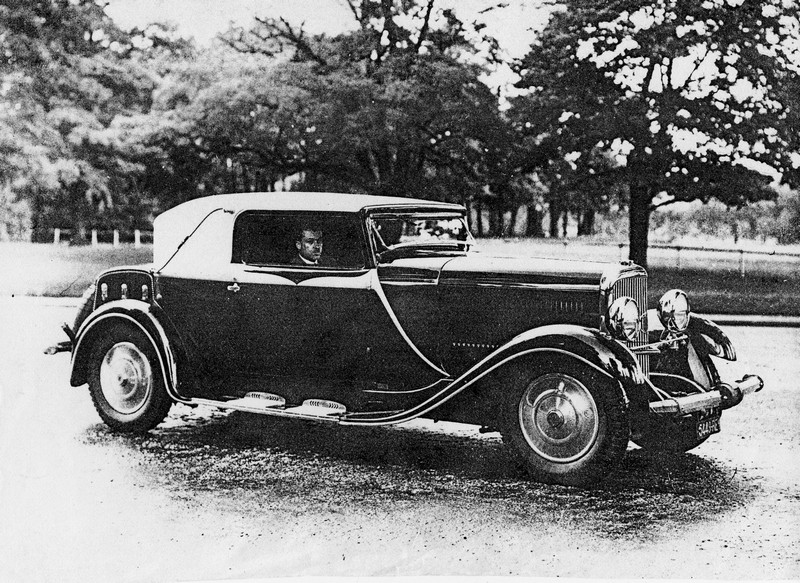
Panhard et Levassor Cabrio-Coupé Pourtout

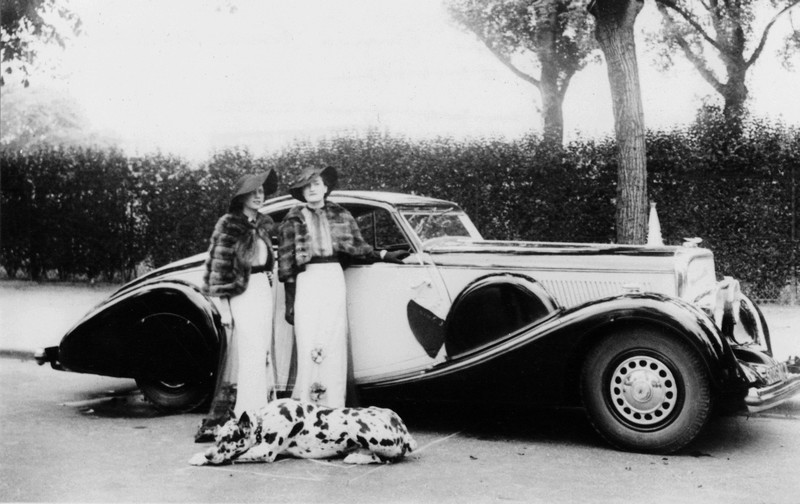
Panhard et Levassor Eclipse (1934) Pourtout

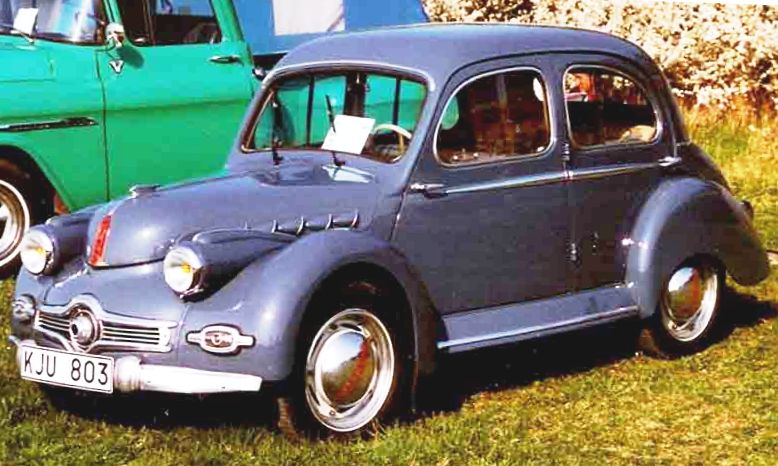
Panhard Dyna X 86 Saloon (1952)

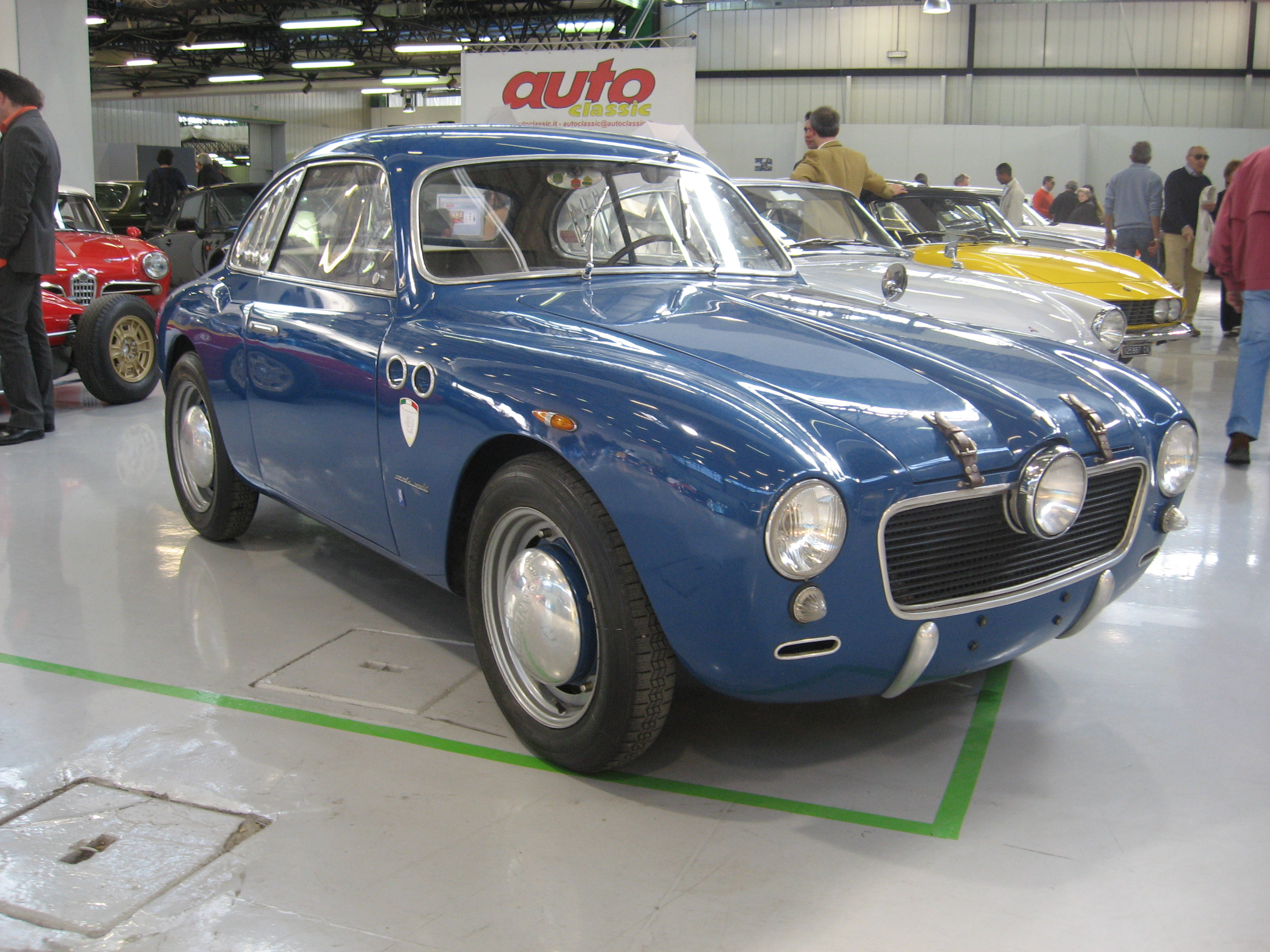
Panhard Dyna 750 Coupé Allemano (1952)

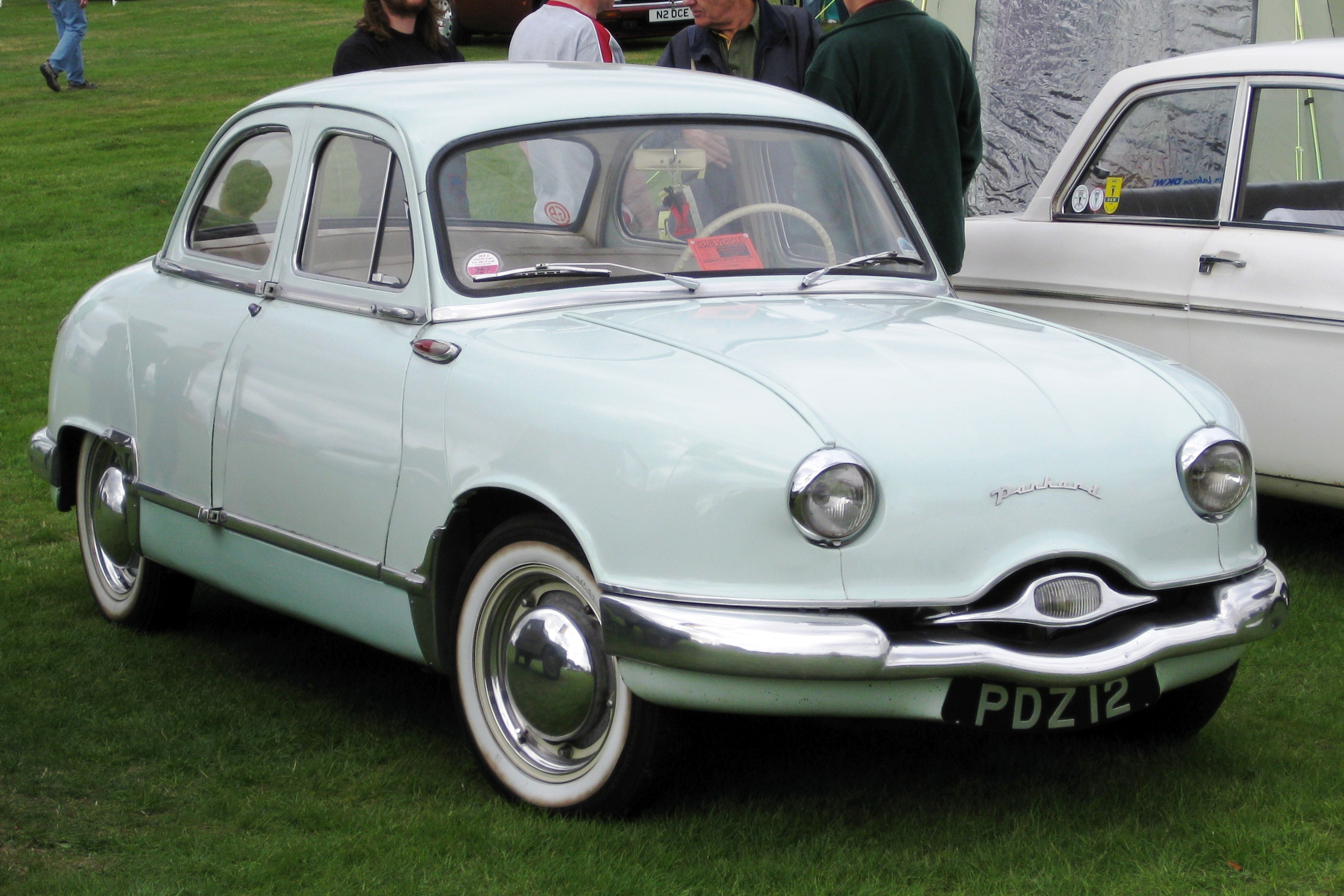
Panhard Dyna Z (1958)

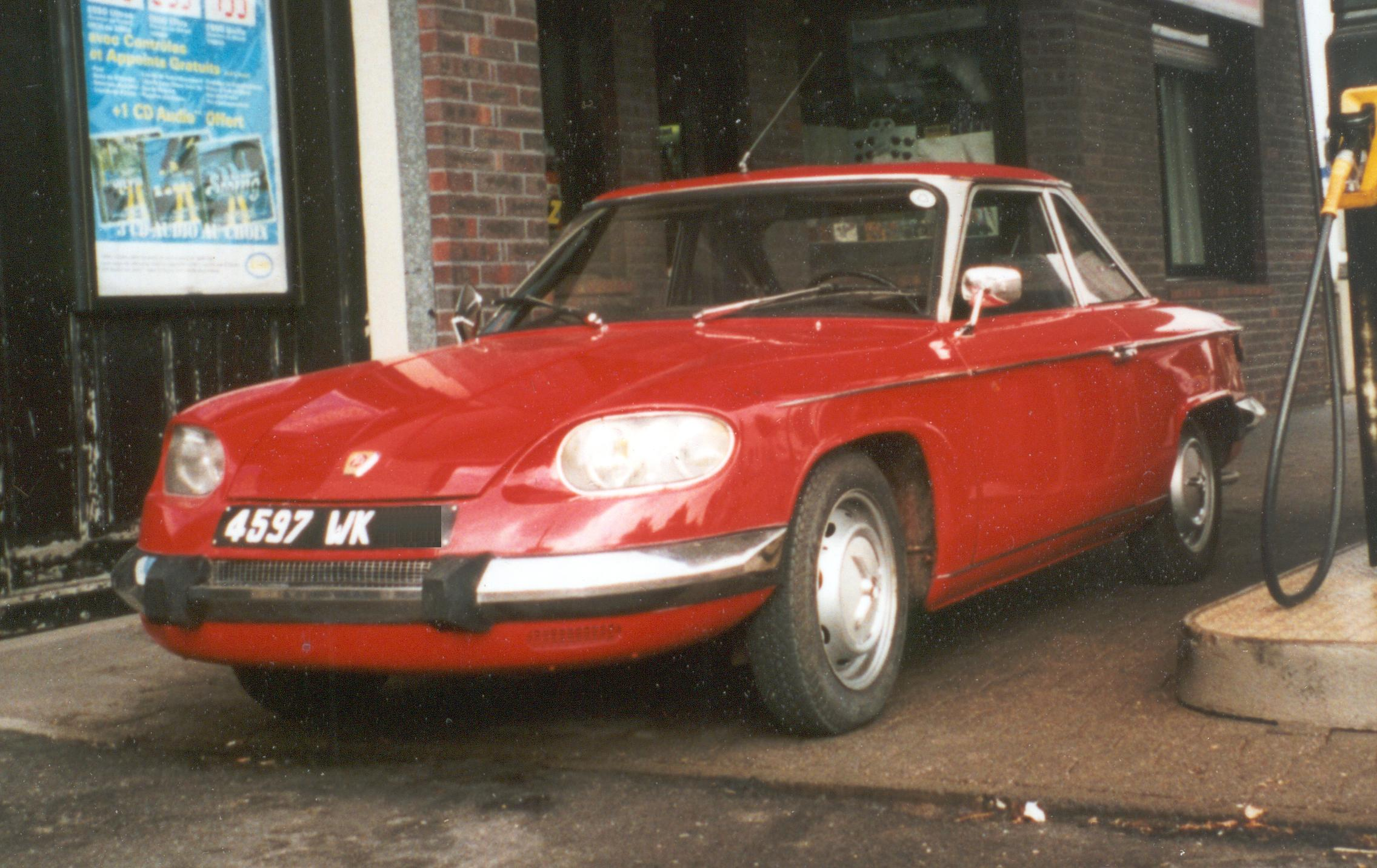
Panhard 24 CT, (1966)

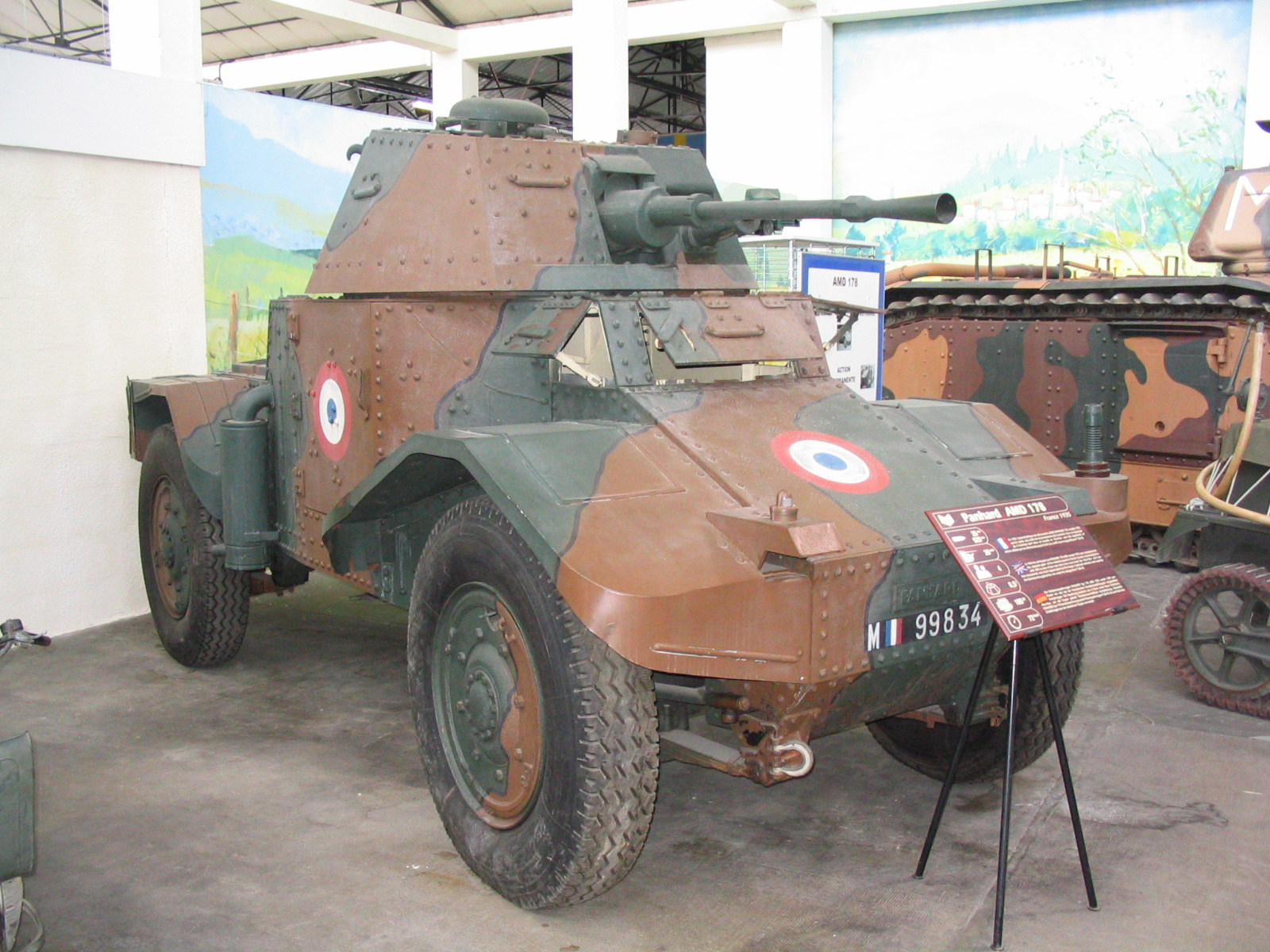
Panhard 178

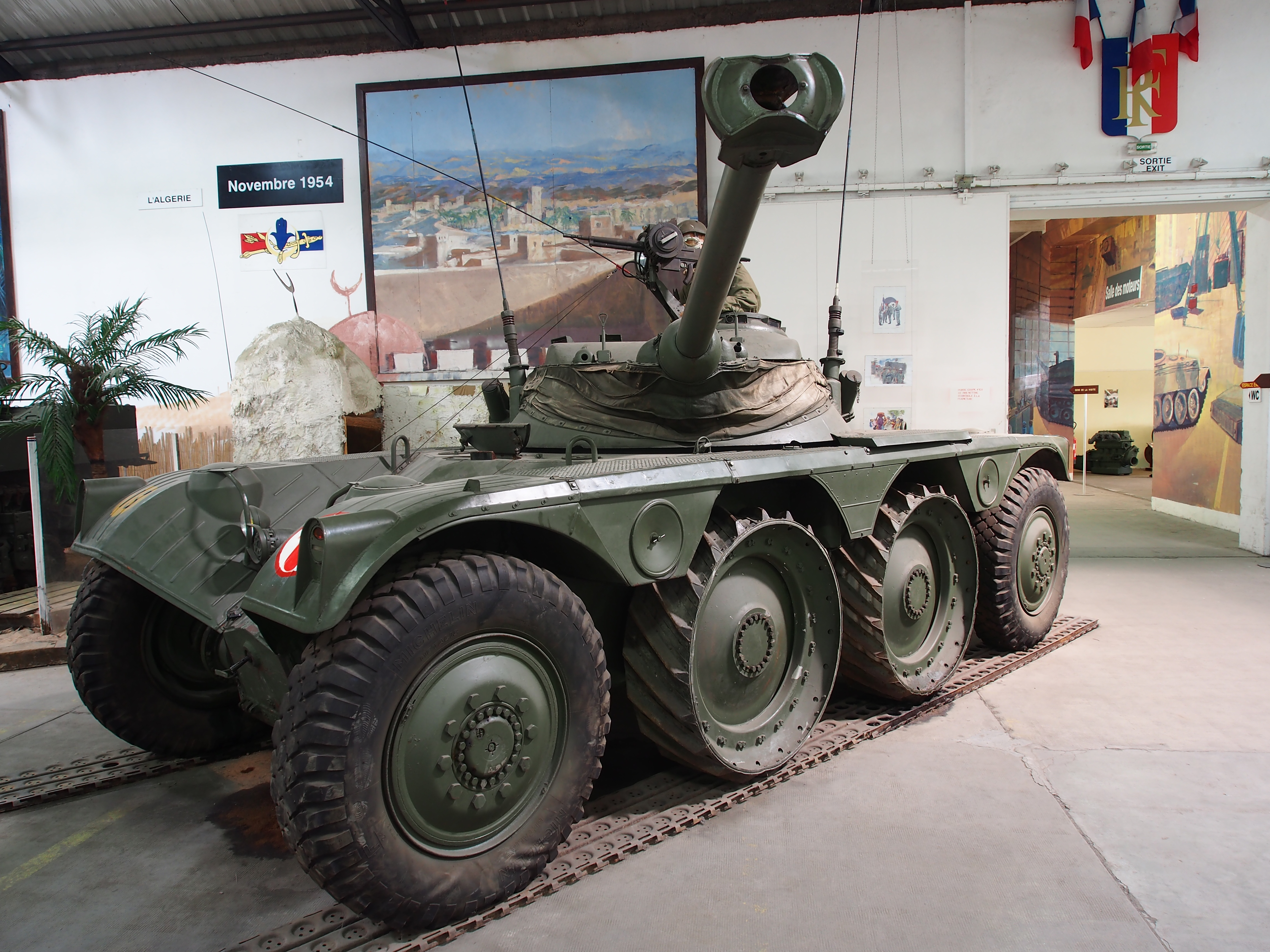
Engin Blindé de Reconnaissance 75

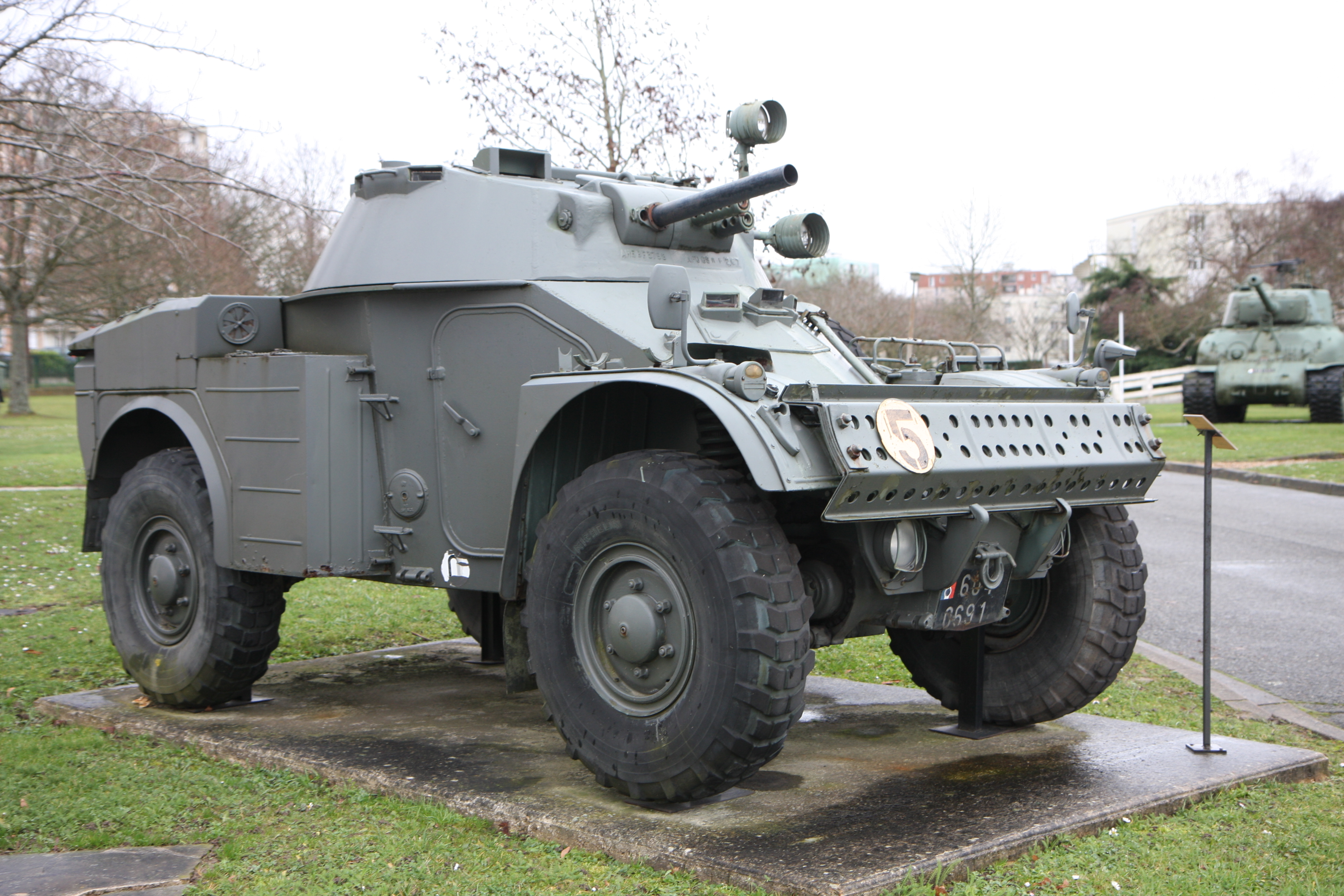
Auto Mitrailleuse Légère HE-60-7

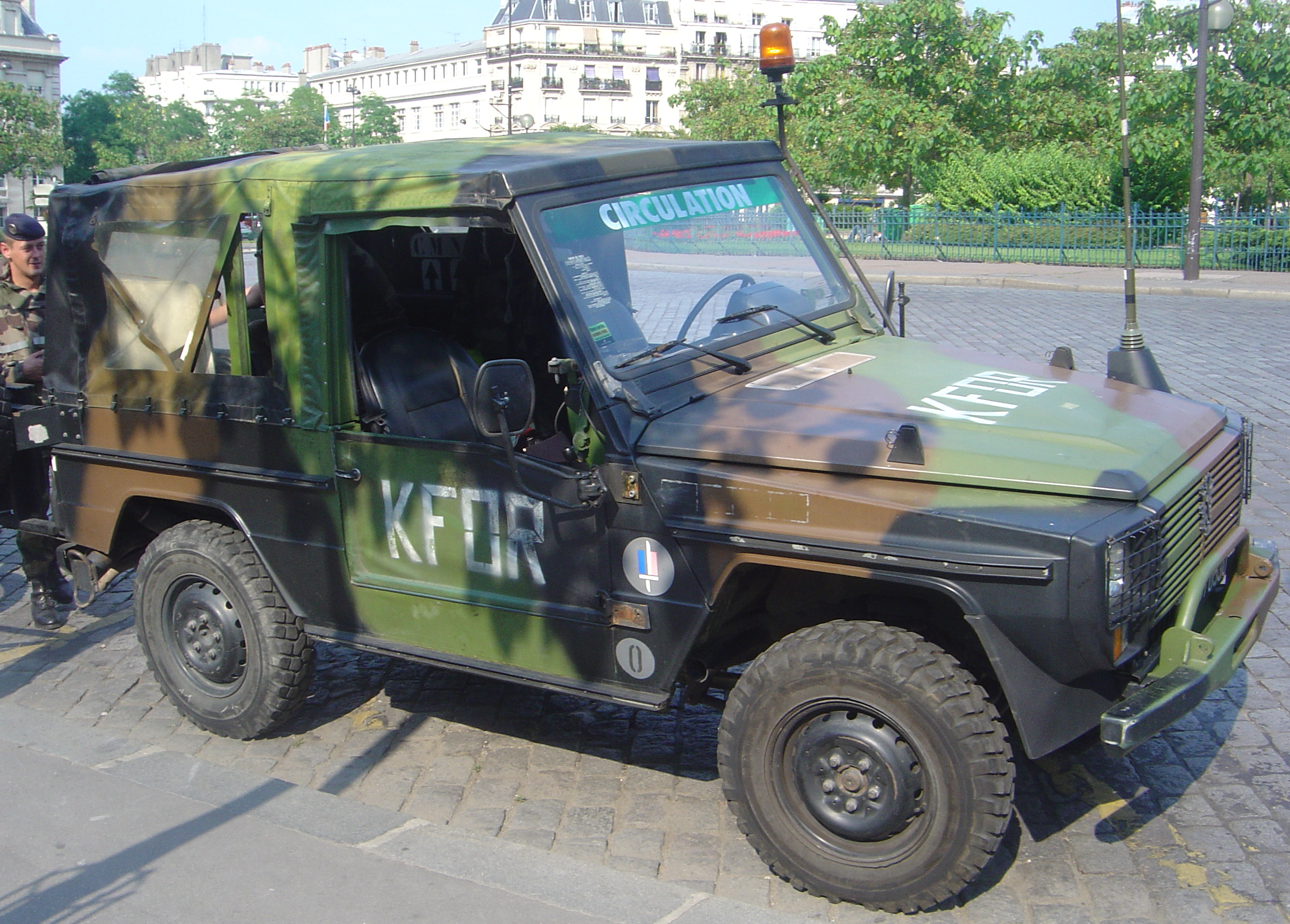
P4

== See also ==
- ACMAT
- St Chamond (tank)
- Panhard 178
- Panhard EBR
- Panhard AML
- Arthur Constantin Krebs, Panhard General Manager from 1897 to 1916
- Panhard bar, a suspension component designed by Panhard still in automotive use
