= Véhicule d'Action dans la Profondeur =

The Véhicule d'Action dans la Profondeur is a military vehicle built by Panhard. It has an empty weight of 2500 kg and a useful payload of 1500 kg, and is a stealthy vehicle intended for use deep in hostile territory. It is an improvement on the design of the Véhicule Blindé Léger, retaining the armoured floor (for protection against landmines) but with side armour and doors removed. It has a Steyr diesel engine and can be fitted with a variety of weapons.

== See also ==
- Véhicule Blindé Léger
