= Panhard Dyna X =

Panhard Dyna X Panhard Dyna 110 / 120 / 130
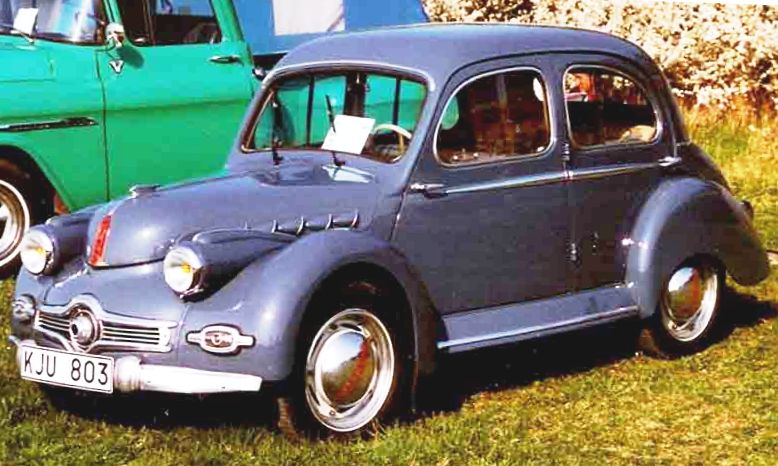

Overview
- Manufacturer: Société des Anciens Etablissements Panhard et Levassor
- Production: 1948–1954; 47,049 built
- Designer: Jean Albert Grégoire

Body and chassis
- Class: Subcompact car
- Body style: 4-door berline 3-door estate 2-door cabriolet Light Van
- Layout: Front engine, front-wheel drive

Powertrain
- Engine: 610 cc H2; 745 cc H2; 851 cc H2
- Transmission: 4-speed manual Column mounted control

Dimensions
- Wheelbase: 2,130 mm (84 in)
- Length: 3,820 mm (150 in)
- Width: 1,440 mm (57 in)
- Height: 1,530 mm (60 in)
- Curb weight: 550 kg (1,210 lb)−615 kg (1,356 lb)

Chronology
- Successor: Panhard Dyna Z

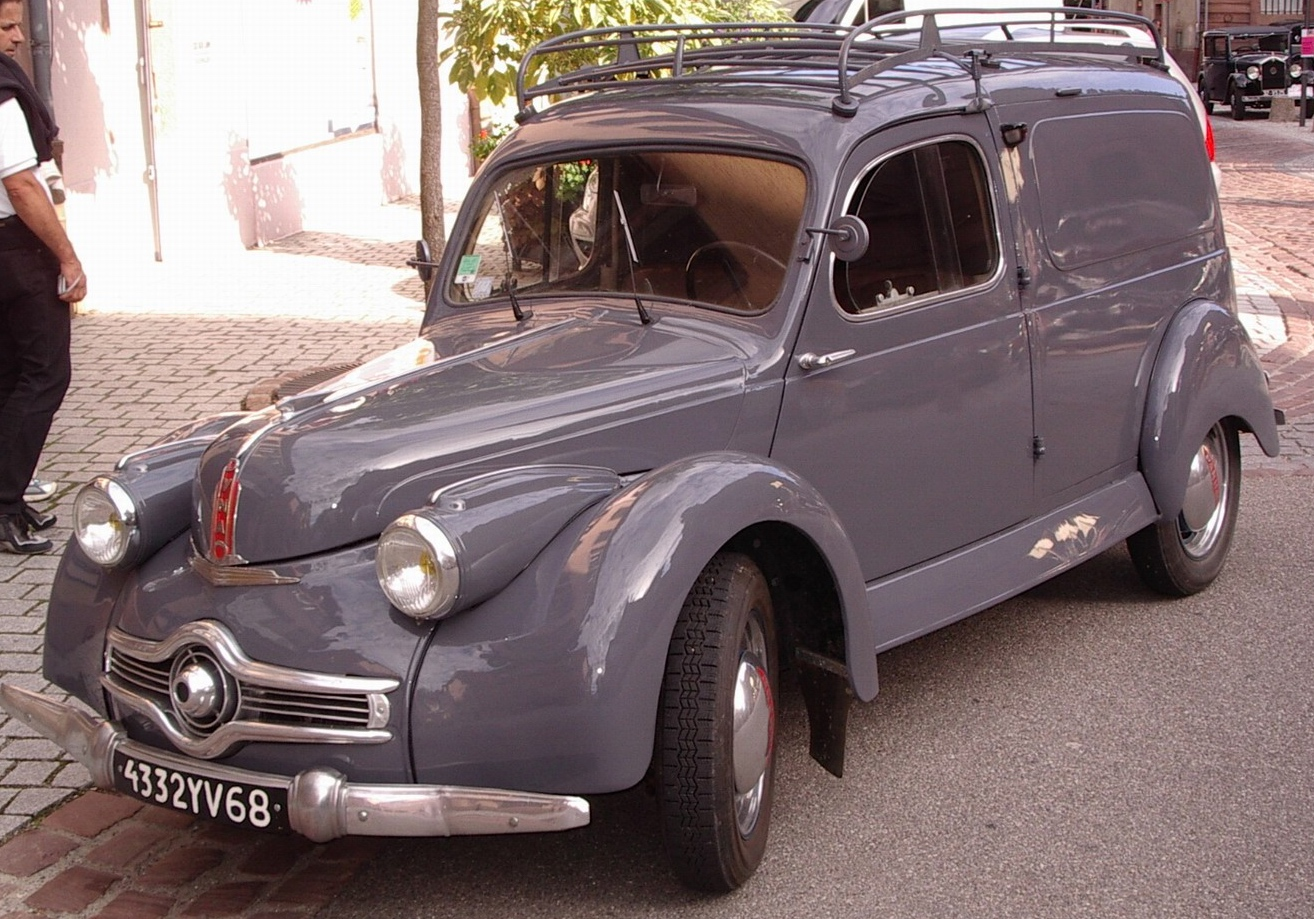
A fourgonette / light van Dyna X was also offered

The Panhard Dyna X was a lightweight berline produced by the French manufacturer Panhard from 1948 to 1954. It was designed by the engineer Jean Albert Grégoire and first exhibited as the AFG (Aluminium Français Grégoire) Dyna at the Paris Motor Show in October 1946.

== Conception and development ==
Mindful of the precarious economic situation in France following the Second World War, and aware of government enthusiasm for expanding the strategically important aluminium industry, the Panhard company, which had been known in the 1930s as a manufacturer of expensive six- and eight-cylinder sedans, purchased the rights to build the smaller Grégoire-designed car. The dramatic change of direction was not well received by everyone at Panhard, but it did usher in a period during which Panhard was one of the most loyal followers of the Pons Plan. In view of the fates of France's luxury auto-makers in the next ten years, and the huge development potential that Panhard extracted from the Dyna X, this adherence to the Pons Plan was probably good for Panhard, at least until the early 1960s. The Dyna was made production ready and was emerging in commercial quantities from Panhard's Ivry plant by 1948: it set the pattern for Panhard passenger cars until the firm abandoned automobile production in 1967.

== Models built ==
| Model | Chassis | Years built | Displacement | Taxable horsepower | Horsepower |
|---|---|---|---|---|---|
| Dyna 100 | X 84 | 12/1945 – 08/1949 | 610 cc (37.2 cu in) | 3 CV | 22 PS (16 kW) |
| Dyna 110 | X 85 | 01/1950 – 01/1953 | 610 cc (37.2 cu in) | 3 CV | 28 PS (21 kW) |
| Dyna 120 | X 86 | 01/1950 – 01/1953 | 745 cc (45.5 cu in) | 4 CV | 33 PS (24 kW) |
| Dyna 120 Sprint | X 86 | 02/1950 – 06/1953 | 745 cc (45.5 cu in) | 4 CV | 36-37 PS (26-27 kW) |
| Dyna 130 | X 87 | 04/1952 – 10/1953 | 851 cc (51.9 cu in) | 5 CV | 38 PS (28 kW) |
| Dyna 130 Sprint | X 87 | 04/1952 – 10/1953 | 851 cc (51.9 cu in) | 5 CV | 42 PS (31 kW) |
| Scarlette | X 90 | 05/1953 – 05/1954 | 851 cc (51.9 cu in) | 5 CV | 40 PS (29 kW) |

The names Dyna 110, Dyna 120 and Dyna 130 represented the cars' progressively increasing maximum speeds (in kilometers per hour), as engine power and size increased during the production run.

The Dyna X berline was replaced by the larger Panhard Dyna Z in 1954, although some of the sporting derivatives continued in production for a few more years.

== The Body ==
During the 1920s and 1930s, Grégoire had become known for his expertise in two particular areas of automobile construction, these being lightweight bodies and front wheel drive. The AFG Dyna, planned under difficult circumstances in occupied France, had an all-steel tubular frame chassis, to which was attached a lightweight aluminium four-door superstructure. The style of the berline was modern and aerodynamic. Contemporary press photographs showing the car with three elegant young women seated in the front and three more in the back were presumably designed to emphasize the car's interior space, and the Dyna X certainly was usefully wider than the Renault 4CV. Nevertheless, the photographs almost certainly employed exceptionally thin young ladies and/or a certain degree of image manipulation, and it would have made more sense, even in that age of austerity, to view the Dyna X as a four seater for most purposes. At the back the usefully commodious luggage compartment was unencumbered by any spare wheel, since that was mounted on the rear panel outside the car. There was no exterior access to the luggage, which will have saved weight and expense, but from the passenger cabin it was possible to access the rear luggage compartment by tipping forward the rear seat cushion.

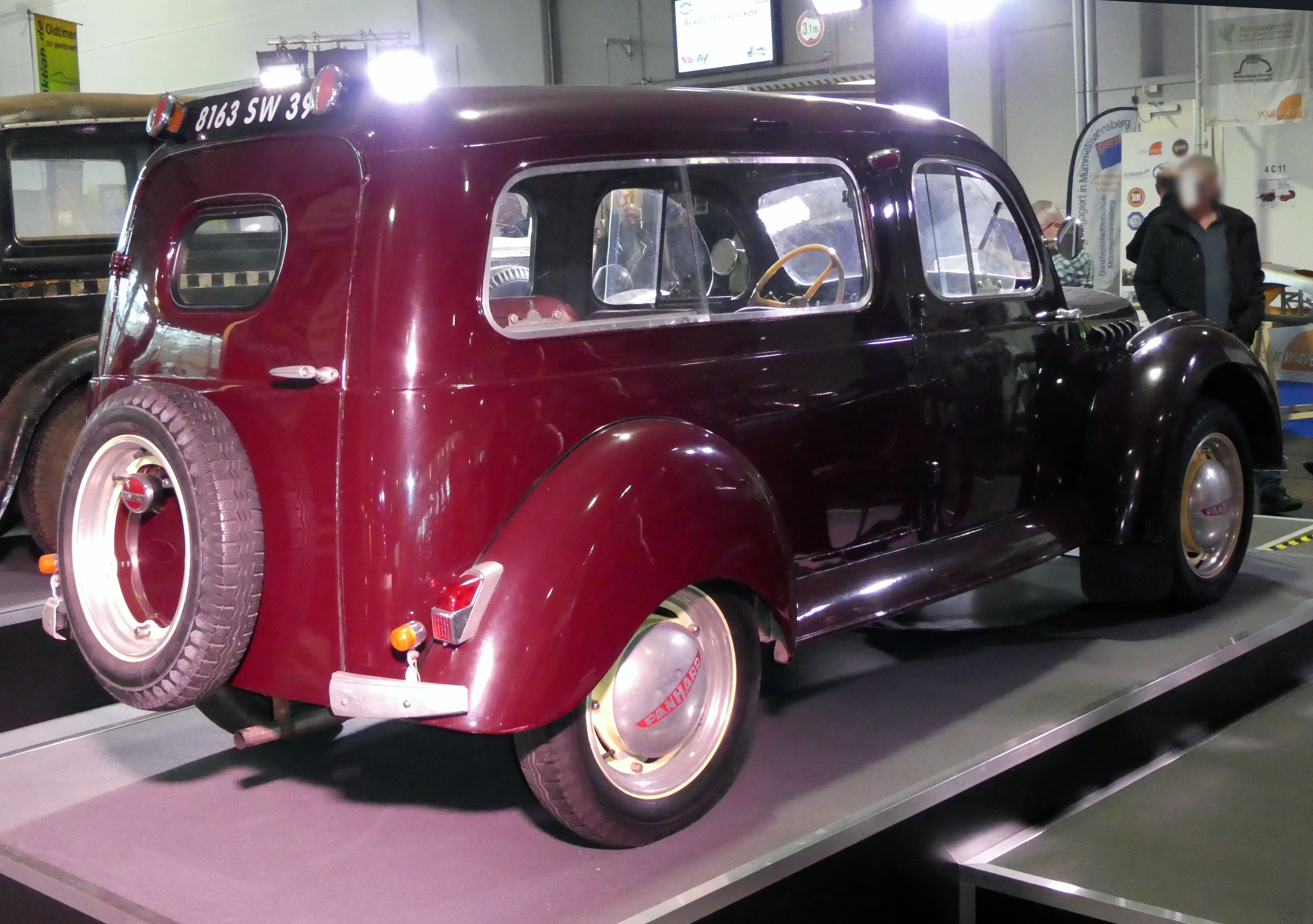
A 1952 Panhard Dyna X 120 Break

The compact engine and the lack of a radiator permitted a wind-cheating front design on which the headlights perched like frogs' eyes, between the wings and bonnet line. The shape of the car changed little during its model life, but one change that did occur involved the headlights and took place early in 1948 when the stand-alone conventionally formed headlights were replaced by headlights that could be described as integrated into the bodywork, by means of a reducing torpedo shaped molding linking the rear of each headlight to the space between the wing and the hood/bonnet. The front grille also changed at least once.

Alternative bodies included the two-door cabriolet and a 3-door estate version ("Break"). A "Fourgonette" light van version was also offered.

The chassis and engine of the Dyna turned up in the Panhard Dyna Junior sports car of 1951 and were also a popular basis for low-volume lightweight sports cars produced by specialist manufacturers.

The chassis of the Dyna X was also used as the basis of the Panhard Dynavia aerodynamic concept cars of 1948.

== The Engine ==
The Dyna X's low profile engine was characteristically idiosyncratic. Designed by Louis Delagarde, the two cylinder front mounted boxer unit was air-cooled. At launch in 1946, the 610 cc unit delivered a claimed maximum output of 24 hp (17.6 kW) at 4,000 rpm, which by 1949 had increased to 28 hp at 5000 rpm. The car's aluminium body gave it an excellent power-to-weight ratio and in this form a maximum speed of 110 km/h (68 mph). The Dyna X made a considerable impression in the touring car championships of the late 1940s. The car was also noted for its frugal fuel consumption.

Engine displacement was increased in 1950 to 745 cc, and to 851 cc in 1952, by which time claimed output had increased to 40 hp (29 kW) in the Dyna 130, named for its 130 km/h (81 mph) top speed.

== Running gear ==
The gearbox was a 4-speed manual unit controlled using a column-mounted lever, featuring synchromesh on the top three ratios. Power was transmitted to the front wheels, front wheel drive having been a specialty and an enthusiasm of Grégoire for many years.

== Commercial ==
In July 1948, in a period during which much of the news was gloomy the car received favourable publicity when an enthusiastic customer called Georges Desmoulin, with two friends, drove a standard car to the north of Finland, well within the Arctic Circle, covering long distances on roads which, in the north, were still unpaved. Desmoulin expressed his delight with the comfort and reliability of the car.

Commercially, the Dyna X nevertheless got off to a hesitant start when compared to the Renault 4CV, which appeared around the same time and which would head the French auto sales charts for much of the 1950s, and the Citroen 2CV, which also caught the mood of the market. Crucially, both Renault and Citroen were able to support their sales with a far more extensive national network of dealers and service outlets than that established by Panhard. Sources differ as to the number of Dynas produced: according to a conservative source, by 1954 a respectable 47,049 Dyna X's had been built, including 33,093 of the four-door berlines.

== Devin-Panhard ==
In 1954, a French car dealer in Hollywood found itself with a number of complete Panhard chassis and engines and sold them to racer Bill Devin, who quickly developed a fibreglass roadster body and marketed them as Devin-Panhards. The cars were available fully built or in kit form. Approximately twelve were built. The 750 or 850 cc engines were also available with modified Manx Norton motorcycle cylinder heads. This may have been the first-ever automotive use of belt-driven (double, in this case) overhead camshafts.
