= Paul-Marie Pons =

French naval engineer and civil servant

Paul-Marie Pons (24 June 1904 – 24 October 1966) was a French naval engineer who became a senior civil servant. He is remembered for the Pons Plan which restructured the French automotive industry in the second half of the 1940s.

== Life ==
Born in Longwy, département Meurthe et Moselle, Pons was educated at the prestigious École Polytechnique, then at Paris, (now at Palaiseau on the southern fringes of Paris). After this he pursued a successful career in engineering and management.

In 1927 he married Michèlle Duchez; the marriage was childless.

After the Second World War Pons was appointed to the Ministry of Industrial Production under the direction of the minister, Robert Lacoste. Robert Lacoste had himself been a senior civil servant before the war and had been a member of the French Resistance during the war, after which he re-emerged as a Socialist Deputy and a leading national politician.

He died in Paris.

== The Pons Plan ==
The Pons Plan was conceived in the broader context of the modernisation and reconstruction Plan of the influential economist Jean Monnet who was a firm believer in the benefits of government economic planning. The Pons Plan was for a government devised and directed rationalisation of the French vehicle industry. The plan identified in France 22 manufacturers of passenger cars and 28 manufacturers of trucks. This was considered too many. The plan, applied in a way that some viewed as authoritarian and arbitrary, defined complementary roles for seven of the larger manufacturers: Berliet, Citroën, Ford SAF, Panhard, Peugeot, Renault and Simca.

Citroën and Renault were both considered powerful and large enough to operate autonomously, but Peugeot were required to link up with Hotchkiss, Latil and Saurer for the production of commercial vehicles. In the Lyon region, Berliet was required to form an association with Isobloc and Rochet-Schneider. There were two further groupings of the smaller formerly independently vehicle manufacturers, being the U.F.A (Union Française Automobile) and the G.F.A (Générale Française de l'Automobile), being headed up respectively by Panhard and Simca, and destined to produce just two models between them.

In the French passenger car market, production was divided into three principal sectors according to car size. Citroën, with their existing Traction model, would occupy the upper end of the volume car market. Renault and Peugeot would produce mid-sized cars, leaving the small car market for Panhard and Simca, which would produce two and four door versions of the A.F.G. (Aluminium Français Grégoire), a radical front-wheel drive aluminium based car designed by Jean-Albert Grégoire.

Matters did not work out quite as intended by the Plan. Louis Renault, accused of collaboration, had lost control of his company and died under suspicious circumstances in October 1944, and his business came under the control of well-connected Resistance veteran Pierre Lefaucheux who ignored the Pons Plan. Lefaucheux went ahead with a small car that had been well advanced during the war, which emerged in 1948 as the Renault 4CV. That left Peugeot with the middle-sized cars, while Simca, owned by a foreign company, was also able to escape the model planning of the civil servant. That left Panhard to produce the A.F.G. (Aluminium Français Grégoire) which was later rebranded as the Panhard Dyna X. Citroën used the duration of the plan to further develop the Citroën 2CV that had been started in the 1930s. It was launched in 1948.

Although the larger auto-makers did not entirely follow its strictures, by the time Paul-Marie Pons left his job in November 1946, the vehicle market had been carved up in a way that clearly retained features of the Pons Plan:

=== Passenger cars ===
4 CV
- Panhard Dyna X, Renault 4CV

6 – 8 CV
- Peugeot 203, Simca 8

10 – 12 CV
- Citroën Traction 11 CV

>15 CV
- Citroën Traction 15 CV

Required to concentrate on exports
- Delahaye-Delage, Hotchkiss, Talbot

== Winners and losers ==
The winners were clearly the big four French automakers that dominated the French auto-market in the 1950s and 1960s: Citroën, Renault, Peugeot and Simca.

Panhard, which had concluded the 1930s as the producer of large stylish expensive cars, was reinvented as a volume maker of small cars with aluminium bodies. Aluminium producers had geared up to support aircraft makers who, following the outbreak of peace, were no longer supported by an insatiable demand for fighter planes. In the late 1940s aluminium was therefore available and relatively inexpensive, while the sheet steel which most automakers needed for their car bodies was in desperately short supply. Nevertheless, the Panhard Dyna was not a simple model to produce, nor indeed to maintain, and Panhard lacked the strong dealership and service network across the country that supported the big four auto-makers. In 1949, Panhard produced 4,834 passenger cars, which was no mean achievement under the circumstances, but still derisory when set against the 63,920 cars produced that year by Renault and the 49,424 by Citroën. By comparison, Chevrolet built 180,251 base-trim two door sedans alone in (model year) 1949, so "volume" was relative.

Smaller automakers found the Pons Plan neither as voluntary nor as temporary as some may have anticipated. The luxury auto-makers whose cars were to be targeted at export markets found few buyers in those neighbouring countries where the economy had, as in France, been devastated by war, and even the Swiss auto market was far too small to sustain the luxury brands of France, Britain, Italy and, increasingly as the 1940s rolled into the 1950s, West Germany. North America had plenty of customers willing and able to spend money on new cars, but it also had powerful domestic auto producers, and in volume terms during the early years following the Second World War, at least until Mercedes-Benz made a serious return, imported British producers of luxury and sporting cars tended to outperform other European auto-makers in North America. As the Pons Plan receded into history during the 1950s, any surviving French luxury automakers might have been relieved that their steel supplies were no longer savagely restricted according to government policy, but other policies from the late 1940s that targeted larger cars, notably a punitive annual car tax for any passenger cars with engines larger than approximately 2 litres (coincidentally slightly above the standard engine size for the big Citroëns) endured.

Other major losers from the Pons Plan, barely mentioned in the plan itself, were France's second tier volume automakers. Émile Mathis had been obliged to quit France during the war in response to the racist government policies implemented during the German occupation of France, but he returned in 1946 and invested heavily to restore his Strasbourg factory which had been badly damaged by bombs. Ironically, bombing had been rendered the more damaging because Matthis had handed over the plans of the factory to the Americans in order that they might more effectively destroy what was, during the war, a German manufacturer of military motors and munitions. By 1948, Mathis was exhibiting a modern six cylinder sedan/saloon called the Type 666 at the Paris Motor Show, but for small manufacturers there was nothing optional about the Pons Plan, because government controlled supplies of the raw materials – above all the steel – needed to produce cars. In the end Mathis was forced to abandon his plans to return to auto-making, and the productive assets of his Strasbourg plant were sold to Citroën in 1953. Three years later, Émile Mathis himself died as the result of an accident which involved his falling out of a hotel window in Geneva.

Less combative than Émile Mathis, the directors of Corre La Licorne seem nevertheless to have shared his view that the Pons Plan could be ignored or circumvented once the immediate pressures of post war political interventionism had subsided. Licorne, like Mathis, took a stand at the 1948 Paris Motor Show and exhibited a stylish 14 CV cabriolet. This came a year after the company had presented, the previous year, an elegant 1450cc (8CV) car called the Type 164R. But without government sanctioned steel supplies there was no possibility that the cars could enter production.

Other second tier volume auto-makers that survived the war by producing military supplies, only to find that after the outbreak of peace their return to auto-making was thwarted or stifled by exclusion from the "preferred producers list" of the Pons Plan included Rosengart and Salmson.

== Bibliography ==
- Marc-Antoine Colin, Grégoire, une aventure Hotchkiss (Massin éditeur, 1994), ISBN 2-7072-0233-9.
- Jean-Louis Loubet, L'Industrie automobile française: un cas original?, in: Histoire, Économie et Société (1999), vol. 18, no. 2: La Reconstruction économique de l'Europe (1945–1953), pp. 419–433.
- Paul-Marie Pons, "Un plan quinquennal de l'industrie automobile française", in Les Cahiers politiques, no. 10 (May 1945), pp. 52–64, and no 11 (June 1945), pp. 54–68.
