= Atla (automobile) =

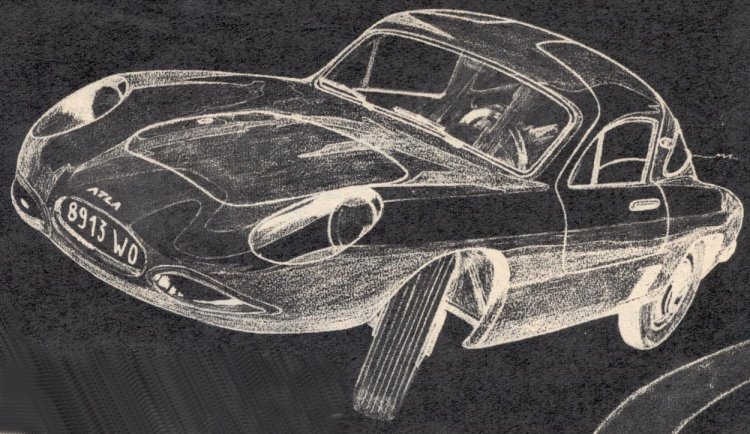
- Sketch of an Atla

Overview
- Production: 1957-1959
- Assembly: France: Garches, Hauts-de-Seine
- Designer: Jacques Durand

Body and chassis
- Class: Sports car
- Body style: 2-door berlinette
- Layout: rear-engine, rear-wheel drive front-engine front-wheel drive
- Doors: Gullwing doors

Powertrain
- Transmission: 3-speed manual 4-speed manual 5-speed manual (optional)

Dimensions
- Wheelbase: 2,200 mm (86.6 in)
- Length: 3,850 mm (151.6 in)
- Width: 1,500 mm (59.1 in)
- Height: 1,250 mm (49.2 in)
- Kerb weight: 495 kg (1,091 lb) (750 Model); 510 kg (1,124 lb) (850 Model)

The Atla is a French automobile that was manufactured from 1957 to 1959 in the commune of Garches in the western suburbs of Paris.

== Background and development ==
The Atla was a project of Jacques Durand, who served as chief designer and assistant engineer. Prior to starting work on the Atla Durand made small-displacement engines for motorized toys and later began using the engines in his own line of scale-models of sports cars like the Jaguar D-Type and the Mercedes-Benz 300SL. In 1957 he visited the workshops of Chappe et Gessalin to see what was involved in producing automobile bodywork in fibreglass and soon progressed to making a body for a full-sized car of his own design. It was Durand who named the car the `Atla' ("A.T.L.A." in some references).

Development of the prototype took place in Durand's workshop in the cellar of his family's home in Antony. This was where the molds that would be used for laying up the fibreglass body were made and the first chassis was fabricated. It is said that Durand had to demolish the staircase going to the basement of the house to get the first car out of the workshop.

Durand designed a small berlinette whose shape drew on cars that he had already produced as scale-models. The Atla's nose was reminiscent of the D-type and it had "portes papillon", or gull-wing doors like those on the 300SL.

The car rode on a custom chassis that was designed for it by an acquaintance of Durand's named Charles Cusson. Cusson engineered a tubular steel space-frame that was very rigid and weighed approximately 40 kg (88.2 lb).

Jean Schwab, who had a Renault dealership in Garches, not only handled sales of the car but also provided the financial support needed to put the car into full production and even supplied some of the necessary Renault parts used in building the car. Robert Jonet, who worked for Schwab, was transferred to the Atla shop full-time to assist in painting and trimming the cars. Schwab, who was a part-time racing driver, used his contacts to have the prototype Atla tested by the French automotive press. The magazine "l'Automobile" featured the car in an in-depth article and on its cover in its Issue 147 of July 1958. Feedback from these evaluations was used by the Atla team to make changes to the car before it went into production.

Production of the car was moved from Durand's workshop in Antony to Garches.

== Atla Renault ==
Powering the car was Renault's Billancourt engine, mounted behind the rear wheels in a rear-engine, rear-wheel drive layout. The Atla could be bought in kit form or as a completed car. Two levels of kit were available. A basic kit included a bare body shell with the doors, hood and rear hatch mounted on hinges and the chassis with all attachment points and cost 250,000 Francs. A more complete kit could be had that included a painted body and an upholstered interior. This kit also came with all handles, a wiring loom and a fuel tank already installed. This version cost 650,000 Francs.

Complete cars were offered in four different versions; two standard and two competition. A completely assembled Atla Type 750 used the 747 cc (46 cu in) version from the Renault 4CV that produced 16 kW (21 hp), and came with a 3-speed manual transaxle. The Atla Type 850 used the 845 cc (52 cu in) engine from the Renault Dauphine that developed 22 kW (30 hp), and also had a 3-speed manual transaxle. The 750 model weighed just 495 kg (1,091.3 lb) and the 850 model was slightly heavier at 510 kg (1,124.4 lb).

The first competition version, called either the Monza or Rally, also had a 750 cc engine but came with a 4-speed manual transaxle. The highest performance version was called the Sebring, and it came with an 850 cc engine and a 4-speed manual transaxle. A 5-speed transaxle was an option. Engines in the Monza/Rally and Sebring models were tuned by Autobleu and received Solex 32mm carburetors, performance camshafts, larger valves and new valve springs, modified cylinder heads and custom exhaust systems. These changes raised power output for the 750 to 24 kW (32 hp) and as much as 30 kW (40 hp) for the 850. The competition cars were slightly heavier than the standard cars.

== Atla Panhard ==
At least one car was built with Atla bodywork and the air-cooled boxer-twin engine and transaxle from a Panhard Dyna Z in a front-engine, front-wheel-drive configuration. Apart from that the number built and attribution of the Atla Panhard is debated.

Some references say that the Panhard drive-train was a factory option, and that six cars were built by them at a second assembly location in Malakoff.

Others report that only one such car was built at the request of one specific customer. Uncorroborated claims have been made that it was built by another company and used the Atla body but a chassis from another car. An Atla Panhard was reported to be in the United States for several years before being repatriated to France.

== Release to end of production ==
The prototype was complete by 1957 and the car went into production the next year. The Type 750 was priced at 860,000 Francs and the Type 850 cost 950,000 Francs. At a time when a Renault 4CV cost 419,000 Francs, a Dauphine 574,000 Francs and the larger Frégate 929,000 Francs the Atla was competitively positioned in the market.

After sales of about 20 cars the factory reviewed their production costs and increased the price of the car significantly, to 1,000,000 Francs. This major price increase caused orders to essentially stop, crippling the finances of the company. Production of the Atla ended shortly after, having only been built for little over one year. The total number of Atlas built is estimated to have been fewer than thirty cars.

After the Atla project ended Durand went on to design several other cars, the first of which was the Sera. He and Cusson also partnered on another short-lived car project called the ALPA years later.

== Atla in motorsports ==
An Atla made several appearances in the short film "Au Rallye de Genève" of 1959.

An Atla-Renault was raced for several seasons in Sweden.

== Literature ==
- Fournier, Jean-Luc (2005). Les créations automobiles de Jacques Durand Tome 1. Association les Bielles Doo-Wap.
- "unknown". L'Automobile (in French). July 1958.
- Jidéhem (30 September 1958). "2 réalisations françaises en plastique". Spirou (in French). No. 1072. p. 24.
- "unknown". Gazoline (in French). 2003.
- Bellu, René. AutOmobilia HS n°21, Toutes les voitures françaises 1959, salon 1959.
