= Sera (automobile) =

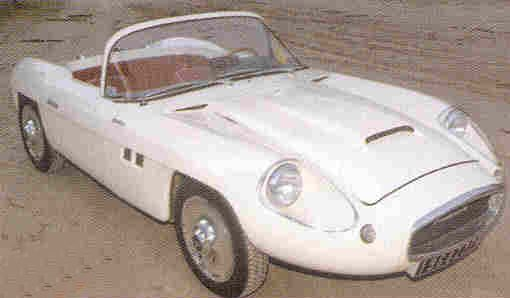
- Sera convertible

Overview
- Manufacturer: SERA SA
- Production: 1959-1961
- Assembly: France; Spain
- Designer: Jacques Durand

Body and chassis
- Class: Sports car
- Body style: 2-door convertible
- Layout: Front-engine, front-wheel drive

Powertrain
- Engine: 848 cc (51.7 cu in) air-cooled 2-cylinder boxer
- Transmission: 4-speed manual

Dimensions
- Wheelbase: 2,250 mm (88.6 in)
- Length: 3,940 mm (155.1 in)
- Width: 1,550 mm (61.0 in)
- Height: 1,160 mm (45.7 in)
- Kerb weight: 550–580 kg (1,213–1,279 lb)

The Sera is a small sports car built in France from 1959 to 1961. A few cars were also built in Spain.

== Background ==
The name of the company that built the car was SERA SA, an acronym for "Société d'Études et de Réalisations Automobiles, Société Anonyme". This was not the SERA-CD company founded by Charles Deutsch, whose full company name was "Société d'Études et de Réalisations Automobiles - Charles Deutsch". The company that built the Sera was founded by M.G. Rey and was based in Porte de Villiers, Paris. Some references indicate that French industrialist François Arbel, who had been one of the principals behind the second iteration of the Symétric hybrid prototype, was involved in the project and was instrumental in bringing Jacques Durand in to do the design.

== Features and specifications ==
Durand's design for the Sera was a stylish 2-seat convertible. A removable hardtop was optional. The Sera incorporated parts from other vehicles. The windshield, for instance, was from the Simca Aronde Océane, the taillights were from the Panhard PL 17 and the backlight in the removable hardtop was from the Citroën DS.

The Sera weighed less than 600 kilograms (1,300 lb) and was designed around a backbone chassis with a power-train and running gear sourced from Panhard. The engine was a two-cylinder boxer twin that could be had in 42 hp (31.3 kW) standard or 50 hp (37.3 kW) "Tigre" versions, with the latter able to propel the car up to a top speed of 160 km/h (99.4 mph). The engine drove the front-wheels through a 4-speed manual transaxle from the Panhard Dyna Z.

== Production history ==
Five cars were built in preparation for the car's official unveiling at the 1959 Paris Auto Salon. SERA was unable to secure a stand at the show and so improvised a display of the car outside of the pavilion where the show was held. The car was priced at 14,000 francs. Eight more cars were built in a facility in the 17th arrondissement of Paris before production was moved to the former Motobloc factory in Bordeaux where 15 more cars were built before the factory shut down in January 1961.

One of the Bordeaux Seras was exhibited at a fair in Barcelona which elicited a proposal to build the car in Spain. This resulted in Durand relocating to Tarragona to restart Sera production there. Import restrictions imposed by the Franco government made it impossible to obtain the French Panhard components needed to complete the cars. One Spanish-built Sera was completed with a three-cylinder two-stroke DKW engine in a front-wheel drive layout and a second car was fitted with a Fiat engine in a front-engine, rear-wheel drive configuration before the endeavour collapsed.

A Sera fixed-head coupé has been displayed both prior to and following a full restoration. It is not known if this car is in its original configuration as the shape of the greenhouse is very reminiscent of the later Arista also designed by Durand.
