= Pichon-Parat =

French coachbuilder

- Type: Carrosserie
- Industry: Automotives
- Founded: 25 February 1952; 74 years ago in Sens, France
- Founders: Bernard Pichon; André Parat
- Defunct: 30 November 1983
- Fate: Deregistered
- Headquarters: Sens, France

Pichon-Parat was a French carrosserie based in the commune of Sens, in the department of Yonne. Established in 1952, it was known for producing custom cabriolet, coupé, estate car, and shooting brake conversions of established models from major automakers, and for building their own distinctive sporting models with completely original bodywork.

== History ==
The company was founded by Bernard Pichon and André Parat. Pichon was born on 28 April 1923, and Parat eleven days later on 9 May 1923. Both families settled in Sens and the two boys became close friends while still very young. Pichon, whose family was wealthier, began drawing cars while still in school. Later he trained as a lathe-operator before buying a truck and working in transportation, then decided to pursue automobile design full time in 1950. Parat trained as a boilermaker and obtained his welder's ticket.

The two men started working on automobile conversions together. Some of their earliest work involved converting large American cars into utility vehicles.

In 1949 the pair designed and built a custom coupé version of the Ford Vedette sedan.

They booked a booth at the 1951 Paris Salon de l'Auto to display their conversions.

In 1952 the two partners formally established their carrosserie in Sens. Originally located at 73 rue du Général Leclerc, the company later moved to 39 rue Mocquesouris, where their factory was a rustic collection of buildings around a central courtyard where chickens roamed.

The name of the company was Pichon & Parat, although the hyphenated form Pichon-Parat was commonly used, and some badging reads Pichon Parat Sens. The company was also at times referred to by its location as Sens or Sénonais, in the same way that Citroën was known as Quai de Javel, and Panhard as Porte d’Ivry.

After being selected by Raymond Loewy to build his design for a custom bodied BMW 507, the company went on to do several projects with the Franco-American designer, producing bodywork for Loewy designs based on cars from Cadillac, Jaguar, and Studebaker.

Pichon left the company in 1960. For a time he worked for Antonio Lago, and by 1962 had become an inspector in Fiat's public works division. Parat continued to run the carrosserie himself, while Pichon remained in touch and would send work to his former partner. The two men continued to collaborate on some projects, including their original four-headlamp conversion for the Citroën DS/ID that appeared in 1964 — three years ahead of Citroën's own "Nouveau visage" restyling of the car.

In the mid-1960s, Panhard encouraged Parat to merge with Monopole Poissy, and move to the engine parts supplier's larger facilities in Poissy, but this merger never took place. Parat also turned down an offer from Loewy to move to the US, and an overture from Enzo Ferrari to become the Italian's East France division and workshop, preferring in all cases to maintain his independence. The company did become a distributor of Sterckeman caravans. Coachbuilding activities from this point on almost ceased, making the resumption of estate car building in the late 1970s noteworthy.

On 1 January 1971, Parat relocated operations to Route de Lyon in Sens. Two years later he stopped building coachwork to concentrate exclusively on boiler-making and auto repairs.

On 19 June 1979 Bernard Pichon died at the Ambroise Paré Hospital in Boulogne Billancourt.

The Pichon & Parat company was removed from French corporate registers on 30 November 1983.

André Parat was killed in a road accident on 24 November 1995.

== Projects ==
=== Bugatti ===
Shortly after the end of World War II (WWII) Pichon-Parat created a body for a Bugatti Type 49 Roadster (chassis 49481) built in the Gangloff style.

A Bugatti Type 57 Stelvio, chassis number 57314, was bought new in 1935 by a Monsieur Dettwiller. Fifteen years later Detwiller inquired about buying a Type 101, but was told that the new model was not yet available. Dettwiller and Pierre Marco of Bugatti came to an agreement whereby Detwiller's Type 57 would receive a new chassis frame (#57314-2) and a Type 101 engine, while the original body would be retained but updated with, among other changes, a Type 101 radiator grille. Pichon-Parat handled the revisions to the bodywork. In 1987 owner C. Richards had the car restored by Barry Price, who returned the car to its original appearance, undoing the changes made by Pichon-Parat.

=== Ford Vedette ===
In a special October 1950 show issue of the magazine L'Action Automobile et Touristique (AAT), a coupé conversion of a Ford Vedette sedan by Pichon-Parat was featured alongside work from other coachbuilders, including Franay, Guilloré, Saoutchik and Figoni et Falaschi. The change converted the two-box factory sedan into a three-box shape. A revised version of the Vedette coupé with a panoramic backlite appeared on their stand at the 1951 Salon de l'Auto in Paris. Eventually the company would produce just short of 300 Vedette conversions, with body styles that included variations on the original coupé as well as estate cars, convertibles and modified sedans, including a convertible sedan.

=== Renault 4CV ===
Also on the Pichon-Parat stand at the Grand Palais in 1951 was a coupé based on the Renault 4CV Grand Luxe.

=== Renault Frégate ===
In 1952 Pichon-Parat became the first carrosserie to build and show a 2-door convertible version of the Renault Frégate.

The first iteration of the design, seen early in 1952, was a simple roofless conversion of the hardtop sedan with a horizontal bar grille and an air intake added to the hood. A later version displayed in October replaced the earlier wide grille with a narrower chrome escutcheon and added extensive chrome detailing along the car's sides. Pichon-Parat did not pursue production of this project, instead turning their attention to modified Panhards.

=== Citroën 15/6 ===
In 1952 Pichon-Parat built a customized Citroën Traction Avant, based on a 1949 six-cylinder 15/6 model. Changes to the interior included adding a gear change on the steering wheel and a radio. On the exterior, only the original roof and rear door panels were retained. The headlamps were integrated into the front wings and air vents were added. The new rear fenders were very similar to those of the Renault Frégate.

=== Peugeot 203 ===
The carrosserie built a special lightweight Peugeot 203, with body panels of duralumin, that Parat personally drove in the 1953 Liège–Rome–Liège rallye.

=== Dyna Junior ===
After observing the performance of the Panhard Dyna's during the Liège–Rome–Liège rallye, Parat and company began building what would eventually be a run of about thirty copies of a fixed-head coupé version of the Panhard Dyna Junior beginning in 1953. The mechanical aspects were carried over from the Panhard and, apart from the roof, the carrosserie's coupé followed the original's appearance closely.

=== Pichon-Parat Dolomite ===
As a follow-on to their Dyna Junior coupés, in 1954 the company unveiled a new berlinette model, called the Dolomite, with a more streamlined body.

While one car was built on a DB chassis, the rest of the Dolomites were built on chassis from either a Panhard Dyna X or Junior, new or used, depending on the customer's wishes. Power came from a Panhard flat-twin of either 750 cc (45.8 cu in) or 850 cc (51.9 cu in). About 60 of these cars were built starting in 1954 and continuing until 1956.

Dolomites were raced at several major events, including the Bol d’Or in 1954, the Tour de Corse in 1955 and 1956, the Mille Miglia in 1956 and 1957, as well as at Mont Ventoux, Lyon-Charbonnières and others. The cars achieved some class wins.

The original berlinette was followed by a cabriolet in 1956.

=== Salmson 2300S ===
During the years 1953 and 1954 Pichon-Parat built three cars (some references say just two) based on the Salmson 2300S. The second and third car in the series were named Pichon-Parat Salmson 2300GS.

The Salmson came with a 2,328 cc (142.1 cu in) aluminium DOHC straight-four engine fed by a Solex 35/40 double barrel carburetor, and producing 110 hp (82.0 kW). Transmission options included a Cotal preselector gearbox or an optional ZF manual transmission. The front suspension was independent with upper and lower wishbones, longitudinal torsion bars, telescopic dampers, and hydraulic drum brakes. In the rear was a live axle suspended on semi-elliptic leaf springs with telescopic dampers. Steering was by either rack-and-pinion or worm-and-sector.

The first Pichon-Parat Salmson car, which is not always included in the histories, was similar in appearance to a larger version of the Panhard Dolomite coupés.

The second car was shown at the 1954 Paris Motor Show. With a berlinette body made of aluminium, it weighed just 1,000 kg (2,205 lb), 230 kg (507 lb) less than the original Salmson. The wide original front air intake was later reshaped to deal with cooling problems encountered by owner René Cotton. Cotton raced the car, registered as 1265 DL 75, at Monte Carlo, the Coupe des Alpes, the Liège-Rome-Liège, and the Lyon Charbonnières. The car was eventually abandoned and later scrapped.

The third Salmson bodied by the Sens carrosserie was also a berlinette, but one whose wheelbase had been reduced from the original 2,680 mm (105.5 in) to 2,350 mm (92.5 in). Other features of this car included an aluminium body painted Ile de France blue, a competition Borgward 4-speed gearbox, and Rudge wheels and brake drums. It was sold to an owner only known as "Vincent" for 7500 New Francs. Rediscovered in 1956, the car disappeared again by the end of the 1950s.

=== Guépard ===
André Delacourt's Société d'Etude et de Recherches (S.E.R.) commissioned the construction of two Renault-powered specials that appeared in 1954. The first car was built for René Paris, and the second for Paul Bobet. Power came from a Renault 4 CV Type 662-2 engine block with a big-valve R1063 cylinder head, Solex carburettor, and sports exhaust. The rear wheels were driven through a 5-speed gearbox from André-Georges Claude. Pichon-Parat produced the original aluminium barquette bodies. The cars were homologated as Guépards (Cheetahs).

Both cars appeared at the 1954 Bol d'Or, numbered 76 and 77 respectively. The car driven by Paris did not finish, while Bobet's finished twenty-second out of twenty-six classified. Bobet later had his car rebodied with an extremely aerodynamic shape designed by Marcel Riffard and fabricated by Heuliez. This restyled car was renamed the Riffard-Renault in 1956.

=== Delage D6 3 Litre ===
In 1955 Pichon-Parat rebodied a Delage D6 3 Litre racing car.

The Delage D6 3L was powered by a supercharged 3.0 L (183.1 cu in) inline six cylinder engine. Fed by three Solex carburettors, it produced 142 bhp (105.9 kW) at 5300 rpm. The ladder chassis had a wheelbase of 106.3 in (2,700 mm), and was suspended on upper and lower wishbones and transverse leaf springs in front, and a live axle with semi-elliptic leaf springs in back. Friction dampers were used at all four corners. Five cars were built.

One car, Chassis 880004, was bought new in 1947 by Henri Louveau, and from 1948 to 1950 it appeared in several endurance racing events, taking second place at the 24 Hours of Le Mans, the Spa 24 Hours, and the 12 Hours of Paris. In 1953 the car was bought by Jacques Nollé, who commissioned Pichon-Parat to rebody the car as a coupé. The body that resulted was a long-nosed coupé with short, sharply peaked tailfins.

Shortly after buying the car in 1995, new owner Peter Mullin had it restored it to its original 1947 racing configuration by Auto Classique Touraine of Tours, France.

=== Pichon-Parat Izoard 4CV ===
The Col d'Izoard is a mountain pass in the Alps. In 1955 Pichon-Parat unveiled the Izoard Pichon-Parat 4CV; a sports car with a body designed by Pichon and built on the Renault 4CV platform. The original two-door berlinette had gullwing doors and aluminium bodywork.

The car was raced in various rallies and appeared in the 1956 Mille Miglia.

In 1956 a cabriolet version was launched.

=== Lancia Aurelia B20 GT ===
In early 1956 Pichon-Parat presented a styling exercise built on the unibody chassis of a Lancia Aurelia B20 GT. Reaction to the two-door berlinette with its quad-headlamp nose was mixed.

=== Talbot-Lago ===
In an effort to revive the fortunes of his struggling Talbot-Lago company, Antonio Lago commissioned the construction of a new barquette for Le Mans. For the 1956 race two cars were built on the Talbot-Lago T14 LS chassis. Power for the cars came from the same Maserati inline six used in the Maserati 250F. Bore and stroke were 84 mm × 75 mm (3.3 in × 3.0 in) for a total displacement of 2,494 cc (152.2 cu in). Pichon-Parat provided the bodywork.

The two barquettes were entered for Le Mans in 1956, with one car driven by the team of Louis Rosier and Jean Behra, and the other by Geoffredo Zehender and Jean Lucas. Neither car finished. In 1957 the cars were entered with Franco Bordoni and Georges Burggraff listed as drivers in one and Bruce Halford and Franco Bordoni in the other. The Bordoni/Burggraff car did not start, and the Halford/Bordoni car retired with gearbox trouble.

A collection of Talbot-Lago parts, including six T14 chassis, bodies, and parts for Talbot's BMW V8-powered America models, were bought by racing driver George Grignard. In 1979 this collection was sold to Dominique Dupont, who built one Le Mans 2500 replica for himself and sold the other five chassis off to be built by their new owners. These cars became known as the Dupont Barquettes.

=== Simca Aronde ===
In 1956 a new coupé from the Sénonais carrosserie was on their stand at Paris. This car was based on the Simca Aronde platform. The car had a panoramic windshield and concave rear lines. It was featured on the cover of the December 1956 issue of l'Automobile magazine.

The project did not get any support from Simca, who would later release their "Plein Ciel" model built by Facel Metallon. The show car was believed to have been destroyed in a road accident.

=== BMW 507 ===
Raymond Loewy saw the 4CV-based cabriolet and Aronde-based coupé on the Pichon-Parat stand in 1956, and asked Pichon if he could produce a body for a car to his exact specifications. This meeting led to Pichon-Parat being hired to build a body designed by Loewy on the base of a V8-powered BMW 507, chassis number 70.024. Some features of the two-seat coupé that resulted foreshadowed Loewy's later work, including the Studebaker Avanti.

=== Peugeot 403 ===
At the Paris Salon de l'Auto in 1957, Pichon-Parat displayed a Peugeot 403 coupé. This car had a lowered roof, and a panoramic windscreen and backlite. The coachworks had also removed the B pillars, which were structural and the absence of which resulted in increased chassis flex that caused the side doors to jam. The car was destroyed after the show.

=== Pichon-Parat Pipat-kart ===
Something that Pichon encountered during his time in the US, and that he brought back home with him, was Kart racing, which was then unknown in France. The first Pichon-Parat kart appeared in 1957. It was made using a tubular steel chassis, Vespa wheels and an engine from a chainsaw. Development proceeded quickly, and soon the karts from Sens were using two-stroke engines from tillers or even motorcycles. Pichon-Parat's Pipat-karts were sold, with or without an engine, throughout France.

=== Panhard Dyna Z ===
As early as 1953 Pichon-Parat released a coupé version of the Panhard Dyna Z sedan.

The company developed an estate car conversion for the Panhard Dyna Z that was first seen in 1956, then revised in 1957 and again in 1958. The rear end and tailgate were sourced from the Peugeot 403 Familiale.

Another car on the company's stand at the 1958 Paris Auto Show was a Panhard Dyna convertible dubbed "Bordeaux". This car was distinguished by shrouded headlamps and a mesh grille that stretched the full width of the nose and curved up and over a stylized version of the original Panhard Dyna air intake. This car was the result of a joint venture between Pichon-Parat and the Bordeaux-based coachbuilder Vivez. Designed by Bernard Pichon, ten copies of the "Bordeaux" were to have been produced under license by Vivez.

=== Cadillac Coupe de Ville ===
Another Pichon-Parat project for Raymond Loewy was a 1959 Cadillac Coupe de Ville, VIN 59J088977. The car was bought new. Pichon and staff spent a weekend at Loewy's country house in the Chevreuse valley, where Loewy indicated his desired changes by having the car wrapped in paper and writing on it with a felt-tip pen. Shipped to Sens, the car was ready in just a few weeks. After its completion the Cadillac was shown at the 1959 Paris Auto Show. Loewy and his family drove the car in Europe, then shipped it back to California. Loewy sold the car in 1970.

=== Vespa 400 ===
The same year that Pichon-Parat completed Loewy's Cadillac project, they released a design on the opposite end of the automotive size scale; the Vespa 400 Esterel of 1959. Six or seven of this tiny beach car are said to have been built.

The Esterel is powered by a rear mounted 2-stroke 400 cc (24.4 cu in) engine developing 14 hp (10.4 kW). Suspension is fully independent. The interior uses water-resistance rattan or plastic upholstery, with sun protection provided by a removable canopy.

=== Cabriolet Pichon-Parat Tigre ===
At the 1960 Paris Auto Show the company showed a small cabriolet based on the Panhard PL 17 and built on the same shortened chassis as the Tigre Z Sports. The car had no engine or electrical system, and would remain unfinished and in storage at the factory for thirty years, until it was bought by an enthusiast, who installed a Panhard Tigre engine.

=== Oldsmobile 98 ===
The coachbuilder was commissioned by Robert Dhéry to create a customized car to be the title character in the 1961 movie "La Belle Américaine". Although in the movie it is referred to as a "Cadillac", the movie car is a modified 1959 Oldsmobile 98 convertible. Apart from the bodywork, several special gadgets were added to the car for use in the movie.

=== Citroën DS/ID ===
In late 1964, Pichon-Parat presented a DS with a quad headlamp conversion, three years ahead of Citroën. The conversion consisted of new front wings reshaped to accept the Cibié headlamp assemblies used on the Panhard 24, and only required one day's work by the coachbuilder. About 300 of these conversions were done.

The company then went on to apply this new front end to a short wheelbase DS/ID coupé they developed and released in 1965. Although not a major success in sales, Citroën's competition department later had Pichon-Parat build them shortened, two-door versions of the DS for racing.

The carrosserie also considered producing a model with a shortened ID chassis powered by a Panhard flat twin engine, but the launch of Panhard's own 24CT eliminated the market window for this design.

=== Studebaker ===
Following the success of Loewy's Avanti coupé, Studebaker commissioned his firm to create new designs for four-door models. Loewy sent designers John Ebstein and Bob Andrews to France to produce the new shapes. In six weeks they had produced two proposals; a notchback and a fastback. On 12 April 1962 approval was given for both to be produced as prototypes, with the fastback scheduled to be delivered in October that same year. Pichon-Parat built the bodies for both using stock Studebaker chassis, running gear, and drivetrains.

The cars were displayed at Studebaker's South Bend, Indiana location, and then moved when the company relocated to Youngstown, Ohio. After that the cars' location was unclear until they were rediscovered in 2010.

=== Jaguar E-Type ===
Pichon-Parat were involved in modifying at least two Jaguar E-Type coupés.

The first was a 1966 Jaguar 4.2 Litre Series 1, chassis no. 1E30635, that became Loewy's personal car. Work started in 1965. Changes to the bodywork, executed by Pichon-Parat, included shortening the nose by 25 cm (9.8 in) and the tail by 12 cm (4.7 in), adding quad headlamps and a new, larger, oval grille opening, replacing the original Jaguar taillamps with Frenched in units from the Chevrolet Corvair, and adding a transparent spoiler across the trailing edge of the roof.

The second E-Type was a car whose changes consisted mainly of having its nose extended by 97 cm (38.2 in). It was featured in the 1968 movie "Le Petit Baigneur".

=== Matra MS620 ===
In 1966 Matra unveiled their first Group 6 car and second ever racing sports car — the Matra MS620. The car featured a 1.9 litre BRM V8 engine capable of producing 245 hp (182.7 kW) at 9,000 rpm. The tubular steel chassis was designed by Bernard Boyer, formerly of Alpine, and the berlinette bodywork by Pichon-Parat. Four cars were built.

The cars first appeared at the Le Mans test in 1966. Their best finish was a win at Magny-Cours and a second at the Coup-de-Paris. Their last appearance was at the 1967 Le Mans test.

=== Ligier JS2 ===
French industrialist and racing car driver Guy Ligier established Ligier Automobiles to build the kind of car that he and late driving partner Jo Schlesser had planned together. Ligier's first car was the Ligier JS1, a two-seat mid-engined coupé with a body styled by Pietro Frua. The car was named to honour Schlesser.

The JS2 was a follow-on to the JS1, with a new Maserati-built DOHC V6 shared with the Citroën SM. Pichon-Parat updated Frua's design for the JS1, revising the nose, reshaping the luggage space, and changing the taillamps. They also had to make changes to accommodate the Maserati engine.

=== Peugeot 604 ===
In a 1977 return to activity the coachbuilder presented a Peugeot 604 station wagon, only two of which were built. One was used by driver Bernard Consten.

=== BMW 1800/2000 ===
Shortly after establishing their French operation in Brumath near Strasbourg, BMW contracted Pichon-Parat to produce a limited series of estate cars built on the Munich manufacturer's BMW 1800 or 2000 base. At twice the price of a Peugeot 404 Super Luxe station wagon, few were sold."

=== Other conversions ===
Pichon-Parat continued to offer estate car conversions as late as 1980 on models such as the Renault 30 TS and the BMW 7 Series.
