= Panhard 24 =

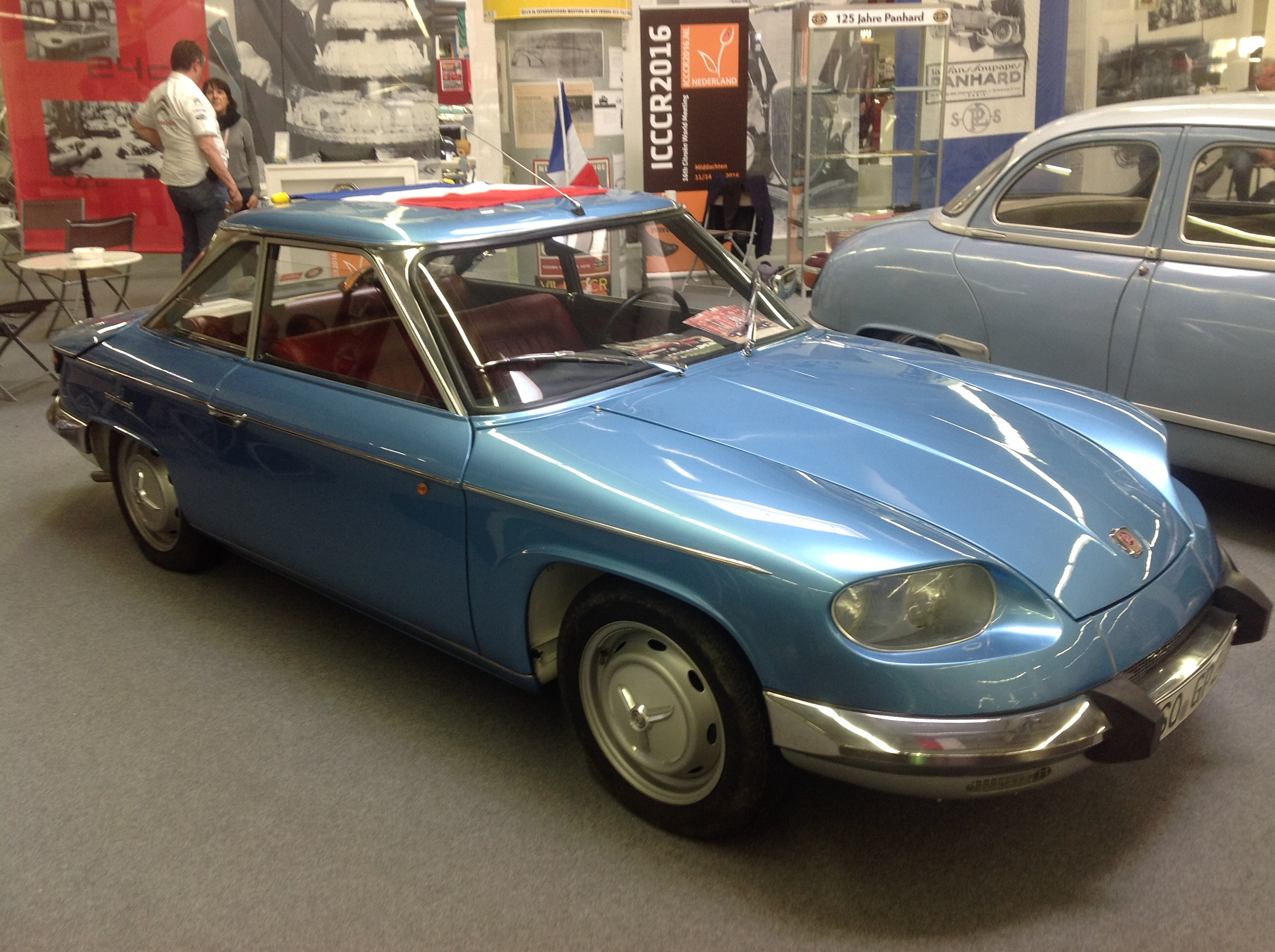

Overview
- Manufacturer: Société des Anciens Etablissements Panhard et Levassor
- Production: 1964–1967; 28,651 produced
- Designer: Louis Bionier

Body and chassis
- Class: Mid-size
- Body style: 2-door coupé 2-door sedan
- Layout: Front-engine, front-wheel-drive

Powertrain
- Engine: 848 cc (51.75 cu in) H2
- Transmission: 4-speed manual

Dimensions
- Wheelbase: 2,286 mm (90.0 in) (short); 2,550 mm (100.4 in) (long)
- Length: 4,267 mm (168.0 in) (short); 4,550 mm (179.1 in) (long)
- Width: 1,620 mm (63.8 in)
- Height: 1,220 mm (48.0 in)
- Curb weight: 840 kg (1,852 lb) (approx)

Chronology
- Predecessor: Panhard PL 17
- Successor: Citroën GS

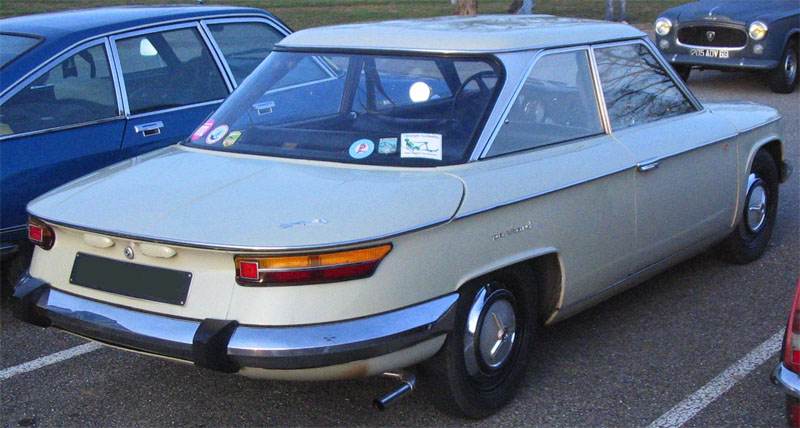
The Panhard 24 BT provided more than 25 cm (9.8 in) of extra leg space for the back seat passengers

The Panhard 24 is a compact two-door coupé produced from 1964 to 1967 by French automaker Panhard. It is powered by a front-mounted air-cooled boxer-twin engine whose basic design dates back to the 1940s. In 1965, an extended-wheelbase version was launched that was promoted as a two-door four- or five-seat saloon. The Panhard 24 was the last automobile produced by Panhard—from 1967 on the company has focused on manufacturing light military vehicles.

== Background ==
In 1955, Citroën acquired a 25 percent share of Panhard's automobile business, and over the next two years the national dealership networks of the two brands were integrated. This gave both Citroën and Panhard dealers the ability to offer a small car (Citroën 2CV), a medium-sized saloon (Panhard Dyna Z), and a large car range (Citroën DS). The integration of the sales and service networks energised sales of the Dyna Z and of its successor, the Panhard PL 17.

More importantly for Citroën, they acquired desperately needed production capacity at Panhard's plant in the 13th arrondissement of Paris, which from then on produced Citroën 2CV Fourgonettes (light vans) alongside Panhard sedans.

During the late 1950s, the Citroën DS range was extended downmarket with the aggressively priced Citroën ID. 1961 saw the launch of the Citroën Ami, essentially a modernised, upmarket version of the 2CV.

Panhard's plans to upgrade their popular PL 17 faced strong opposition from Citroën president Pierre Bercot, who objected to any new model that might intrude in any market segment where Citroën had an existing or planned presence of their own. This may explain why the roomy four-door PL 17 found itself replaced by a coupé design in the form of the Panhard 24. The Panhard design team's proposal to fit the 24 with a four-cylinder engine was also rejected in favour of the existing Panhard two-cylinder unit, for reasons of cost.

Plans for a four-door 24 sedan and a five-door estate version, which would have made the car a more comparable replacement for the PL 17, were also stymied, even though styling models for both were built, as was a concept for a cabriolet.

== Features ==
=== Body ===
The styling of the 24 was well received by the automotive press. The car featured a low, modern body line with a prominent raised beltline reminiscent of the then fashionable Chevrolet Corvair. At a time when monocoque construction was becoming mainstream, the 24 sat on a separate tubular steel chassis, making it possible, even using the economically available materials of the time, to keep the window pillars relatively thin, resulting in an airy cabin and good all-round visibility. The structural rigidity of the body was further enhanced by pleating and reinforcing of the roof panel. Tubular steel front and rear subframes were bolted to a chassis that comprised the floor and the flat steel sidemembers. Under the skin, the structural architecture was little changed from that of the Dyna 54.

Although the basic engine had changed little since 1948, the lack of a radiator and the low profile of the flat-twin engine made it possible for Panhard to achieve a low, streamlined front end that followed contemporary styling trends. Citroën's DS, constrained by the taller profile of its upright inline four, achieved a similarly wind-cheating front profile only by moving the engine some forty centimetres back from the front of the car. (Note: The DS19 had essentially the same drivetrain as the Traction Avant, using the same front-wheel-drive layout with the engine set directly behind the front wheels and the clutch and gearbox ahead of the engine.)

The Panhard 24 incorporated twin headlamps recessed into the nose of the car under a transparent cover, a styling motif that was adopted by the Citroën DS in 1967. The stainless steel front bumpers / fenders, each in three sections to facilitate replacement, were integrated into the body line in a way that reduced drag.

=== Interior ===
The front seatbacks of the 24 were adjustable for rake, and the seats were adjustable for height – unusual at the time. Seat belts were offered as an option. The passenger's sun visor included a vanity mirror with its own light, and the steering wheel was adjustable. The car featured a heating and ventilation system with front and rear windscreen demisters.

A much more basic version, the 24 BA, was briefly offered in 1966: only 161 were built.

=== Engine ===
Although the Panhard 24 had a new modern body, its 848 cc two-cylinder air-cooled boxer engine harkened back to the engine in the Panhard Dyna X of 1952, which was itself an enlarged version of Panhard's 610 cc boxer first seen in 1947. By 1954, when it appeared in the newly announced Dyna Z, this engine produced a claimed output of 42 or 50 CV (31 or 37 kW), depending the level of tune, and it was with these two options that the engine soldiered on in both the PL 17 and in the 24. The engine is compact and efficient, but had originally been developed for lightweight aluminium-bodied cars. By the 1960s, it was no longer economically practical to make cars in this price range out of aluminium, and while the Panhard 24 was not overweight, it was heavier than earlier Panhard saloons. Claimed maximum speeds ranged from 135 km/h (84 mph) for the long-wheelbase 42 CV Panhard 24 to 150 km/h (93 mph) for the short-wheelbase 50 CV version, while a slightly faster Tiger 10 S-engined version was reportedly capable of 160 km/h (99 mph). The 24's performance was adequate, but unremarkable for a car with its sporty image. Additionally, the 24's air-cooled flat-twin engine felt strained when compared to the power delivery offered by the four-cylinder water-cooled powerplants on which the contemporary European auto industry was increasingly standardising for the middle market.

=== Running gear ===
Also familiar from a succession of post-war Panhard saloons were the 24's four-speed all-synchromesh gearbox and front-wheel-drive configuration. Steering was by rack and pinion. The wheels were independently suspended with telescopic shock absorbers and a torsion bar for the rear axle.

The finned drum brakes that the early 24s were fitted with were exposed, and also served as the center of the wheels. These drew criticism for inadequate stopping power and excessive vibration. After 1965, the 24BT and 24CT received front disc brakes.

== Chronology ==
The car's press launch took place on 23 June 1963. A Panhard 24 CT was presented in two-tone plum and grey, although the special paintwork would not be a regular feature of production models. The presentation took place in a large garden near Montlhéry, with a backdrop of antique statues and rose bushes, complemented by imaginative lighting effects.

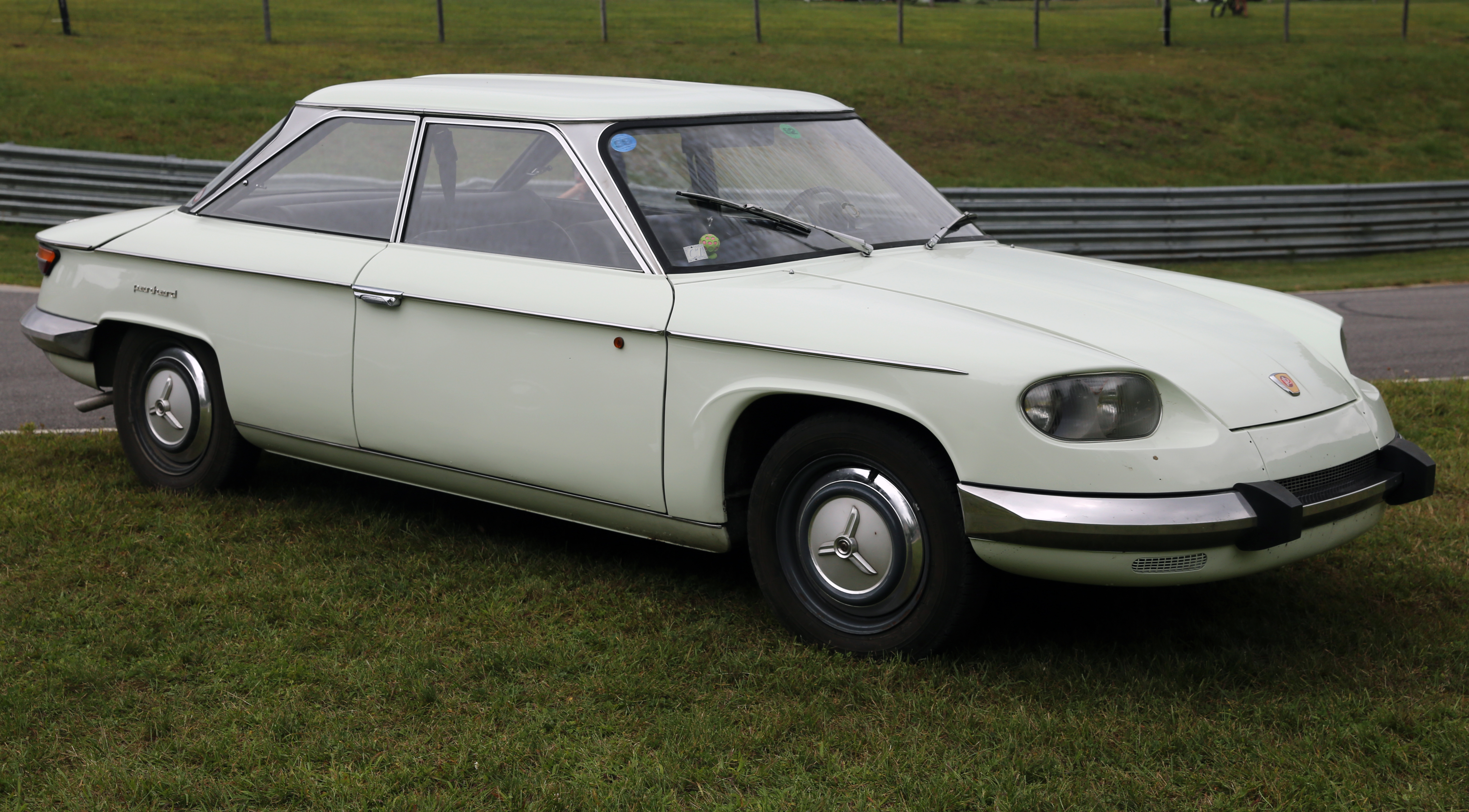
1967 Panhard 24BT, the long wheelbase version

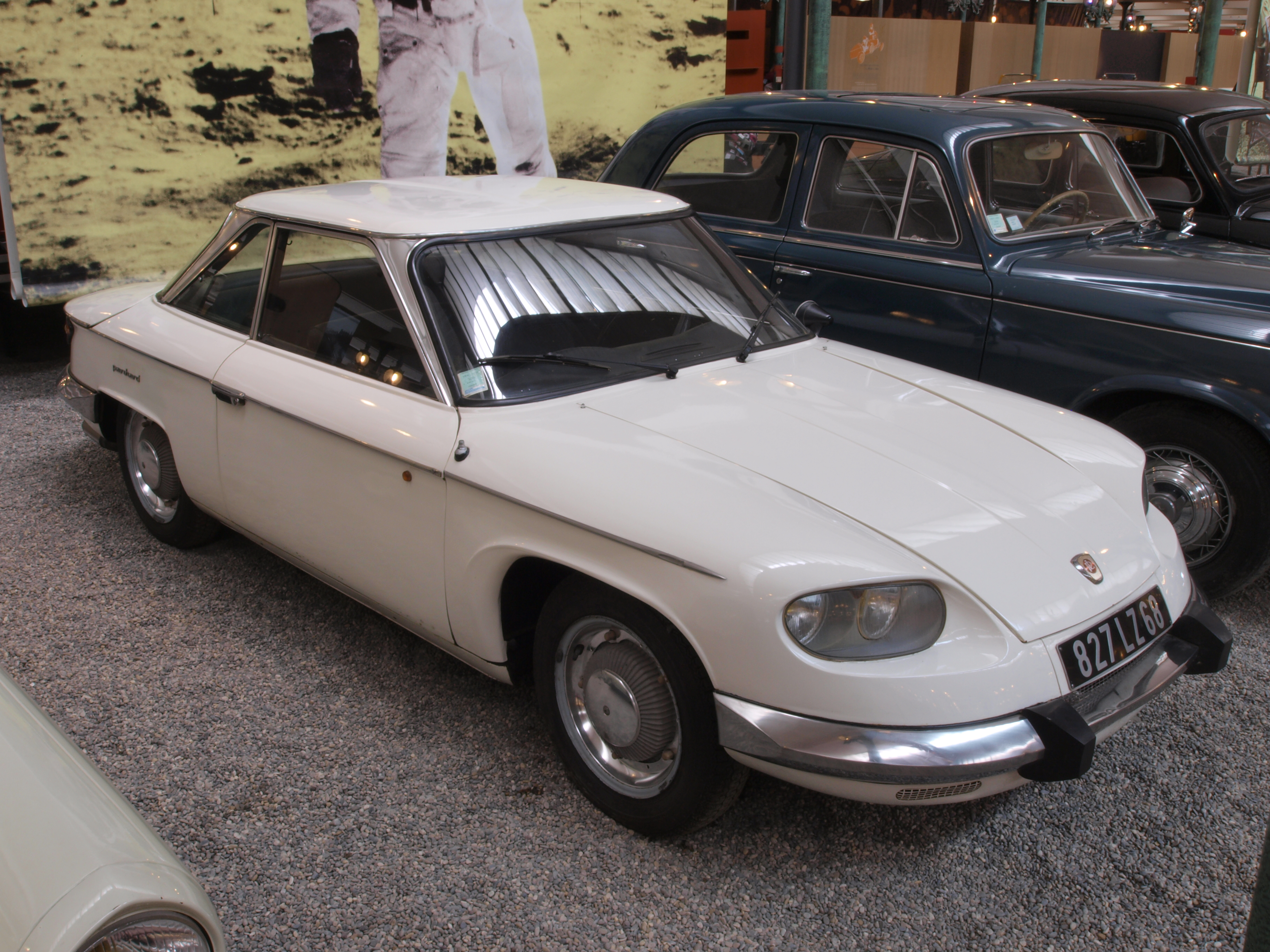
1964 Panhard 24CT, the short wheelbase version

In 1964, two versions were offered; the 24 C and the 24 CT. These were promoted respectively as a four-seater and as a 2+2, but they shared a wheelbase of 2,290 mm (90.2 in) and had the same interior dimensions. The C had a relatively basic interior and an advertised engine output of 42 CV DIN (31 kW). Relatively few were sold and this version was dropped after a year. The CT was more luxuriously equipped and boasted an engine output of 50 CV DIN (37 kW). The CT would prove more popular; it continued in production until 1967.

From the outset overall sales volumes were lower than Panhard had anticipated, which may have contributed to arguments against any further development of the four-door version that had been proposed. Although mid-size two-door saloons sold in reasonable numbers in Germany and the Alpine countries, a glance at the sales data suggests that in the French market four doors were a precondition for healthy sales volumes.

In 1965, the 2,550 mm (100.4 in) wheelbase versions became available, offering space for four or five, but still with only two doors. These were designated the Panhard 24 B and the Panhard 24 BT. Equipment levels and engine options were the same as for the shorter C and CT versions.

In 1966, perhaps in a belated bid for volume sales, a new entry-level version was offered; the Panhard 24 BA. In contrast to the 24s offered earlier, the BA has a very basic interior, with even the lidded glove box replaced by an open shelf. Enthusiasts have suggested that the 24 BA compromised the upmarket image of the more expensive versions. Very few 24 BAs were produced.

Citroën assumed full control of Panhard's automotive business in April 1965. In 1964 and 1965, Panhard had produced approximately 10,000 24s per year; 1966 saw that rate approximately halved. Still desperately short of production capacity, Citroën decided to forego further development of the Panhard 24 and perpetuation of the Panhard brand, opting instead to use the capacity of the Panhard plant to increase the output of the 2CV Fourgonettes which were in greater demand.

Production of the Panhard 24 officially ended on 20 July 1967.

Citroën had not had a medium-sized sedan of their own since the 1930s. The Citroën GS introduced in 1970 finally filled that gap in Citroën's range, and in the process paid tribute to the Panhard heritage. The GS was a modern, aerodynamic, spacious, medium-sized sedan with a compact air-cooled four-cylinder boxer motor driving the front wheels, which described the car the Panhard 24 might have become had Panhard been permitted to build the range into a full replacement for the PL 17.

== Uruguayan Production of Panhard 24 CT ==
An unsanctioned fibreglass-bodied Panhard 24 CT was built in Uruguay for the local market by the Uruguayan manufacturer of Panhard vehicles. These cars are distinguishable by their colour-coded fibreglass bumpers. Uruguayan 24 CT production continued beyond that of the official French version, with the last units being sold as 1968 models.

== Technical data ==
Panhard 24 technical data (Manufacturer's figures except where stated)
Panhard 24	C coupé (short)	CT coupé (short)	B saloon (long)	BT saloon (long)	BA saloon (long)
Production years:	1963–1964	1963–1967	1964–1967	1964–1967	1965–1966
Units produced:	1,623	14,181	2,037	10,649	161
Engine:	2-cylinder-boxer (four-stroke), front-mounted				
Bore x stroke:	84.85 mm × 75 mm (3.3 in × 3.0 in)				
Displacement:	848 cc (51.75 cu in)				
Max. power at rpm:	42 CV DIN (31 kW; 41 bhp) at 5250; 50 CV SAE (37 kW; 49 bhp) at 5250	50 CV DIN (37 kW; 49 bhp) at 5750; 60 CV SAE (44 kW; 59 bhp) at 5750	42 CV DIN (31 kW; 41 bhp) at 5250; 50 CV SAE (37 kW; 49 bhp) at 5250	50 CV DIN (37 kW; 49 bhp) at 5750; 60 CV SAE (44 kW; 59 bhp) at 5750	42 CV DIN (31 kW; 41 bhp) at 5250; 50 CV SAE (37 kW; 49 bhp) at 5250
Compression ratio:	-	8.3:1	-	8.3:1	-
Fuel feed:	Single Zenith Carburetter 36 WIN	Single Zenith Carburetter 38 NDIX	Single Zenith Carburetter 36 WIN	Single Zenith Carburetter 38 NDIX	Single Zenith Carburetter 36WIN
Fuel capacity:	42 L (11.1 US gal; 9.2 imp gal)				
Valvetrain:	2 valves per cylinder, torsion-bar valve springs, integrated non-detachable head				
Engine cooling:	Air				
Gearbox:	4-speed all-synchromesh manual and front-wheel drive				
Electrical system:	12-volt				
Front suspension:	Independent connected by leaf spring				
Rear suspension:	Dual Torsion Bars with Tube Shocks				
Brakes front/rear:	drum/drum	drum/drum disc/disc after 1965	drum/drum	drum/drum disc/disc after 1965	drum/drum
Body structure:	Tubular-frame chassis. Separate all-steel body				
Dry weight (approx):	830–840 kg (1,830–1,850 lb)				
Track, front/rear:	1,295 / 1,295 mm (51.0 / 51.0 in)				
Wheelbase:	2,286 mm (90.0 in)		2,550 mm (100 in)		
Length:	4,267 mm (168.0 in)	4,267 mm (168.0 in)	4,490 mm (177 in)	4,490 mm (177 in)	4,490 mm (177 in)
Width:	1,620 mm (64 in)	1,620 mm (64 in)	1,620 mm (64 in)	1,620 mm (64 in)	1,620 mm (64 in)
Height:	1,220 mm (48 in)	1,220 mm (48 in)	1,220 mm (48 in)	1,220 mm (48 in)	1,220 mm (48 in)

== Sources and further reading ==
- Dominique Pagneux, Guide Panhard tous les modèles de 1945 à 1967, E/P/A, 1993
- Dominique Pagneux, Panhard, Le grand Livre, E/P/A, Paris 1996
- Bernard Vermeylen, Panhard et Levassor, entre tradition et modernité, ETAI, 2005
- Yann Le Lay et Bernard Vermeylen, "La Panhard 24 de mon père", ETAI, 1996
- L'Archives du Collectionneur, e.p.a. Dyna 54 etc., PL17, 24
- Benoit Pérot, "Panhard, la doyenne d'avant garde", e.p.a., Paris, 1979
- Panhard factory repair manuals and parts books
