= Panhard Dyna Junior =

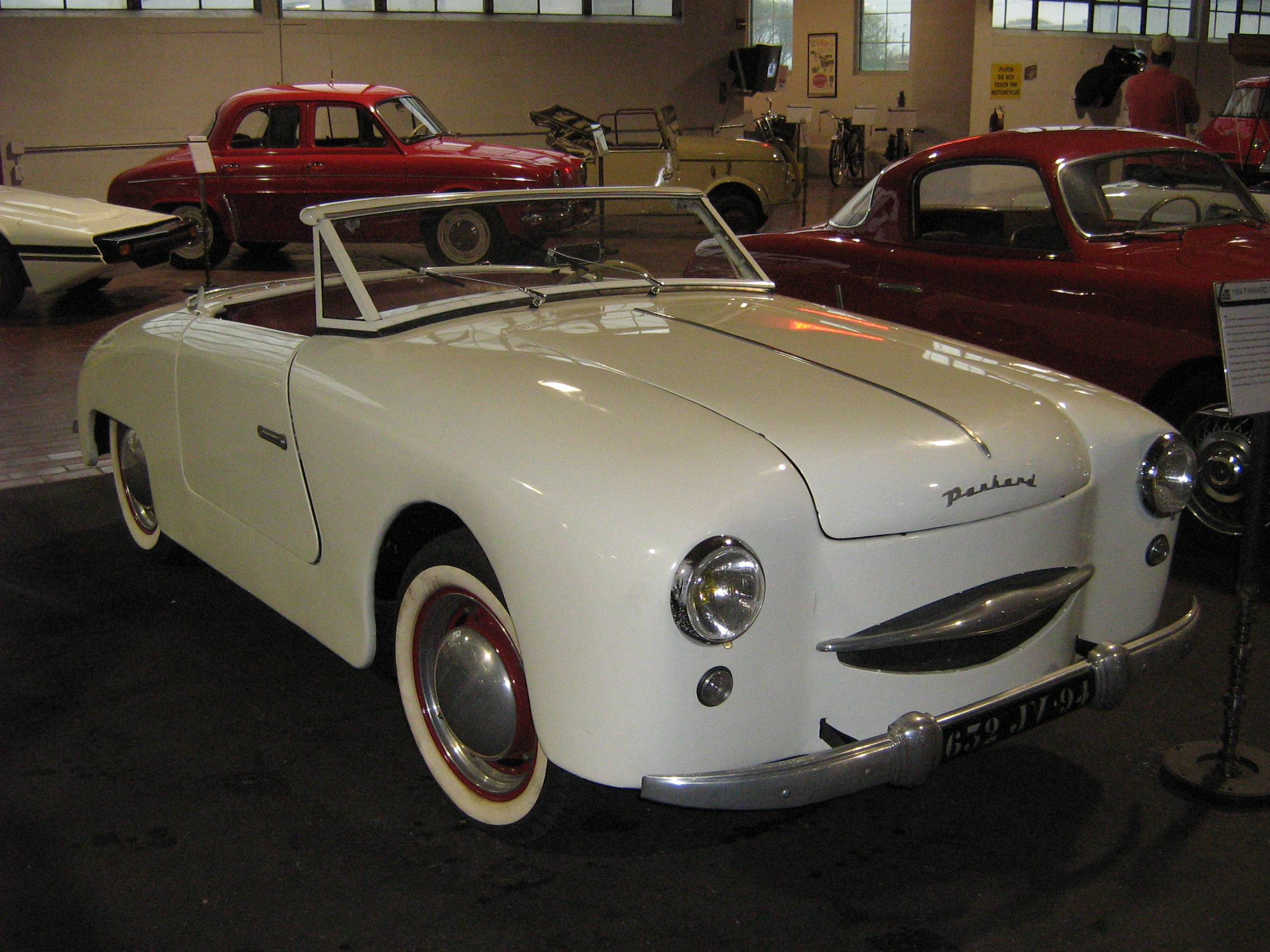

Overview
- Manufacturer: Panhard
- Also called: Panhard Junior
- Production: 4707
- Model years: 1952–1956
- Assembly: France
- Designer: Albert Lemaitre

Body and chassis
- Class: Sports car
- Body style: Two-door roadster or cabriolet
- Layout: Front-engine, front-wheel drive
- Platform: Panhard Dyna X

Powertrain
- Engine: Air-cooled 2-cylinder boxer 745 cc (45.5 cu in) (4 CV and 4 CV Sprint); 851 cc (51.9 cu in) (5 CV and 5 CV Sprint)
- Transmission: 4-speed manual

Dimensions
- Wheelbase: 2,127 mm (83.7 in)
- Length: 3,630 mm (142.9 in)
- Width: 1,470 mm (57.9 in)
- Height: 1,280 mm (50.4 in)
- Kerb weight: 630 kg (1,388.9 lb)

Chronology
- Predecessor: none
- Successor: none

The Panhard Dyna Junior is a small sports car built by Panhard from 1952 until 1956. The car was initially offered as a roadster and later as a cabriolet. Slightly over 4,700 were built.

== Development ==
In early 1951, Joseph Bell (JB) Ferguson approached Panhard with a proposal to build a small sports car for the American market. Ferguson, the brother of Harry Ferguson, had emigrated to the US and in 1951 was running New York based Fergus Motors importing and reselling of a variety of European cars including Panhards. Panhard undertook the project with Ferguson's financial support.

To reduce design costs and speed development the Dyna Junior was built with the chassis and front-wheel drive power-train from the Dyna X.

Panhard hired the carrosserie Di Rosa and their chief designer Albert Lemaitre to design the body and build a prototype. Di Rosa, known primarily for their work on trucks and buses, was able to complete the first aluminum-bodied prototype in just a few months. The car had a single door on the driver's side and a fold-down windshield. Jean Panhard reviewed the car and requested extensive changes. Ferguson, who had received pictures of the prototype, withdrew from the project. In a very short time a second prototype was ready that was approved by Panhard, and ten pre-production examples were ordered.

Panhard originally planned to build just 500 Dyna Juniors but decided to increase production in response to demand. To adapt the car to larger production volumes and reduce costs Panhard decided that the production Junior would get a steel body instead of one of aluminum. This change increased the weight of the car by more than 100 kg (220.5 lb).

The car debuted at the Paris Motor Show in October 1951 and sales officially started at the beginning of the following year. Production of the car was initially done at Di Rosa's factory, but they were unable to meet demand and Panhard moved the Junior's assembly line to their factory in Orléans. Di Rosa would close shortly afterwards.

The Dyna Junior was characterized by simple lines and few frills. Exterior decoration was limited to the grille inherited from the Dyna X. The car had exposed hinges on the trailing edge of the two passenger doors that opened "Suicide"-style. There were no external door handles, so opening the door required reaching in through the sliding plastic side windows to reach the interior latch. There was likewise no external trunk lid, with the rear storage compartment accessed by folding down the backrest of the two-place bench-seat. The interior was spartan, with a single centre-mounted dial for the speedometer and a gearshift lever sprouting from the dashboard as in the Dyna X.

Despite having just 25.7 kW (34.5 hp) the car's performance, handling, fuel economy, and affordable purchase price made the Junior popular with young car buyers.

== Specifications and running changes ==
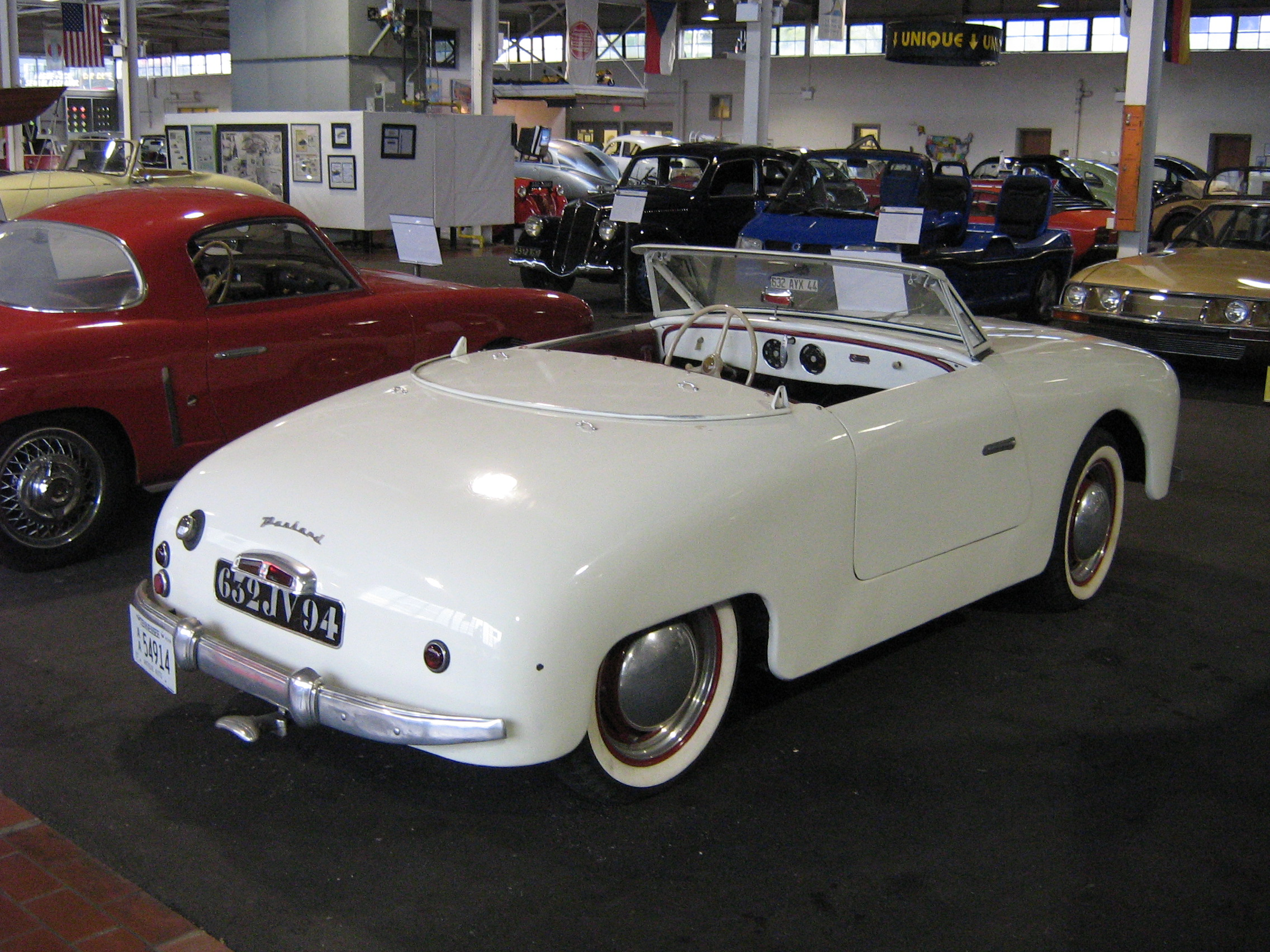
Dyna Junior rear three-quarter view

The Dyna Junior would use two versions of the Dyna X chassis over the course of its production history. Early Juniors used the X86 chassis from the Dyna X 120 while later models used the X87 chassis from the Dyna X 130. This platform gave the Junior a wheelbase of 2,127 mm (83.7 in) and front and rear tracks of 1,220 mm (48.0 in).

The front suspension was independent with upper and lower transverse leaf springs, while the rear was a rigid trailing axle with a central pivot and torsion bars. Shock-absorbers were hydraulic Houdaille units and the brakes were nine-inch drums on all four wheels. Tires front and rear were 145 × 400. The transaxle was the four-speed manual gearbox from the Dyna X.

The Dyna Junior was powered by the air-cooled two-cylinder OHV boxer engine designed by Louis Delagarde. The earliest cars used the 745 cc (45.5 cu in) GM750 SS3 engine that produced 24.3 kW (32.6 hp) at 5,000 rpm giving a maximum speed of 120 km/h (74.6 mph). The GM750 Sprint engine that produced 26.5 kW (35.5 hp) at 5000 rpm from the same displacement was an option.

In April 1952 the larger 851 cc (51.9 cu in) GM850 38 CV engine making 27.9 kW (37.4 hp) became available, raising top speed to 125 km/h (77.7 mph). The GM 850 S 40 CV Sprint version of this engine making 30.9 kW (41.4 hp) at 5000 rpm could also be ordered.

In February 1953, the roadster was joined in Panhard's lineup by a cabriolet version that came with exterior door handles and wind-up glass side windows in place of the plastic sliders on the roadster. In March the Junior began to use the X87 chassis, and a three-seat bench seat was fitted.

In 1954, the grille from the Dyna X was replaced by a simpler oval opening with an aluminum crosspiece similar to that on the Dyna Z and the instrument panel was upgraded to two dials. In March 1954, the bumpers were changed. In June of this year the 745 cc versions were dropped.

In 1955, the car was offered with an optional MAG supercharger that raised power at 60 hp and top speed to 145 km/h. In March the roadster was dropped from the line-up.

Production of the Panhard Dyna Junior ceased in April 1956.

== Model comparison ==
Model	X 86	X 86 Sprint	X 87	X 87 Sprint
Production dates	August 1952 to June 1954	February 1952 to June 1954	August 1952 to April 1956	August 1952 to April 1956
Engine	2-cylinder, 4-stroke boxer	2-cylinder, 4-stroke boxer	2-cylinder, 4-stroke boxer	2-cylinder, 4-stroke boxer
Displacement	745 cc (45.5 cu in)	745 cc (45.5 cu in)	851 cc (51.9 cu in)	851 cc (51.9 cu in)
Taxable horsepower	4 CV	4 CV	5 CV	5 CV
Horsepower	24 kW (32.2 hp)	27 kW (36.2 hp)	29 kW (38.9 hp)	31 kW (41.6 hp)

== Specials ==
Both the Panhard Dyna X and Dyna Junior were used as the basis for other limited-production vehicles. Specials that were based on the Junior include the following cars.

- Coach-builder Pichon-Parat built about thirty copies of a fixed-head coupé version of the Dyna Junior that followed the original's appearance very closely. The same company also designed a more streamlined body that could use the chassis of either a Dyna X or Junior, depending on the customer's wishes. About 60 of these cars, called Dolomites, were built with production continuing until 1956.
- The Panhard Rafale designed by Carmétall and distributed by Dijon Tourisme was a small coupé built on a Dyna Junior chassis with a lightweight alloy body.
- Designer Howard "Dutch" Darrin was commissioned by US Panhard importer Robert Perreau to build a one-off custom bodied Dyna Junior. This car was exhibited at the Los Angeles Motor Show in October 1953 on the Panhard stand, and then shipped to France to be reviewed by Panhard. The project did not go into production.
- Don Racine built and raced the "Aardvark" cycle-fendered Junior-based special in a variety of SCCA events beginning in the mid-1950s. After falling into obscurity the car was located and restored.
- While most of the Devin Panhards were built on a custom chassis some used part of the Panhard Dyna Junior subframe along with the engine and transaxle.
- Coach-builder Ghia-Aigle of Lugano Switzerland built a single alloy-bodied coupé based on a Dyna Junior chassis that was shown at the 1954 Geneva Auto Show.
- Belgian coach-builder Albert D'Ieteren presented a Dyna Junior with custom coupé bodywork at the Brussels Auto Salon in 1954. Only one was built.
- The Nichols Panhard specials were a series of cars built in Southern California by Murray Nichols using engines and chassis from Dyna Juniors.
- The Fairchild special was a car built by Jerry Fairchild with a body by Murray Nichols. It is considered by some to be a "Nichols Special". The car had a custom chassis that used both the engine block and suspension from a Dyna Junior. The engine was extensively modified, being adapted to use fuel injection and dual overhead camshafts. It also at some time had a supercharger as used on the later Juniors.

== Motorsports ==
- A Dyna Junior took part in the 1953 Tour de France Auto, where it placed 14th.
- A Dyna Junior driven by Georges Trouis and Jacques Blanchet competed in the 1953 1000 km of Nürburgring, where they placed 22nd.
- A variety of Dyna Juniors and Junior-based specials appeared at races in Europe and America throughout the late 1950s.
- The Fairchild special won the California Sports Car Club's H-Modified Class in the Pacific Cost Championship in both 1958 and 1959 and placed second in SCCA H-Modified in 1958.
