= Jacques Durand =

French engineer and automobile designer (1920–2009)

- Born: June 28, 1920; Paris
- Died: September 16, 2009 (aged 89); Mougins
- Occupation: Engineer

Jacques Durand (28 June 1920 – 16 August 2009) was a French engineer, model builder and automobile designer. He is primarily known for designing several sports cars, which were built in small volumes in France beginning in the 1950s and continuing into the 1990s.

== Early years ==
Durand was born in Paris on 28 June 1920 and grew up at the family's summer home in Antony. He attended the Lycée Lakanal in Scéaux and then the École des Atelier des Postes, télégraphes et téléphones, graduating with a CAP (certificat d'aptitude professionnel) de mécanique de précision. Upon his return to Paris he took steps to avoid being conscripted by the STO (service de travail obigatoire) being run by the German forces then occupying France.

In 1943 Durand started making a line of small-displacement engines (0.9 cc to 30 cc) for model airplanes, cars, and boats in the basement of his house. These engines were sold under the name "Jidé", which was a homophone of his initials "JD" in French. The Jidé line was succeeded by the Vega series in 1949. Durand then began putting the engines into his own series of 1/10th scale models of racing cars like the Jaguar D-type and Mercedes-Benz 300SL, among others. Bodies for these scale models were made out of aluminum.

In 1957 Durand met the father of racing driver Jean Vinatier. The elder Vinatier's Alpine A106 Mille Miglia had been damaged, and to understand what would be needed to repair the car's fibreglass bodywork Durand paid a visit to the workshops of Chappe et Gessalin to quietly observe the production of automobile bodywork in plastic by professionals. To him the process seemed simple, but much experimentation was needed before he was satisfied with the quality of his own work. Once he had mastered the fundamentals of producing automobile bodies he began planning to produce a body for a car of his own.

== Vehicle designs ==
=== Atla ===
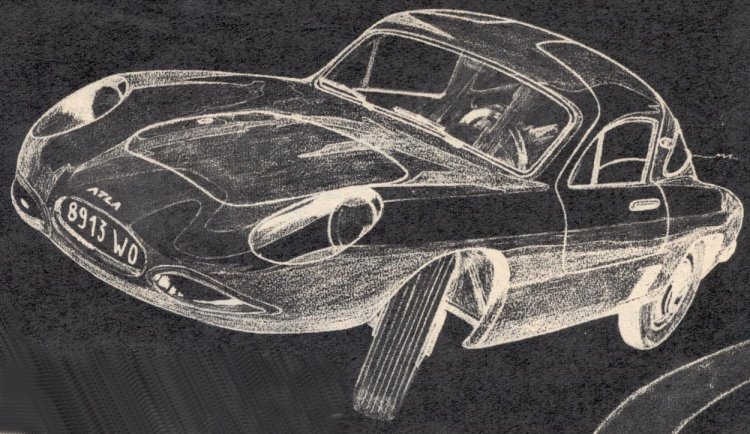
Sketch of an Atla

The first full-sized car designed by Durand was the Atla, also called the A.T.L.A. in some references. Durand designed a small berlinette body to be made in fibreglass. The design was notable for having gullwing doors like the 300SL. The car received a tubular steel spaceframe chassis courtesy of engineer Charles Cusson. Most of the cars used a rear-engine powertrain sourced from the Renault 4CV, although at least one Atla was built with the air-cooled boxer-twin engine and transaxle from a Panhard Dyna Z in a front-engine, front-wheel-drive configuration. Basic weight for the car was just 500 kg (1,102.3 lb). Financing to build a series of Atlas was provided by Renault dealer Jean Schwab, who also assigned one of his employees to help with painting and trimming the cars. The prototype was complete by 1957 and the car went into production the next year. A major price increase near the end of 1958 caused orders to come to a halt, so the Atla was only built for one year. The total number of Atlas built is estimated to have been fewer than thirty cars.

=== Sera ===
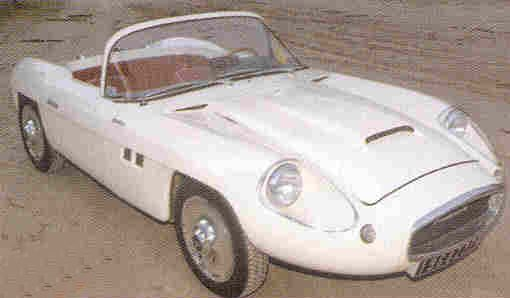
1959 Sera

The next car that Durand was involved with was the Sera. This was not the SERA-CD company founded by Charles Deutsch, as indicated by that company's full name of "Société d'Études et de Réalisations Automobiles - Charles Deutsch". The two companies were, however, contemporaries. The company for which Durand designed his Sera was founded by M.G. Rey and was based in Porte de Villiers, Paris. For them Durand designed a stylish 2-seat convertible. The Sera was designed from the outset to use the engine and front-wheel drive transaxle from the Panhard Dyna Z. The car was unveiled to the public at the 1959 Paris Auto Salon. Early cars were built in a facility in Paris but production was later moved to the former Motobloc factory in Bordeaux where only another 15 cars were built before the factory was shut down again.

One of the Bordeaux Seras was exhibited at a fair in Barcelona Spain. This resulted in Durand receiving a proposal to build the car in Spain, which led him to relocate to Tarragona to restart Sera production there. Import restrictions imposed by the Franco government made it impossible to obtain the French Panhard components needed to complete the cars. One Spanish-built Sera was completed with a three-cylinder two-stroke DKW engine in a front-wheel drive layout and a second car was fitted with a Fiat engine in a front-engine, rear-wheel drive configuration before the endeavour collapsed.

=== ACPA ===
After moving back to France from Spain Durand returned to Antony and in 1962 once again partnered with Cusson to design a new car.

The name of the project was ACPA, which was an acronym that is variously reported to have stood for "Atelier de Carrosserie Plastique Automobile" or "Ateliers de Construction et de Production Automobile". (This project is also called "ALPA" by some, but there is little supporting information. Pictures also exist of the cars with "ACPA" nameplates. The same site shows an ACPA with the name "ARPA" across the rear, which name Cusson later used for his own line of Formula France cars.)

The car was an attractive berlinette with a large glass backlight. The windshield was taken from the Renault Floride. Four bodies for the new car were made. Durand took two and built them with front-wheel drive Panhard powertrains. Cusson took the other two and built his cars using engines and transmissions from the Peugeot 404. In December 1963 Durand and Cusson dissolved their partnership and separated.

=== Arista ===
The Arista predated Durand's involvement, having been created in 1952 by renaming the earlier Callista Ranelagh roadster that had first appeared at the 1950 24 Heures du Mans. Funding for the Callista came from Panhard dealer and racing driver Raymond Gaillard, who renamed the car Arista at the end of 1952 when the original developers of the car left the company. Gaillard added a coupé and a 2+2 to the model line-up that were styled by Max Berlemont and with bodywork in fibreglass by Chappe et Gessalin. These cars continued in production until 1963, when Gaillard hired Durand to revise the cars, which became known as the Arista JD.

This new car was a development of Durand's ACPA berlinette, which Durand had shown to Gaillard after leaving his partnership with Cusson. Once again Durand selected a Panhard front-wheel drive power-train, as used in the ACPA and the previous Aristas. The engine was available in 42bhp normal or 50bhp Tigre versions. When the Panhard engine became unavailable some later cars were built with engines from Peugeot, Fiat-Neckar, Ford and Triumph. Out of a total production of just over 100 cars about a dozen Arista JDs were built between 1964 and 1967. In 1967 Gaillard wound up the company, but by that time Durand had already left for his next project.

=== Sovam ===
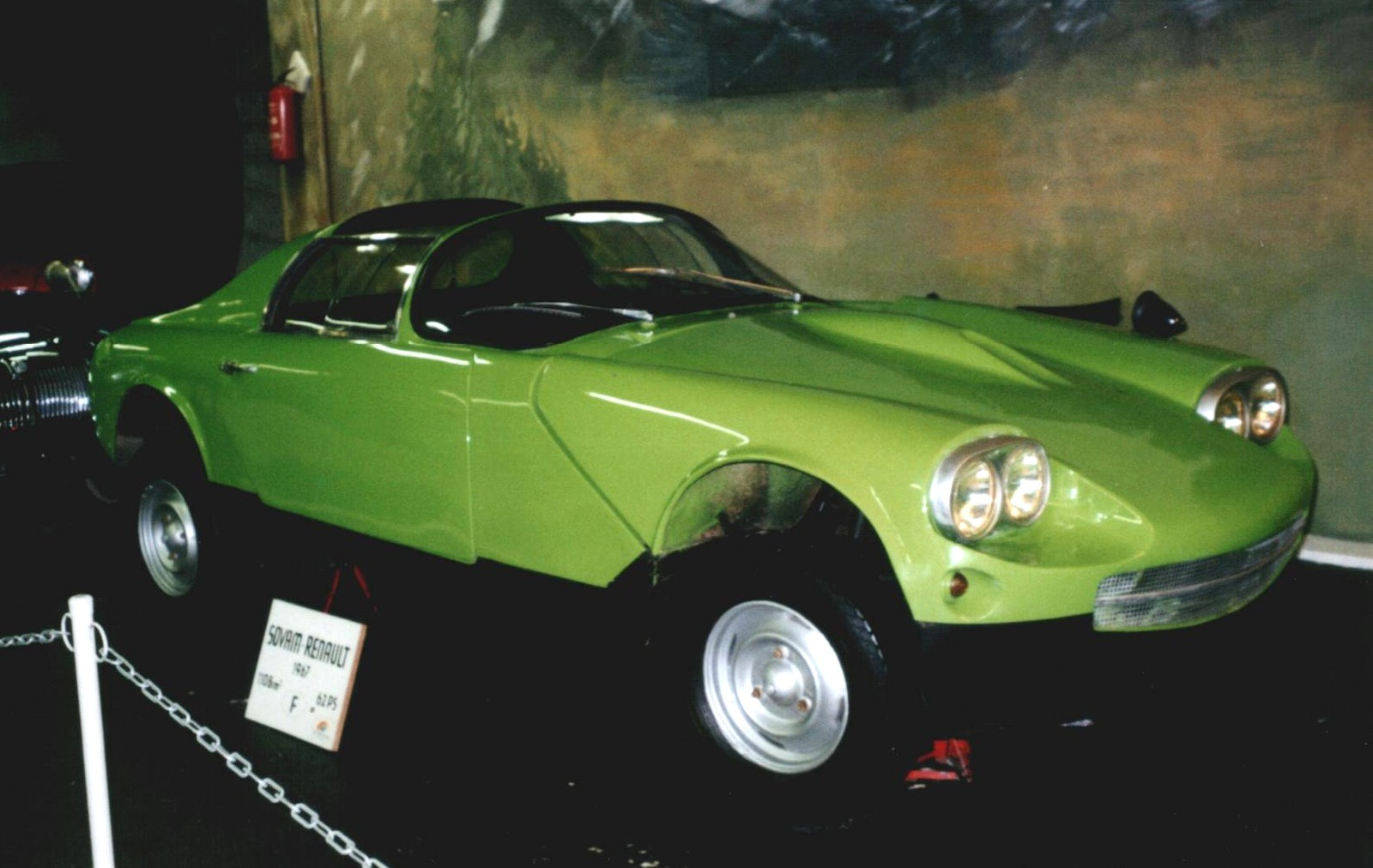

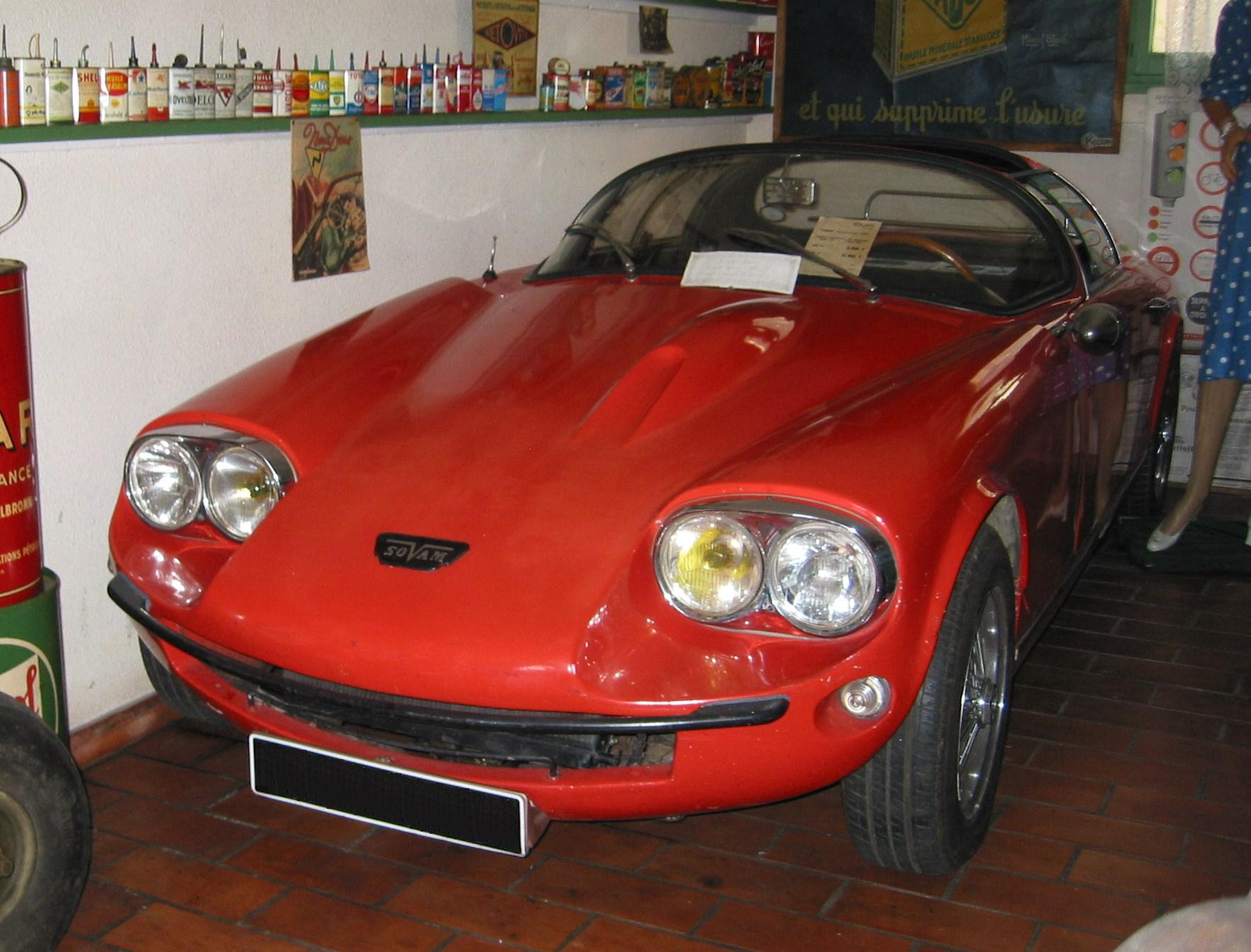
1968 Sovam

The SOciété des Véhicules André Morin (SOVAM) was a French company based in Parthenay that started by building mobile shop kiosks on light truck chassis and later specialized in mobile equipment for airports. In 1964 they introduced the "Véhicule Utilitaire de Livraison" ('VUL'), a fibreglass truck or van body mounted on a shortened Renault 4 chassis for urban delivery work.

The following year founder André Morin decided to develop a small sports car that was also based on the Renault 4 chassis and hired Durand to design the body. For the Sovam "Voiture de Sport" (VdS) Durand produced a compact coupé body with quad headlamps, a steeply raked windscreen, and a removable roof panel. The car was presented at the 1965 Paris Auto Show and generated enough interest that Morin decided to put the car into production. Performance with the original 845 cc engine was disappointing, so Sovam soon made an 1108 cc engine available. A new hardtop model was released in 1967 with 2+2 seating, rectangular headlamps and a 1300 cc Gordini-tuned engine. Although over 100 Sovam sports cars were sold the venture was never profitable and Sovam stopped production in 1969.

=== Jidé ===
Following the end of his time at Sovam, Jacques Durand moved to a town near Parthenay to develop a new sports coupe of his own that was based on the R8 Gordini engine and transaxle. For this car Durand resurrected the Jidé name that he had used for his earliest model engines. The Jidé car was a small hardtop two-seat coupé with a rear mid-engine, rear-wheel drive layout. The chassis was steel and the fibreglass body was bonded directly to it. Suspension was independent at all four wheels and braking was provided by four disc brakes. Power came from an assortment of Renault engines, including the ones used in the R8, R8 Gordini, and R12. The car was sold in either kit or assembled forms.

In 1973, having build just under 100 cars, Jacques Durand sold the Jidé brand and moved on to his next project.

=== Scora ===
Durand started his next project in Lapleau in Corrèze. This car was named the Scora, for "Société CORrezienne d'Automobile".

In general appearance the Scora resembled its predecessor so closely that the then-current owners of the Jidé brand sued Durand. While the front-suspension was still from the R8, the back of the chassis was updated. Engines options included the 1600 cc Gordini from the R17 and an 1800 cc engine with either carburetors or fuel-injection. The Scora was sold only in kit form and was debuted in 1974. The car became popular with rallye drivers. Durand built the car until 1992, when he sold the brand.

=== AMD ===
Durand partnered with his son Michel in a project called AMD (Automobiles Michel Durand) to produce a series of 1/5 scale models of a variety of cars in fibreglass. In 1991 AMD undertook to design a new full-size coupé with an advanced rocker-arm suspension. Although the design was completed this project never went beyond the point of having a scale model of the car built.

== Postscript ==
Throughout the years that Durand was designing cars he was also involved in other projects. At various times he applied his experience with fibre-reinforced plastics to making sailboats, sports steering-wheels, tool-boxes, mud-flaps and radiator shrouds.

Together with his son he made headlamp parts for Renault 5 Turbos, the bodywork for Jean Louis Schlesser's first Dakar buggy and once again returned to making a series of scale models of various sports cars, including his own Jidés.

Durand died on 16 August 2009 in Mougins. He was survived by wife Denise, son Michel and daughter Claudine.

In September 2010 a tribute to Durand and retrospective of his work was part of the 32nd Circuit International des Remparts d'Angoulême. The display took place on the Place des Halles.
