= Panhard PL 17 =

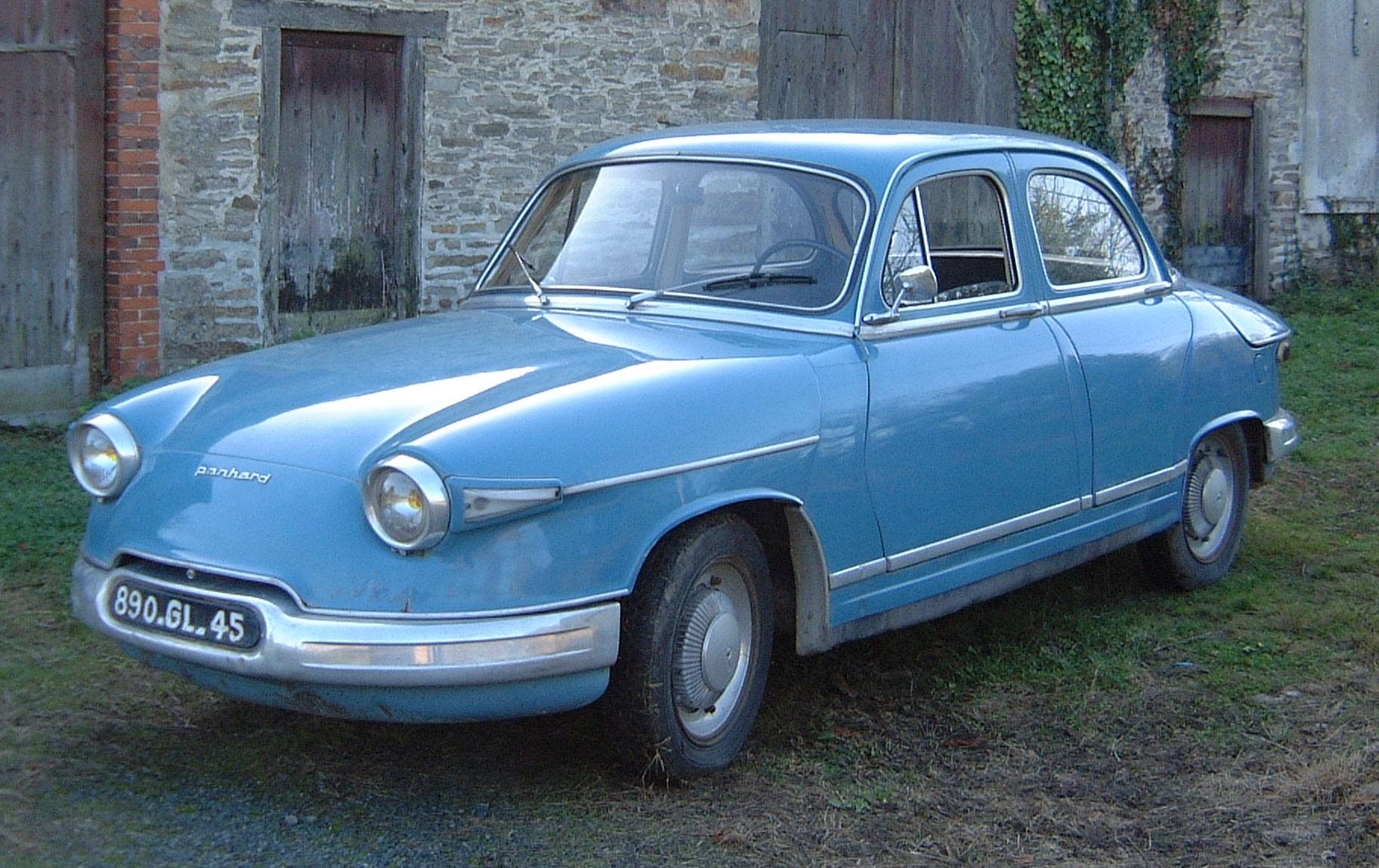
- 1964 Panhard PL 17

Overview
- Manufacturer: Société des Anciens Etablissements Panhard et Levassor
- Also called: Panhard 17
- Production: 1959–1965 approx 166,000 produced

Body and chassis
- Body style: 4-door saloon 2-door cabriolet 4-door station wagon
- Layout: Front-engine, front-wheel-drive

Powertrain
- Engine: 848 cc air-cooled flat-2 851 cc air-cooled flat-2

Dimensions
- Wheelbase: 2,570 mm (101.2 in); 2,800 mm (110.2 in) (Break)
- Length: 4,580 mm (180.3 in)
- Width: 1,660 mm (65.4 in); 1,620 mm (63.8 in) (Break)
- Height: 1,550 mm (61.0 in)
- Curb weight: 805 kg (1,775 lb)-830 kg (1,830 lb)

Chronology
- Predecessor: Panhard Dyna Z
- Successor: Panhard 24

The Panhard PL 17 is an automobile made by the French manufacturer Panhard from 1959 until 1965. Presented on 29 June 1959, as successor to the Panhard Dyna Z, the PL 17 was essentially a facelifted version of its predecessor. The initial four-door saloon (and pickup and van) was joined by the Cabriolet in 1961, and by the Break, a five-door estate version, in April 1963. The Break, developed by Italian company Pan Auto, sat on a longer wheelbase but was of the same overall length.

== Model history ==
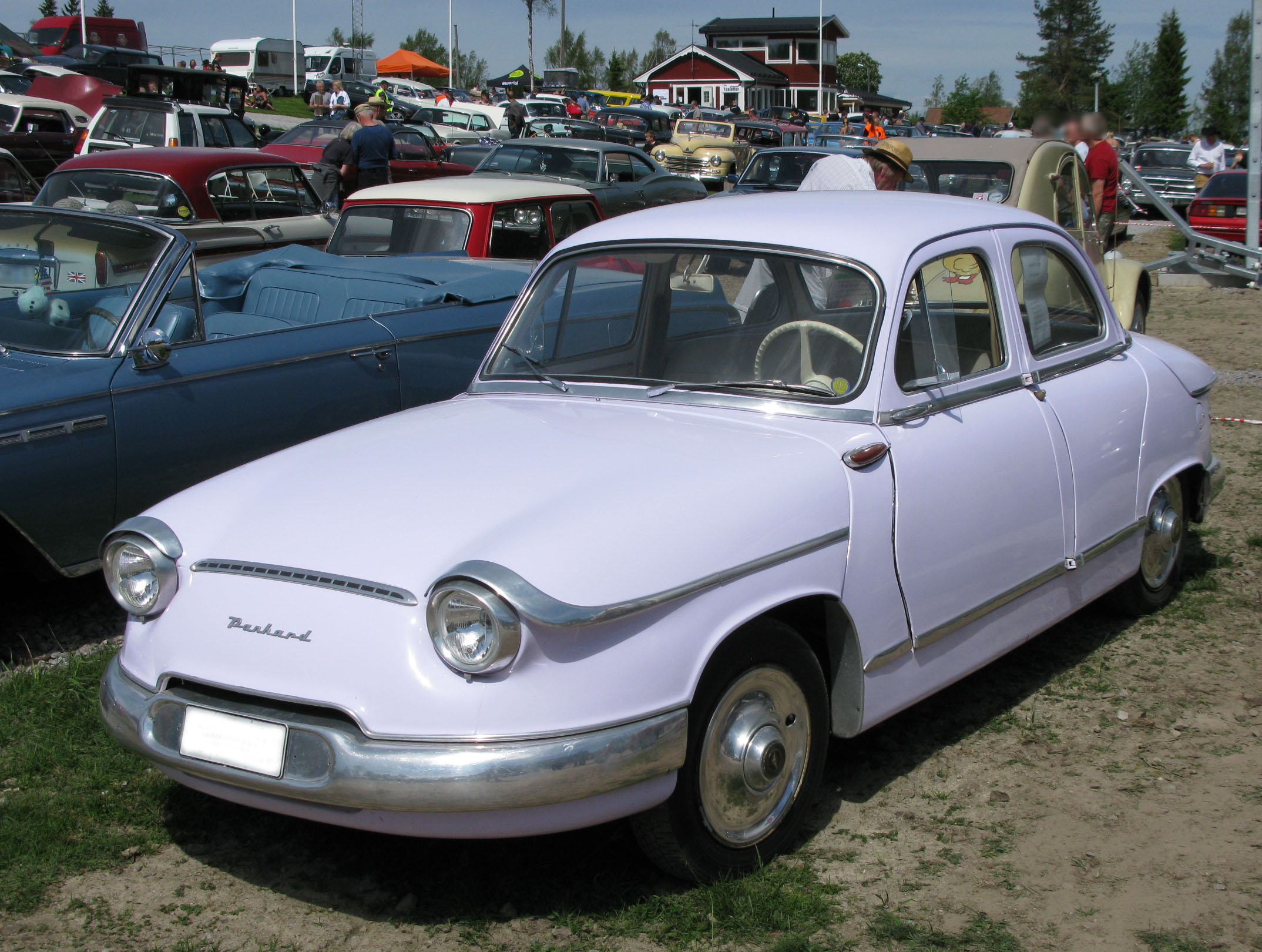
1960 Panhard PL 17

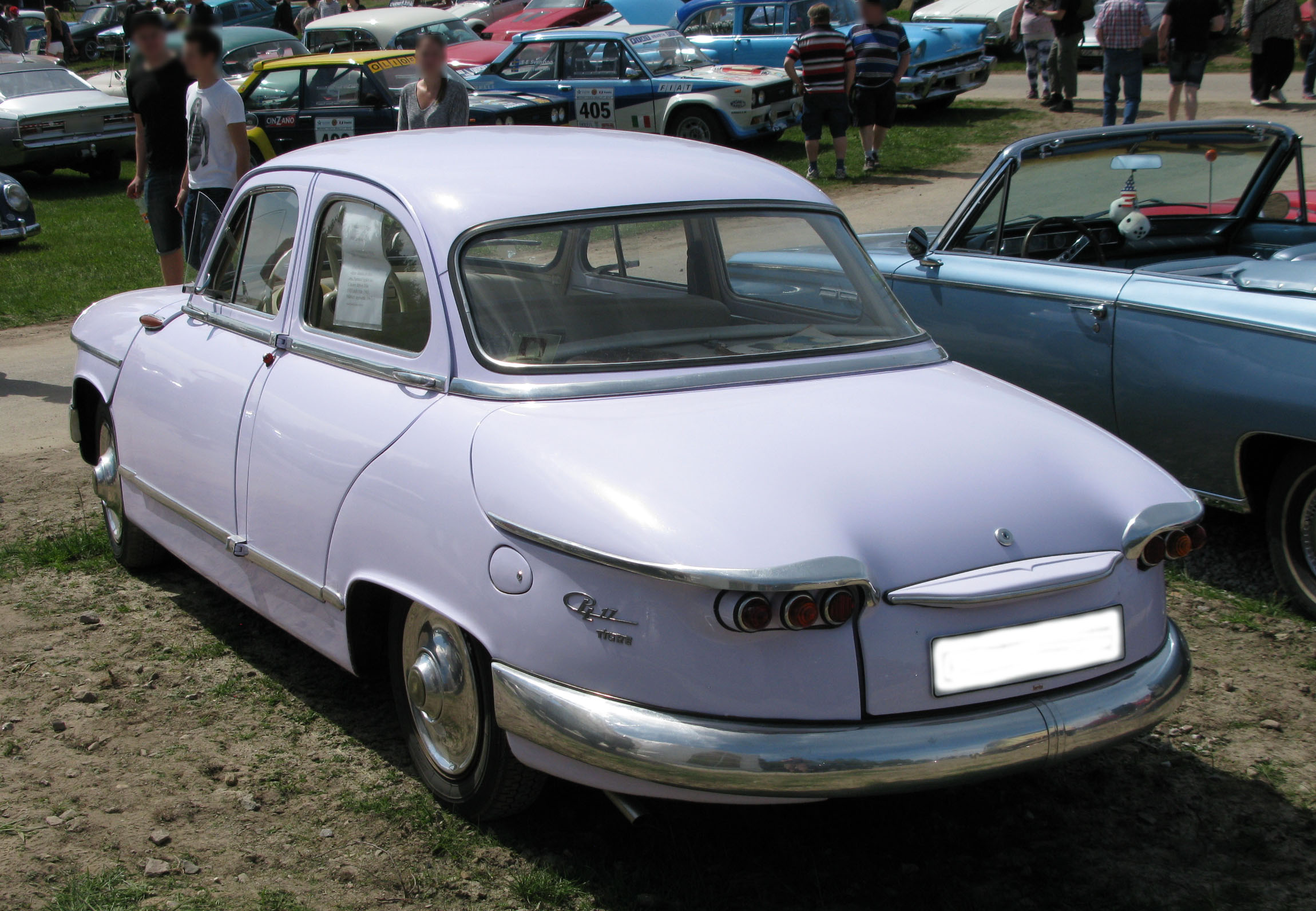
1960 Panhard 17 rear view

The model's name was derived from "PL" for "Panhard et Levassor" (the original full name of the company), with the "17" coming from the sum of 5+6+6, being 5 CV (fiscal horses, in the French power rating system) plus 6 for the car's six seats, plus 6 for the car's economy of 6 L/100 km (47 mpg_{‑imp}; 39 mpg_{‑US}). As the car was developed under close supervision by Citroën, it was also no coincidence that 17 is a lower number than that of the DS 19.

The two-door Cabriolet was first introduced in March 1960 and only available to customers in the United States. Not a runaway success, only 47 examples of this export-only model (internal code L2) were built. A regularly available version for European customers was shown at the 1960 Paris Salon, becoming available in 1961 (L5). The trim level was equivalent to the top-of-the-line sedan, the Grand Standing model. For the 1963 model year, the Cabriolet was updated with the new engine, becoming the L8 - 125 examples were built of this version. Never a strong seller, the convertible was discontinued later in 1963 and the production line used to build the new PL 17 Break instead.

In 1961 the entire line received a minor facelift: the front doors were now hung from the front, rather than the original's "suicide doors", while the turn signals were moved from near the base of the A-pillar to new positions flanking the headlamps.

From the 1964 model year, the letters PL were dropped; this approximately coincided with the completed takeover the company by Citroën. Other names were lightly changed as well, with the addition of a "B" (for Berline) and "BT" for the Tigre model. The luxurious Grand Standing version was replaced by the "Relmax". The car also underwent a slight facelift, losing the chrome unibrow at the front.

=== Utilitaires ===
In October 1958, a pickup and van version of the Dyna Z called the "Dyna Z Commerciale D65" had been presented. "D65" reflects the 650 kg (1,433 lb) payload, initially a pickup or canvas-covered pickup were available. In April 1959 a panel van and a chassis cab were added. 1,735 examples were built in the model's ten-month career, kept short since the Dyna Z was updated to the PL 17 model within less than a year. Since the PL 17 was essentially just a facelift, the D65 was updated with the new front treatment and went on sale simultaneously with the saloon. The bodystyles were the same as for the new Panhard F65 (model code WL1), with a glazed van model added to pricelists in July 1959.

In November 1959, a lighter-duty model with a 500 kg (1,102 lb) payload was added. Called the F50, this model was created to avoid parking time restrictions in the newly introduced Zones Bleues ("Blue Zones") surrounding several major French cities. Priced nearly the same, the only discernible difference was slightly smaller tires for the F50 (model code WL2). For 1961, the Utilitaires received the same cosmetic changes as did the rest of the range; the model codes were accordingly changed to WL3/WL4. The codes changed again for 1963 (WL6/WL7), when the modified, 848 cc engine was introduced. For 1964 the range was again facelifted (less chrome and new, trapezoidal turn signals), but the model names were not altered.

== Technical specifications ==
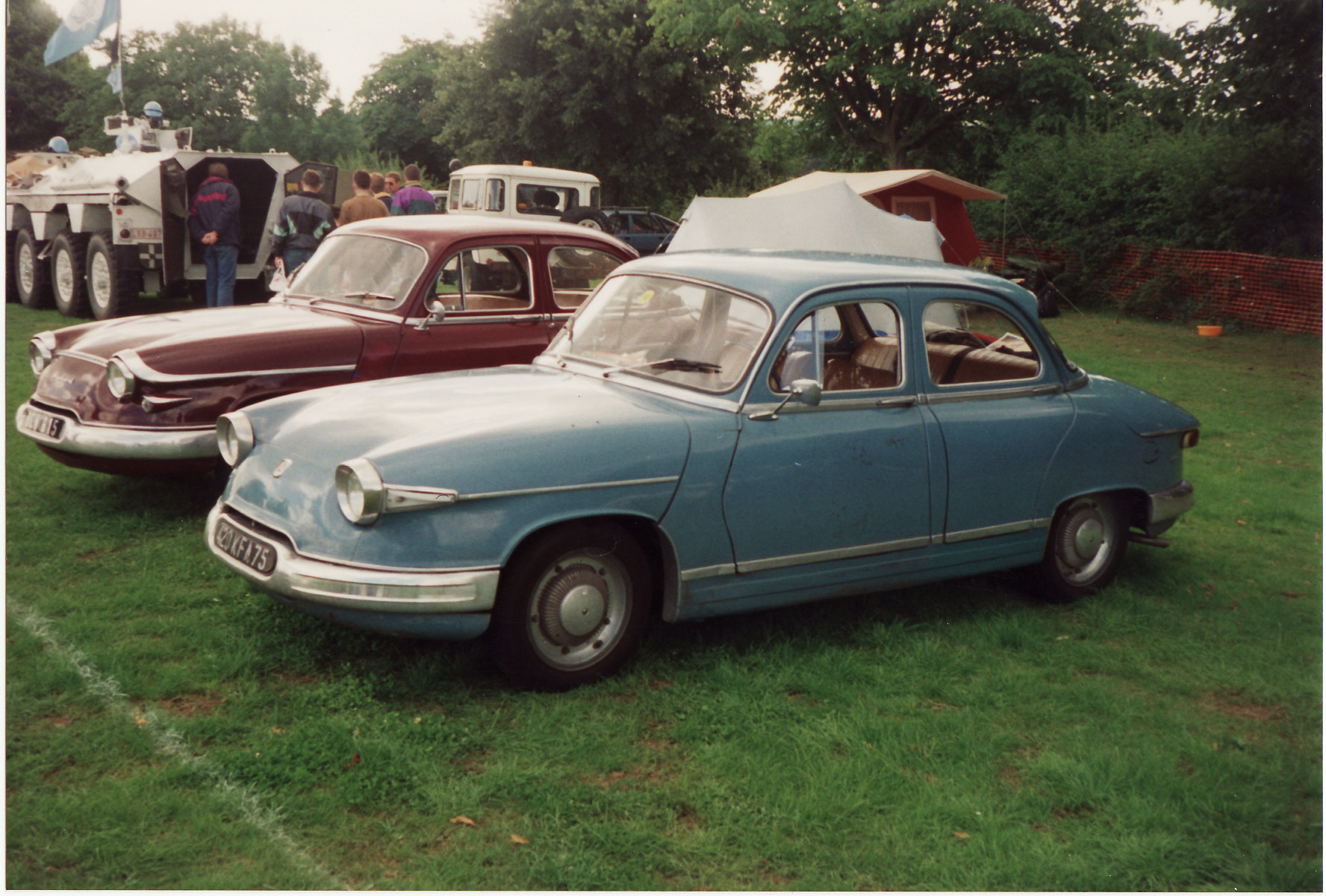
1964 Panhard 17B Relmax in front of an earlier (1961–1963) PL 17

Initially, the car continued to use the engines of the Dyna Z, both of 851 cc. The standard one gave 42 hp (31 kW) (DIN), the "Tigre" gave 50 hp (37 kW) (DIN). The engines are twin-cylinder air-cooled "boxer" types, mounted with the gearbox at the rear and the two exhausts at the front. Beginning in July 1960, the engines decreased in capacity to 848 cc (to suit tax limits at 850 cc in many markets), with power remaining as before. SAE horsepower claims were 50 hp (37 kW), and 60 hp (45 kW), respectively.

The front wheels are driven through a four-speed gearbox with column shift, with synchromesh on the upper three gears. Suspension at the front is provided by two transverse leaf springs, and at the back by three torsion bars each side.

The standard car weighs approximately 805 kg (1,775 lb), and the Tigre 830 kg (1,830 lb). This light weight combined with the car's streamlining (with a coefficient of drag said to be Cd 0.26) allows for top speeds of 130 kilometres per hour (81 mph) for standard sedans and 145 kilometres per hour (90 mph) for the Tigre.

It is possible to remove the back bench to enlarge the already considerable luggage space to 527 litres (18.6 cu ft). This space was available from model year 1964, when the spare wheel was moved from beneath the luggage space to under the bonnet, where it fits around the air filter. This is possible because the wheels have no centre — that is formed by the finned aluminum brake drums.

== Sales ==
The Panhard saloons produced after the Citroën take-over were not priced aggressively. In 1962, there were five different versions of the PL 17 offering 42 hp (31 kW) or 50 hp (37 kW) of maximum power and priced in France at between 6,990 and 8,240 francs for the standard sedan bodied versions. The similarly sized Simca Aronde came with power outputs ranging between 42 hp (31 kW) and 70 hp (51 kW), priced between 6,340 and 7,450 francs. The Panhard was a little longer and a little wider, leaving dealers trying to explain why an 850 cc Panhard should cost more than a 1300 cc Simca. Panhard connoisseurs, including many taxi owners, appreciated the PL 17's superior road holding and fuel economy, as well as the extra space afforded by the Panhard's greater cabin width. Less pleasing were the awkward gear box, still without synchromesh on the bottom ratio, and the steering which was heavy at low speeds. Performance, especially for the top of the range 50 hp (37 kW) "PL 17 Tigre" was helped by the Panhard's lighter body, although the extent of Panhard's weight advantage had been reduced over the previous decade as aluminium had become more expensive and light metal panels had been substituted for some of the steel ones. Pricing issues may explain why PL 17 sales levels were too low to enable the model to reach the volumes of the Aronde.

The Break model (L9) was developed by Pan Auto in Trento, Italy, with the idea of assembling it locally. It sat on a longer wheelbase but was of the same overall length. The original prototype received different front treatment of a more conventional design, with two large headlamps flanking a planar grille with horizontal ribbons. The taillights were borrowed from the contemporary Fiat 1800. Production ended up taking place in France, where it replaced the Cabriolet on the lines beginning in May 1963. The PL 17 Break was built in small numbers, with 2,998 examples being produced overall.

Overall, around 166,000 PL 17s were built. Of these, 136,000 were regular-engined sedans, with an additional 23,500 sedans with the Tigre engine. 398 convertibles (it is unknown if this includes the 47 L3 cabriolets built for the US in 1960), 2,998 Breaks, and 3,191 Utilitaires (commercial models) were also built.

A sporting two-door coupé with a fibreglass body on Dyna Z basis was built from 1956 by Arista as the Passy and later also Sport, with the Tigre engine. For 1963, a new design based on the PL 17, called the Arista JD (after its designer, Jacques Durand; it was also called the Arista Sport and Sport Spécial), appeared. While lighter and faster than a regular PL17, the rather expensive Arista did not find many buyers and only six examples were built.

== Motorsport ==
In 1961, a Panhard PL 17 won the Monte Carlo Rally, with PL 17s also taking the second and third places.

=== Rally victories ===
No.	Event	Year	Driver	Co-driver
1	(Monaco) 30ème Rallye Automobile de Monte-Carlo	1961	(France) Maurice Martin	(France) Roger Bateau

== Demise ==
In 1955, Citroën had acquired a minority 25% interest in Panhard, and ten years later, in 1965, Panhard's automobile division was finally absorbed by Citroën: the company ceased production of the PL 17 in the same year. The 24 model carried the manufacturer's name for two years more, and from then only military transport was badged with the Panhard name, the military division being the part of the business still not owned by Citroën.

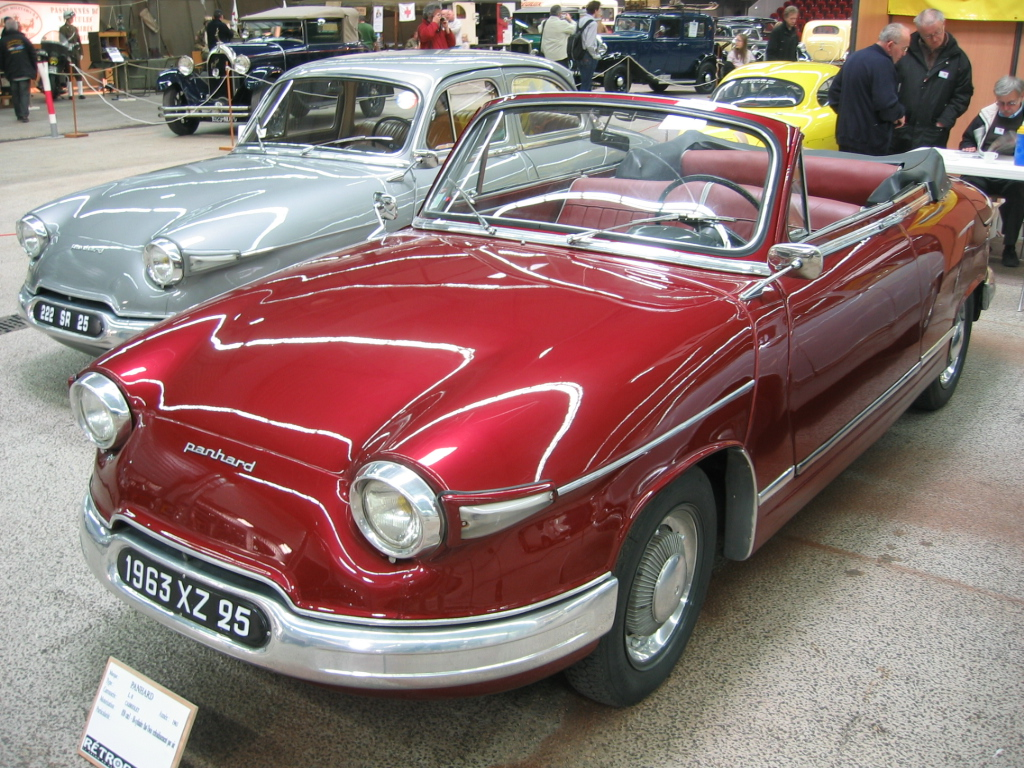
Panhard PL 17 Cabriolet

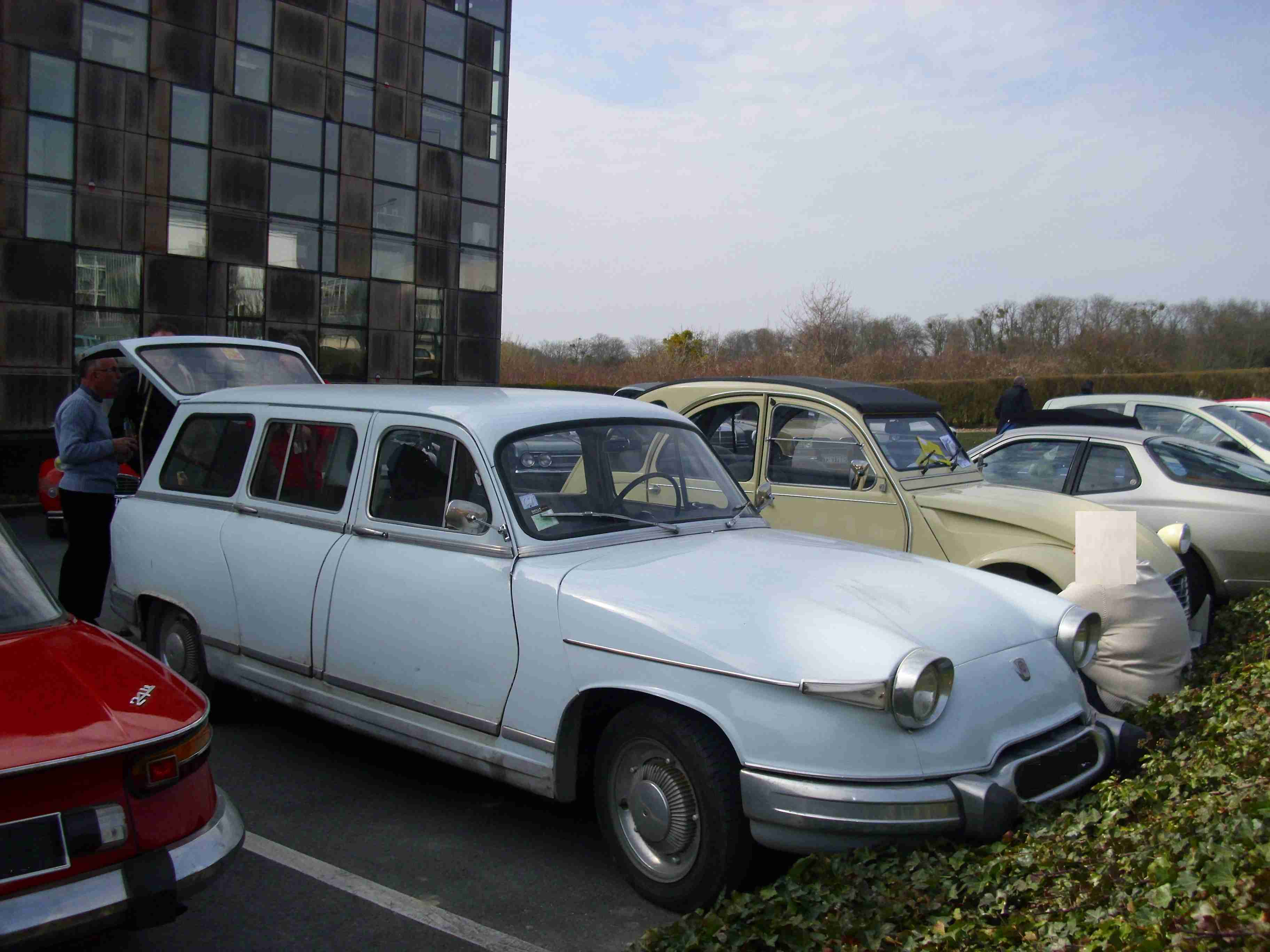
Panhard PL 17 Break

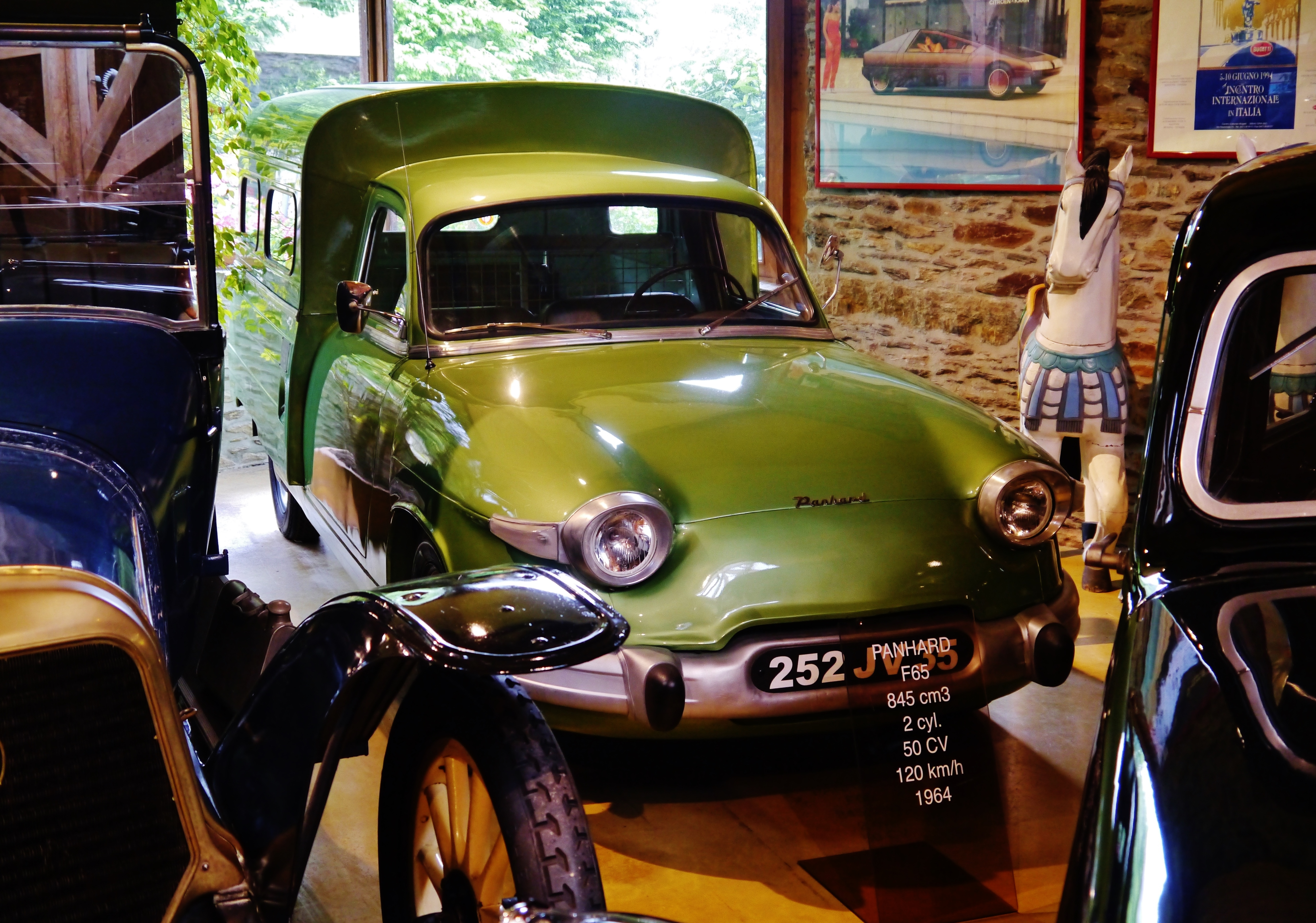
Panhard F65 glazed van
