= Panhard Dyna Z =

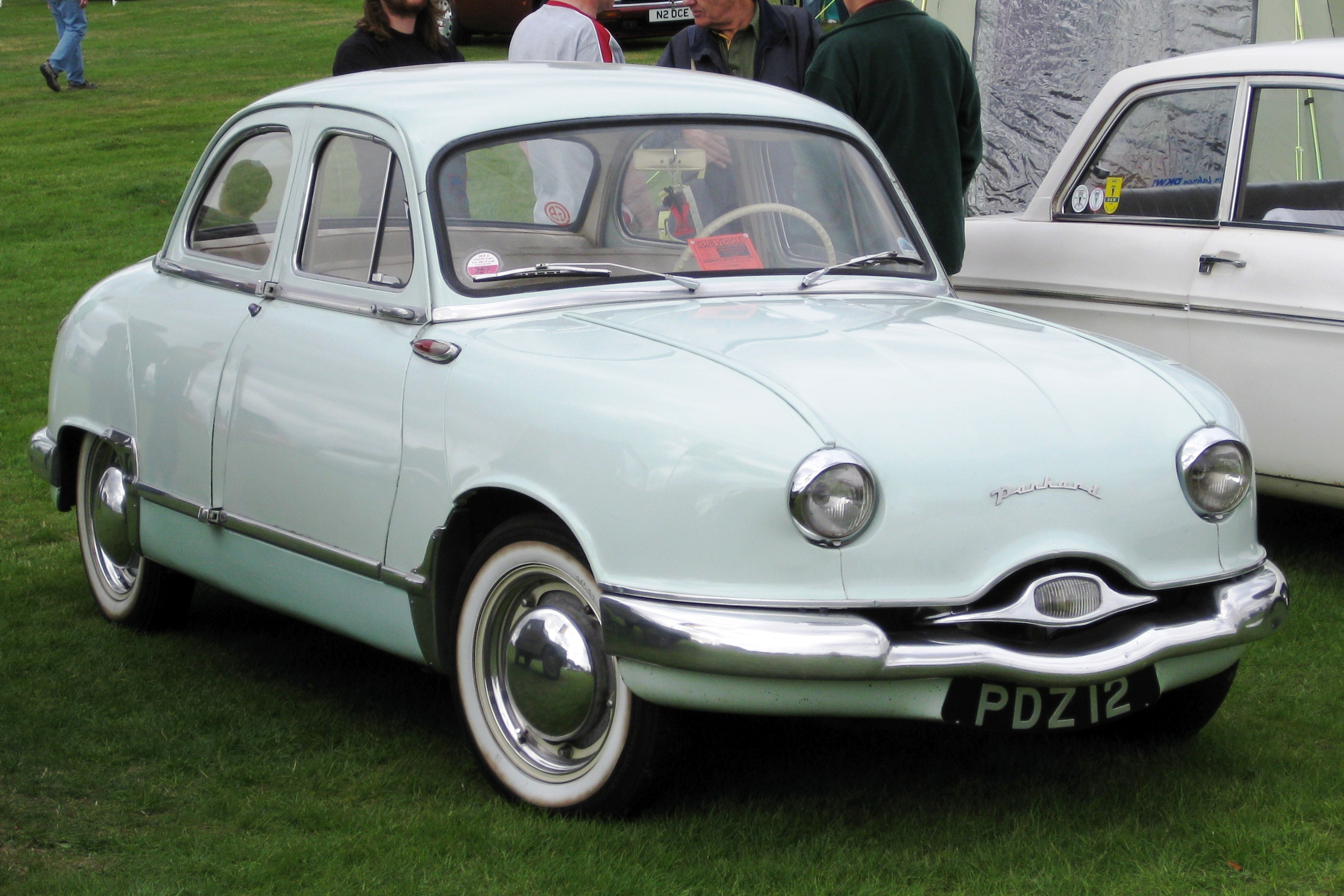
- Panhard Dyna Z 4-door saloon

Overview
- Manufacturer: Société des Anciens Etablissements Panhard et Levassor
- Production: 1954–1959 approx 140,000 produced

Body and chassis
- Class: Mid-size
- Body style: 4-door saloon 2-door cabriolet 2-door pickup
- Layout: Front engine front-wheel drive

Powertrain
- Engine: 851 cc two-cylinder boxer motor 42 or 50 hp at 5000 rpm
- Transmission: 4-speed manual Column mounted control

Dimensions
- Wheelbase: 2,570 mm (101.2 in); 2,800 mm (110.2 in) (pickup)
- Length: 4,570 mm (179.9 in); 4,270 mm (168.1 in) (pickup)
- Width: 1,668 mm (65.7 in)
- Height: 1,430 mm (56.3 in) saloon 1,420 mm (55.9 in) cabriolet 1,645 mm (64.8 in) fourgon
- Curb weight: 710 kg (1,565 lb)−850 kg (1,874 lb)

Chronology
- Predecessor: Panhard Dyna X
- Successor: Panhard PL 17

The Panhard Dyna Z is a lightweight motor car produced by Panhard of France from 1954 to 1959. It was first presented to the press at a Paris restaurant named Les Ambassadeurs on 17 June 1953 and entered production the following year. In 1959, it was replaced by the Panhard PL 17.

== Background ==
Panhard was one of the world's oldest auto manufacturers and, since 1945, had become known for producing economical cars. Like Citroën, Panhard positioned itself as a leader in automotive design, and the Dyna Z featured a range of unusual engineering choices.

In 1955, Citroën had taken a 25% holding in Panhard's automobile business and during the next two years the national dealership networks of the two businesses were integrated. This gave Citroën and Panhard dealers an expanded market coverage, incorporating now a small car, a medium-sized saloon and a large car range. It gave the Panhard Dyna Z, during its final years in production, a level of market access that its predecessor had never enjoyed. Sales benefited.

== Model development ==
The Dyna X was replaced by the more streamlined Dyna Z in 1954. This was later developed into the similar PL 17, launched in 1959, in an attempt to conform to the styles of the time.

Like its predecessor, the Dyna X and the Panhard Dynavia concept that influenced its design, the Dyna Z's body was originally aluminium with steel tube subframes front and rear joined by steel plate reinforcements in the sills. The decision to use aluminium sheeting for car bodies had been taken at a time when a sudden drop off in demand for fighter planes had left the producers with a glut of the metal, but in subsequent years the relative cost advantage of sheet steel had increased steadily. Other sources emphasize an underlying error with the original costings for the model which had taken no account of the off-cuts from the aluminium coils after the blanks for the body panels had been cut from them. Jean Panhard's explanation to a sympathetic interviewer concludes with the observation that "nobody wanted to buy offcuts except at a ridiculously low price, this difference was our profit margin." In Summer 1954, the cost penalty of persisting with aluminium bodywork had become financially unsustainable and, from September 1955, the Dynas Type "Z1" switched to steel bodywork, even though the door shells, trunk/boot and hood/bonnet were at this stage still made of aluminium. The switch to a sheet-steel body shell, attributed to "various setbacks" ("nombreuses déboires") with the aluminium body of the earlier Type Z1, imposed an instant weight penalty of 123 kg. and had to be accompanied by a substantial redesign of the front suspension and a change to the shock absorbers, though cost savings were too late to avoid the need for Panhard to sign their ultimately suicidal refinancing "agreement" with Citroën in April 1955.

By 1958, only the bumpers, the fuel tank, the engine cooling shroud and most of the engine and transaxle cases were aluminium, but the weight was still quite low for a relatively comfortable six-seater saloon, when compared with narrower competitor models from Peugeot and Simca. Its unusual and very modern design gave it a unique combination of space, ride comfort, performance and fuel economy at a very competitive price. But reliability suffered and fuel prices were not high enough, even in France, for people to put energy efficiency first. The car also suffered from some engine and wind noise. The Tiger version had a racing inspired engine and a full cooling shroud.

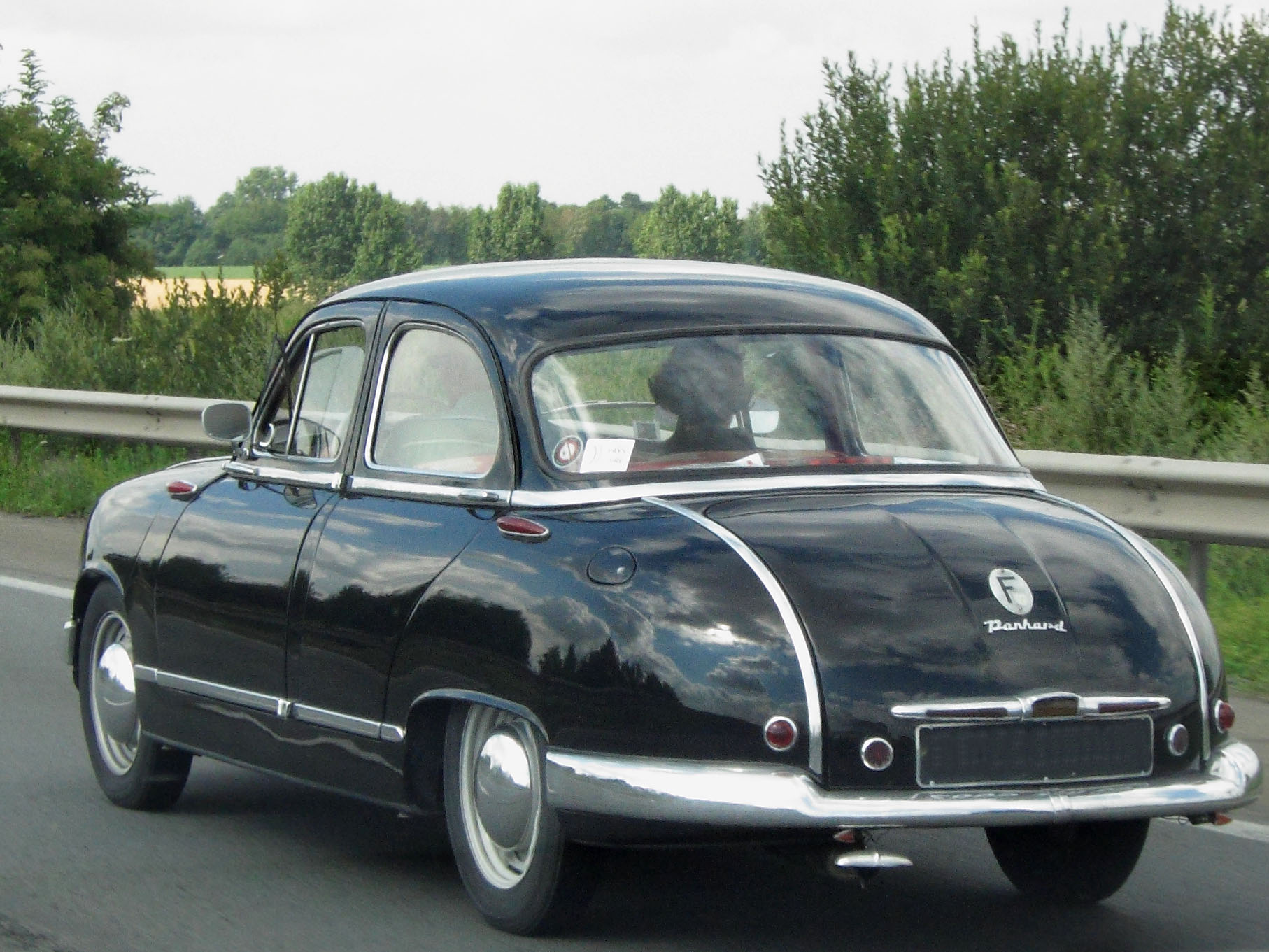
Panhard Dyna Z 4-door saloon

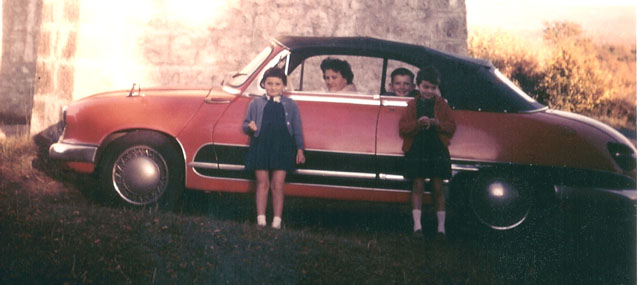
Panhard Dyna Z 2-door cabriolet

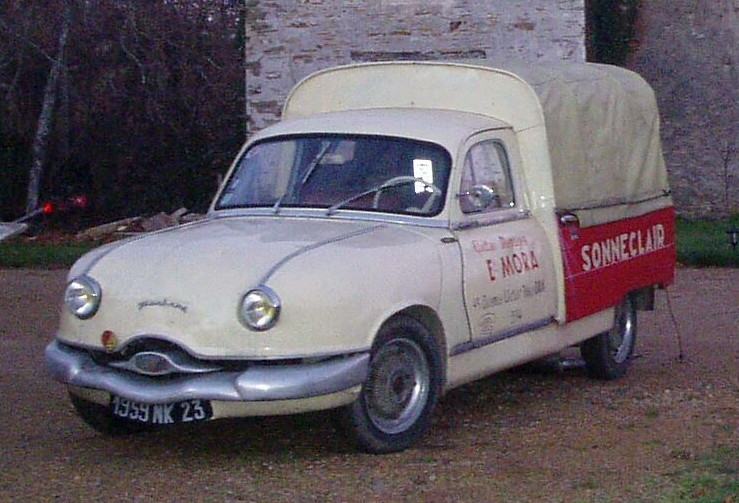
Panhard Dyna Z 2-door pickup

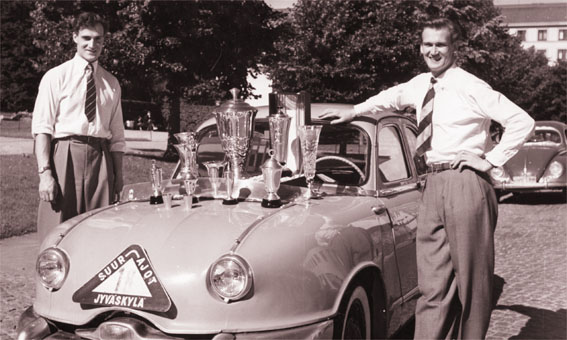
Kalpala brothers and their 1954 1000 Lakes Rally-winning Panhard Dyna Z

== Specifications of 1958 Panhard Dyna Z Tiger ==
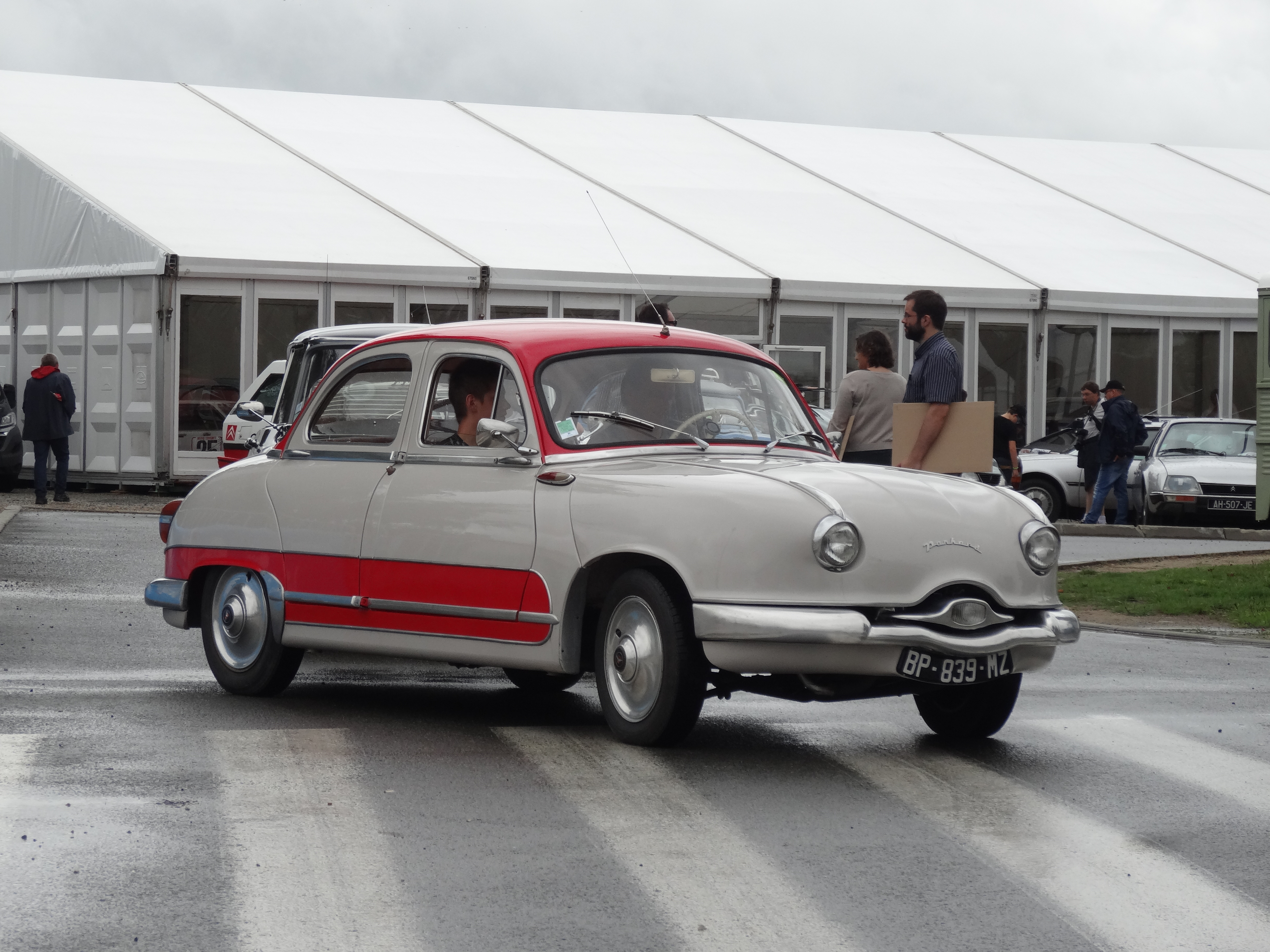
bicolor Dyna Z

Εnhanced specification/performance version as sold in the US:

- Price (USD): $2,000 (comparable to a basic United States car, and midway between prices of a Volkswagen Beetle and a Peugeot 403)
- Engine: 851 cc Flat-twin

— Four-stroke, air-cooled, concentric torsion bar valve springs on roller bearings, hollow aluminum push rods with hardened steel tips, roller main bearings and big end rod bearings of "Panhard Patent" design with an additional set of smaller rollers carrying the roller cage (separator); non-removable cylinder heads, removable steel cylinder liners. The cylinder "jugs" pulled off the crankcase and pistons like those of the VW air-cooled engines. Soft engine mounts to smooth the roughness of the two-cylinder four-stroke engine, radial flow fan bolted to crank shaft, full cooling shroud, aluminum structure and cooling fins. Herringbone timing gears, steel pinion and a "Celcon" phenolic gear running with slight interference fit, permissible due to the flexibility of the "Celcon".

- Power: 50 hp (37 kW). @ 5500 rpm Last years of Tigres, 24s rated 60 hp (45 kW).
- Drive: front wheel drive

— Drive shafts concentric tubes with rubber in the space between the inner and outer tubes. Cardan ("universal") joint at the inner end next to the transaxle, double cardan constant velocity joint at the outer end at the wheel.

- Transmission: cable operated four-speed manual cast aluminum case transaxle with 2nd and 3rd synchromesh, transfer gears and second, third and fourth of "herringbone" design, column shift.

— Unlike most front wheel drive inline engine transaxles, the gearbox is between the engine and the final drive. Engine-clutch-gearbox-final drive, direct drive through gearbox in third gear, fourth "overdrive." Final drive spiral bevel gear on primary shaft, step-down to differential gear through helical (not herringbone) pinion and gear.

- Clutch: conventional friction clutch, cable operated. Optional in some markets: magnetic clutch filled with iron "filings".

— When a coil fixed to the casing was energized, the "filings" stiffened between the rotating casing on the crankshaft and the driving disc fixed to the gearbox input shaft. The electricity supplied by a special double generator, one set of windings supplying the battery and the rest of the electrical system, the other set of windings powering the magnetic clutch. As the engine accelerated above idle speed, the generator (not an "alternator" type) began energizing the magnetic clutch, gradually connecting the crankshaft with the primary shaft of the gearbox.

- Weight: 816 kg (1,799 lb) - original 1954 Dyna 649 kg (1,431 lb).
- Fuel mileage: 30–40 mpg [The difference between Imperial and US (231 cu.in.) is only 20%, not enough to make much difference in a rating as mushy as fuel mileage.]
- Top Speed: 145 km/h (90 mph).
- Calculated: 58.7 hp./litre, 40 pounds / hp.
- Steering: rack and pinion mounted behind front suspension, short steering shaft.
- Front suspension: upper and lower transverse leaf springs, curved downward to raise roll centre. Generous ground clearance and travel. No antisway bar, which resulted in the lifting of one rear wheel in hard cornering. Kingpins integral with the steering knuckles, turning in sockets pivoted on the leaf spring eyes.
- Rear suspension: Torsion bars acting on trailing link-arms and joined and pivoted (between torsion bar ends) diagonal semi-trailing arms, described as "semi-independent"; This gave similar geometry but less unsprung weight than a solid (tube) axle. The axle a continuous tube between rear wheel spindles, V-shaped and fastened in the center by a rubber bushing mounted on the subframe cross member. The torsion bars in sets of three, one set for each side of the rear axle. No antisway bar.
- Body: steel (earlier models had aluminum bodies), streamlined, four doors, low drag despite flat recessed side glass, front and rear window rubber gaskets, rain gutters
- Seating capacity: 6. Column shift and bench seats.
- Brakes: drum, all outboard, very light pedal pressure despite no power assistance. On later models, cast aluminium alloy brake drums with replaceable iron liners pinned in place, later cars' drums finned. The open centre rims bolted to ears on the periphery of the drums.
- Most of the cars exported to the United States lacked the centre fog light shown in the photographs.
