= Émile Levassor =

French engineer (1843–1897)

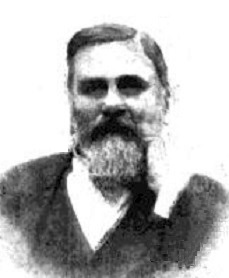
- Born: 21 January 1843; Marolles-en-Hurepoix, France
- Died: 14 April 1897 (aged 54); Paris, France
- Education: École Centrale Paris
- Occupation: automobile industry
- Spouse: Louise Sarazin

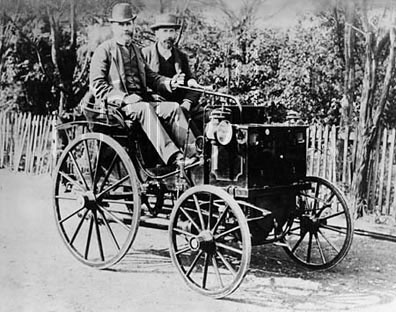
Panhard et Levassor (1890–1895)

Émile Constant Levassor (21 January 1843 – 14 April 1897) was a French engineer and a pioneer of the automobile industry and car racing in France.

== Biography ==
Levassor was born in Marolles-en-Hurepoix. After studying engineering and graduating from École Centrale Paris, he started his career in 1872 in a company that produced wood-working machines, where he met René Panhard. The company also built gas engines and when, in 1886, a Belgian industrialist Edouard Sarazin got a licence to build Daimler engines he chose Levassor to build them in France. When Sarazin died in 1887, Levassor married his widow, Louise, and together with Panhard they started building cars. Levassor, Peugeot and Daimler all met in 1888 at Peugeot's Valentigny Factory to share their knowledge, a summit that led Levassor and Peugeot to cooperate in experimenting with Daimler and Benz engines. However, Levassor gave more thought to the design and operation of the new car than had Benz, Daimler or Peugeot, all of whom had been more concerned with introducing a successful engine into what was still basically a small carriage.

The Panhard of 1891, with an engine built under Daimler licence, introduced a series of innovations that effectively created the modern car. Levassor moved the engine from the rear to the front of the car and cooled it via a front-mounted water radiator rather than relying, as had been customary, on "evaporative cooling", i.e. extracting heat by allowing the circulating water to boil. (Note: This is why early cars, e.g. Benz, had a prodigious water consumption. On von Liebig's journey of 940 km by Benz Viktoria in 1894, water consumption was up to 150 litres / 100 km = 2 mpg; see https://automuseum-stuttgart.de/fernfahrt-des-baron-von-liebieg-vor-125-jahren/) He also introduced a crankshaft to link the engine with the gearing, eschewing the bicycle-style belt drive of previous cars; and he installed a clutch pedal and a gear stick, situated between the seats, to operate the gearbox, thus creating the first modern transmission. The siting of the engine on the front of the car rather than the rear provided far more room for passengers. (Note: Levassor followed in the footsteps of Amédée Bollée, whose La Mancelle steam car of 1878 (and its successors) had the engine at the front with vertical cylinders, a crankshaft to drive the rear wheels and independent suspension of all four wheels.) The resultant configuration – unfortunately for Levassor – was soon called the systeme Panhard.

Levassor also took part in motor racing, finishing fifth in Paris to Rouen race in 1894, and arriving first in (but not winning) the Paris–Bordeaux–Paris race the following year (both in his own cars).

== Personal life ==
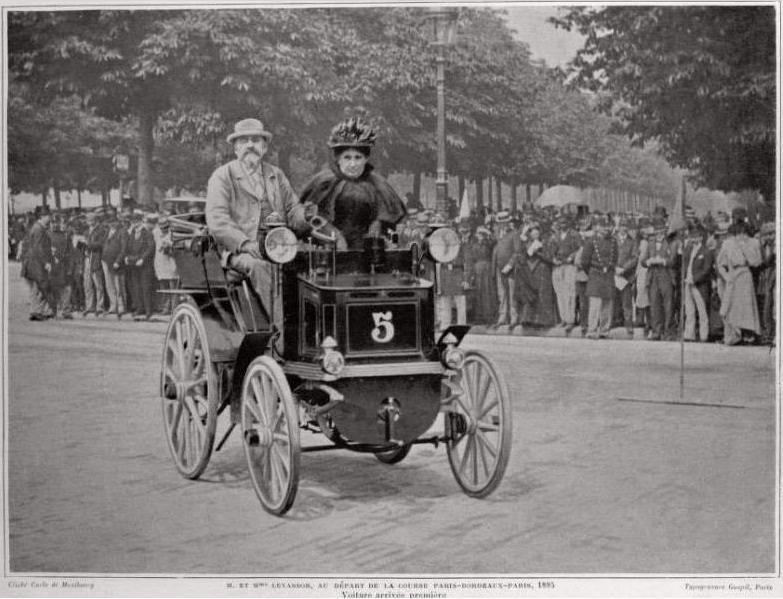
Émile Levassor and Louise Sarazin-Levassor at the start of the 1895 Paris-Bordeaux-Paris.

In May 1890 Emile Levassor married Mme. Louise Sarazin, the widow of Edouard Sarazin, an influential and entrepreneurial Patents lawyer who owned licences for Deutz and Daimler engine manufacture. Both types of engine were manufactured in Paris by Perin, Panhard & Cie and Panhard & Levassor.

== Death ==
In 1896, when taking part in the 1896 Paris–Marseille–Paris race, he was seriously injured in a crash while trying to avoid hitting a dog. He never recovered from the injury, and died in Paris the following year.

== See also ==
- Monument to the Glory of Émile Levassor
- Motorsport before 1906
- Arthur Constantin Krebs
- 1889 – "Première voiture de course"
