= Panhard (disambiguation) =

Panhard is a French automotive company.

Panhard may also refer to:

  - Panhard rod (Panhard suspension, Panhard) a suspension link originated by Panhard
- Panhard Nunatak (Panhard Ridge), Antarctica
- René Panhard (1841-1908) French automotive engineer
