= Monument to the Glory of Émile Levassor =

Monument in Paris, France

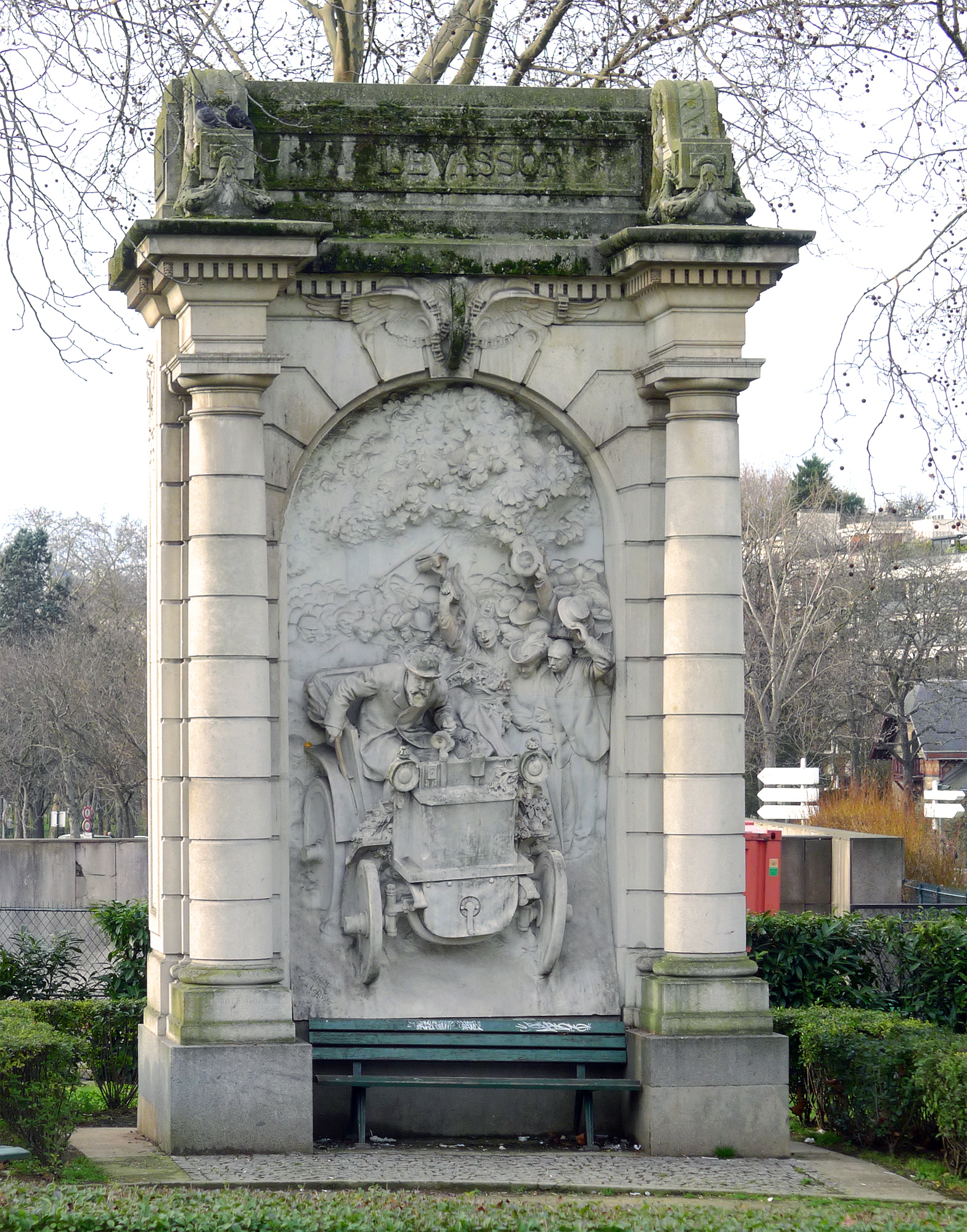
- The monument in 2013.
- Interactive map of Monument to the Glory of Émile Levassor
- Location: Alexandre and René Parodi Square, 16th arrondissement, Paris, France
- Coordinates: 48.876628°N 2.280338°E
- Designer: Jules Dalou; Camille Lefèvre
- Type: Monument
- Opening date: 26 November 1907
- Dedicated to: Émile Levassor

The Monument to the Glory of Émile Levassor (French: Monument à la gloire d'Émile Levassor), also known as The Triumph of Levassor (French: Le Triomphe de Levassor), is a sculpture in Paris, France, placed in the Alexandre and René Parodi Square, near Admiral Bruix Boulevard, in the 16th arrondissement of Paris. It is dedicated to Émile Levassor, an engineer and a pioneer of the automobile industry and car racing in France, and commemorates him crossing the finish line first in the 1895 Paris–Bordeaux–Paris Trail, which is sometimes considered the first automotive race in history. It was designed by Jules Dalou and Camille Lefèvre, and unveiled on 26 November 1907, at the entrance to the Bois de Boulogne park. In 1972 it was moved to its current location.

== History ==
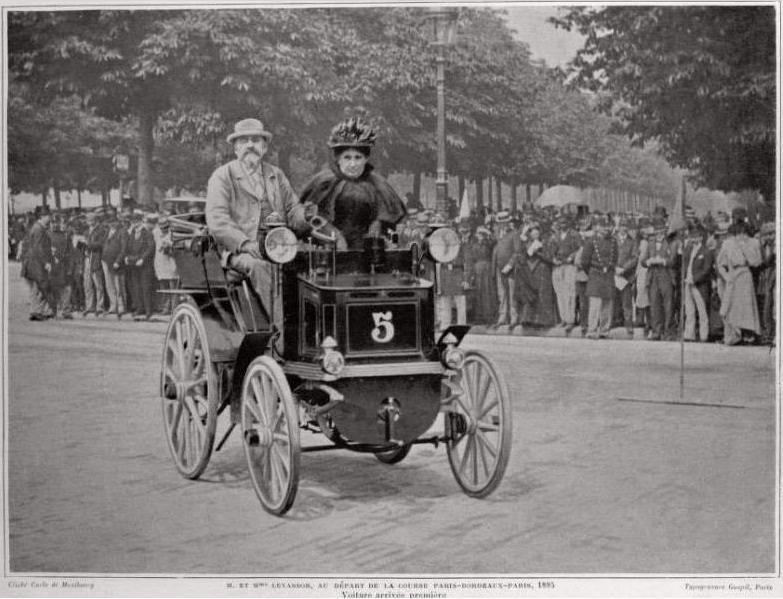
Émile Levassor and Louise Sarazin-Levassor at the start of the 1895 Paris–Bordeaux–Paris Trail

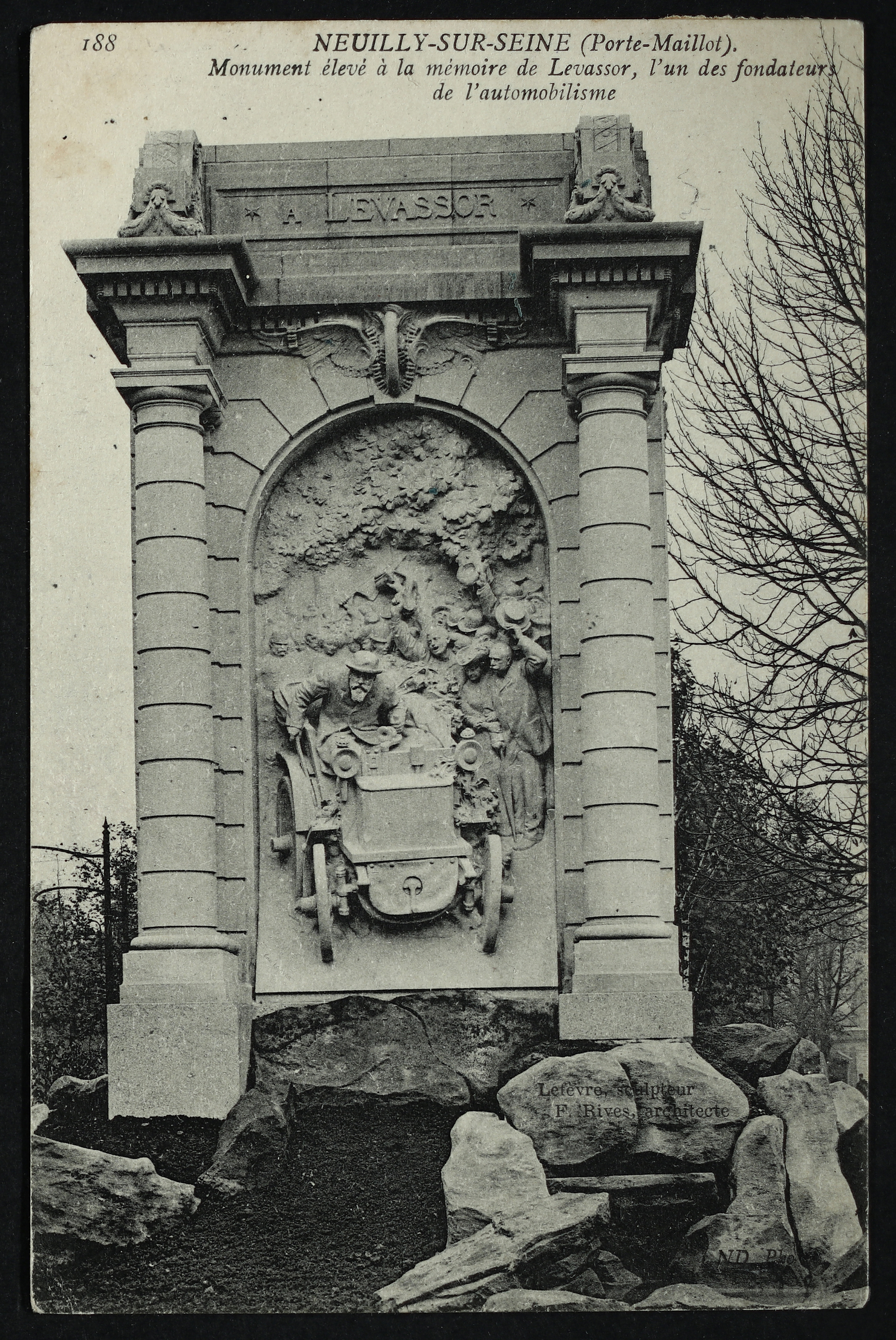
The monument in the 1900s

The monument was dedicated to Émile Levassor, an engineer and a pioneer of the automobile industry and car racing in France, and commemorated him crossing the finish line first in the 1895 Paris–Bordeaux–Paris Trail, which is sometimes considered the first automotive race in history. It was commissioned by Automobile Club of France in 1898, a year after his death. Work on the monument was begun by the sculptor Jules Dalou, and following his death in 1902, it was continued by one of his students, Camille Lefèvre, who based it on his drawings. The monument was unveiled on 26 November 1907, at the entrance to the Bois de Boulogne park.

In 1972, due to the construction of the Peripheral Boulevard, the monument was moved to Alexandre and René Parodi Square, near Admiral Bruix Boulevard, in the 16th arrondissement of Paris.

== Characteristics ==
It has a form of a large tall stone cuboid that is styled to resemble a triumphal arch with two columns placed in front of it. In the centre is featured a relief titled The Triumph of Levassor (French: Le Triomphe de Levassor). It depicts Émile Levassor driving a 1895 Panhard et Levassor automobile, with the racing number 5 written on its front, and decorated with laurel branches. Behind and to his right is depicted a cheering crowd of people, with men waving their hats in the air. Above them are branches of a tree. On top of the arch, above the relief, is a keystone sculpture of a car wheel with wings.

== Gallery ==
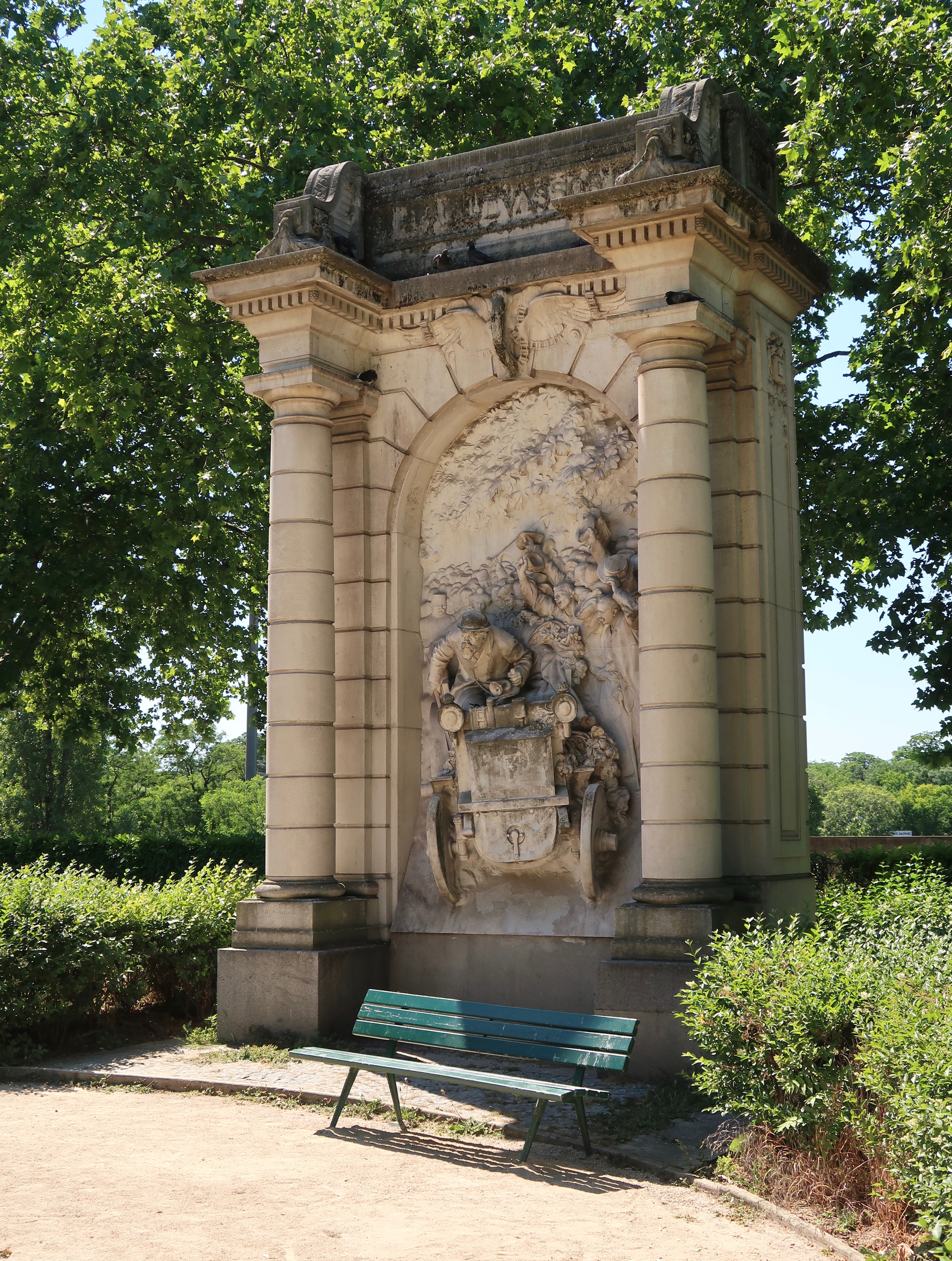
Monument as seen from the side

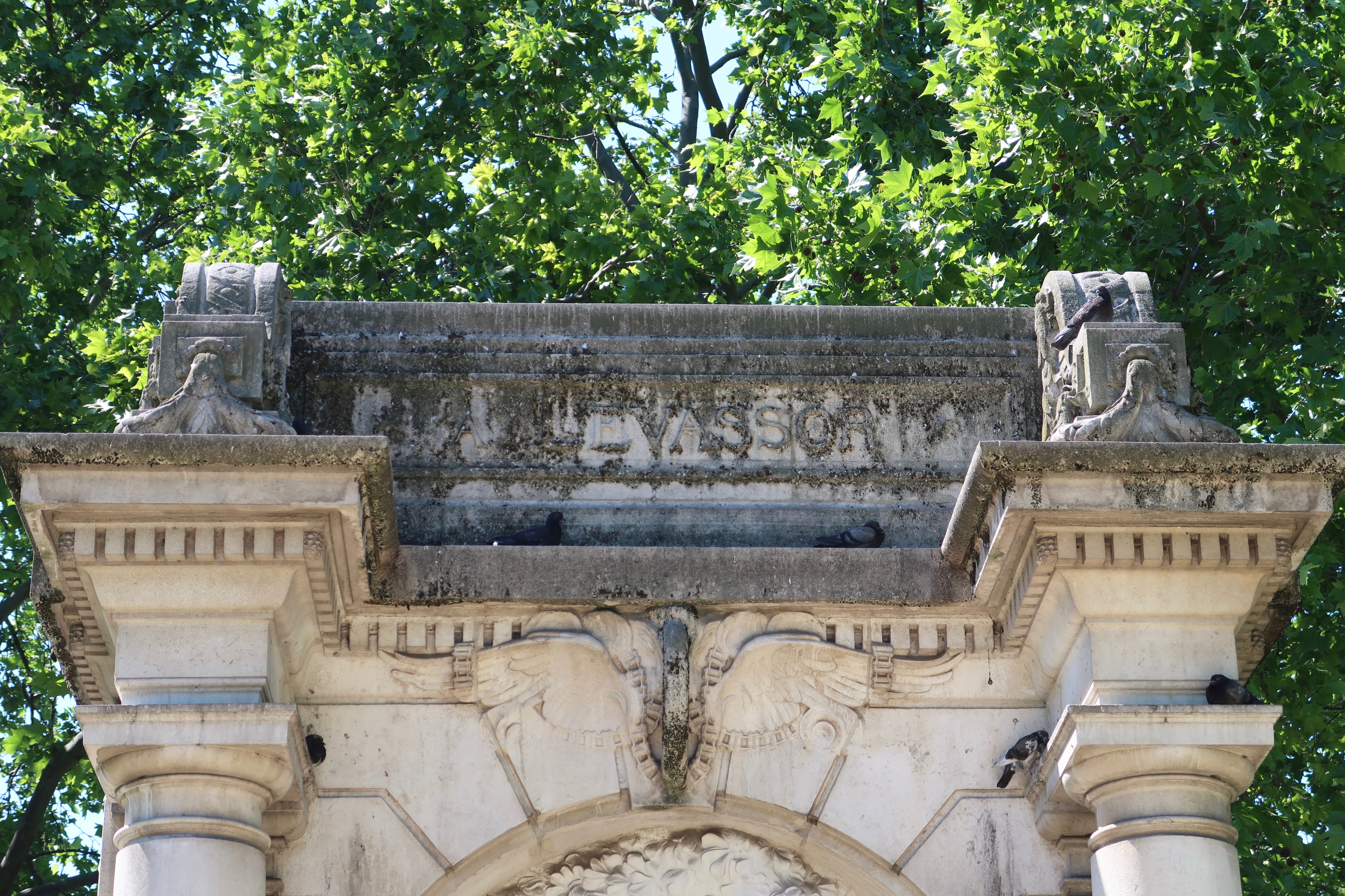
The details on the top of the monument

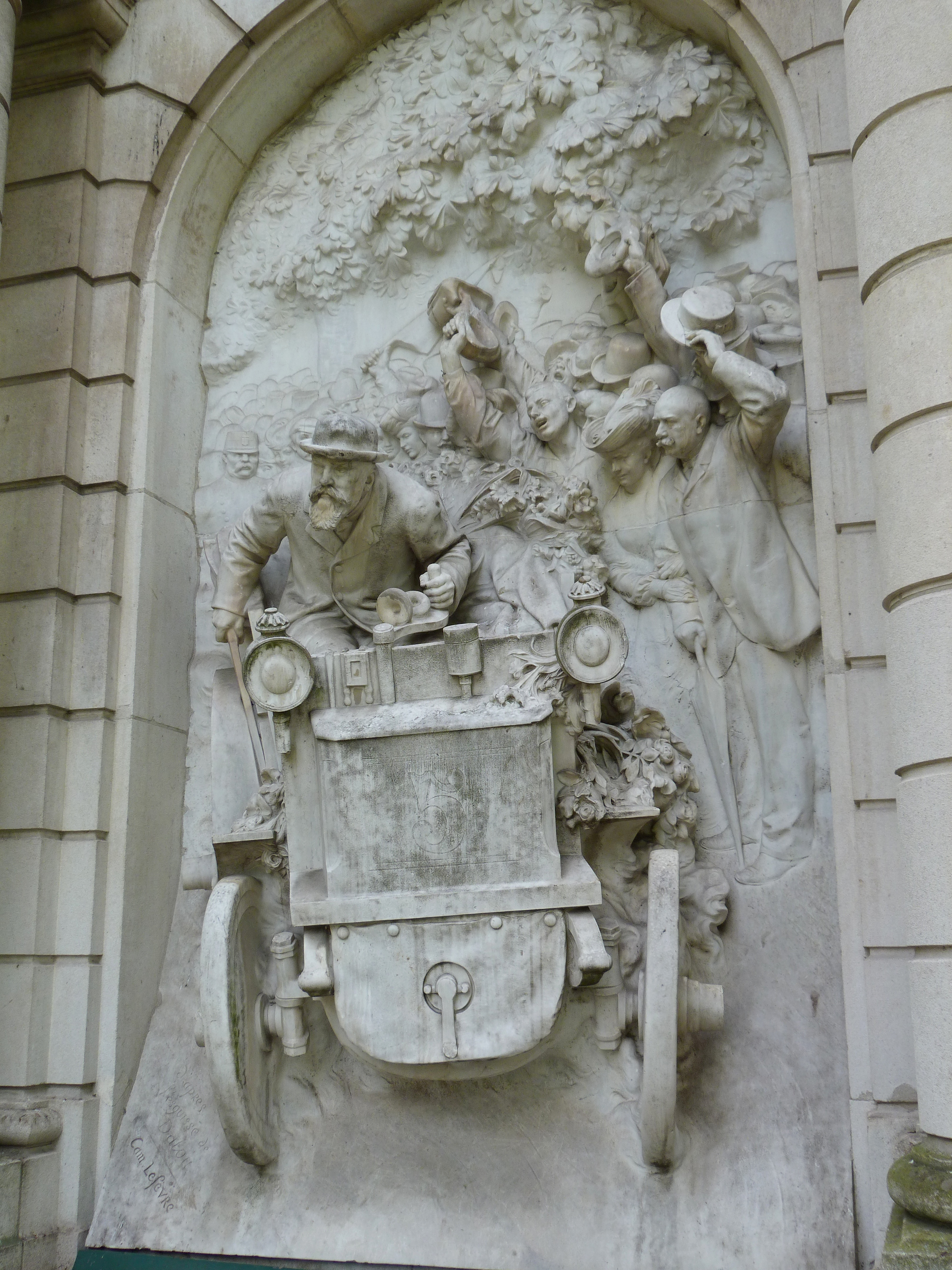
The relief

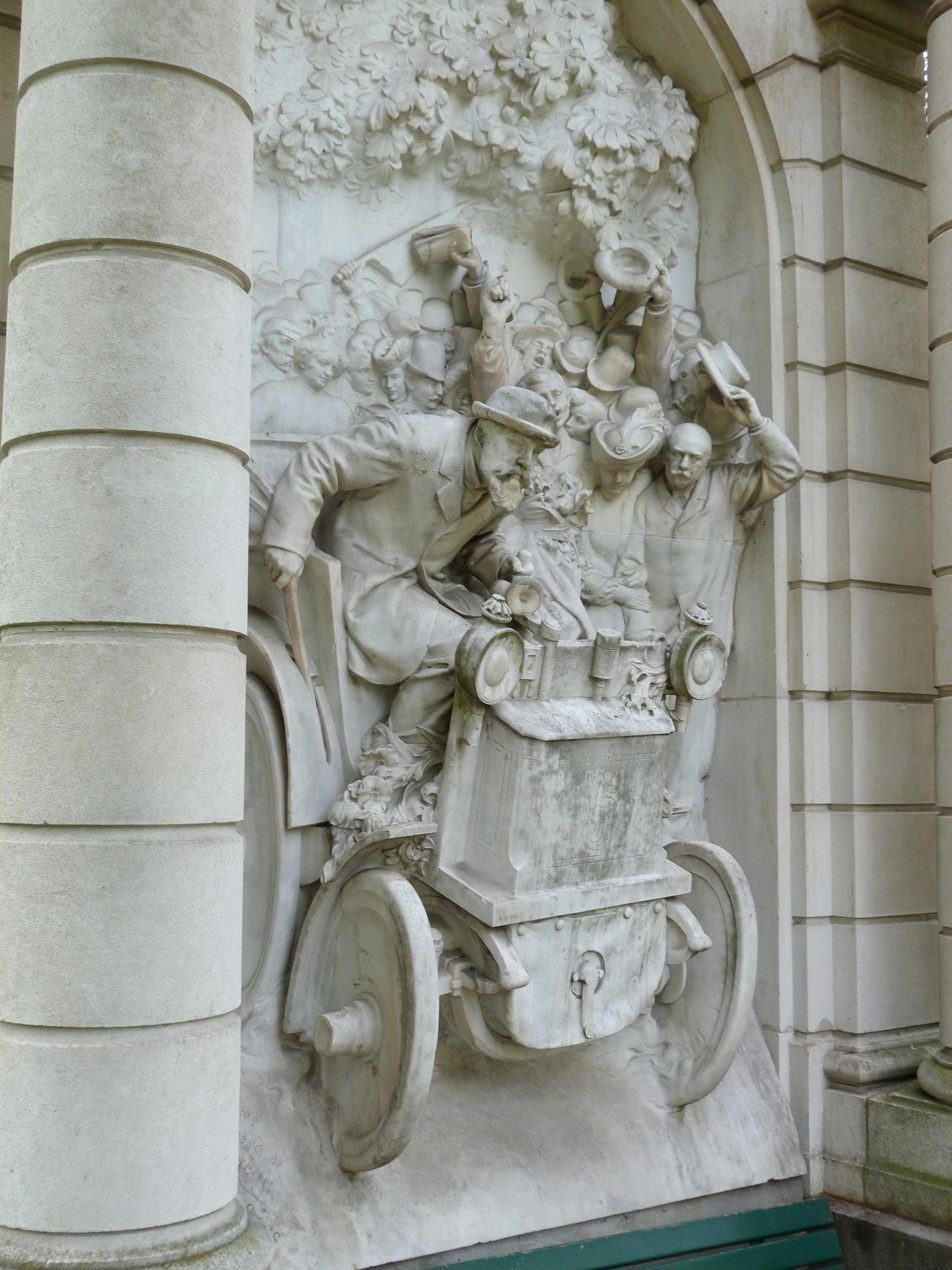
The relief
