= De Boisse =

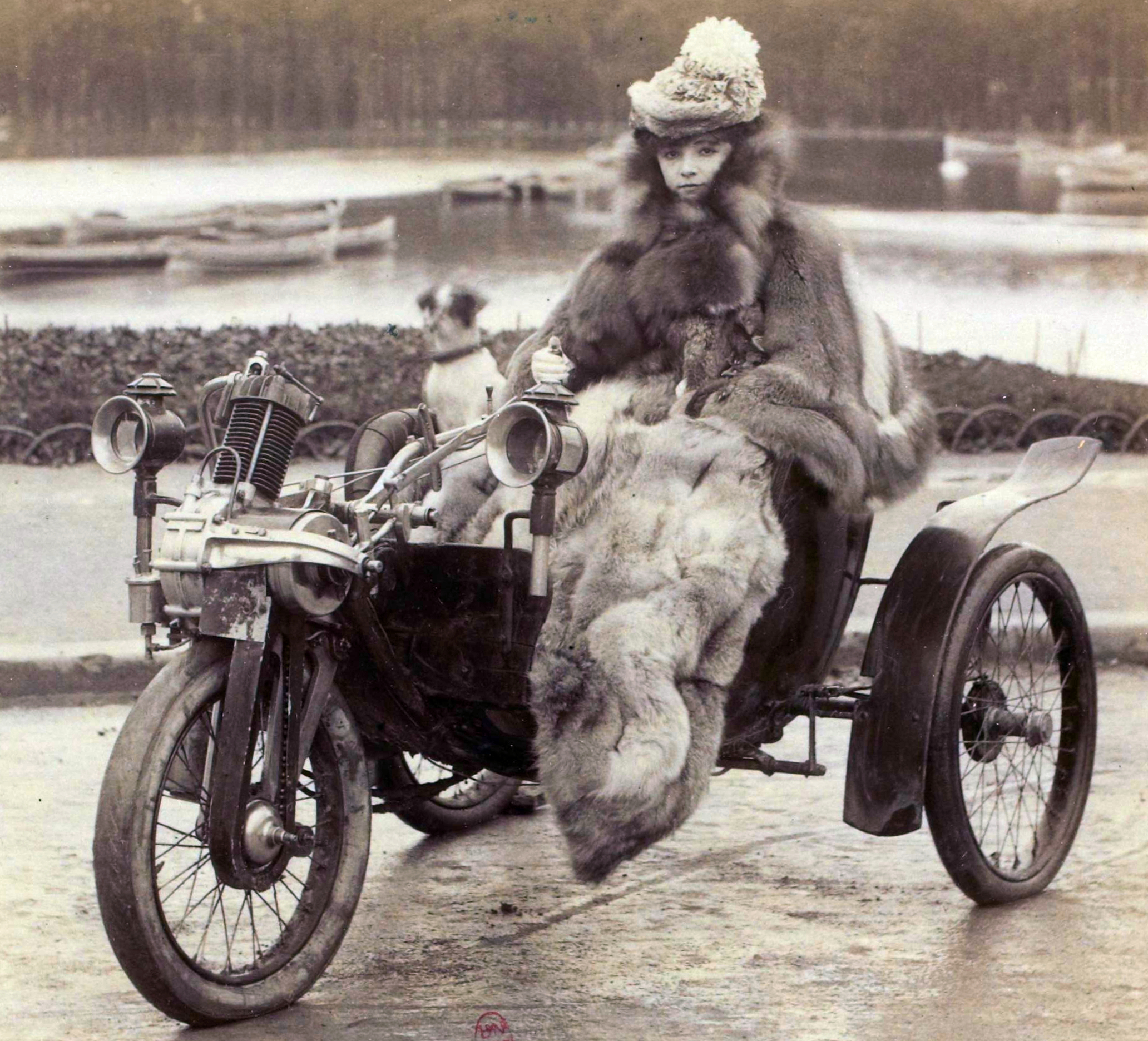
La Belle Époque 1901 De Boisse tricycle with tiller steering

The De Boisse (possibly a.k.a. Denis de Boisse), was a French automobile manufactured from 1901 until 1904 by Jacques de Boisse in Paris.

== Company ==
The company was based in Paris, (one source states in the 11th arrondissement). It manufactured automobiles from 1900 to 1904. Several sources agree on 'De Boisse as the brand name, but one also mentions 'Denis De Boisse'. One source states that De Boisse ceased production in 1904. It remains unclear whether that was one person, several people or a company name. Possible activities of the company before 1900 or after 1904 are not known.

== Vehicles ==
=== 1901 ===
The first model was a tricycle. The single-cylinder engine was water-cooled. It was mounted above the single front wheel and drove it via a chain. It was steered with a long tiller (lever). The open body offered space for two people. De Boisse competed in the 1901 Paris–Bordeaux motor race, but did not finish.

=== 1902 ===
In 1902 a conventional four-wheel model appeared. It had a 6 hp De Dion-Bouton inboard engine with a shaft drive. According to two sources, the rear axle was designed as a De Dion axle.

=== 1903 ===
In 1903, two vehicles took part in the Paris–Madrid race, subsequently known as the "Race of Death". Jacques De Boisse was classified 87th out of 99 finishers, completing in 12 hours, 0 minutes, 55 seconds. Monsieur Dupeux was classified 98th, completing in 16 hours, 18 minutes, 10 seconds.

=== 1904 ===
In 1904 the final model featured a two-cylinder, 12 hp, De Dion-Bouton engine. A source describes a light car with a 12 hp twin-cylinder engine and a patented 'double rear axle'.

== See also ==
- Louise Sarazin
