= Hôtel de Ville, Saint-Michel-sur-Orge =

Town hall in Saint-Michel-sur-Orge, France

Hôtel de Ville
- The main frontage of the Hôtel de Ville in August 2026

General information
- Type: City hall
- Architectural style: Neoclassical style
- Location: Saint-Michel-sur-Orge, France
- Coordinates: 48.6303°N 2.3025°E
- Completed: c.1750

The Hôtel de Ville (French pronunciation: [otɛl də vil], City Hall) is a municipal building in Saint-Michel-sur-Orge, Essonne, in the southern suburbs of Paris, standing on Rue de l'Église.

== History ==
Following the French Revolution, the new town council led by the mayor, Sulpice Bouzinard, established their first meeting place in a room in the "Petit Château", a property owned by Françoise Jeanne Taschereau, who was the widow of Field Marshal Marie-Jacques de Bréhant, marquis de Bréhant.

In 1810, the council relocated to its second home, a combined town hall and school on the corner of Grande Rue (now Rue des Fusillés de la Résistance) and Rue des Tiphoines, and in 1838, it moved to its third home, a house on the corner of what is now Place du Docteur Beuchard and Grande Rue (now Rue des Fusillés de la Résistance). Next, in 1856, it moved to a fourth home, the first floor of the boys' school on Rue d'Enfer, and, in 1928, it transferred to its fifth home, a large house on Rue de Montlhéry. After that, in 1932, it moved to its sixth home, the former municipal girls' school on what is now Place du 19 Mars 1962: this building had become vacant when the girls moved to join the boys at the school building on Rue de Montlhéry. After the building was no longer required for municipal use, the sixth town hall became the Maison des Seniors.

In the early 1970s, following significant population growth, the council led by the mayor, Jean-Loup Englander, decided to acquire a more substantial property. The building they selected, their seventh home, was the Propriété Zeiller-Solacroup on Rue de l'Église. The building had been designed in the neoclassical style, built in brick with a cement render finish and probably dated from the mid-18th century. It originally consisted of only one block on the south side of the existing courtyard. After the French Revolution, the property was acquired by the future mayor, Ange Dutrou. It served as his home until 1836, when it was bought by a director of a glassmaking factory in Choisy-le-Roi, Sieur Launay. In 1879, it was acquired by the chief engineer of the Orléans Railway Company, Émile Solacroup, who added the west-facing wing. The property was further extended by his daughter, Yvonne Zeiller, before she died in 1962. After a major programme of conversion works had been completed, the building was re-opened as the town hall on 22 June 1974.

As part of the works, the former drawing room and the former library were converted to create the Salle des Mariages (wedding room). A further programme of works to improve the landscaping in front of the town hall was undertaken at a cost of €1.3 million in 2019.

== Sources ==
- Rigault, Sophie (2024). "Saint-Michel-sur-Orge: Les maires et mairies de la Révolution à nos jours" (PDF). Town of Saint-Michel-sur-Orge.
