= Canton of Brétigny-sur-Orge =

Coordinates: 48.61°N 2.30°E

The canton of Brétigny-sur-Orge is an administrative division of the Essonne department, Île-de-France region, northern France. Its borders were modified at the French canton reorganisation which came into effect in March 2015. Its seat is in Brétigny-sur-Orge.

It consists of the following communes:

1. Brétigny-sur-Orge
2. Leudeville
3. Longpont-sur-Orge
4. Marolles-en-Hurepoix
5. Saint-Michel-sur-Orge
6. Saint-Vrain
