= Louise Sarazin =

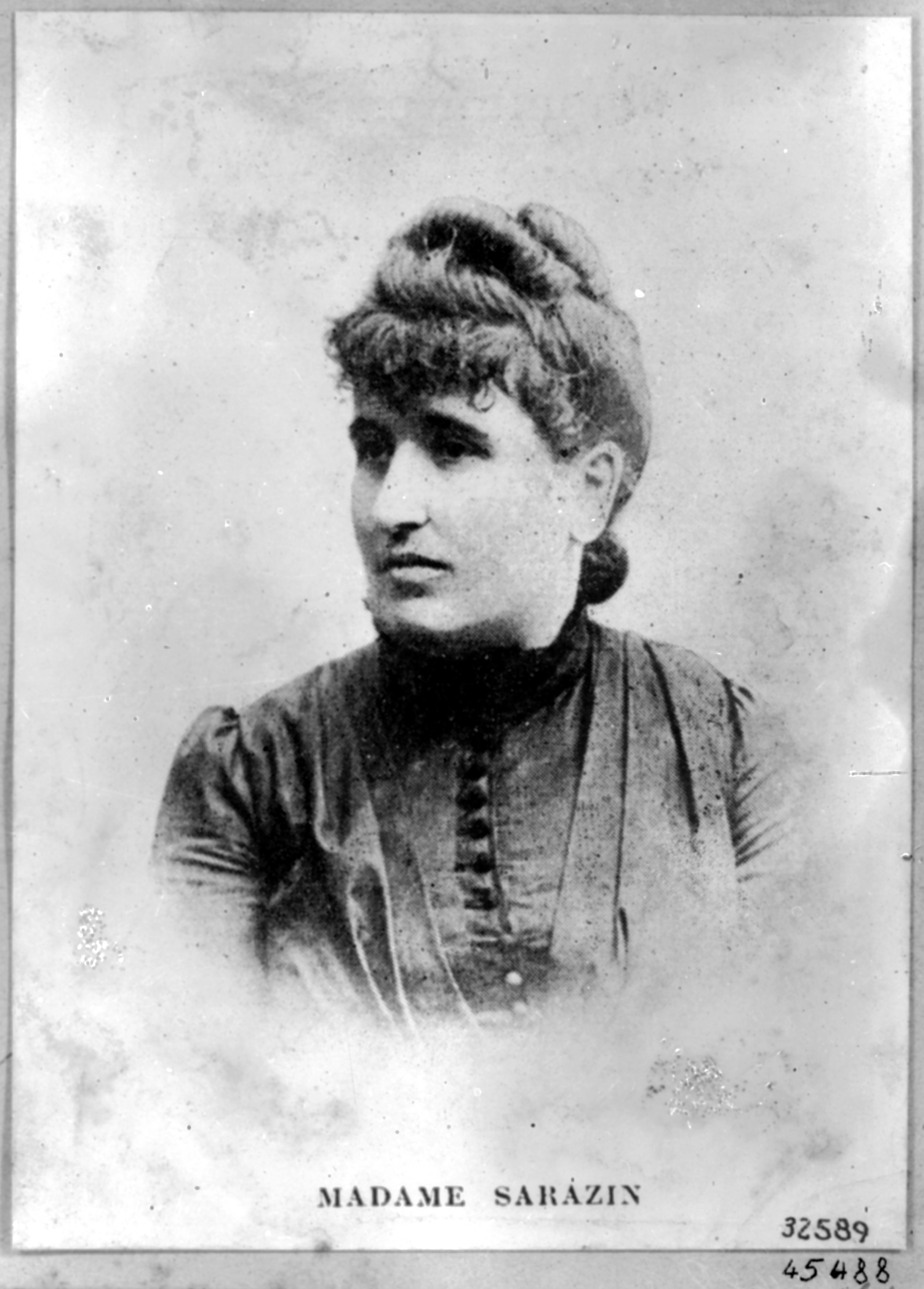
Louise Sarazin

Louise Sarazin (also known as Louise Sarazin-Levassor), (November 6, 1847, Foix, † 16 October 1916, Paris), played a significant role in early automotive history having been party to its beginnings in France and Germany. She was the wife of Edouard Sarazin, an entrepreneurial Belgian industrialist and patents lawyer who was in a number of automotive partnerships and agencies with Émile Levassor, René Panhard, John Cockerill, Deutz AG, Gottlieb Daimler and Wilhelm Maybach. In 1884 Sarazin acquired the licence to build Deutz engines in France, which he duly contracted to Perin, Panhard & Cie in Paris. Around 1886 he similarly acquired licences to build Daimler engines in France and started to commission Panhard & Levassor in Paris. After his death in 1887 his widow Louise developed the business relationships and negotiated the partnerships with Daimler and 'Panhard et Levassor'. In 1890 she married Emile Levassor.

== Early life ==
Louise Cayrol was born in 1847 in Foix, in the département of Ariège in southern France. Her parents were Antoine Cayrol and Jeanne Cayrol (nee Bonnafous), and her sister was named Anne.

In 1870, in Paris, she married Edouard Sarazin, a patents lawyer from Liège, Belgium. They had three children, daughter Jeanne (1878 - 1896) and sons Auguste Henri (b. 1880 in Asnières-sur-Seine) and René (b. 21 February 1887 in Paris).

== Automotive industry ==
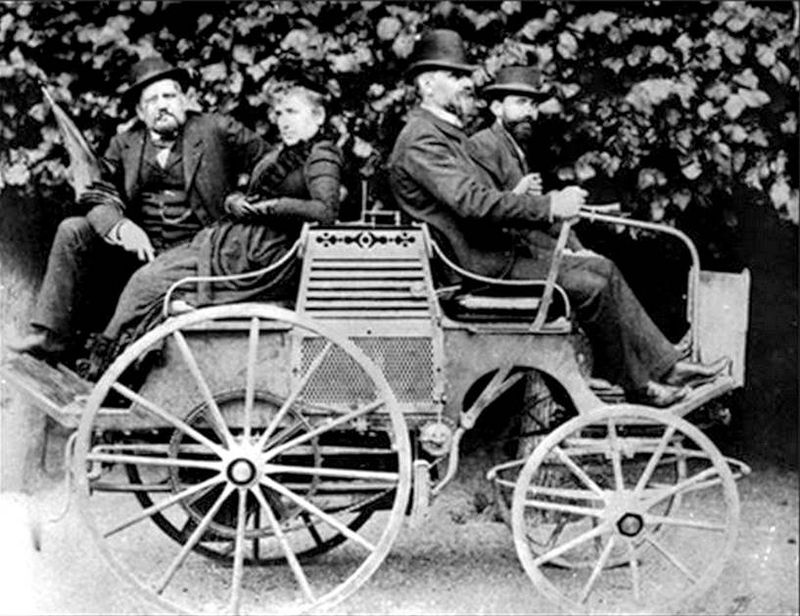
Louise Sarazin (left) with René Panhard, in front Émile Levassor and the Workshop manager Émile Mayade (1891).

Edouard Sarazin was an entrepreneurial industrialist, patents lawyer and pioneer of automotive engineering, who was in a mix of automotive partnerships and agencies with Émile Levassor, John Cockerill, Deutz AG, and Gottlieb Daimler. In 1884 Sarazin, the representative of the German company Gasmotorenfabrik Otto & Langen (Deutz AG) acquired the licence to build Deutz engines in France, which he duly contracted to Perin, Panhard & Cie in Paris. Around 1886/7 he similarly acquired licences to build Daimler engines in France, and to conform to French Patent Law he commissioned Panhard & Levassor to produce "some" Daimler engines in Paris. His untimely death in 1887 left his widow to develop the business relationships and complete the partnership with Daimler. On February 5, 1889, she signed a contract in which Daimler received 12% of the sales price of all engines produced in France and she received 20% from Panhard & Levassor.

=== Death-bed wish ===
Sarazin's deathbed words to his wife were: "In your own interests, and for the good of our children, I recommend that you maintain the business connection with Daimler. His invention is entirely trustworthy, and it will have a future, the magnitude of which we cannot begin to imagine today."

He also asked that she maintain the relationship with Levassor and Panhard.

== Levassor ==
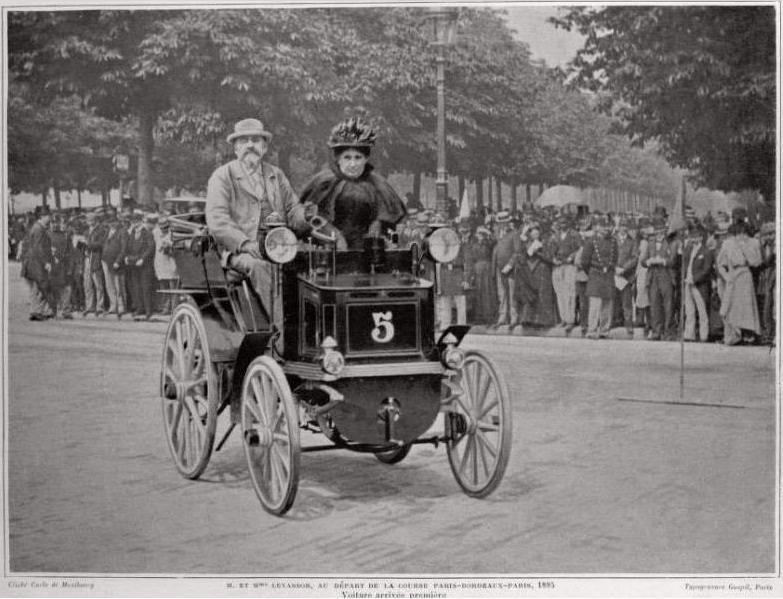
Émile Levassor and Louise Sarazin-Levassor at the start of the 1895 Paris-Bordeaux-Paris.

In May 1890 Mme. Louise Sarazin married Émile Levassor.

During the 1896 Paris–Marseille–Paris race, he swerved to avoid a dog, crashed and was seriously injured. He never fully recovered and died in Paris the following year.

== Literature ==
- Reinhard Seiffert: Die Ära Gottlieb Daimlers. Neue Perspektiven zur Frühgeschichte des Automobils und seiner Technik. Vieweg+Teubner, Wiesbaden 2009, ISBN 978-3-8348-0962-9.
- Reinhard Seiffert: The era of Gottlieb Daimler. New perspectives on the early history of the automobile and its technology. Vieweg + Teubner, Wiesbaden 2009, ISBN 978-3-8348-0962-9 .

== See also ==
- De Boisse, part-owned by Levassor / Sarazin
