= Saint-Michel-sur-Orge =

Commune in Île-de-France, France

- Commune
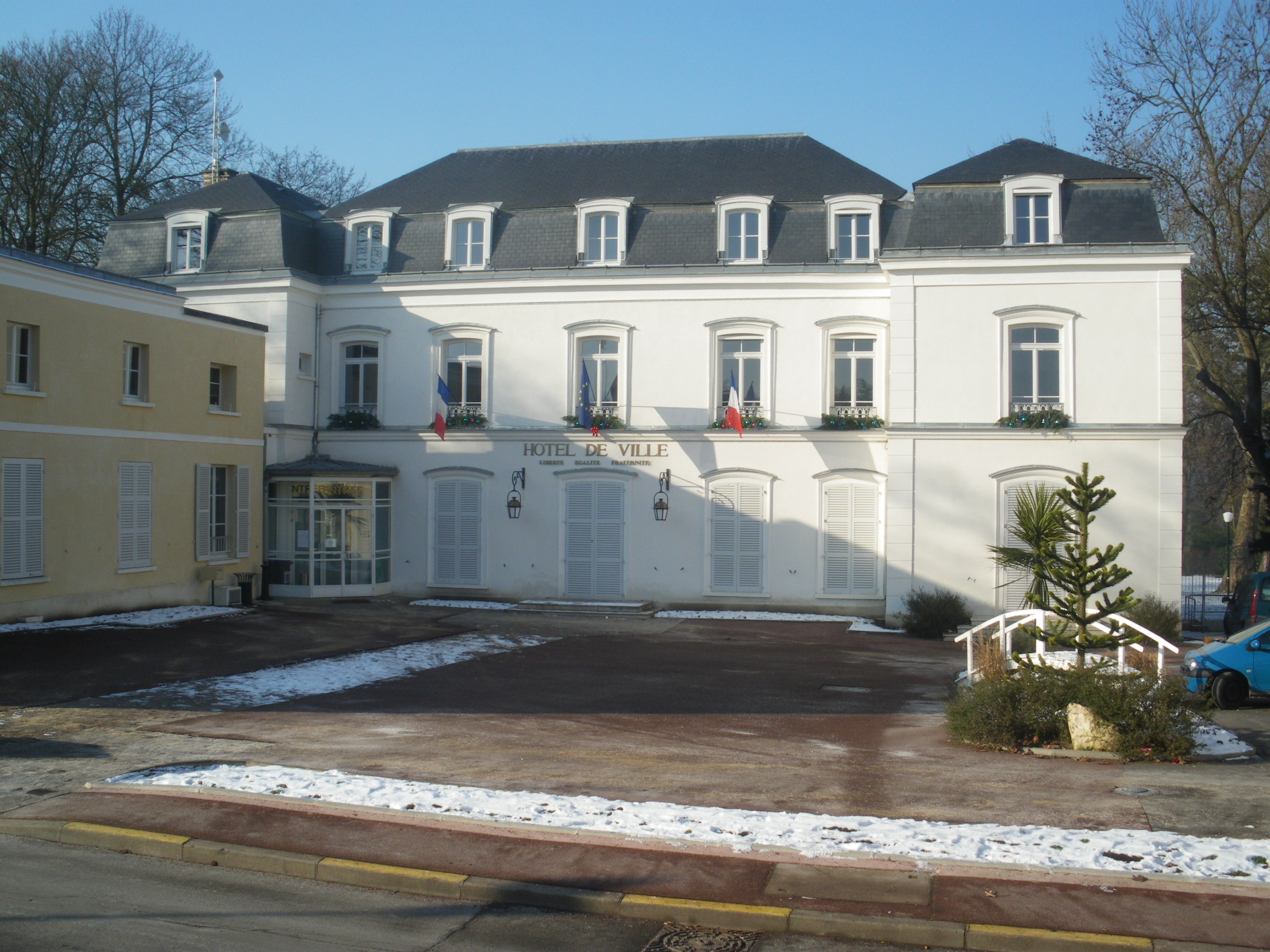
- The Hôtel de Ville

- Coat of arms

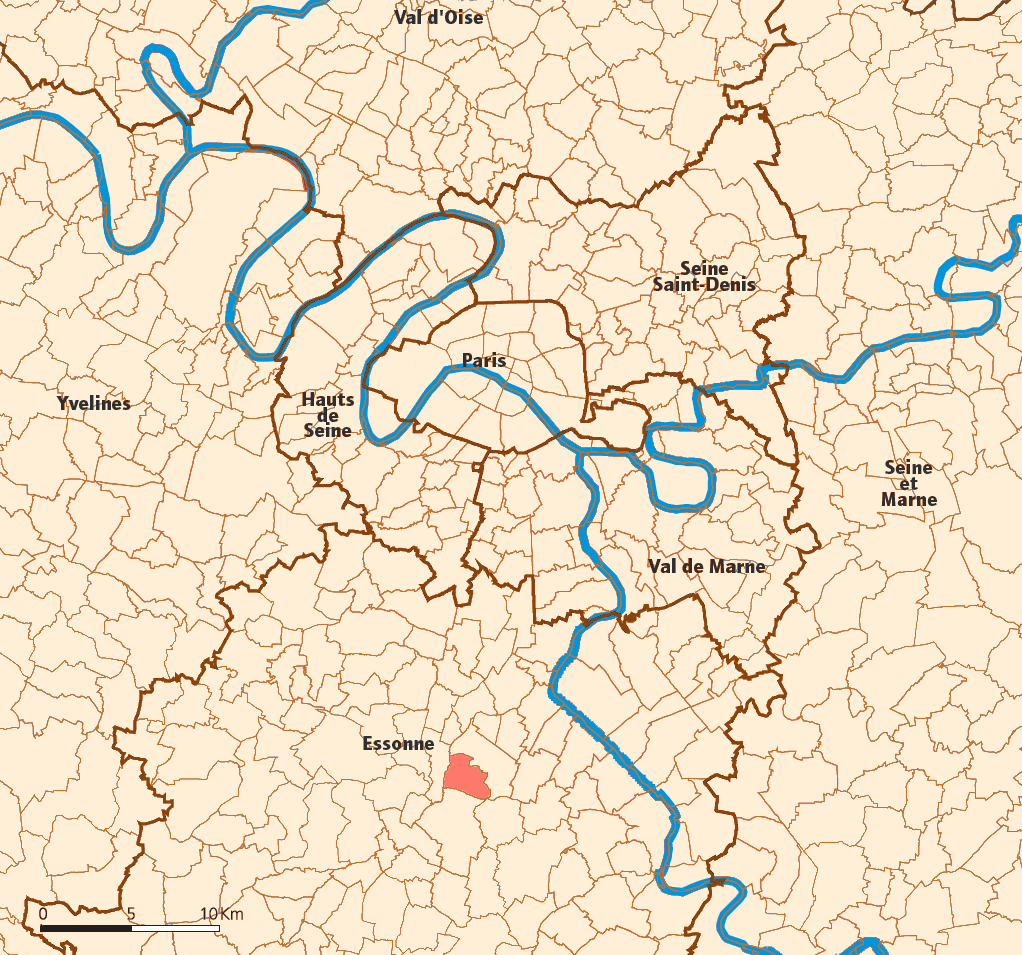
- Location (in red) within Paris inner and outer suburbs
- Location of Saint-Michel-sur-Orge
- Location within France Location within Île-de-France (region)
- Coordinates: 48°37′49″N 2°18′09″E
- Country: France
- Region: Île-de-France
- Department: Essonne
- Arrondissement: Palaiseau
- Canton: Brétigny-sur-Orge
- Intercommunality: CA Cœur d'Essonne

Government
  - Mayor (2020–2026): Sophie Rigault
- Area^{1}: 5.29 km^{2} (2.04 sq mi)
- Highest elevation: 91 m (299 ft)
- Lowest elevation: 38 m (125 ft)
- Population (2023): 21,776
  - Density: 4,120/km^{2} (10,700/sq mi)
- Demonym: Saint-Michellois
- Time zone: UTC+01:00 (CET)
  - Summer (DST): UTC+02:00 (CEST)
- INSEE/Postal code: 91570 /91240
- ^{1} French Land Register data, which excludes lakes, ponds, glaciers > 1 km^{2} (0.386 sq mi or 247 acres) and river estuaries.

Saint-Michel-sur-Orge (French pronunciation: [sɛ̃ miʃɛl syʁ ɔʁʒ]; lit. 'St Michel-on-Orge') is a commune in the Essonne department of France. It is in the southern outer suburbs of Paris, 24.7 km (15.3 mi) from the centre of Paris.

Inhabitants of Saint-Michel-sur-Orge are known as Saint-Michellois (masculine) and Saint-Michelloises (feminine) in French.

== History ==
The Hôtel de Ville probably dates from the mid-18th century.

== Transport ==
Saint-Michel-sur-Orge is served by Saint-Michel-sur-Orge station on Paris RER line C. The 401 bus line connects Saint-Michel-sur-Orge to Évry, the capital of the department.

== Population ==
Historical population
Year	Pop.	±% p.a.
1968	15,268	—
1975	20,727	+4.46%
1982	20,044	−0.48%
1990	20,771	+0.45%
1999	20,375	−0.21%
2007	20,148	−0.14%
2012	20,188	+0.04%
2017	19,758	−0.43%
2023	21,776	+1.63%
Source: INSEE

== Education ==
There are eight primary schools in the commune.

Secondary schools:

- Collège Jean Moulin and Collège Nicolas Boileau (junior high schools)
- Lycée Léonard de Vinci (senior high)

== See also ==
- Communes of the Essonne department
