= Leudeville =

Commune in Île-de-France, France

- Commune
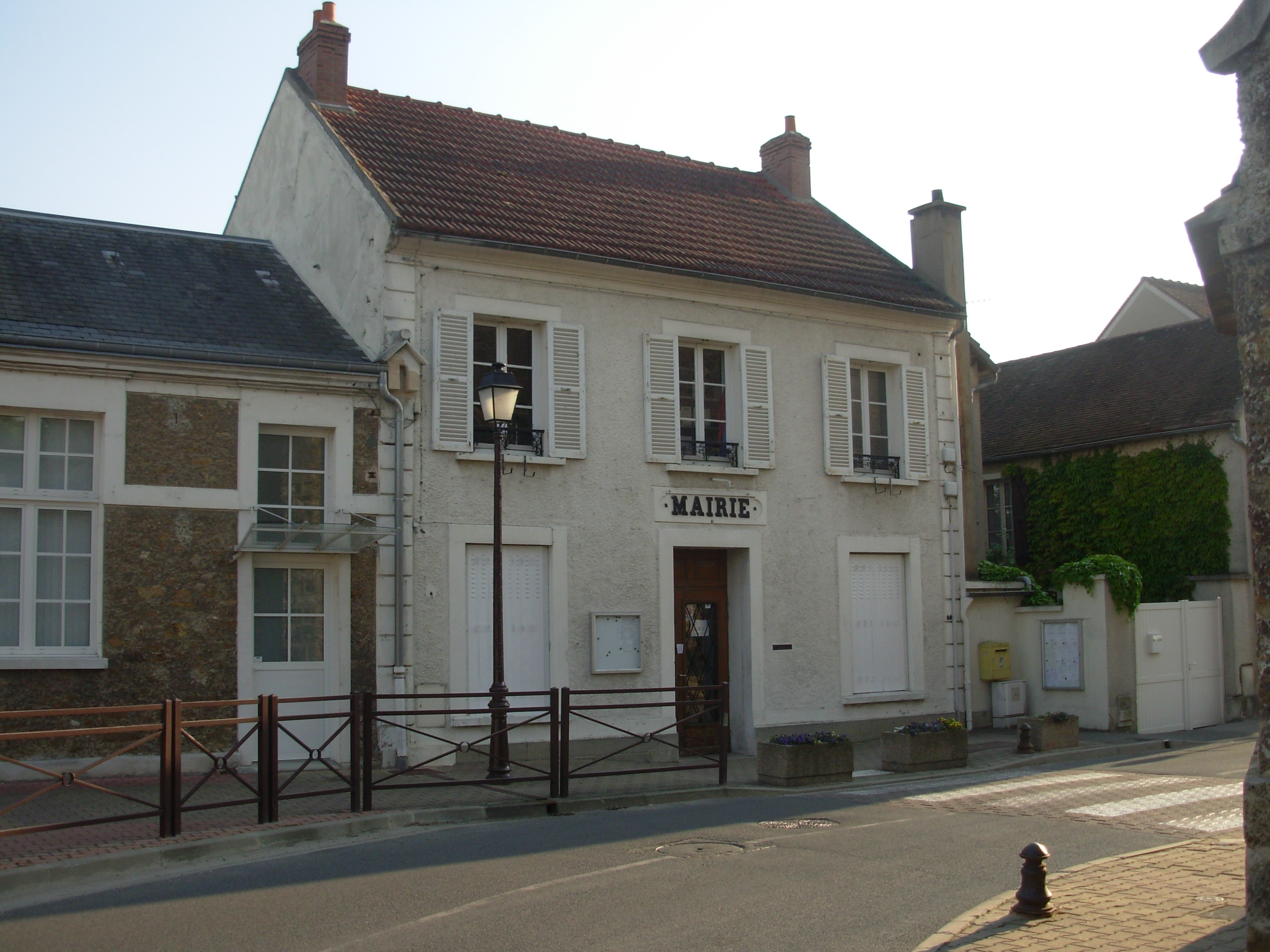
- The town hall in Leudeville

- Coat of arms
- Location of Leudeville
- Location within France Location within Île-de-France (region)
- Coordinates: 48°33′55″N 2°19′34″E
- Country: France
- Region: Île-de-France
- Department: Essonne
- Arrondissement: Palaiseau
- Canton: Brétigny-sur-Orge
- Intercommunality: Val d'Essonne

Government
  - Mayor (2020–2026): Jean-Pierre Lecomte
- Area^{1}: 7.84 km^{2} (3.03 sq mi)
- Highest elevation: 87 m (285 ft)
- Lowest elevation: 74 m (243 ft)
- Population (2023): 1,562
  - Density: 199/km^{2} (516/sq mi)
- Time zone: UTC+01:00 (CET)
  - Summer (DST): UTC+02:00 (CEST)
- INSEE/Postal code: 91332 /91630
- ^{1} French Land Register data, which excludes lakes, ponds, glaciers > 1 km^{2} (0.386 sq mi or 247 acres) and river estuaries.

Leudeville (French pronunciation: [lødvil]) is a commune in the Essonne department in Île-de-France in northern France.

Inhabitants of Leudeville are known as Leudevillois.

== See also ==
- Communes of the Essonne department
