= Deutz AG =

German motor manufacturer

DEUTZ AG
- Type: Aktiengesellschaft
- Traded as: FWB: DEZ; SDAX
- Industry: Mechanical engineering
- Founded: March 31, 1864; 162 years ago
- Founder: Nicolaus Otto; Eugen Langen
- Headquarters: Cologne, Germany
- Area served: Worldwide
- Key people: Sebastian Schulte (CEO, CFO); Dietmar Voggenreiter (Chairman of the supervisory board)
- Products: Diesel engines and engine components for agricultural machinery, marine propulsion, automobiles and construction equipment
- Revenue: €2,104.8 million (2023)
- Net income: €81.9 million (2023)
- Total assets: €1.213 billion (2017)
- Total equity: €743.2 million (2023)
- Number of employees: 5,284 (2023)
- Website: www.deutz.com

Deutz AG is a German internal combustion engine manufacturer, based in Porz, Cologne, Germany.

== History ==
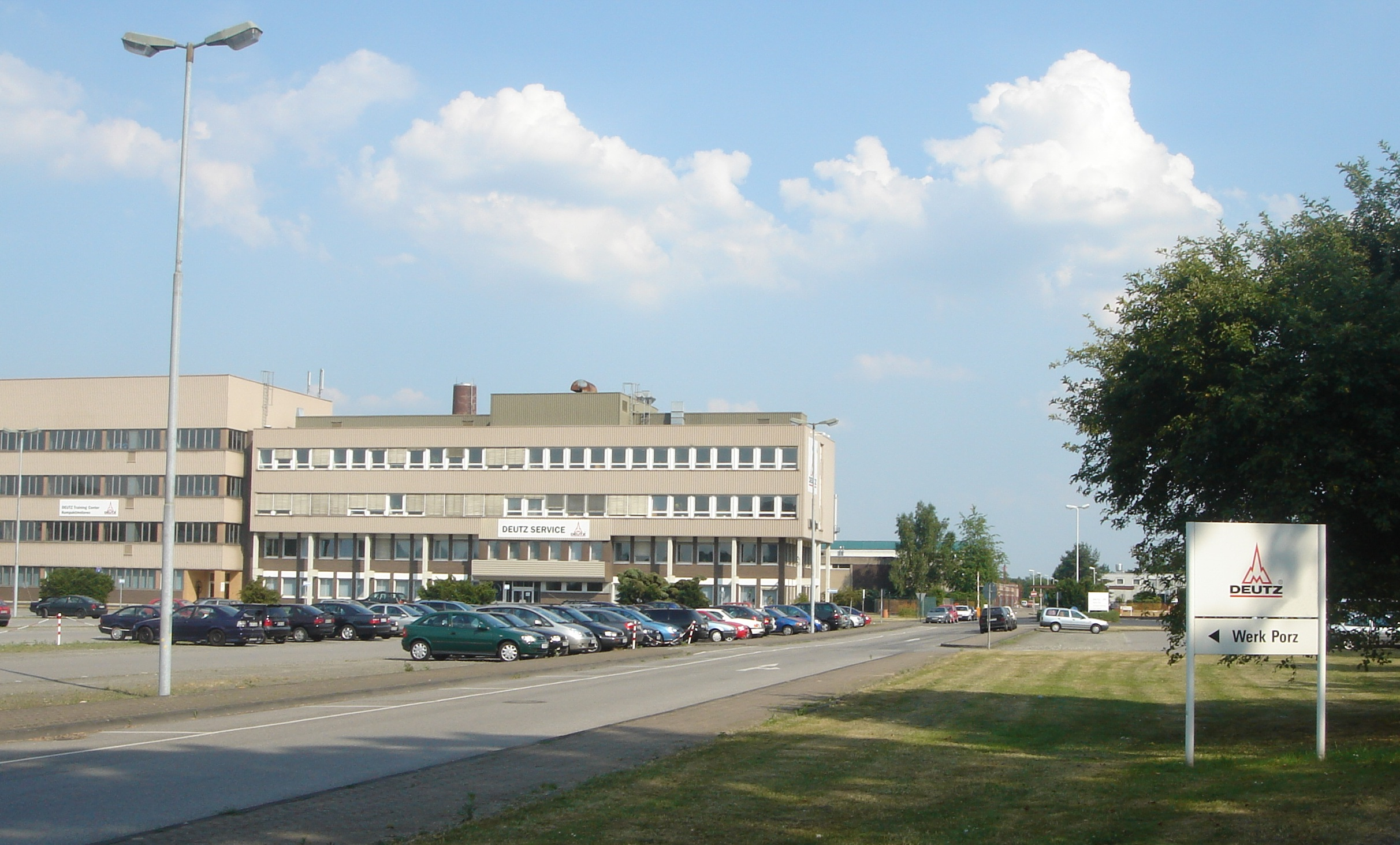
Deutz AG production plant in Porz

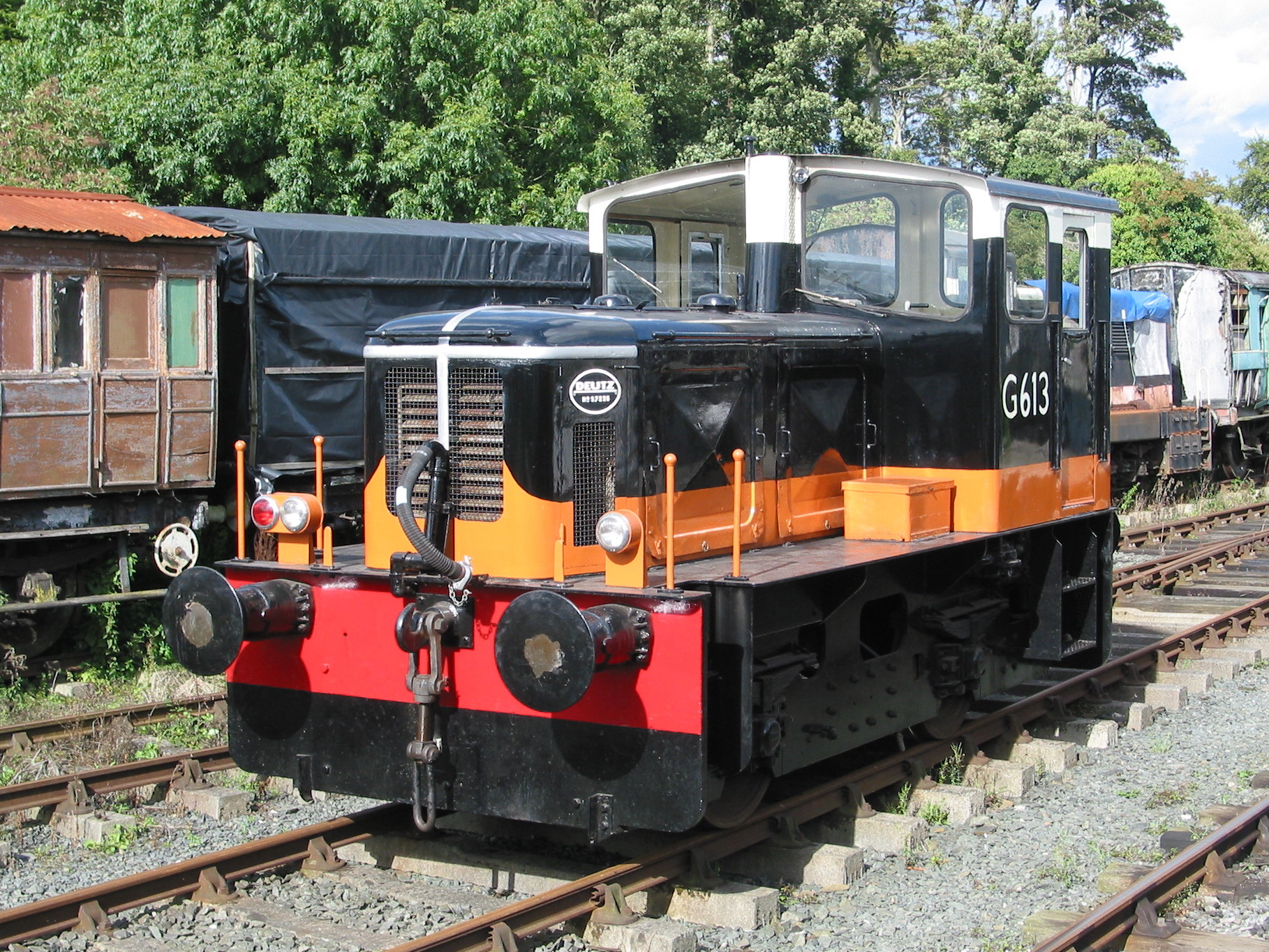
G613 (Downpatrick & Co Down Railway)

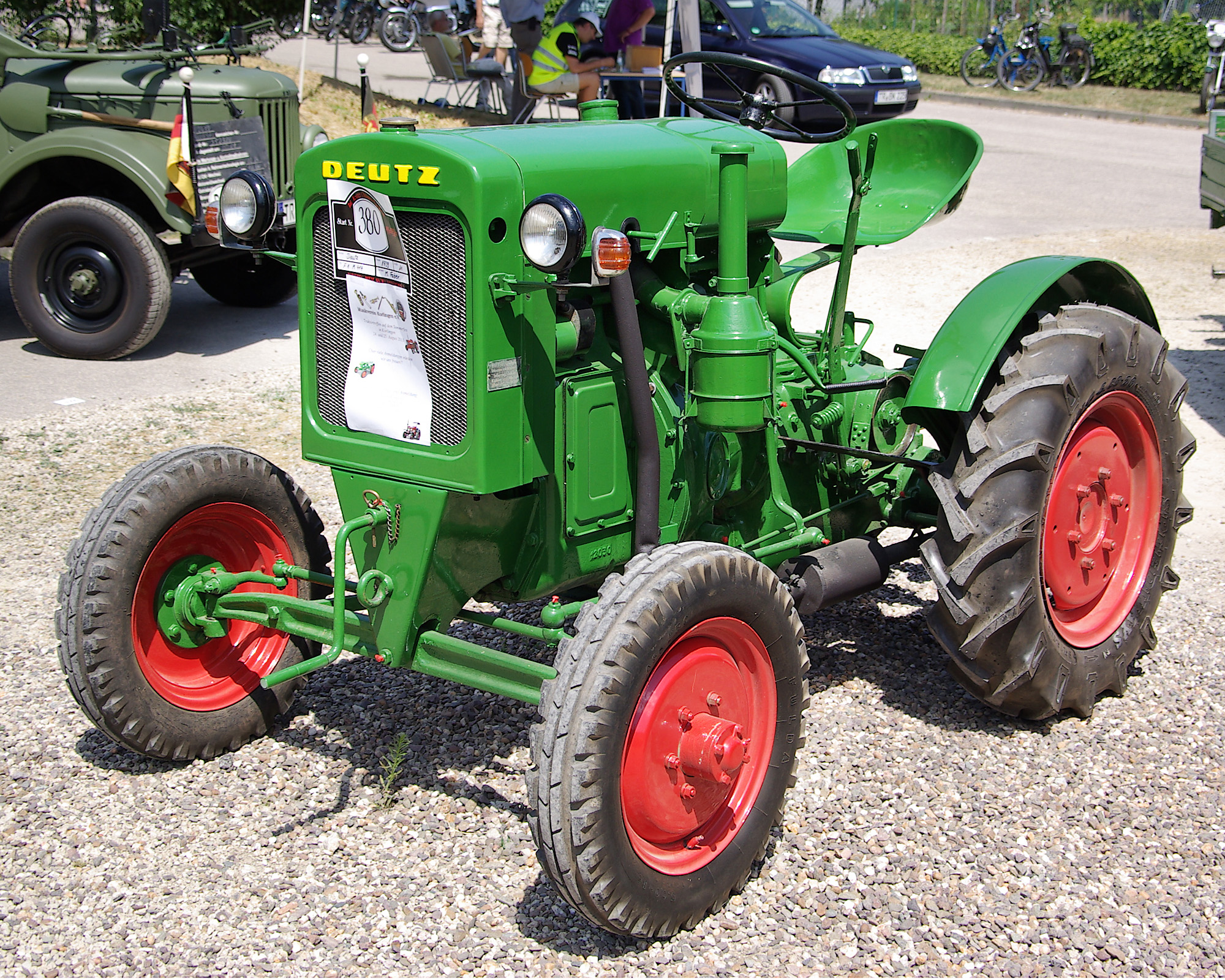
Deutz F1 M414 tractor (1939)

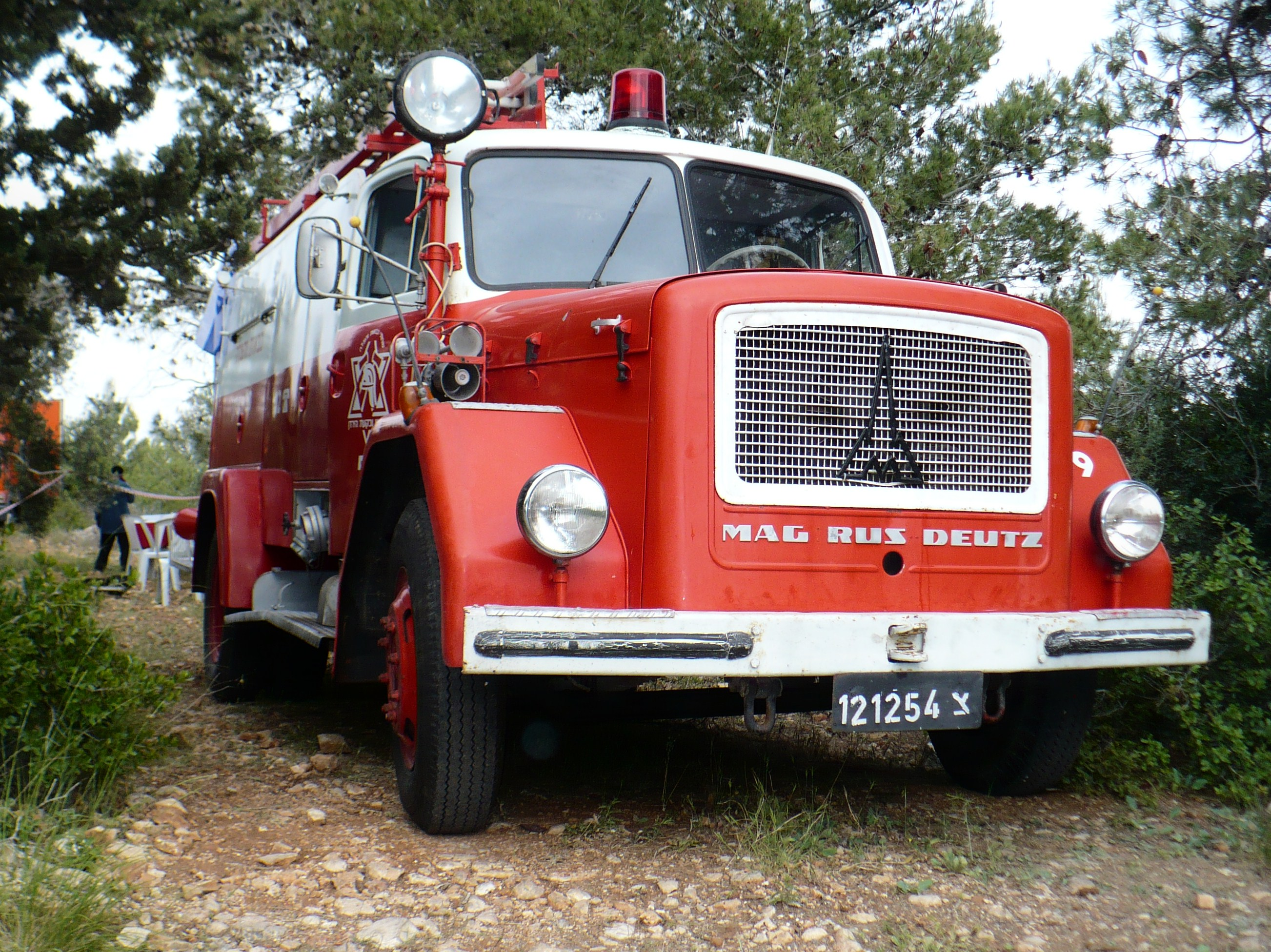
Magirus Israeli fire engine

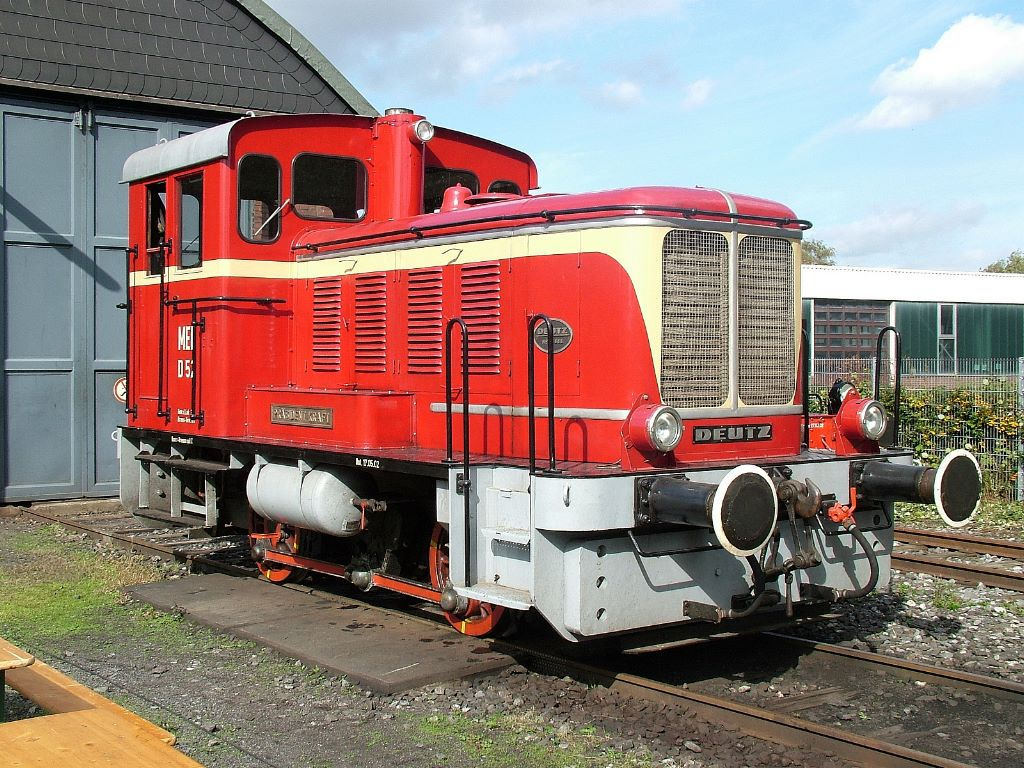
Diesel locomotive type KHD T4M 625, 1954

The company was founded by Nicolaus Otto, the inventor of the four-stroke internal combustion engine, and his partner Eugen Langen on 31 March 1864, as N. A. Otto & Cie, later renamed to Gasmotoren-Fabrik Deutz after moving operations in 1869, from Cologne to Deutz, located on the opposite side of the Rhine.

In the early years, Otto and Langen were interested only in producing stationary engines, not automobiles. The technical director, Gottlieb Daimler, was eager to produce automobiles. In the middle of the 1870s, it was suggested that he transfer to the company's St. Petersburg factory to reduce his influence. He then resigned, taking Wilhelm Maybach with him. Deutz also produced agricultural machines such as combine harvesters and tractors, as well as commercial vehicles such as trucks and buses.

In 1884, Edouard Sarazin, a Belgian patent lawyer and pioneer of automotive engineering, represented 'Gasmotorenfabrik Otto & Langen' (Deutz AG) and acquired the license to build Deutz engines in France, which he duly contracted to Perin, Panhard & Cie (later Panhard et Levassor) in Paris. Around 1886/1887, he similarly acquired licenses to build Daimler engines. His untimely death in 1887 left his widow Louise to develop the business relationships and complete the partnership negotiations.

Famous people who have worked for Deutz include Eugen Langen, Nicolaus Otto, Gottlieb Daimler (from 1872 until 1880), Wilhelm Maybach (from 1872 until 1880), Prosper L'Orange (from 1904 until October 1908), Ettore Bugatti (in 1907), and Robert Bosch.

During World War II, the company was ordered to produce artillery and operated under the name Klöckner Humboldt Deutz AG (KHD). In 1942, KHD was declared a war model company by the National Socialist German Workers' Front for its "services to the defense economy". In this context, the company relied heavily on the use of forced laborers. In the 1942/1943 financial year, 2127 people, mainly from western Europe, were forced to work at KHD. In some cases, up to 40 percent of the workers in the plants were forced laborers. The factory was almost destroyed by an air raid on the night of 3 and 4 July 1943 (→ Bombing of Cologne in WW II).

From 1892 to 1970, Deutz built locomotives in the power range from 3 to 1,491 kW (4 to 2,000 hp); until 1927, with gasoline engines, and from 1927, increasingly with diesel engine drive.

Commercial vehicles powered by Deutz engines were popular from 1960 to 1980. Fire engines built by Magirus in Ulm, Southern Germany, used an M-shaped logo, with the steeple of the world's tallest church, the Ulm Minster, in its center. After the Magirus-Deutz merger, the company continued to use this logo even though the twin towers of the Cologne Cathedral can be seen from the company headquarters.

Deutz's head office is in the Porz district of Cologne and, as of 2004, was manufacturing liquid and air-cooled diesel engines. The larger engines in the Deutz range were manufactured in Mannheim at a production facility that once belonged to Süddeutsche Bremsen-AG as MWM-Diesel. Deutz also has production facilities in other countries, including Spain, and a joint venture production facility in China. After Deutz took over, the plant specialized in marine engines. This facility now produces engines for marine and power generation, which can run on either fuel oils or fuel gases (including landfill gas). In 1995 Deutz sold its agricultural machinery division – Deutz-Fahr – to the Italian company SAME, forming SAME Deutz-Fahr.

In February 2022, CEO Frank Hiller was dismissed and replaced by the supervisory board. Sebastian Schulte replaced him as the interim CEO & CFO. The Chairman of the Supervisory Board, Bernd Bohr, resigned. His successor was Dietmar Voggenreiter.

== Tractors ==
- Deutz F1L 514 (1950-1951)
- Deutz F1L 712 (1958-1959)

== Engines ==
Deutz engines are available in the power range of 5 to 500 kW, with air, oil or water cooling and with life expectancy of 20,000 to 30,000 running hours TBO (Time Between Overhauling) on rebuilt and brand-new units.

Parts and services are available worldwide. A network of distributors in the United States and Canada was established.

Deutz-powered air-cooled engines are well-suited for many applications since they cannot freeze or boil over during normal operation.

Deutz also manufactures oil-cooled engines. These can provide the same power as other engine designs, but in a smaller package, since they do not require the additional space to house a radiator. Deutz also makes engines with a tandem oil cooler/radiator configuration; these also do not require antifreeze or coolant agents.

Deutz also sells a line of economic liquid-cooled engines.

In 2007, the Deutz Power Systems division was sold to 3i, and Deutz AG now concentrates on producing and selling compact engines under the Deutz brand only. They focus on manufacturing engines only for the customer, without competing for the entire piece of finished machinery.

On October 1, 2008, the former Deutz Power Systems division received a new former name MWM (Motoren Werke Mannheim AG). Karl Benz established the company in 1871. After splitting the engine business from Benz AG, it became Motoren-Werke Mannheim AG. Klöckner-Humboldt-Deutz AG took over in 1985, later becoming Deutz AG. After spinning off Deutz Power Systems, the company has made a full circle back to MWM.

In 2012, SAME Deutz-Fahr sold 22 million shares, the majority of its holding in Deutz AG, to Volvo, making it the largest shareholder at just over 25%. SAME Deutz-Fahr retained 8.4% equity in the company.

In 2017, Deutz acquired Torqeedo GmbH, a specialist in integrated electric and hybrid drives for boats. Volvo sold all of its ownership stakes in Deutz the same year.

In August 2024, Deutz acquired the sales and service activities of Rolls-Royce Power Systems' off-highway engine division.

== Former business ==
=== Locomotive and wagon construction (1892-1970) ===
Until the 1950s, only small locomotives (e.g. light rail locomotives) were produced. After the interest group formed in 1953 with the United Westdeutsche Waggonfabriken AG (Westwaggon) and their final takeover in 1959, KHD was also able to build large bogie diesel locomotives.

- Class V60 of the Deutsche Bundesbahn from 1957
- Class V100 of the Deutsche Bundesbahn from 1961
- Class V160 of the Deutsche Bundesbahn from 1966
- Class V90 of the Deutsche Bundesbahn from 1967

Other types of construction for industrial and private railways were also produced between 1959 and 1970, including:

- Type KHD PMZ122R from 1929
- Types KHD A4M 220 R / 420 R from 1934
- Type KHD A6M 324 R from 1934
- Type KHD A8M 324 R type C from 1938
- Type KHD A2L 514 R from 1952
- Type KHD A8L 614 R from 1953
- Type KHD T8M 625 R 1956
- Type KHD DG 2000 BBM 1956
- Type KHD DG 2000 CCE 1957
- Type KHD KS 55 B from 1958
- Type KHD MS 800 D 1959
- Type KHD DG 1000 BBM from 1959
- Type KHD DG 1200 BBM from 1960
- Type KHD DG 1600 CCM from 1959
- Type KHD DG 2000 CCM from 1963
- Type KHD DG 1500 CCM 1970
