= Marolles-en-Hurepoix =

Commune in Île-de-France, France

- Commune
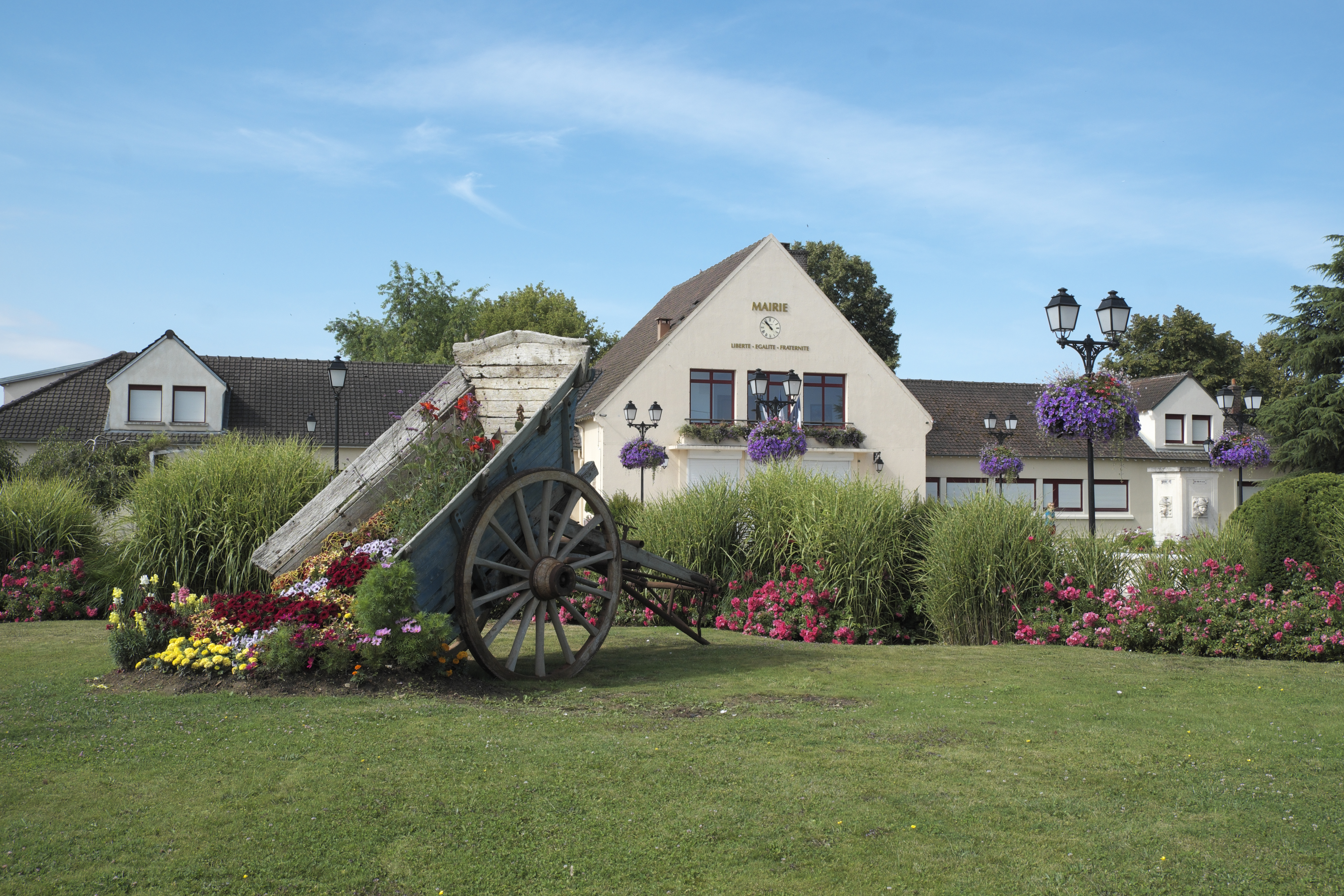
- The town hall in Marolles-en-Hurepoix

- Coat of arms
- Location of Marolles-en-Hurepoix
- Location within France Location within Île-de-France (region)
- Coordinates: 48°33′49″N 2°17′36″E
- Country: France
- Region: Île-de-France
- Department: Essonne
- Arrondissement: Palaiseau
- Canton: Brétigny-sur-Orge
- Intercommunality: CA Cœur d'Essonne

Government
  - Mayor (2020–2026): Georges Joubert
- Area^{1}: 6.47 km^{2} (2.50 sq mi)
- Highest elevation: 89 m (292 ft)
- Lowest elevation: 77 m (253 ft)
- Population (2023): 5,708
  - Density: 882/km^{2} (2,280/sq mi)
- Demonym: Marollais
- Time zone: UTC+01:00 (CET)
  - Summer (DST): UTC+02:00 (CEST)
- INSEE/Postal code: 91376 /91630
- ^{1} French Land Register data, which excludes lakes, ponds, glaciers > 1 km^{2} (0.386 sq mi or 247 acres) and river estuaries.

Marolles-en-Hurepoix (French pronunciation: [maʁɔl ɑ̃ yʁpwa]; lit. 'Marolles-in-Hurepoix') is a commune in the Essonne department in Île-de-France in northern France.

== Population ==
Inhabitants of Marolles-en-Hurepoix are known as Marollais in French.

Historical population
Year	Pop.	±% p.a.
1968	1,578	—
1975	2,711	+8.04%
1982	3,549	+3.92%
1990	4,126	+1.90%
1999	4,669	+1.38%
2007	4,740	+0.19%
2012	4,928	+0.78%
2017	5,388	+1.80%
2023	5,708	+0.97%
Source: INSEE

== See also ==
- Communes of the Essonne department
