= René Panhard =

French engineer and car industrialist (1841–1908)

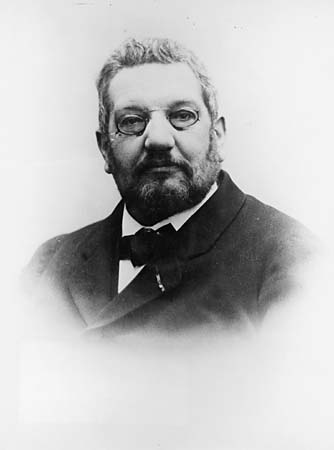
- Born: Louis François René Panhard; 27 May 1841; Paris, France
- Died: 16 July 1908 (aged 67); La Bourboule, France
- Education: École Centrale Paris
- Occupation(s): design and production of automobiles

Louis François René Panhard (27 May 1841 – 16 July 1908) was a French engineer, merchant and a pioneer of the automobile industry in France.

Born in Paris, he studied engineering at the Collège Sainte-Barbe and then graduated from École Centrale Paris in 1864. He was then employed by Jean-Louis Périn in a firm that produced wood-working machines. It was there that Panhard met Émile Levassor. In 1878, he was named Chevalier of the Legion of Honour.

In 1889 after the death of Jean-Louis Perin, Panhard partnered with Levassor and Edouard Sarazin (and his widow Louise) to enlarge Avenue d'Ivry in the 13th arrondissement of Paris, develop the French engine manufacturing licenses for Gottlieb Daimler internal combustion engine and found the Panhard & Levassor car company. The company produced its first automobile in 1890.

In 1891, Panhard and Levassor designed and produced the first Daimler car engine, the twin V. Panhard also participated in and won many automobile races including the Paris-Rouen, 1894, the first major motor race in the world, Paris-Bordeaux-Paris in 1895 and the Tour de France Automobile of 1899. Panhard cars dominated racing everywhere until 1900.

In 1897, Levassor died as the result of a racing accident. Panhard then joined with his son, Hippolytus, to continue with developing and producing automobiles including, by 1900, a wide range of luxury cars.

In 1904, Panhard won a grand prize at the St. Louis Exposition.

Panhard was also a mayor of Thiais in the département Val-de-Marne. In Paris, a street in the 13th arrondissement is named after him.

René Panhard died in 1908 in La Bourboule and was buried in the Père Lachaise Cemetery in Paris.
