= Louis Delagarde =

French automotive designer (1898–1990)

- Born: September 5, 1898; Vitry-le-François
- Died: April 25, 1990 (aged 91); Bourg-la-Reine
- Occupation: Automotive engineer

Albert Marie Louis Delagarde (1898–1990) was an engineer and automotive designer known primarily for his work with French carmaker Panhard & Levassor.

== Biography ==
Delagarde was born on September 5, 1898, in Vitry-le-François. His father, who was a judge, died in 1906, after which his mother moved to the Rue d'Assas in Paris. Delagarde's early education included time at Bossuet, Conflans-Sainte-Honorine, and Collège Stanislas de Paris.

It was during this time that he developed an enthusiasm for motorcycles that lasted throughout his life.

Delagarde enlisted in the French army in April 1917, and was sent to the front in June 1918 in an artillery corps of Renault FT tanks, where he commanded a section. During quiet times he studied for entry to the École Centrale Paris, often while astride the barrel of his tank's gun. Delagarde was wounded three times during his service, and was awarded the Croix de Guerre and the Légion d'Honneur.

Delagarde joined Panhard in late 1921, right after graduating from the École Centrale. His salary was 600 F per month.

In 1924 Delagarde married Lucie Blard. The couple went on to have ten children.

In 1949 he was promoted to the position of Officier de la Légion d'honneur for his work on gasifiers.

Delagarde died in Bourg-la-Reine, in the arrondissement of Antony, on 25 April 1990.

== Panhard ==
=== Military ===
One of Delagarde's first projects for Panhard was improving gas generators or "gasifiers" for the military. His chief contributions were the adoption of a nozzle developed by partner Jean Gohin and the addition of a filter of his own design.

Delagarde also did design work on various Panhard military vehicles, beginning with the 1928 AMD (Auto-Mitrailleuse de Découverte - Machine-gun reconnaissance) 165. The 165 led to the 172, 175 and 178. One of the features Delagarde introduced was to arrange the chassis so as to improve protection against direct fire.

In 1938 Delagarde and Géry produced a new armoured car prototype called the AM 201. This eight-wheeled vehicle used four rubber-tired wheels in the outer-most corners with four retractable steel "agricultural" wheels, two on each side, in the middle.

In 1945 he made significant contributions to development of the Panhard EBR ("Engin Blindé de Reconnaissance" or Armored Reconnaissance Vehicle). He designed an armoured shell chassis for the car, and angled the exterior plating to deflect incoming fire. Delagarde also produced the engine for the EBR; an air-cooled 6.0 L flat-twelve engine that produced 250 hp (186.4 kW) on gasoline and made the EBR one of the fastest reconnaissance vehicles of the time. The low, centrally mounted engine allowed enough space in the body to accommodate a driver both in front and in back, enabling the vehicle to drive forwards or backwards indifferently, as well as two turret operators. The Panhard & Levassor EBR armored reconnaissance vehicle was chosen by the army in 1949." An EBR was used to transfer the body of General de Gaulle from Paris to Colombey-les-Deux-Eglises.

=== Dyna Panhard ===
In 1939 Panhard's design office was moved to Tarbes, and Delagarde relocated along with it. It was here that Delagarde first drew a 350 cc (21.4 cu in) air-cooled flat-twin engine for a new small front-wheel drive car conceived by Jean Panhard and designed by Louis Bionier. Sketches from 1941 called the car the VP, for "Voiture Populaire", or People's Car. As work progressed the car changed from the two-door VP to the four-door VP2.

Delagarde's engine had several distinctive features. Its air-cooled boxer layout reflected Delagarde's long-standing interest in motorcycling. To eliminate problems with cylinder head joints, the cylinder heads were not detachable, but were cast in unit with the cylinder barrels as "blind" cylinders. The crankshaft was a built-up unit that rode in roller bearing big ends and ball bearing mains. The roller bearings were an original design by Delagarde that introduced reduced-diameter "inverter rollers" between the main rollers to extend the life of the bearing. Rights to this design were later acquired by SKF. The connecting rods were one-piece units. Rather than use helical-wound coil springs to close the engine's valves, or even the Knight-style sleeve valves seen on the pre-war Panhards, Delagarde opted to use long torsion bars to close the flat-twin's intake and exhaust valves. The ends of the torsion bars opposite the valves in each cylinder were connected together, increasing the force exerted on the valve being operated.

Delagarde also designed the transmission and final drive, producing a four-speed transaxle unit with a direct drive third gear and an overdrive fourth gear.

When Panhard discovered that it had been excluded from the Pons Plan and would not have access to the steel needed to resume post-war production, they licensed a car designed by J.A. Grégoire that was similar in many ways to the VP2. Grégoire's design, originally called the "Automobile Légère Grégoire" (ALG), made extensive use of light alloys. When the French aluminium company Aluminium Français (AF) took an interest in sponsoring the project, the car was renamed "Aluminium Français Grégoire" (AFG). With AF's backing Panhard was given permission to resume building passenger cars, but substituted their own chassis and suspension for that of the original AFG, and Delagarde's flat-twin, enlarged to 610 cc (37.2 cu in), for the 594 cc (36.2 cu in) air-cooled flat-twin in the AFG. Design of Delagarde's engine was started before that of Grégoire's. It also produced more power. The revised car went into production as the Dyna Panhard.

=== Other work ===
Some of Delagarde's early work at Panhard included designing trucks and diesel engines. Working with Bionier and technical director Pasquelin, he did the mechanical design for the Panhard Dynamic of 1936.

In 1950 Delagarde was awarded a patent for a system to close engine valves using a single bar.

Delagarde retired from Panhard in 1975, after a career spanning almost 55 years with the same company.

== Honours ==
- Croix de Guerre 1914–1918
- Officier de la Légion d'honneur
