= Louis Bionier =

French engineer

- Born: 1898; Alfortville, France
- Died: 1973 (aged 74–75)
- Occupations: Automotive designer and stylist

Louis Bionier (1898–1973) was a French automotive engineer. He is best known as head of chassis development and chief stylist for carbuilder Panhard. He was also involved in the design of some of Panhard's military vehicles.

== Biography ==
Bionier was born in the commune of Alfortville, France in 1898. His father, a bicycle builder, died when Bionier was nine years old. Two years after this, having obtained his Certificat d'études primaires, he left school and went to work to help support his mother.

He is said to have apprenticed with Appareils d’Aviation Les Frères Voisin, an aircraft company established in 1906 by brothers Gabriel and Charles Voisin.

In 1921 Bionier joined the staff of car builder Panhard et Levassor as a stylist. In 1929 he became their chief stylist, a position he occupied until 1967, earning the sobriquet Dieu le père (god the father).

In 1925 Bionier married Marie-Louise Audebert, who owned a photography studio. Bionier himself subsequently became interested in photography and amateur film making. He was also a keen observer of nature and in 1927 began to use his camera to record what he saw during trips to Switzerland, Italy, and the French Riviera.

Bionier retired from Panhard in 1967. He died in 1973.

== Panhard ==
Bionier was first hired by Panhard et Levassor in 1915, but as an apprentice tool fitter. He soon came to the attention of management, and members of the Panhard family began to mentor him. Bionier worked in the factory during the day, gaining experience in different departments, and attended Panhard's École Pratique internal training school at night.

In 1924 Panhard et Levassor took over the factory of car maker Delaugère et Clayette in Orléans. This acquisition allowed Panhard to produce bodies for their own standard models in house, rather than rely on outside carrosserie to complete the cars. Special models were still bodied outside of the company.

In 1929 Bionier was made the head of Panhard's Bureau d'Études et de Recherches Carrosserie (Office of Bodywork Studies and Research), or BERC, putting him in charge of all body and chassis development for the company.

=== DS, CS, and Panoramique ===
October 1929 marked the debut of the 6DS at the Salon de l'Automobile in Paris. This design by Bionier signaled a modernisation of Panhard's line. The "S" in the name stood for "Surbaissée", or "Lowered". The car's roofline was lowered, as was the chassis, with appropriate changes to the suspension. The 6DS' chassis was also narrowed, and featured a double-skinned floor that increased overall stiffness. One year later the 6CS and 8DS appeared. Two years after that both cars received minor updates.

In 1934 came another revision to the bodywork. For this model, called the Panoramique, Bionier introduced a feature that took advantage of the driver's binocular vision to improve outward visibility. Leaving the main windscreen glass as a single flat plate, Bionier replaced the single A-pillar on each side with dual pillars and filled the gap between them with curved glass panels made by Saint Gobain. A driver looking askance past the pillars would not perceive the pillars at all, having an apparently unobstructed 180° view ahead.

=== Dynamic ===
In May 1936 Panhard introduced the Panhard Dynamic. For this car Bionier produced a curvaceous side-skirted Streamline Moderne shape that expressed his early interest in aerodynamics, and retained the split A-pillars of the Panoramique. The headlamps were incorporated into the fenders rather than being mounted separately, and were capped by covers that echoed the shape of the main grille. The driver's position in the Dynamic's six seat body was originally in the centre of the three-place front bench, but this was later moved to the more typical left hand side. In the place of the earlier models' ladder frame was a new monocoque chassis. The suspension used torsion bar springs front and back, and the car came with a dual-circuit hydraulic braking system that operated on all four wheels.

=== Dyna X ===
Before World War II had ended Jean Panhard foresaw that post-war demand for Panhard's typically large and expensive cars would be limited, and that a smaller less expensive model would be needed. Designer Louis Bionier began development of a small two-door front-wheel drive "voiture populaire" (people's car) that would be powered by a new air-cooled two-cylinder boxer engine designed by engineer Louis Delagarde.

Automotive innovator Jean-Albert Grégoire was working on a similar project originally called the "Automobile Légère Grégoire" (ALG), later renamed "Aluminium Français Grégoire" (AFG) when the French national aluminum consortium stepped in to sponsor the project. Grégoire's design was also for a small, 2-door, front-wheel drive car powered by an air-cooled two-cylinder boxer engine. The AFG weighed only 400 kg (881.8 lb) due to the use of Alpax to produce a unitary-style chassis and the use of aluminum for the bodywork. Grégoire showed the car to several French car makers, with Simca showing the most interest, but none committed to putting the AFG into production.

When the Pons Plan to rationalize the French automotive industry went into effect, Panhard found itself excluded from the list of approved automakers and denied permission to resume building cars and access to the needed materials. In the early post-war period steel was rationed but aluminum, whose production had been increased during the war, was not. To obtain permission to build small cars under the Pons Plan, Panhard obtained non-exclusive rights to the aluminum-intensive AFG strongly supported by Pons.

Bionier and Delagarde developed a car called the VP2 that substituted a chassis of two tall narrow steel box members and cross-bracing for the AFG's Alpax unitary unit at Bionier's insistence. The rear suspension was a triple-torsion bar system. Power came from Delagarde's air-cooled twin, and went to the front wheels through a transaxle also created by Delagarde. The VP2 was a 4-door 4-seat car. Its bodywork, still of aluminum, was similar in style to that of the AFG, although neither Grégoire nor Bionier were entirely satisfied with the result. Panhard may have been pressured to make the VP2 look like the AFG but they never acknowledged any connection between the two cars. The VP2 went into production as the Panhard Dyna X. Grégoire later sued Panhard for unpaid royalties.

=== Dynavia ===
Bionier remained fascinated by the shapes and movements of birds and fish. Like some of his contemporaries he had come to appreciate some aerodynamic principles, such as the importance of reducing frontal area and of maintaining smooth, turbulence-free air flow along the length of a car's body.

In 1945 he made wooden 1:5 scale models of an experimental car he called the VP6 and had them tested in the wind tunnel of the Institute Aérodynamique in Saint-Cyr. Later, to assess the air flow over full size bodies, he conceived of and manufactured sets of small, light, but precisely shaped vanes. These vanes included a ball joint that allowed them to pivot in the air flow, and were attached to the body of the car under test by means of a suction cup. These vanes allowed Bionier to film the effects of air flow over a body.

The result of these experiments was the Dynavia. Parts sufficient for three cars were made, but only two were assembled. Of these, one was sold to a private buyer and was later so badly damaged in a road accident that it was scrapped. Built using the chassis, engine, and suspension of a Dyna X, this highly streamlined car was well received when it was shown at the 1948 Paris Salon de l'Automobile, and convinced Panhard to allow Bionier to design an aerodynamic body for the successor to the Dyna X.

=== Dyna Z and PL 17 ===
The replacement for the Dyna X took under 30 months to ready for production. Bionier, working with André Jouan, produced a very smooth ponton body style that would be executed in aluminium panels produced by Aluminium Français. This six-seat berline was still powered by Delagarde's flat twin, recently enlarged to 848 cc. Rather than wait for the Paris Motor Show in October Panhard opted to unveil the car on 17 June 1953 at the Les Ambassadeurs restaurant in the Hôtel Crillon on the Place de la Concorde, Paris. In 1957 some of the car's structure was switched to steel from Duralinox, and later some of the aluminum body panels were also switched to steel. Production ran until 1959.

On 29 June 1959 the Dyna Z was replaced by the PL 17, which was a restyling of the previous model rather than a completely new car. Bionier revised the front and rear of the car, leaving the chassis and central cabin from the Dyna Z unaltered. While the front doors on early PL 17s were hinged on the trailing edge, in July 1960 this was changed, and the doors' hinges were moved to the leading edge. The PL 17 buyer also had the choice of two engine options; a 40 hp (29.8 kW) cooking engine, or the 50 hp (37.3 kW) Tigre version. Both engines displaced the same 848 cc. Apart from some mechanical upgrades, the PL 17 received one minor styling upgrade in the early 1960s that raised and extended the trailing edge of the roofline, added modern headlamps, and relocated the spare wheel to under the bonnet, enlarging the available space in the boot. Production of the PL 17 continued until 1965.

=== PL 24 ===
Bionier's final design for Panhard was the PL 24. The chassis was a new steel perimeter frame with a welded floor and attachment points for the front subframe and rear suspension. Power once again came from Panhard's air-cooled flat twin, displacing 848 cc.

Bionier and René Ducassou-Péhau drew a new 2+2 coupé body. The large and airy greenhouse, prominent raised bodyline highlighted by Inox trim circling the car at shoulder height, and scalloped panels below drew comparisons to the 1960 Chevrolet Corvair. The car's flat "flying" roof was carried on high-tensile strength steel pillars that extended down into the chassis for support. The sloping nose carried inset headlamps, prescient of Robert Opron's later redesign of the DS's nose.

The car was first presented to the public on 24 June 1963 at the Montlhéry race circuit. Sales started the next year. Models included the original 24C (Coupé) and 24B (Berline) with a wheelbase stretched by 25 cm (9.8 in). The base 24C, 24B and the reduced-content 24BA came with a 42 hp (31.3 kW) engine, while the 24CT and 24BT received the 50 hp (37.3 kW) Tigre engine. Production of the PL 24 only lasted until 1967.

=== Citroën Dyane ===
When Renault's new 4L began to eat into sales of the 2CV, Pierre Bercot decided that the challenge could be answered by a car with an updated appearance that used the 2CV's mechanical components, replicated the features of the 4L, and could be slotted into Citroën's lineup above the 2CV but below the upcoming Ami 6. He assigned the project to Bionier.

Working with Ducassou-Péhau, a series of sketches were produced for the car. These were considered too radical, and Bercot asked for revisions that were done by Jacques Charreton. The revised Bonier/Ducassou-Péhau/Charreton design was accepted and went into production as the Citroën Dyane.

Bionier retired in 1967, the same year that the Dyane, the last design he oversaw, went on sale.

== Gallery ==
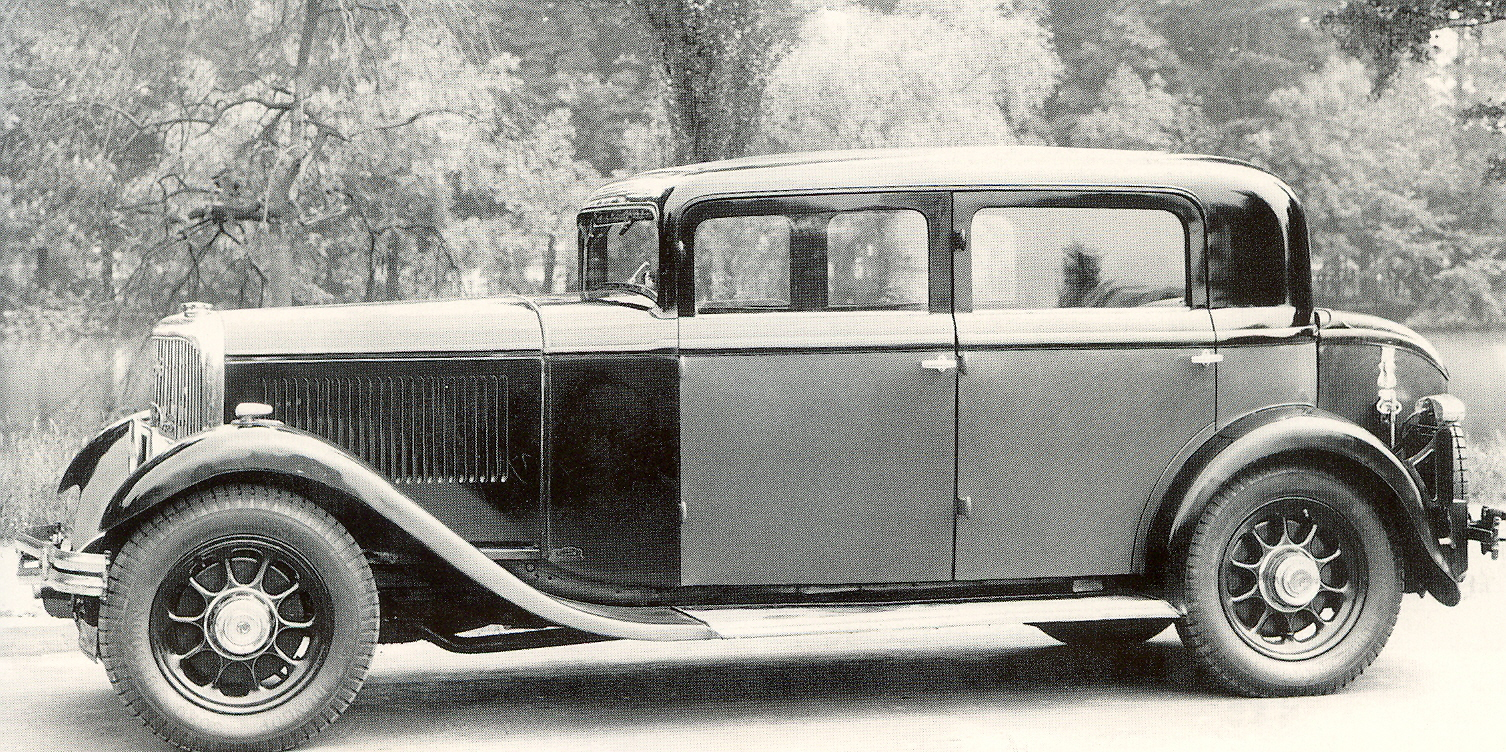
1931 Panhard et Levassor 6CS

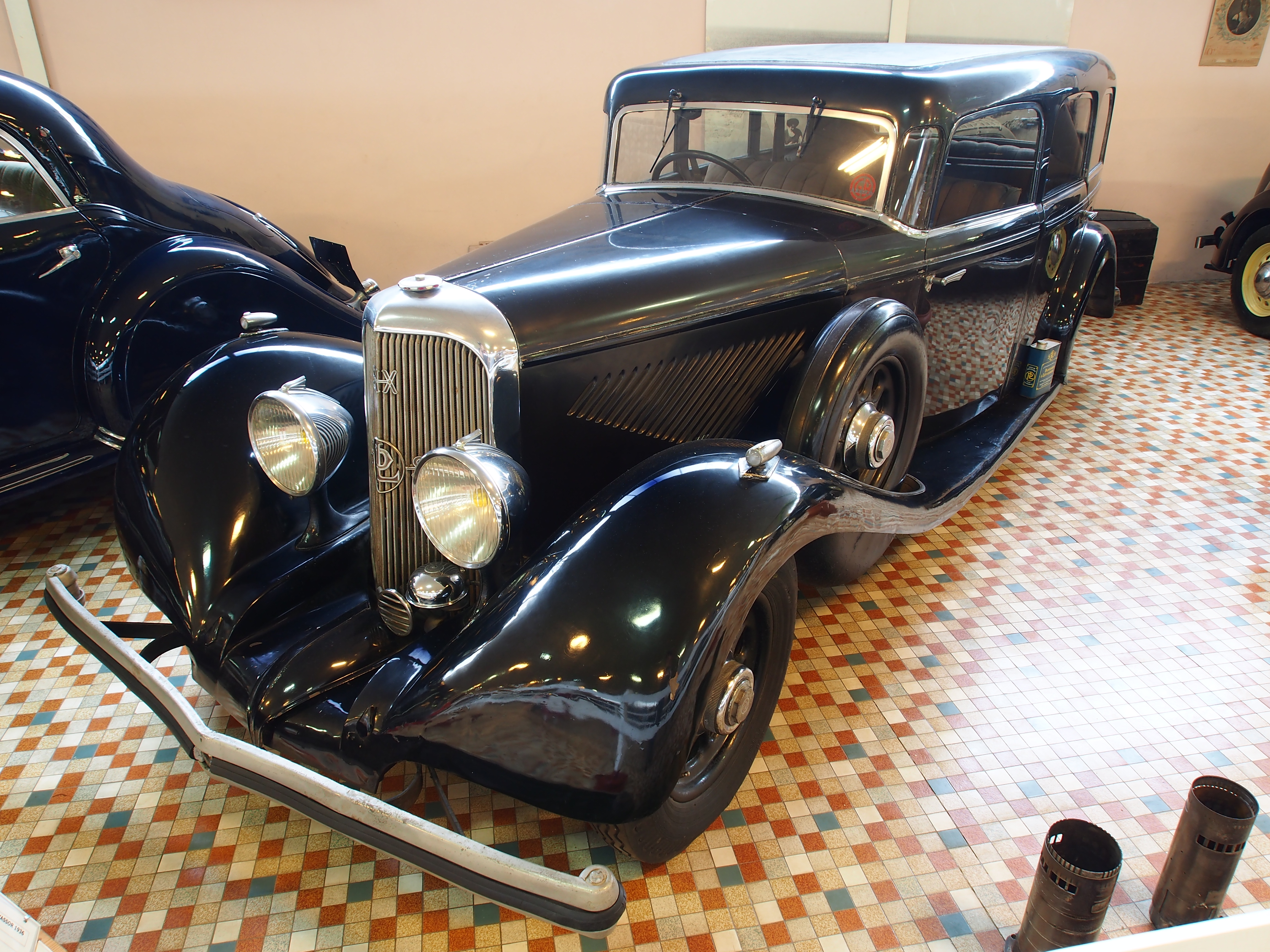
1936 Panhard et Levassor Panoramique

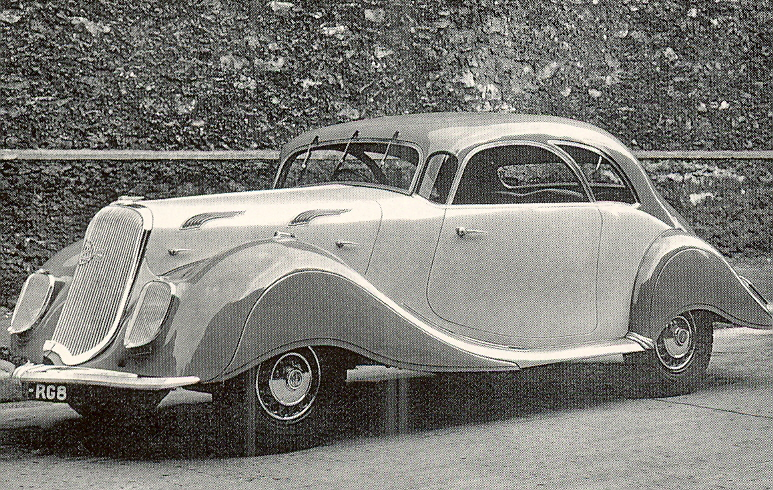
Panhard et Levassor Dynamic

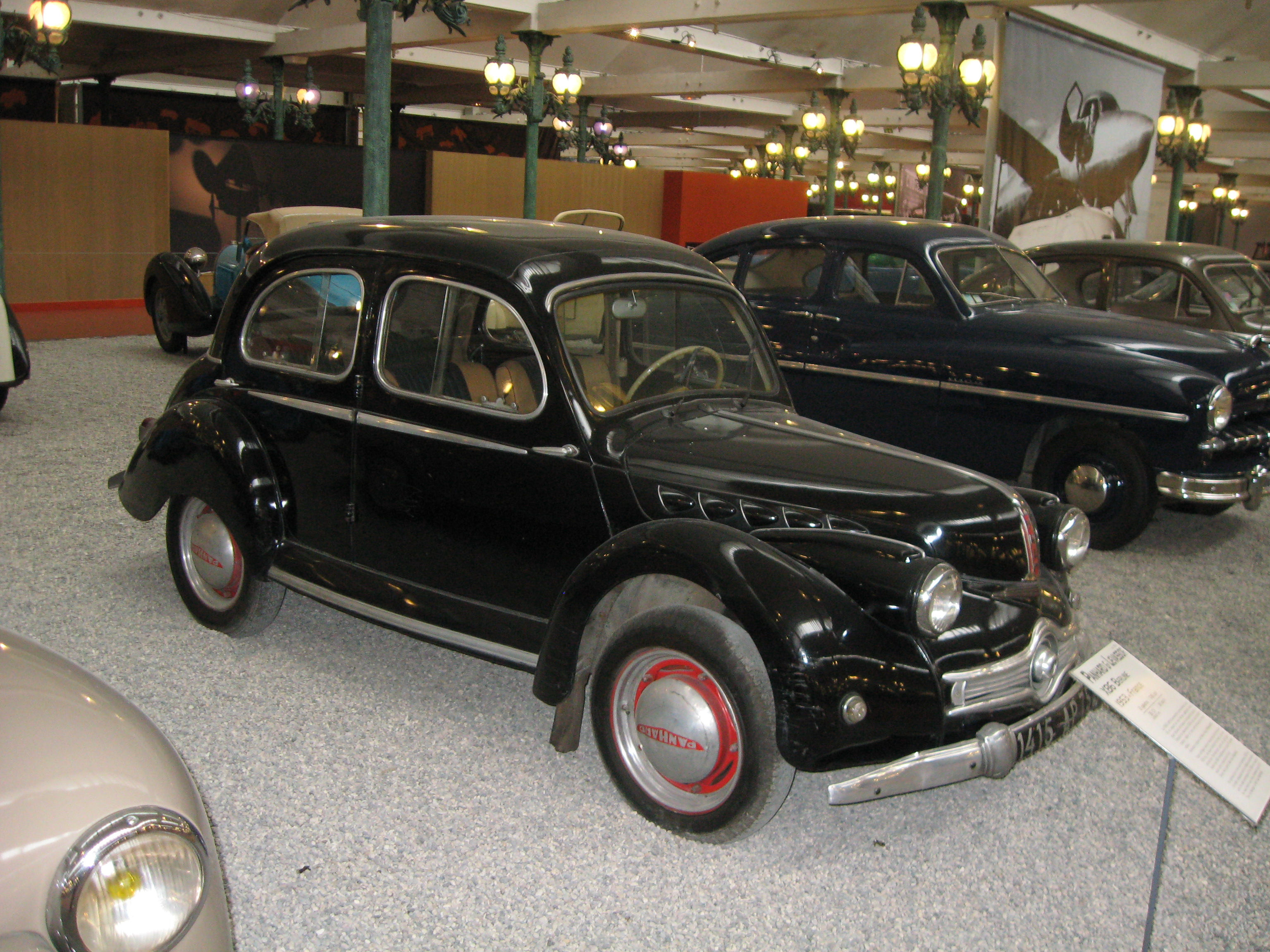
Panhard Dyna X berline

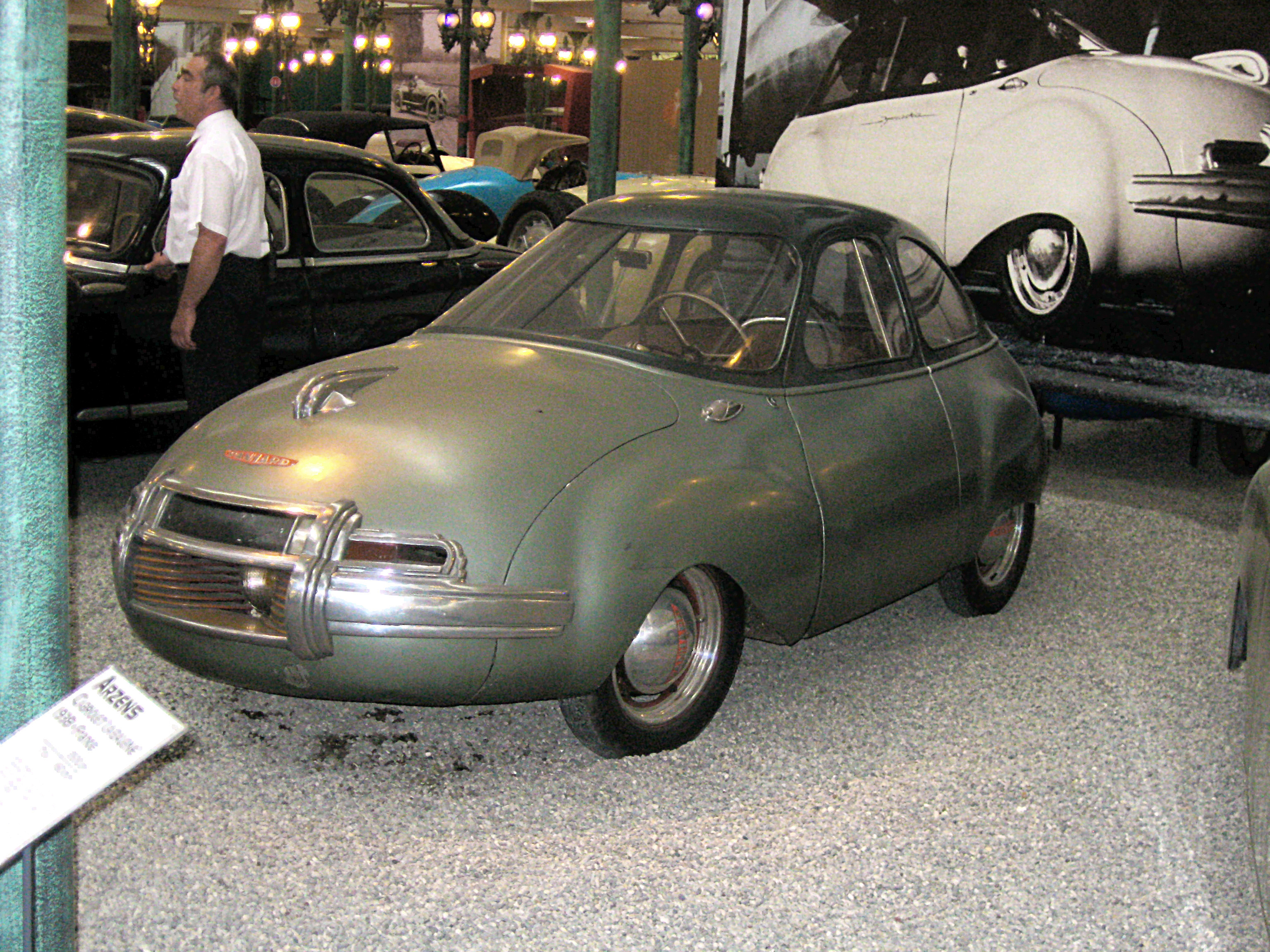
1948 Panhard Dynavia

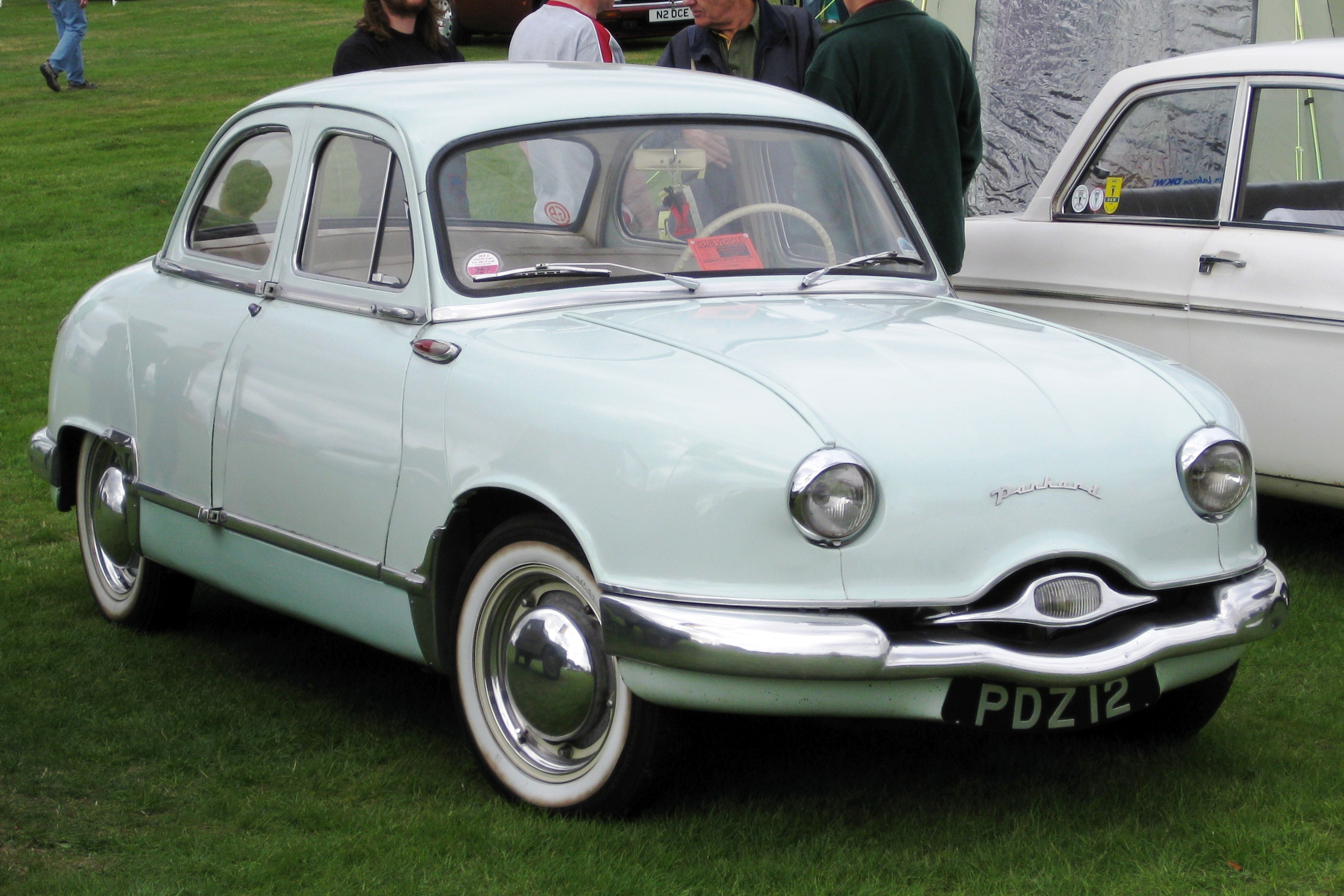
1958 Panhard Dyna Z

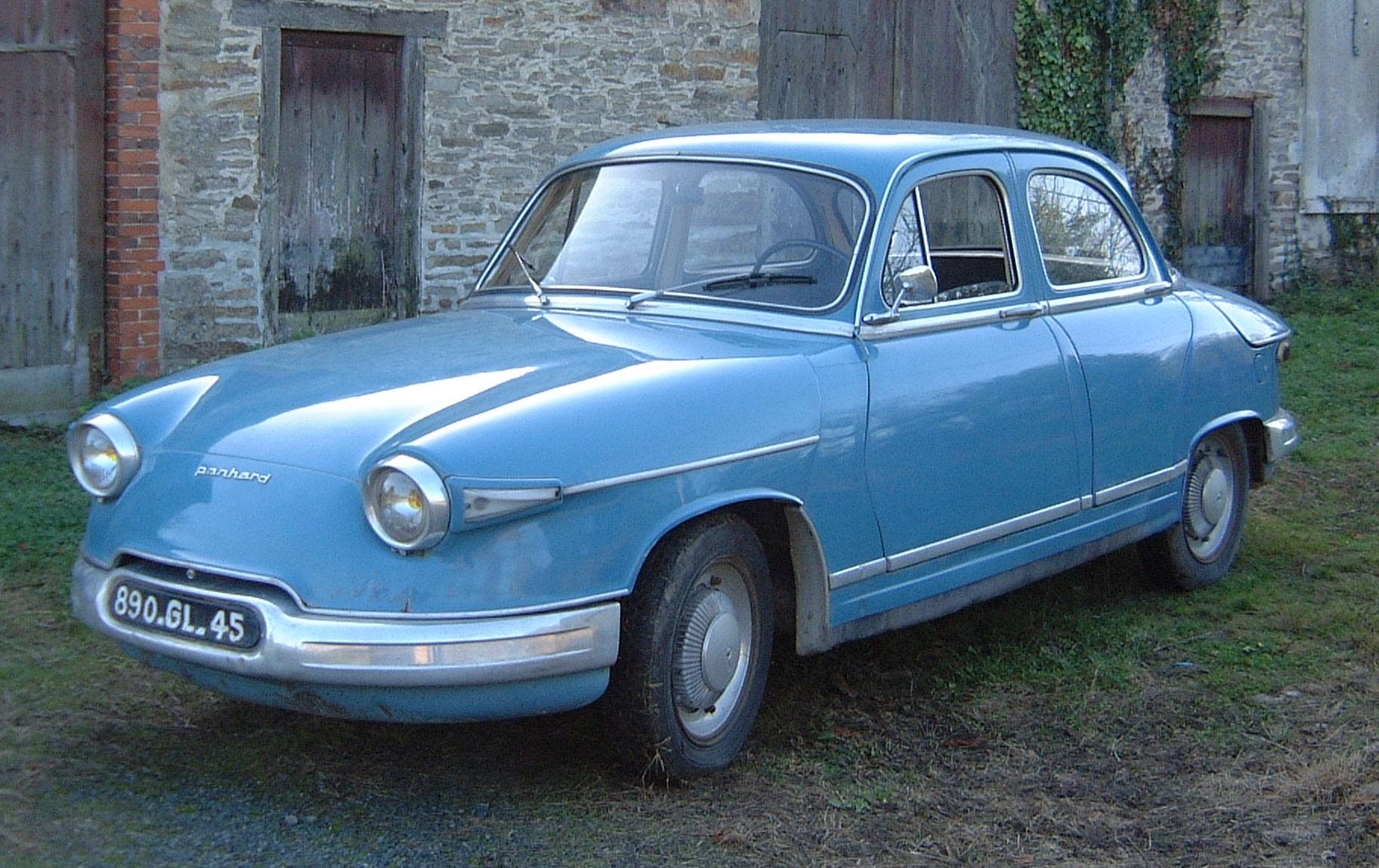
1964 Panhard PL17

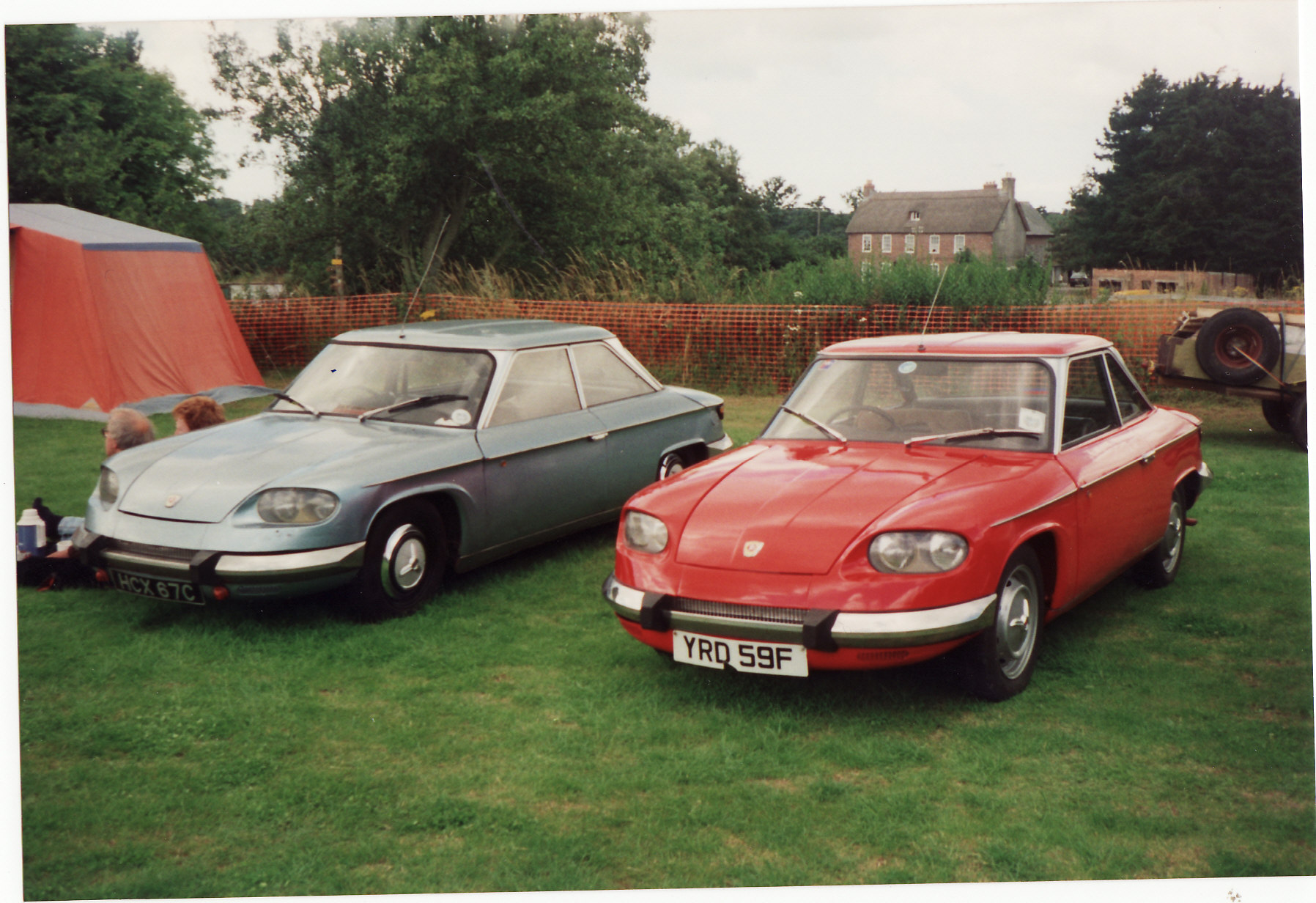
1965 24BT (l) and 1967 24CT (r)

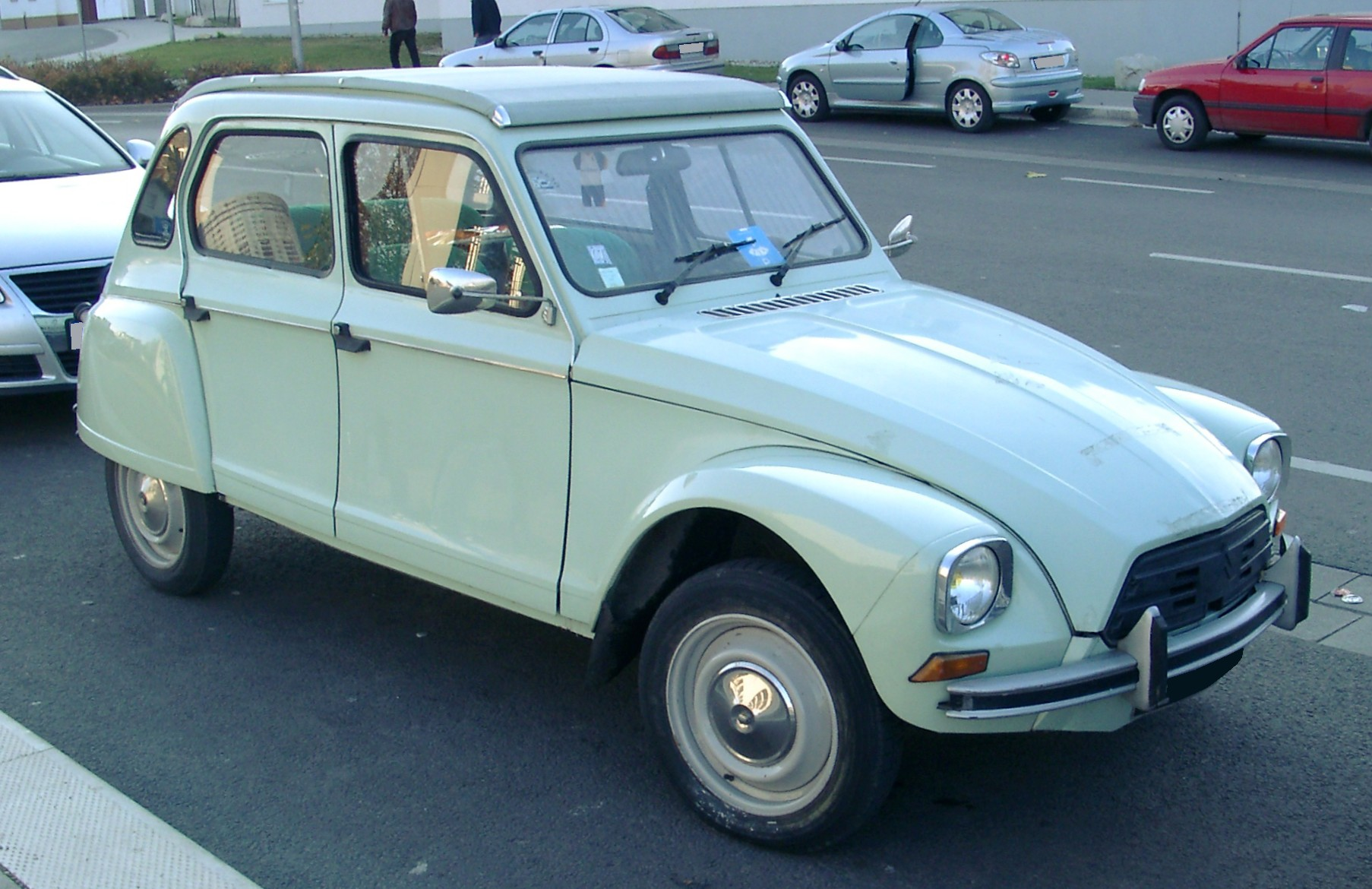
Citroën Dyane
