= Petrus Scheltema Beduin =

Dutch professional cyclist and car sales man

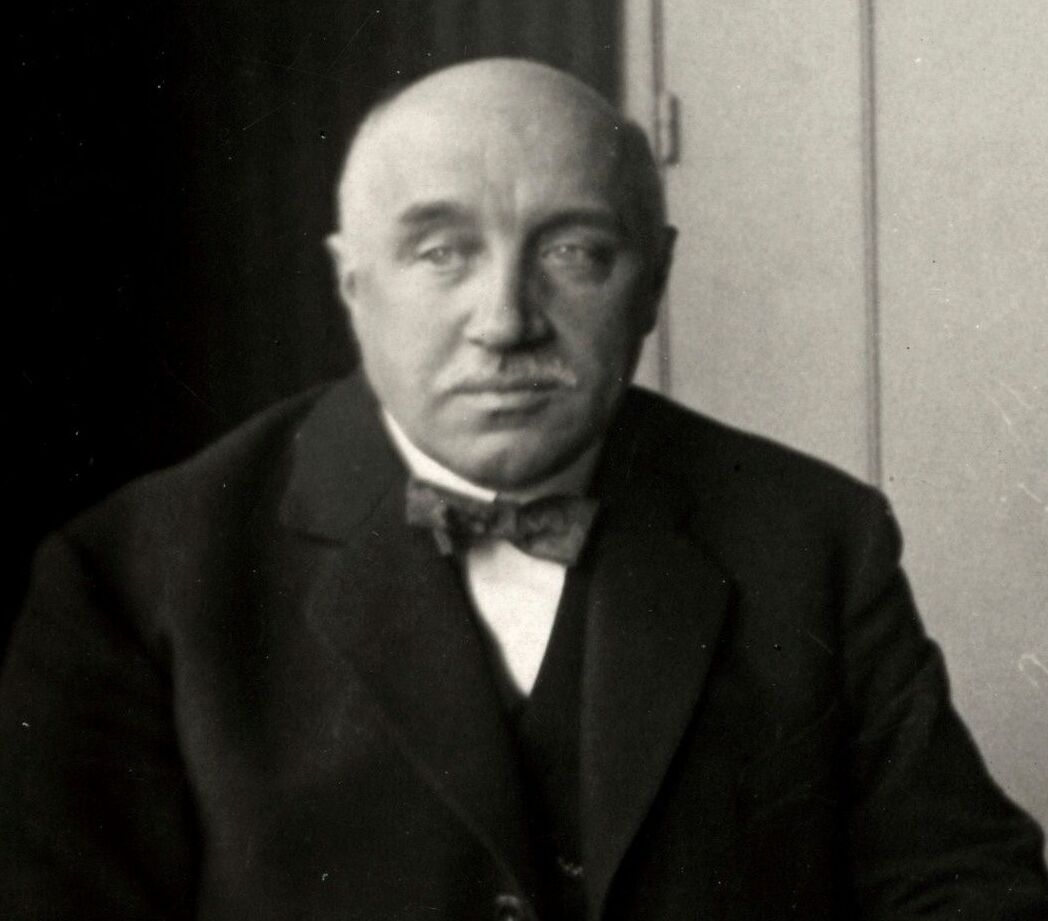
- Petrus Willem Scheltema Beduin

Personal information
- Born: Petrus Willem Scheltema Beduin; August 8, 1869; Amsterdam, Netherlands
- Died: April 10, 1928 (aged 58); Amsterdam, Netherlands

Petrus Willem Scheltema Beduin (born August 8, 1869 in Amsterdam, died April, 1928 in Amsterdam) was an early Dutch professional racing cyclist and vehicle salesman. In his later life he became known as the "first foreign car tourist in Norway".

Scheltema Beduin was born in Amsterdam to Peter Scheltema Beduin (1829–1904), a notary, and Magdalene Wilhelmina Gertruida Hoog (1838–1921).

From 1889 to 1894 he was employed at the British bicycle factory Surrey Machinist Co., manufacturer of the brand Invincible, in London. When the company went bankrupt in 1894, he moved to Paris to sell bicycles in cooperation with French racing cyclist Joseph Huzelstein. In 1896, Beduin became a partner in the cycling company Augustine & Witteveen in Amsterdam. The company later came to be involved in the sale of cars. In February 1899, at age 29, he was elected secretary of the Dutch Bicycle Industry Association (R.I.), later extended into the Dutch Bicycle and Automotive Industry Association (R.A.I.).

In 1908 he married Catharine de Ruiter (1875–1928).

== Career as a racing cyclist ==
Beduin competed professionally in numerous bicycle, tricycle and tandem races across Europe Western Europe starting in 1886, at the age of 16. His strongest year was 1891, when he won prizes at the National Cycling Union Championships in Bristol, the annual league competitions in Arnhem, the Dutch Championship, the Championship of the Mainland and the Catford Cup in London.

Over the following years his performance slowly degraded, but he remained an important figure in the sport both as a trainer and racer. In 1894 Beduin was appointed by the English Federation to an advisory committee on the differences between England and the continent, a testament to his standing in the English cycling world. His professional career as a racer officially ended in 1895.

He is credited with first introducing the new pneumatic tire to the Netherlands when he brought his new bicycle from England to a race in Scheveningen on June 29, 1890.

== Car journeys to Switzerland and Norway ==
Beduin had become a fan of the new automobile when his company Augustine & Witteveen entered the car trade as a second source of income around 1898.

In August 1900, he completed the 1,878 kilometres from Arnhem in the Netherlands to Zurich and Lucerne in Switzerland, the Vosges mountain range in France, and back, crossing the Gotthard Pass. Dutch car importer Philip Joseph Stokvis and his mechanic Rosier accompanied Beduin in a Daimler Duc-Tonneau car with a six horsepower engine. The initial plan had been to just make a trip along the Rhine, but after extensive tests during the months prior, Beduin and Stokvis became convinced it could be extended much farther.

The following year, Beduin departed with Stokvis and Rosie for Norway. This time the trip was made in a Panhard et Lavasor vehicle equipped with an aluminum body. The car was chain-powered, had a four-cylinder, 8 horsepower engine and a transmission with four gears. Six inner tubes made by Continental and two Michelin reserve tires were added. The wheels, originally with different dimensions at the front and rear, were replaced with four equal wheels so every wheel could be replaced with any other.

The journey first led them to Sweden via Bremen, Kiel and Fredrikshavn. After a short delay in Sweden due to problems with importing the car, the vehicle was shipped to Kristiania (now Oslo), where the party finally arrived on August 9, 1901. At that time only four cars existed in the country. Most roads were not equipped for motorized vehicle traffic. There were no gas stations, gasoline could - at best - be bought at pharmacies. The party had been able to forward gasoline containers to the hotels between Arnhem and Sweden, but in Norway the required quality turned out not to be in stock contrary to previously obtained information. After a long search, 100 liters of matching gasoline were found at a paint shop and loaded onto the car.

Norwegian authorities charged Beduin an import fee of 200 Norwegian Krone for the car, equivalent to around 1,800 USD or 1,600 Euro in 2026. The government Technical Committee also required lengthy checks to ensure the capabilities of the Panhard et Lavasor.

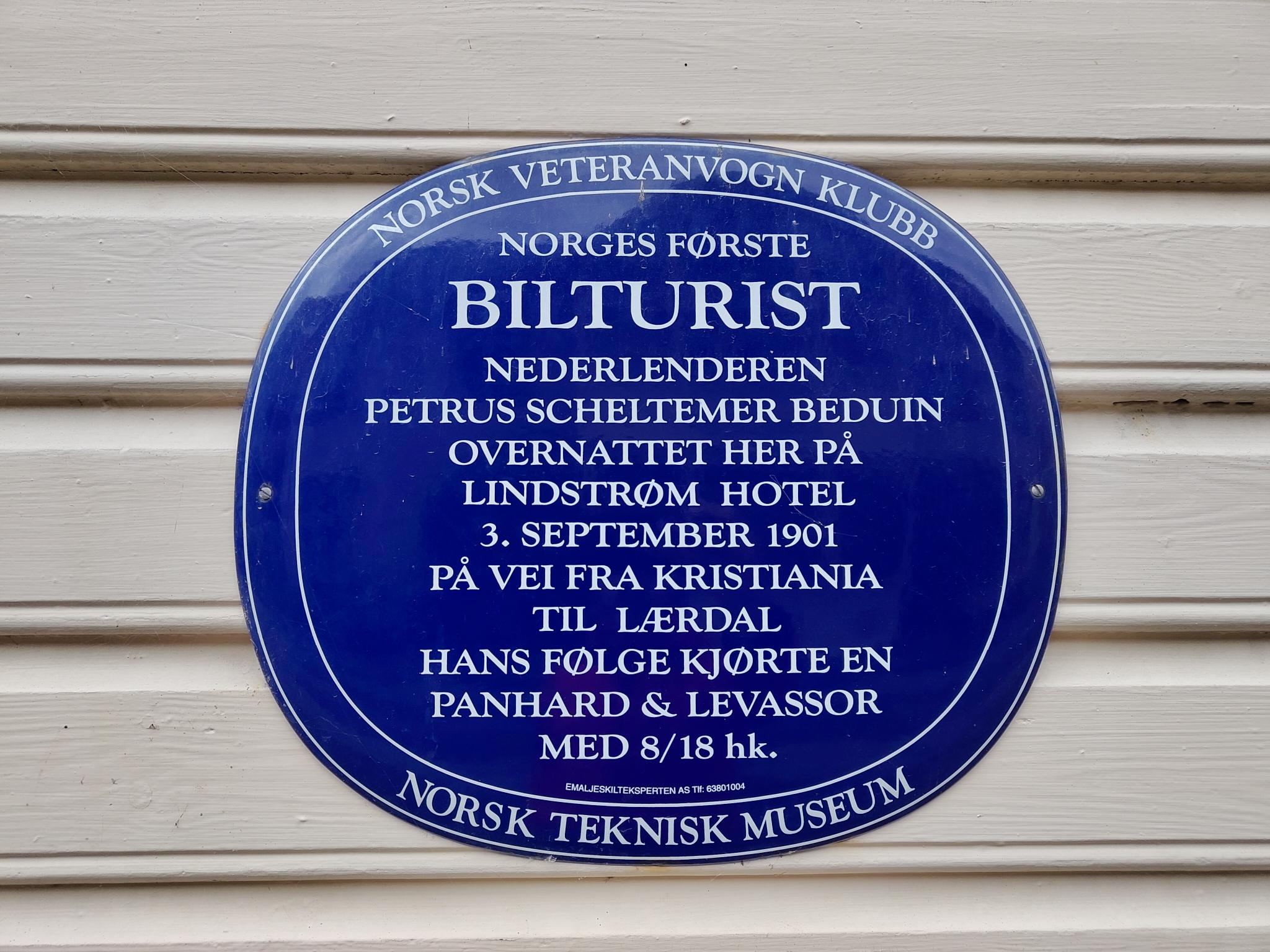
A plaque commemorating Petrus Scheltema Beduins stay at Lindstrøm Hotel in Lærdal, the end point of his car journey through Norway

The drive continued for around 350 kilometers from Kristiania to Lærdalsøyri at Sognefjord in Western Norway. The new motor vehicle was met with huge interest by the local population and journalists. At Nes near Buskerud, the car was unable to drive up a particularly steep hill in front of a large audience and had to be pulled up by horses. It took the party nearly a month to reach their final destination due to the bad state of the roads and missing maps. The county border to Lærdalsøyri was finally crossed on September 3, 1901. From Lærdalsøyri the car was shipped to Bergen and then back to the Netherlands by boat.

A memorial stone and plaques commemorating Beduin as the first car tourist in Norway ("Norges første Bilturist") have been installed by the Norwegian Museum of Science and Technology at places along the route.

In August 1907, Beduin went on a second trip to Switzerland accompanied by J. Leonard Lang, then president of the Dutch Bicycle and Automotive Industry Association (R.A.I.), and Prof. C.L. Dake, director of the Rijksacademie voor Beeldende Kunsten in Amsterdam, in a Belgian Germain car.

== Recognition ==
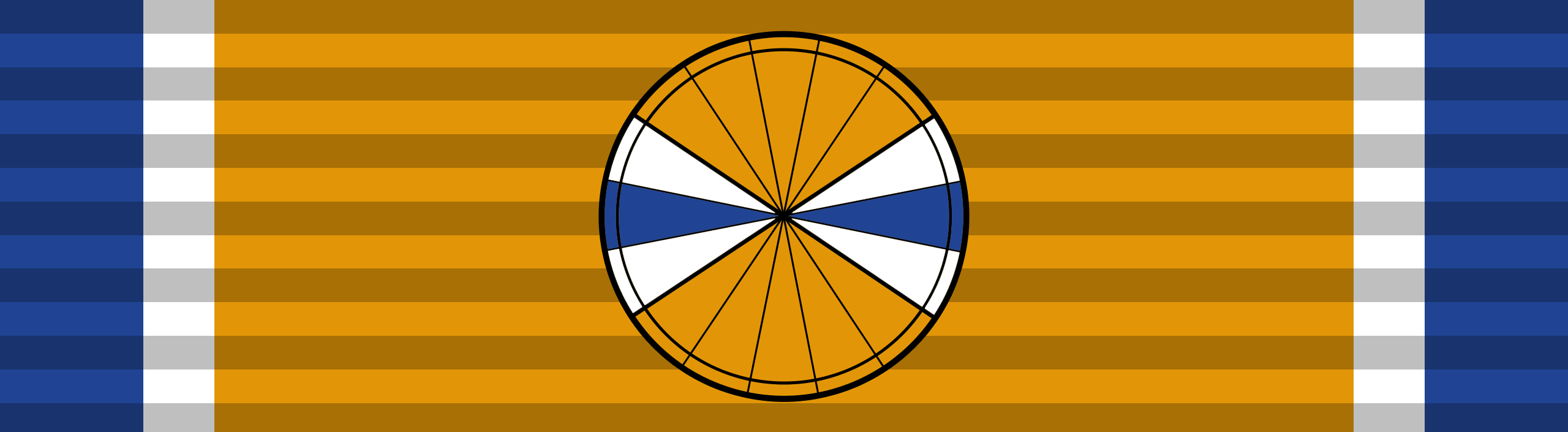
Order of Orange-Nassau - Knight

In 1924, he was awarded the rank of Knight in the Order of Orange Nassau.
