= René Ducassou-Péhau =

French engineer (1927–2006)

- Born: July 11, 1927; Basque Country, France
- Died: July 15, 2006 (aged 79); Labourd, France
- Occupation: Automobile designer

René Ducassou-Péhau (11 July 1927 – 15 July 2006) was a French automobile designer. He was born in Basque country, and died in Labourd. He is best known for his work with car manufacturer Panhard.

== Career ==
Ducassou-Péhau was hired by Panhard on 1 March 1960. He worked as an engineer in the Bureau d'Études et de Recherches Carrosserie (Office of Bodywork Studies and Research), or BERC, and became assistant to Louis Bionier, Panhard's head of chassis development and chief stylist. He was involved in designing some of the last Panhard cars built. Bionier's first commission for Ducassou-Péhau was to carry out stylistic revisions of the PL 17 model. Next Ducassou-Péhau and André Jouan were assigned to the V527 project, which became the Panhard 24.

Citroën completed its takeover of Panhard in 1965. In 1967 Bionier was given the task of updating the Citroën 2CV to respond to new models from Renault. Ducassou-Péhau produced much of the original work on the update, but these were considered too radical. Pierre Bercot asked Jacques Charreton, protégé of Robert Opron, for revisions, and the car later went into production as the Citroën Dyane.

Ducassou-Péhau originated the concept of a fixed central steering wheel hub that contained critical driver's controls and information displays. This concept eventually appeared in the 2004 Citroën C4.
