= Panhard CS =

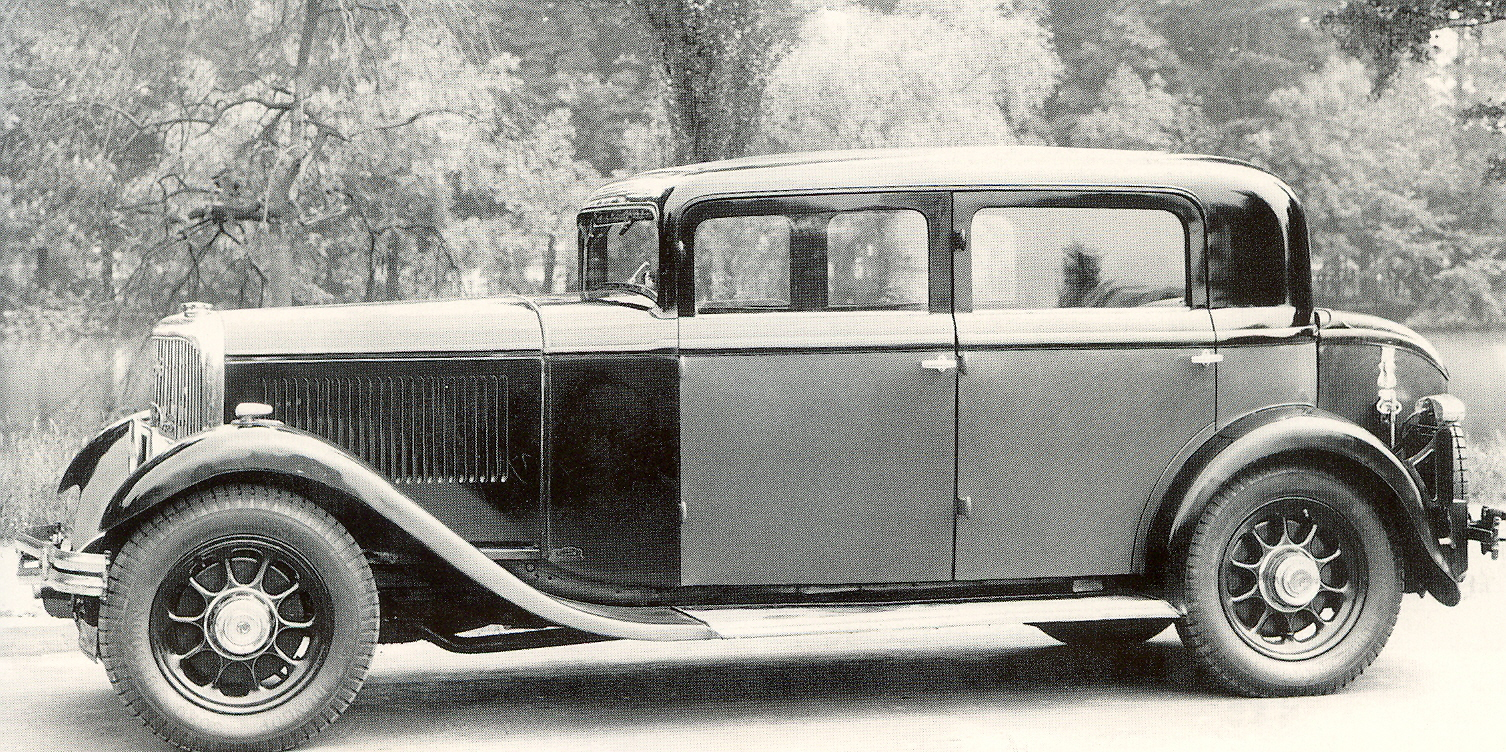
- Panhard & Levassor 6CS Limousine X68 YERAN (1931)

Overview
- Manufacturer: Panhard & Levassor
- Production: 1930–1938
- Assembly: France: Paris

Body and chassis
- Body style: Sedan/saloon/berline, Cabriolet, Coupé; Various coach built bodies supplied in relatively small numbers by a number of coach builders.
- Layout: FR layout

Powertrain
- Engine: 2,344 cc 6 cylinder in-line sleeve-valve engine (1930-1932); 2,516 cc 6 cylinder in-line sleeve-valve engine (1930-1938); 2,861 cc 6 cylinder in-line sleeve-valve engine (CS Spécial from 1934)
- Transmission: 4-speed with "free-wheel" from 1932

Dimensions
- Wheelbase: 3,170 mm (124.8 in)

The Panhard CS is a luxury car, most commonly sold with a four-door sedan/saloon body, introduced by Panhard & Levassor at the end of 1929 for the 1930 model year. It was presented as a smaller companion model to the 8-cylinder Panhard DS model. Publicity of the time indicated the "S" in the name stood for "surbaissées" (the cars having an "underslung" chassis.)

The car was launched with a 6-cylinder in-line Sleeve valve engine of 2,344 cc, placing it in the 13CV car tax band. The factory bodied "CS Type X68" four door sedan/saloon/berline offered seating for 4/5 people and had a separate luggage locker at the back. There were also various coupé and Cabriolet bodied cars produced. By 1932, when the "Type X68" gave way to the "Type X72", 1,028 of the former had been produced.

Produced in parallel with the "Panhard CS Type X68" was the "Panhard 6 CS Spécial / Type X69 Spécial", produced between 1930 and 1933 with a slightly larger 2,516 cc 6-cylinder in-line engine during which time 1,310 were produced.

In 1932 the "Type X68" was replaced by the "Type X72" which was also known as the "Panhard CS RL". "RL" stood for "roue libre", indicating that the otherwise classic 4-speed transmission incorporated a "free-wheel" device. The "Type X72" used the 2,516 cc 6-cylinder previously reserved for the "CS Spécial", which placed it in the 14CV car tax band. There were also "Panhard CS RL2" versions of the car offered with a "short" 2,800 mm (110.2 in) or a "long" 3,340 mm (131.5 in) wheelbase. The complexity of the naming was reduced in 1935 after which the car was branded simply as the "Panhard CS". 2,173 of these "Type X72" CSs were produced before the version was replaced in 1936.

In 1934 the bodywork was upgraded. The new and much vaunted "Panoramique" versions had a three-piece front windscreen. The main screen was still conventionally flat, but the A-pillars were distinguished by narrow curved glass panels. Cars thus equipped carried in their names the suffix "RL-N".

1934 also saw the "6 CS Spécial / Type X69" replaced by the "CS Spécial / Type X73". The engine was again enlarged, to 2,861 cc, placing the car now in the 16CV tax band. Between 1934 and 1937 1,535 Type X73s were produced

Although the CS Types X72 and X73 were still exhibited at the Motor Show in October 1936 as available for the 1937 model year (and still, according to some sources, listed again for 1938) they were effectively replaced by the manufacturer's "Dynamic 130 Type X76" in October 1936. The older model's production life may have been inadvertently prolonged by the very high prices that Panhard were initially trying to charge for the new "Dynamic" models.

== Sources and notes ==
- Bernard Vermeylen: Panhard & Levassor. Entre tradition et modernité. ETAI, Boulogne-Billancourt 2005, ISBN 2-7268-9406-2.
