= Panhard et Levassor Dynamic =

Panhard et Levassor Dynamic 130, 140, 160
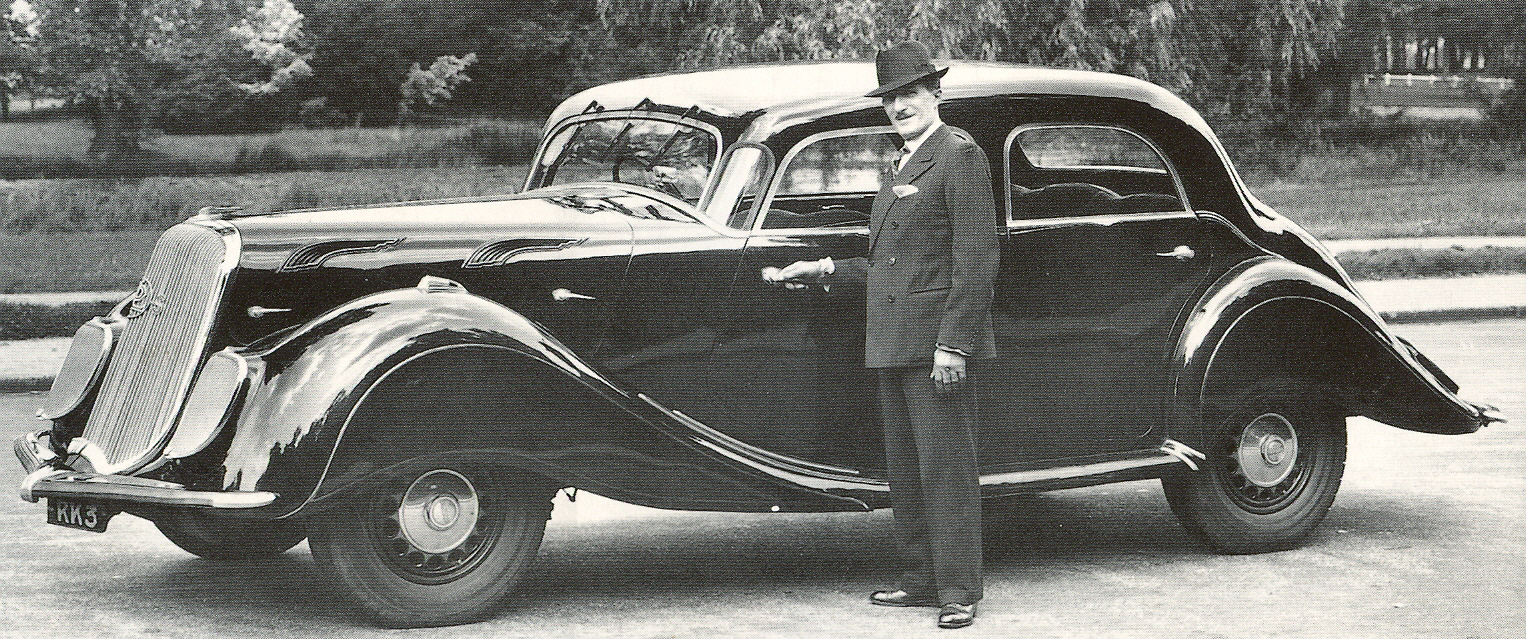

Overview
- Manufacturer: Société des Anciens Etablissements Panhard et Levassor
- Production: 1936–1940; 2,742 produced
- Assembly: Porte d'Ivry district, Paris
- Designer: Louis Bionier

Body and chassis
- Class: Large car
- Body style: 4-door saloon 4-door “6-light” saloon 2-door coupé 2-door cabriolet
- Layout: Front engine, rear-wheel drive

Powertrain
- Engine: 2516 cc - 3834 cc sleeve-valve I6

Dimensions
- Wheelbase: 2,600 mm (102 in); 2,800 mm (110 in); 3,000 mm (118 in)
- Length: 4,750 mm (187 in) to 5,150 mm (203 in)
- Width: 1,900 mm (75 in)

The Panhard et Levassor Dynamic is a large car produced by the French auto-maker Panhard et Levassor from 1936 to 1940 as a replacement for the company’s CS. It was introduced at the Paris Motor Show in October 1936.

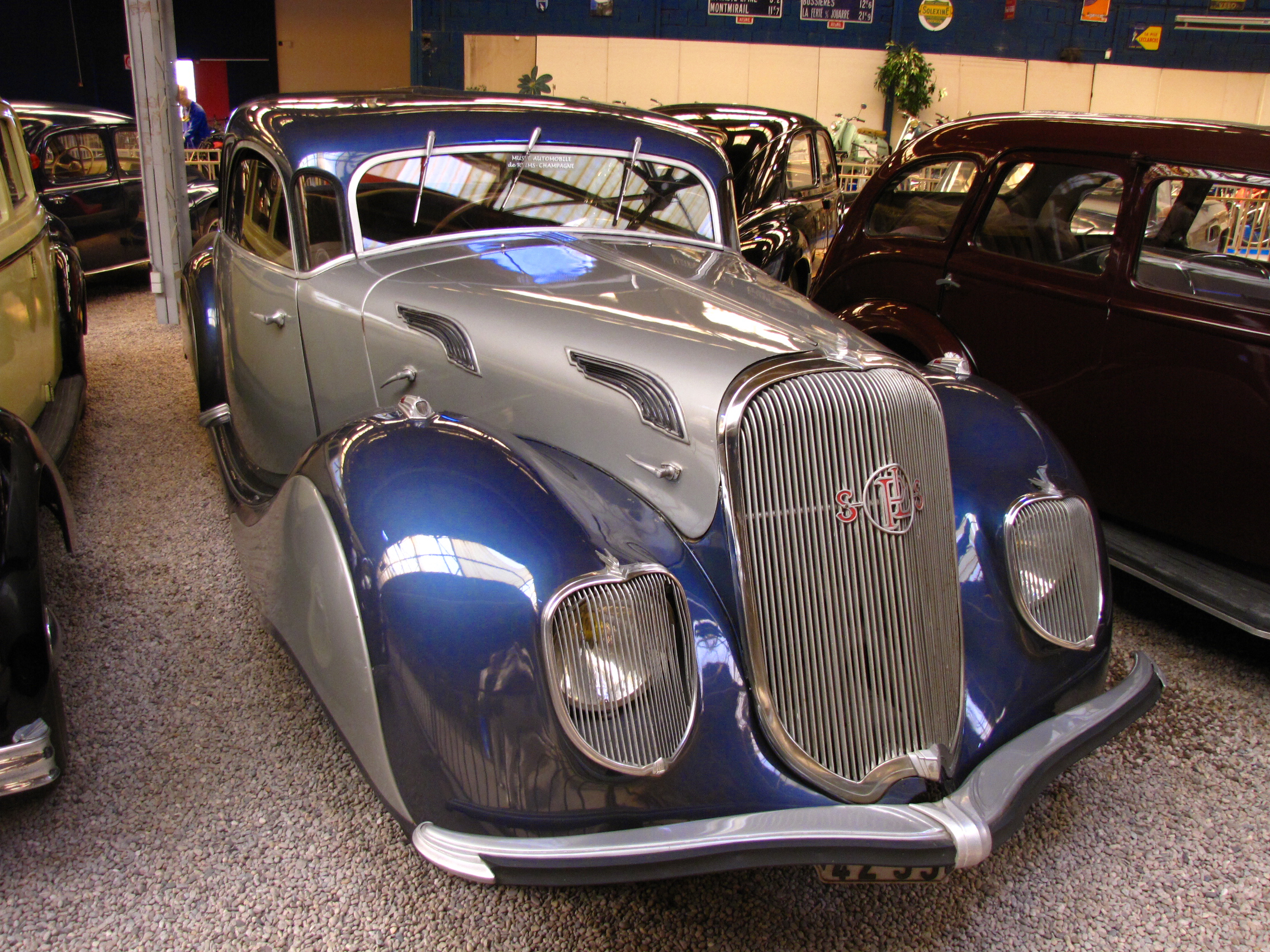
1936 Dynamic 130 (X76)

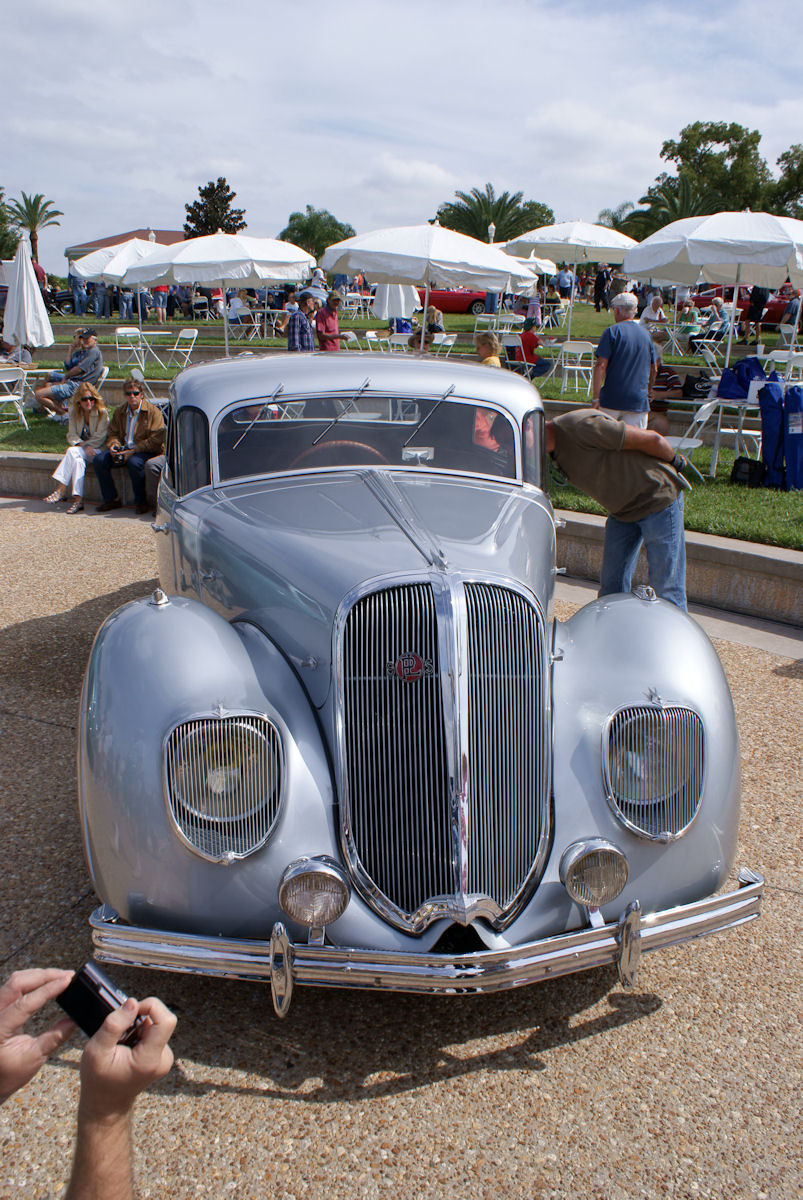
1938 Dynamic 140

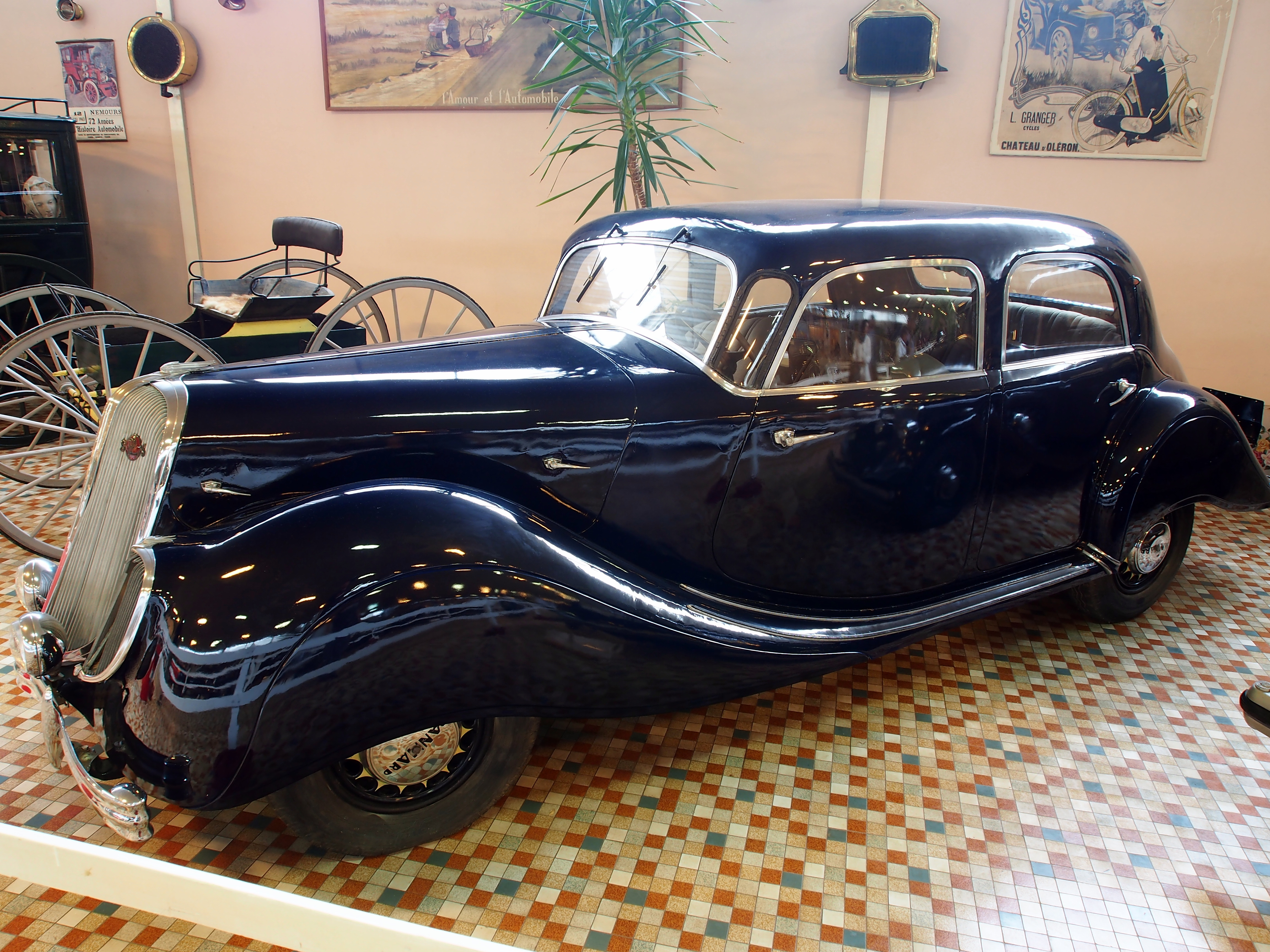
Dynamic (X77)

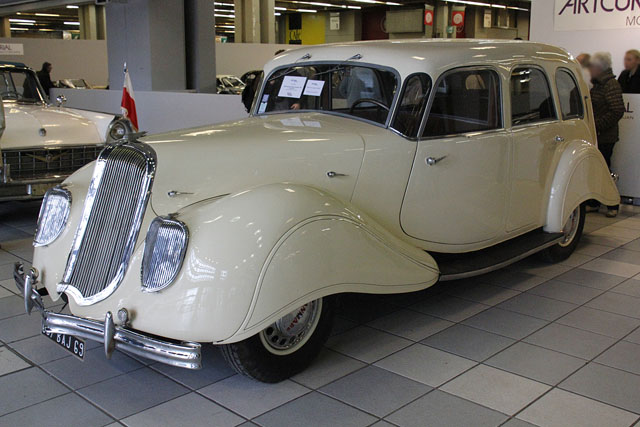
1939 Dynamic 140 six-light Limousine (X81)

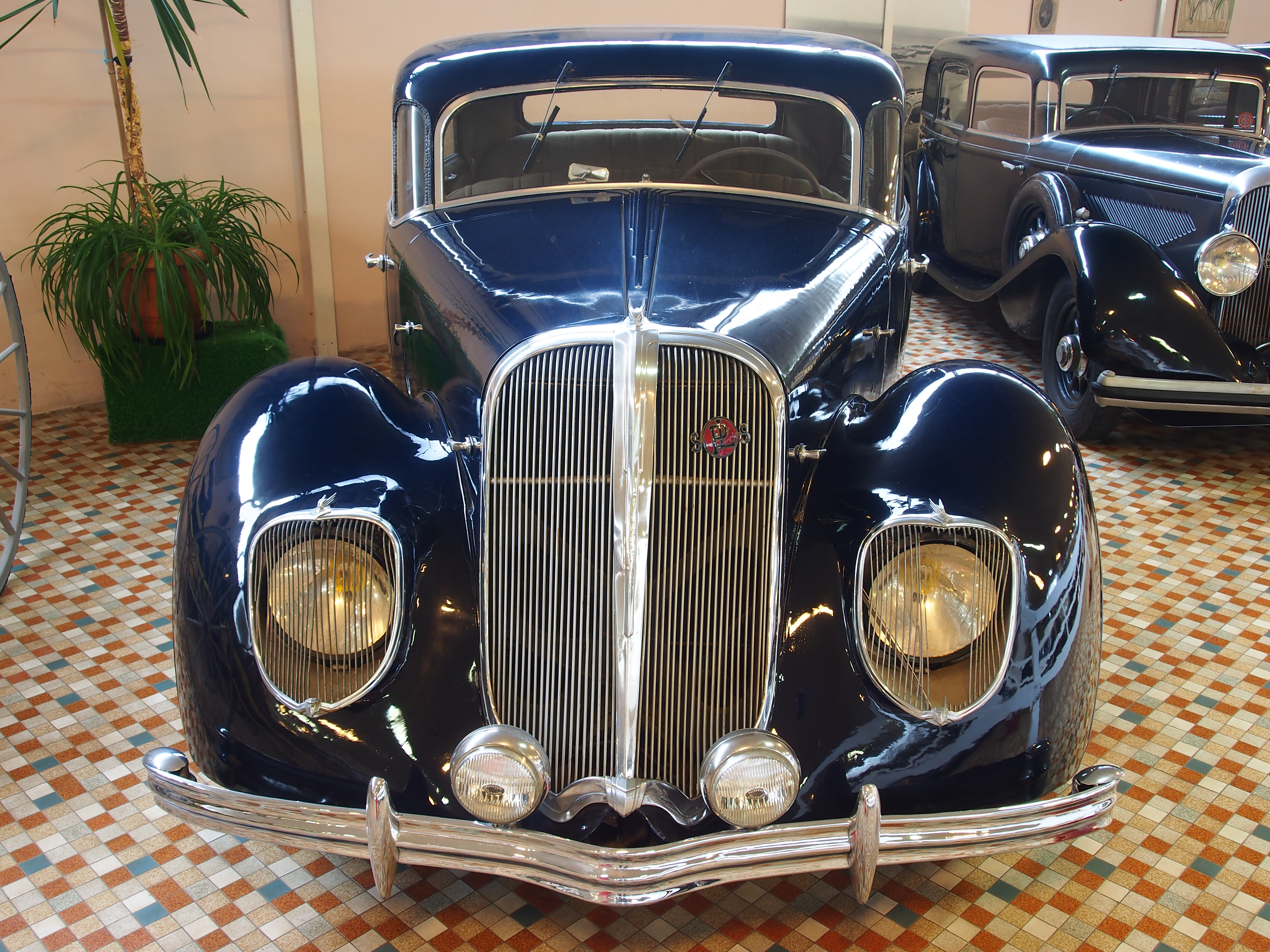
Dynamic (X77)

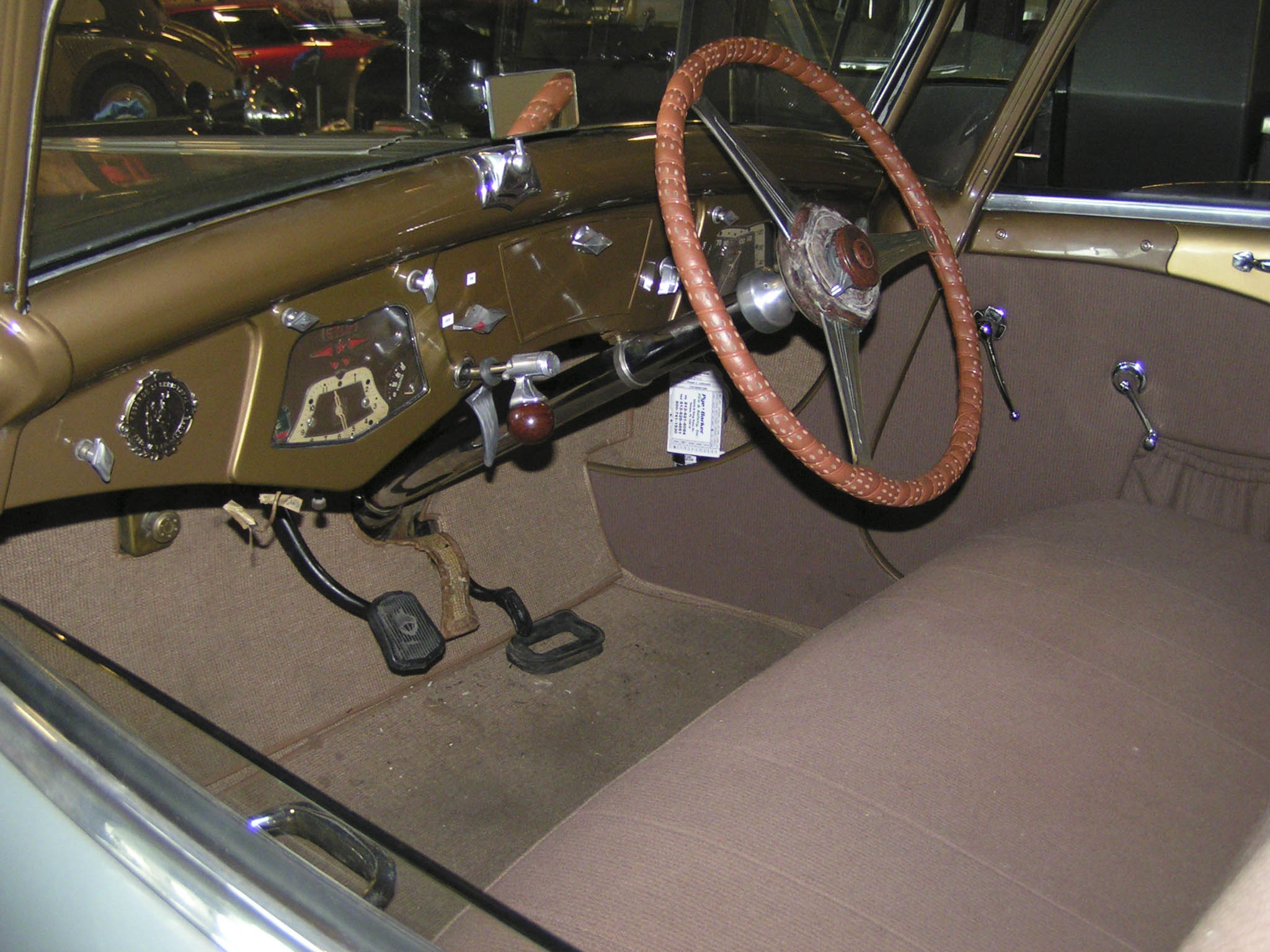
Panhard Dynamic with steering wheel in the middle of the front panel

== The bodies ==
For the Dynamic, Panhard et Levassor’s in-house designer Louis Bionier came up with a Streamline Moderne design, featuring front and rear wheel spats, two or three windscreen wipers and the split A pillars with curved glass inserts he pioneered on the earlier Panoramique. The headlights were integrated into the front wings, with headlamp surrounds that mimicked the shape of the front grille. Several of these features caught on with other auto-makers in subsequent years; headlamps integrated into the bodywork became mainstream, but in 1936 they gave the car a very modern look.

The bodies were also of great technical interest. Despite its size, the Dynamic offered little comfort to traditional coachbuilders, being the first French car in the luxury class to feature a steel body electrically welded together and constructed as a monocoque, without a separate chassis.

A “six-light” four-door saloon/sedan bodied version was offered with a long passenger cabin, but no trunk/boot. This version, introduced in the fall of 1937, could seat nine. A four-door saloon/sedan (“berline”) was also available with a shorter passenger cabin, but with a protruding boot/trunk. The car was also unusually wide, allowing for three abreast seating: on early cars, Panhard et Levassor positioned the steering wheel in the middle of the front panel. It was hoped that this would provide a superior view out. The centrally mounted steering was probably the feature that attracted the most comment when the car appeared at the 1936 Paris Motor Show, and Panhard et Levassor advertised it as a "common sense" solution during a period when French automakers were switching over from right hand drive (which had been virtually universal in France twenty years earlier) to left hand drive (which would be virtually universal in France twenty years later). However, the market-place found the central steering wheel an innovation too far and drivers complained about the contortions necessary to slide from the side of the wide car to the central position necessary to control it. From 1939 the Panhard et Levassor Dynamic featured a conventionally positioned steering wheel.

Aside from the central seating position, the Dynamic was also ahead of its time in having independent wishbone front suspension. As with current supercars, the upper elements of the front suspension were mounted directly onto the engine.

There were also two-seater coupé versions and a cabriolet version offered, but by the end of 1938 these “minority“ models had accounted for only 358 cars. In addition to these and the sedans, a six-window Limousine with an available partition was introduced in 1938.

== Engines ==
A first prototype, known as the Dynamic 20 CV, was presented in March 1936. This was powered by a six-cylinder in-line engine of 3,485 cm^{3} with cylinder diameters that indeed corresponded with the French 20 hp taxation class. However, the car that entered production and was offered for sale from May 1935 as the Dynamic 130 came with the six-cylinder in-line sleeve-valve engine of 2,516 cc from the predecessor model, the Panhard et Levassor CS. This placed it in the French 14 CV taxation class. The "130" in the name was to indicate a claimed top speed of 130 km/h (81 mph).

Along with the Dynamic 130, Panhard et Levassor offered a Dynamic 140, which shared its engine with the (initially still in production) “CS Spécial” model. The engine size on this version was 2.861 cc (16 CV). Actual claimed horsepower was 75 hp (55 kW) and it was this “Dynamic 140” that was the most popular with customers, 2,230 having been produced by 1940 when war brought production to an end. By this time the car had become the last production sleeve-valve-engined car in the world.

== Variants ==
While three wheelbases were available, the shortest was largely restricted to the (soon discontinued) Coupé Junior model and the longest to the Berline. Most Dynamics (Majors) ended up having the 280 cm wheelbase. In 1937 Panhard et Levassor introduced a range topping “Dynamic 160”, as a successor to the Panhard et Levassor DS. This car was fitted with a 3834 cc (22 CV) version of the Panhard et Levassor six-cylinder in-line engine, with 100 PS (74 kW). 153 had been produced by 1938.

The small Dynamic 130 carried the X76 model code; it was discontinued for 1938. The 140 and 160 were originally called X77 and X80, after the move away from central steering for 1939 they became the X81 and X82 respectively.

== Commercial ==
Panhard et Levassor Dynamics were never particularly cheap, which reflected the technological progress that they represented. However, less than six months after the October 1936 launch Panhard et Levassor updated their price list, many the prices published in February 1937 involving eye-watering increases of more than 20%. After February 1937 the short wheelbase "Junior 130" (coupe) 14CV Dynamic was priced at 53,850 Francs while prices for the four door "Berline 130" started at 58,850 Francs. For comparison, the Renault Primaquatre, admittedly an older and less flamboyant design from a manufacturer who still fitted side-valve engines in all its models, but nonetheless with an engine size and wheelbase length that also placed it squarely in the same 14CV category as the Panhard et Levassor, was priced at 22,500 Francs for a "Berline" (saloon/sedan) in October 1936, which had risen to 25,500 Francs in October 1937 Price lists from Talbot, whose Minor was launched in October 1937 with a list of 42,500 Francs for a 13CV four seater compact four door "Berline" from a manufacturer with a more modern model range, also left the listed prices for the Panhard et Levassor Dynamic looking optimistically high.

== Wartime production ==
In September 1939 France declared war on Germany and in June 1940 the German Army rapidly invaded and occupied Northern France. Before September 1939, unlike Renault, Panhard et Levassor had not supplied cars to the French army, but with the outbreak of war Panhard et Levassor received an order for 182 of the larger-engined Dynamics, with the emphasis on the long cabined “six-light” sedans/salons. The army cars, generally reserved for senior ranks, are in most instances recognisable from the spare wheel mounted on the outside of the rear panel. Civilian versions, even with the long cabin body, kept the spare wheel inside the car.

As the war progressed, Panhard et Levassor found it prudent to transfer production to their site at Tarbes in the extreme southwest, and a gazogene powered version of the Dynamic was produced albeit only in small numbers. However, following the defeat of France in June 1940 Panhard et Levassor, along with other auto-makers was increasingly obliged to manufacture military supplies.

== Sources and further reading ==
- Bellu, René (November 1996). "La Panhard Dynamic: Sa carosserie étonne et sa conception technique réserve elle aussi des surprises" [Its surprising appearance and concept still hides some surprises]. Automobilia (in French) (7). Paris: Histoire & Collections: 31–40.
- Vermeylen, Bernard (2005), Panhard & Levassor entre tradition et modernité [Panhard & Levassor: between tradition and modernity] (in French), Boulogne-Billancourt: ETAI, ISBN 2-7268-9406-2
