= Rogues' gallery (disambiguation) =

A rogues' gallery is a collection of images used by police to identify suspects.

In fiction, a rogues gallery is a collection of frequently recurring villains for a hero, especially in Superhero fiction.

Rogues' gallery or rogues gallery may also refer to:

== Films ==
- Rogues' Gallery (1944 film), a film directed by Albert Herman
- Rogue's Gallery (1968 film), a film directed by Leonard J. Horn
- Operation: Endgame, a 2010 film originally titled The Rogues Gallery

== Music ==
- Rogues Gallery, a 1985 album by the British rock group Slade
- Rogue's Gallery: Pirate Ballads, Sea Songs, and Chanteys, a 2006 compilation album

== Radio and television ==
- Rogue’s Gallery (radio series), 1940s NBC series
- Rogues' Gallery (TV series), a British series from the 1960s
- Rogues' Gallery (Gotham), an episode of the crime drama series Gotham

== Other uses ==
- Nemesis: Rogues' Gallery, a 2024–2025 comic book series by Mark Millar and Valerio Giangiordano
- The Rogues Gallery, an accessory booklet for the first-edition Advanced Dungeons & Dragons game
- List of Batman family enemies, fictional villains in Batman comics often termed the "rogues gallery"
- Vigenère cipher, a cryptographic method also known as the "rogues' gallery cipher"

== See also ==
- Rogue (disambiguation)
