= Ford Skyliner =

Ford Skyliner may refer to several vehicles produced by Ford in the United States:

- Ford Crestline Skyliner, produced for the 1954 model year only
- Ford Fairlane Crown Victoria Skyliner, produced for the 1955 and 1956 model years
- Ford Fairlane 500 Skyliner, produced for the 1957, 1958 and 1959 model years
- Ford Galaxie Skyliner, produced for the 1959 model year only
- Ford Transit Skyliner, concept based on the 2015 model year Ford Transit 350 passenger van
