= List of coupé convertibles =

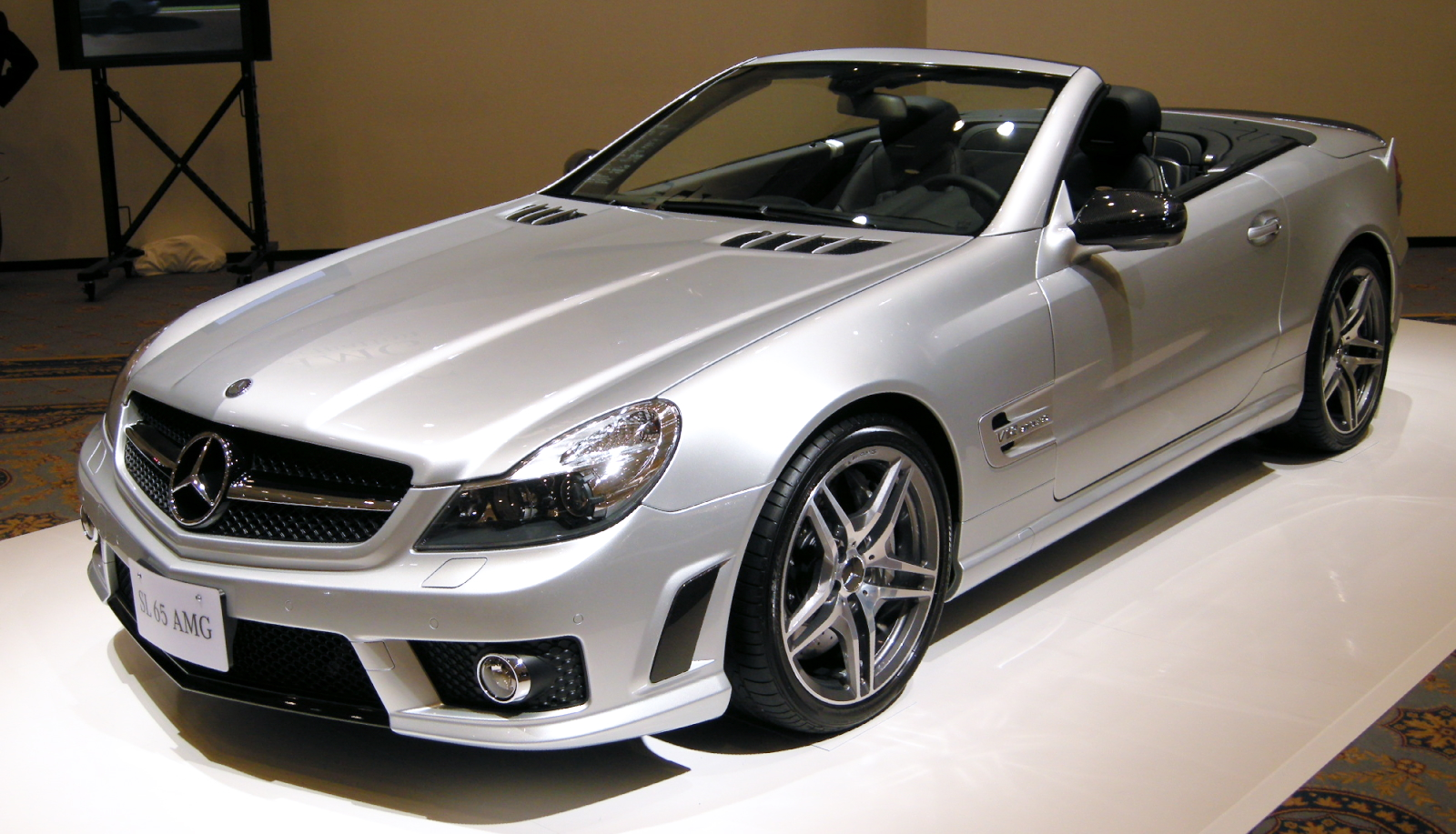
Mercedes-Benz SL65 AMG, a modern-day Retractable Hardtop.

List of coupé convertibles, also known as retractable hardtop, coupé cabriolet or roadster coupé.

== Classic cars ==
- Peugeot 302 Eclipse Décapotable (1936/1937)
- Peugeot 401 Eclipse Décapotable (1934/1935)
- Peugeot 402 Éclipse Décapotable (1935)
- Peugeot 601 C Eclipse (1934)
- Playboy Convertible (1947–1951)
- Ford Fairlane 500 (Galaxie) Skyliner (1957–1959)
- Gaylord Gladiator (1956)

== Modern cars ==
- BMW Z4 (E89) (2009–2016)
- BMW 3 Series (E93) (2007-2013)
  - Alpina B4 Bi-Turbo Convertible
  - BMW M3 (2008-2013)
- BMW 4 Series (F33) (2013–2020)
  - BMW M4 (2014–2020)
  - Alpina B4 Bi-Turbo Convertible
- Cadillac XLR (2004-2009)
- Chevrolet SSR (2003-2006)
- Chrysler Sebring/200 (2008-2014)
- Daihatsu Copen (L880) (2002-2012)
- Ferrari California (2008-2013)
- Ferrari California T (2014-2017)
- Ferrari Portofino (2017-2023)
- Ferrari 812 GTS (2019-2023)
- Ferrari 458 Spider (2012-2015)
- Ferrari 488 Spider (2015-2019)
- Ferrari F8 Spider (2019-2023)
- Ford Focus CC (2007–2011)
- Honda CR-X del Sol TransTop (1992–1998)
- Infiniti G/Q60 Convertible (2009-2015)
- Lexus SC 430/Toyota Soarer (2001–2010)
- Lexus IS 250/350 C (2009–2015)
- Mazda MX-5 PRHT (2006–2014)
- McLaren MP4-12C Spider (2011-2014)
- McLaren 650S Spider (2014-2017)
- McLaren 675LT Spider (2014-2017)
- Mercedes-Benz SLK-Class, later SLC class (1996–2020)
- Mercedes-Benz SL-Class (R230) (2001–2011)
- Mercedes-Benz SL-Class (R231) (2011–2020)
- Mitsubishi GTO/3000GT Spyder (1995–1996)
- Mitsubishi Colt CZC (2006–2009)
- Nissan Micra C+C (2005–2010)
- Nissan Silvia Varietta (2000)
- Opel Astra TwinTop (2007–2010)
- Opel Tigra TwinTop (2004–2009)
- Peugeot 206 CC (2001-2007)
- Peugeot 207 CC (2007-2015)
- Peugeot 307 CC (2003-2008)
- Peugeot 308 CC (2009-2015)
- Pontiac G6 (2006–2009)
- Renault Mégane CC Mk.2 (2003-2009)
- Renault Mégane CC Mk.3 (2010-2016)
- Toyota Soarer Aerocabin (1989)
- Volkswagen Eos (2006–2015)
- Volvo C70 Mk.2 (2006-2013)

== Current cars ==
- Chevrolet Corvette (C8) (2020–present)
- Daihatsu Copen (LA400) (2014–present)
- Ferrari SF90 Spider (2019–present)
- Ferrari 296 GTS (2021–present)
- Maserati MC20 Cielo (2022–present)
- Mazda MX-5 RF (2016–present)
- McLaren 750S Spider (2023–present)
