= Richard Diamond, Private Detective (radio series) =

American radio detective series (1949–1953)

Richard Diamond, Private Detective is an American detective radio series that was broadcast from April 24, 1949, to September 20, 1953, first on NBC, then on ABC, and finally on CBS.

== Background ==
Contrary to rumors that NBC would program "a giant give-away show" against Jack Benny's program, the network announced a new series, Richard Diamond, Private Detective, for the 7 p.m. Eastern Time slot on Sundays, to begin April 24, 1949. Dick Powell was the star. It replaced Horace Heidt's Original Youth Opportunity Program. Advance publicity said that the program would be like Powell's previous Rogue's Gallery detective series. Blake Edwards was the creator.

== Overview ==
Richard Diamond established his own detective agency in New York City after having served in the OSS during World War II and having been a policeman in New York. He was "an operative with a keen, sardonic sense of humor" who "tangles frequently with underworld inhabitants". Hazards that Diamond encountered during the program's first season included being cut, drugged, gassed, hit with brass knuckles, hit with crockery, poisoned, strangled, thrown overboard, and nearly blown up. While the series was on NBC, Diamond sang a song at the end of each episode. When it moved to ABC with a new sponsor, they issued guidelines that called for "more blood and thunder and no singing".

=== Cast ===
In addition to Powell in the title role, Ed Begley initially portrayed Walter Levinson, a police lieutenant and Diamond's friend. Arthur Q. Bryan replaced Begley in later episodes. Helen Asher, "a great admirer of the private detective's daring and enterprise", was played by Virginia Gregg and Frances Robinson. Wilms Herbert had dual roles as police sergeant Otis and Francis, Asher's butler.

== Genre ==
Richard Diamond, Private Detective was one of several concurrent radio programs that featured private detectives. They included The Adventures of Sam Spade, The Fat Man, and Pat Novak, for Hire. The Richard Diamond series portrayed a more harmonious relationship between the detective and police than the others did. Scenarios on Richard Diamond did not show police as inept and pushing the detective around; instead they often worked with him. Like Novak and Spade, Diamond was often beaten up. Unlike them, he was not pursued by a different woman in each episode. Diamond was in a steady relationship with one woman, about whom he said, "She's got everything — looks, money, everything. But she always wants to get married."

== Broadcast history ==
=== NBC ===
Richard Diamond, Private Detective initially was sustaining. In mid-December 1949, NBC made what the trade publication Billboard called "a highly unususal proposition" to the Helbros Watch Company regarding partial sponsorship of Diamond. The proposal was that Helbros would sponsor alternate 13-week runs of the show. NBC would try to sell sponsorships for the remaining 13-week spans; otherwise they would be sustaining. As part of the proposal, NBC promised to spend at least $100,000 to promote the time slot, in which the competition included Mutual's "potent show, The Shadow". The program was sold to Helbros with plans for 5 p.m. Sunday broadcasts to begin in early March 1950. A lawsuit arose later, resulting from a change in sponsors. The advertising agency Dorland, Incorporated, sued NBC in New York Supreme Court for $29,890, charging breach of contract. The suit said that Dorland had a deal with Helbros for a $10,200-per-week sponsorship, but publicity for the show increased its value such that NBC sold it to Rexall Drug for $5,000 more than that. Rexall's sponsorship began with the April 5, 1950, episode.

From its first NBC episode on April 24, 1949, to its last on December 6, 1950, the half-hour program occupied a variety of time slots on Sundays, Wednesdays, and Saturdays.

=== ABC ===
Richard Diamond moved to ABC effective January 5, 1951, with "The Nathan Beeker Case" as the first episode on that network. It was broadcast on Fridays from 8 to 8:30 p.m. E. T. through June 29, 1951. The sponsor was the R. J. Reynolds Tobacco Company, promoting Camel cigarettes. After a summer hiatus, broadcasts resumed on October 5, 1951, in the same time slot with Rexall as the sponsor. That run ended on June 27, 1952.

=== CBS ===
Richard Diamond was broadcast on CBS from May 31, 1953, to September 20, 1953, as the summer replacement for Amos 'n' Andy. The episodes were reruns of earlier broadcasts with Rexall sponsoring the series.

== Production ==
The program originated from Hollywood. By December 1949 it was broadcast using a combination of recordings and live performances. Personnel at NBC developed a technique that had dialog of each episode recorded prior to the broadcast time. When an episode went on the air, engineers played the recording, and musicians in the studio played music at appropriate times. The hybrid approach provided flexibility for the show's actors while it saved the network money because musicians were paid "regular live-airing rates". If the entire program had been recorded, musicians would have been paid higher fees that were required for transcriptions.

Producers included Don Sharpe and Jaime del Valle; directors included William P. Rousseau, del Valle, and Edwards. Writers included Edwards and Harvey Easton. The theme song was "Leave It to Love" by Henry Russell. Bill Forman was the announcer.
