= Ford Fairlane 500 Skyliner =

Convertible with retractable hardtop, manufactured by Ford

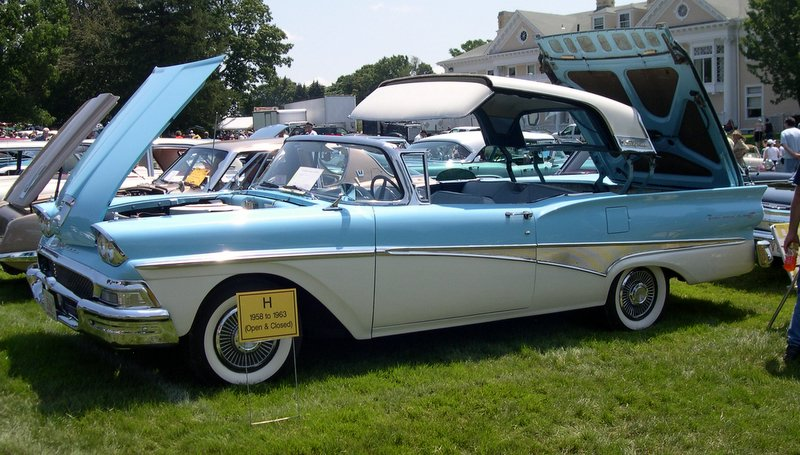

Overview
- Manufacturer: Ford
- Also called: Ford Galaxie (500) Skyliner; Ford Retractable
- Production: 1957–1959; 48,394 produced

Body and chassis
- Class: Full-size car
- Body style: 2-door retractable hardtop

Dimensions
- Wheelbase: 118 in (2997.2 mm)
- Length: 210.8 in (5354.32 mm)
- Height: 56.3 in (1430.02 mm)

Chronology
- Predecessor: Ford Fairlane Crown Victoria Skyliner

See also Ford Crestline Skyliner for the 1954 Ford and Ford Fairlane Crown Victoria Skyliner for the 1955–1956 Ford Fairlane Crown Victoria, both with an acrylic glass roof panel.

The Ford Fairlane 500 Skyliner is a two-door full-size retractable hardtop convertible, manufactured and marketed by Ford Motor Company for model years 1957–1959. However, early into the 1959 model year, its name was expanded to Fairlane 500 Galaxie Skyliner. The retracting roof system was marketed as the Hide-Away Hardtop, and was exclusively sold on this Ford-branded model, for three model years.

Ford's 1957 Skyliner was the world's first retracting hardtop convertible to be truly mass-produced by a car company from the factory, coming close to 50,000 sales. Earlier, French car-maker Peugeot had offered several such models in the 1930s, with the help of a coachbuilding company, which sold only in very limited numbers. It also marked the first time the hard roof featured a folding (front) section, to retract and fit inside the car's trunk.

== Naming and marketing ==
Ford first used the Skyliner name in 1954, on the two-door hardtop Ford Crestline Skyliner, and on the 1955 and 1956 Fairlane Crown Victoria Skyliner coupes. These models feature a clear acrylic glass roof panel over the front seats.

For 1957–1959, Ford brought the Fairlane 500 Skyliner, featuring a powered, retracting and folding hardtop roof. For the model year 1959, the name was changed to Ford Fairlane 500 Galaxie Skyliner, shortly after production began (also illustrated as such in the brochure but described only as "Galaxy" in the related text). The retractable roof mechanism, marketed as the "Hide-Away Hardtop", was unique to Ford-branded products, and was not offered on any Continental, Lincoln, Mercury, or Edsel branded vehicles.

== Design ==
Offering the Skyliner Retractable in Ford's Fairlane (500) range, Ford was only the second car-maker in history to produce retractable hardtops in series (following the 1930s Georges Paulin designed Peugeot 401, 402, and 601 "Eclipse Decapotable" models, converted by Carrosserie Pourtout coachbuilders); and the world's first to reach four- and five-digit mass-production numbers. Ford's design was also the first series produced coupé convertible featuring a roof using two segments, and during its production run, the Skyliner was the only hardtop convertible available.

The Skyliner's retractable top operated via a complex mechanism that folded the front of the roof and retracted it under the rear decklid. Instead of the typical hydraulic mechanisms, the Skyliner top used seven reversible electric motors (six for 1959 models), four lift jacks, a series of relays, ten limit switches, ten solenoids, four locking mechanisms for the roof and two locking mechanisms for the trunk lid, and 610 ft (185.9 m) of wiring. The top largely consumed available trunk space, limiting the car's sales, though the mechanism operated reliably. Production totaled 20,766 units in 1957, declining to 14,713 in 1958 and to 12,915 in 1959. An electric clock was standard. Fuel consumption was around 14 mpg_{‑US} (17 L/100 km; 17 mpg_{‑imp}) overall. The fuel tank was placed vertically in back of the rear seat, offering increased safety in a rear collision.

The wheelbase of the Skyliner was 118 in (3,000 mm) and the overall length was 210.8 in (5,350 mm).

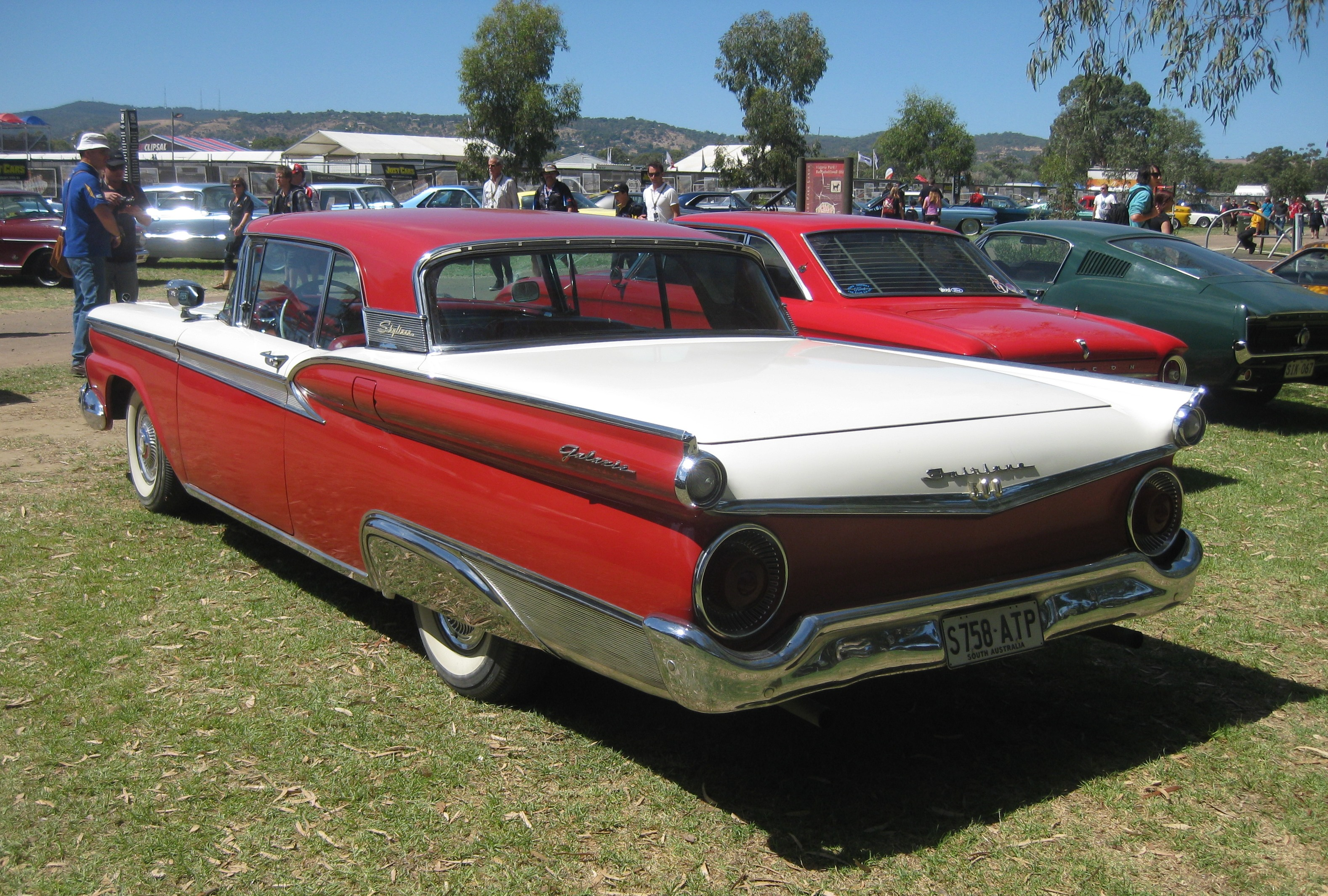
1959 Ford Galaxie Skyliner with both the Galaxie and Fairlane 500 badges

During the 1959 model year, Ford added the new top-of-the-line Galaxie series to its full-size lineup, and the Skyliner model became part of that series. Although the 1959 Galaxie was designated as a separate series, Galaxies carried both "Fairlane 500" and "Galaxie" badging, on the rear and sides respectively. It came with the standard 292 cu in (4.8 L) 2-barrel 200 hp (149 kW; 203 PS) V8 engine.

Requiring a shorter roof and longer trunk, the retractable roof concept was originally intended for Ford's Continental brand. The mechanism's complexity would have required an even more expensive marketing position for a Continental, and when Ford projected losses for this route, the company re-conceived the model and restyled it from the waist down—projecting it would attract more buyers under the Ford brand. Though prescient, the concept ultimately attracted more attention than sales; it was expensive, thought to be unreliable, and consumed almost all trunk space when retracted. The listed retail price was US$2,942 ($29,300 in 2025 dollars) with several items available optionally like power windows, power-adjustable front seat, power steering, power brakes, heater and windshield defroster.

Although the actual mechanicals differed, the Skyliner's retractable roof design was later adopted for the Lincoln Continental fabric convertibles of 1961–1967.

== Engines and transmissions ==
The following engines, all V8s, were available on the Fairlane 500 Skyliner.

Size	Horsepower	Model Years
272 cu in (4.5 L)	190 hp (140 kW)	1957
292 cu in (4.8 L)	200 hp (150 kW); 205 hp (153 kW); 212 hp (158 kW)	1957, 1958 & 1959
312 cu in (5.1 L)	245 hp (183 kW)	1957
332 cu in (5.4 L)	225 hp (168 kW); 240 hp (180 kW); 265 hp (198 kW)	1958 & 1959
352 cu in (5.8 L)	300 hp (220 kW)	1958 & 1959

Two manual transmissions, a three-speed and three-speed overdrive, and a three-speed Ford-O-Matic automatic transmission. Starting in 1958, Cruise-O-Matic was added, which provided a second "drive" range ("D2"), allowing for an intermediate gear start.

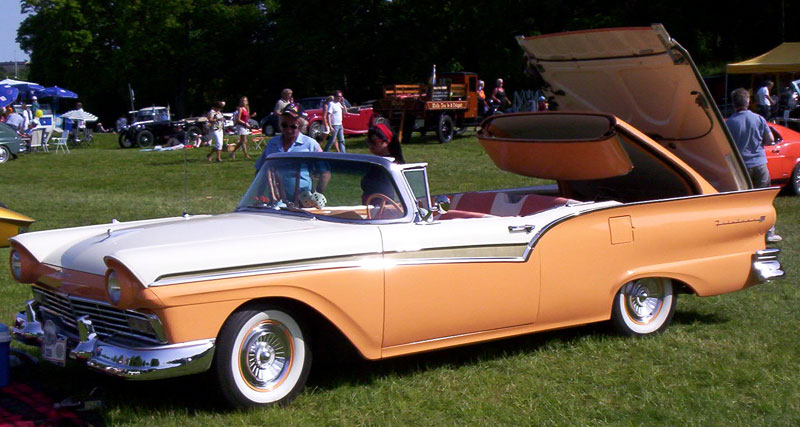
1957 Ford Fairlane 500 Skyliner

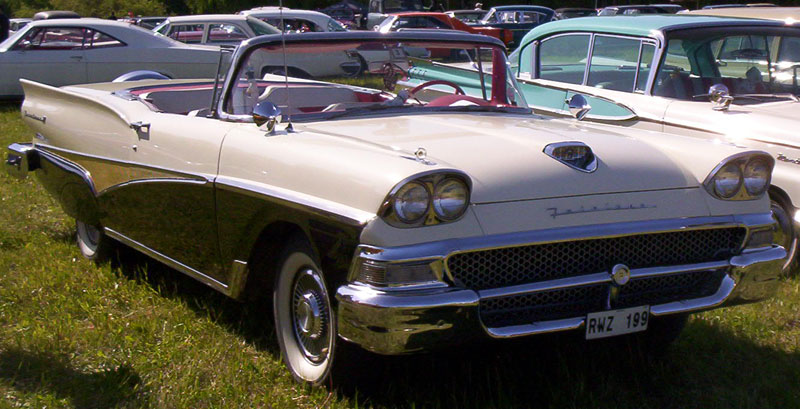
1958 Ford Fairlane 500 Skyliner

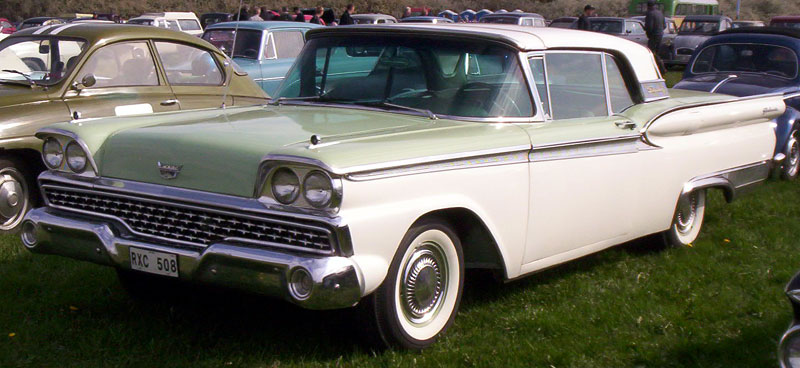
1959 Ford Fairlane 500 Skyliner

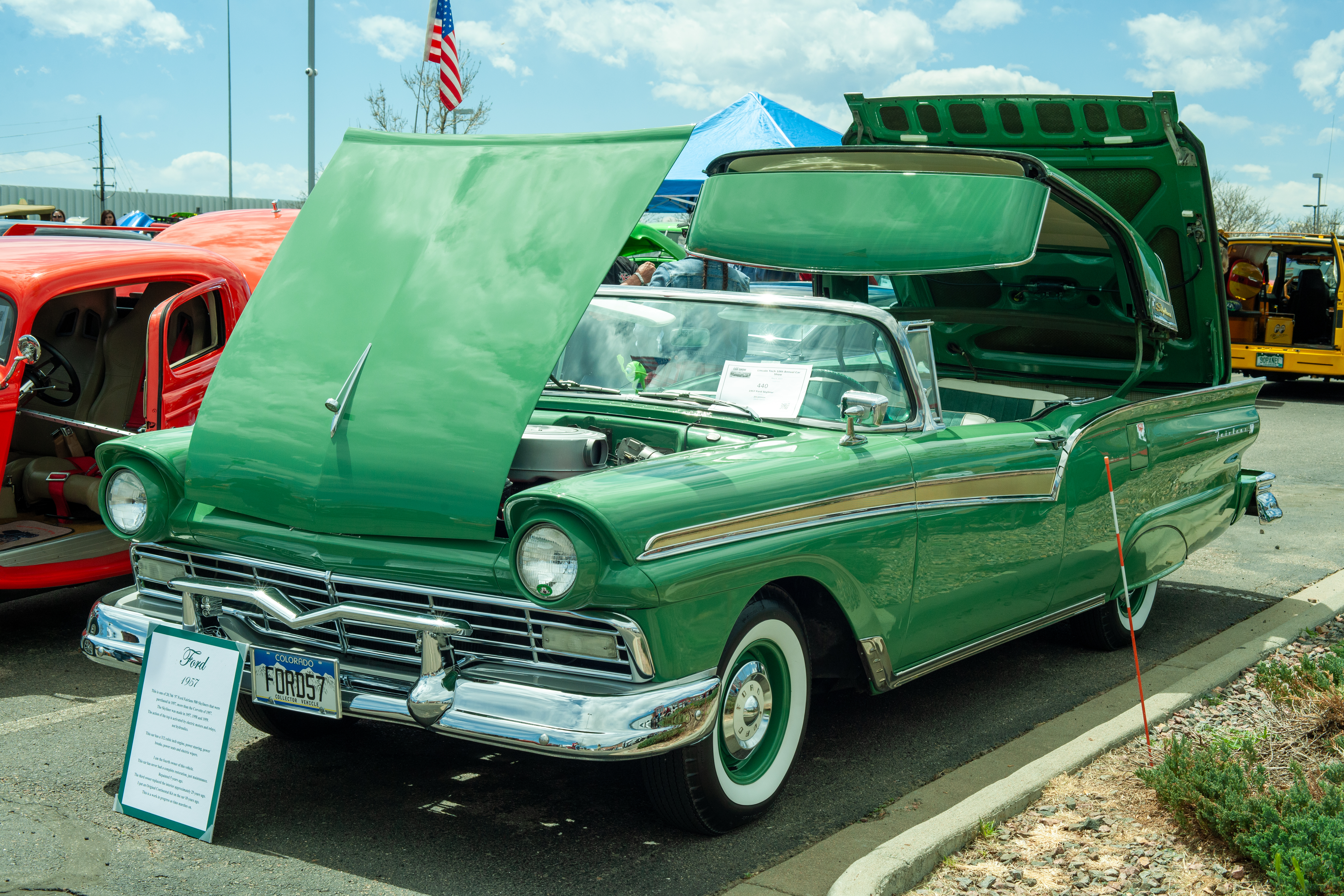
1957 Ford Fairlane 500 Skyliner in Cumberland Green

== Bibliography ==
- Holmes, Mark (2007). Ultimate Convertibles: Roofless Beauty. London: Kandour. pp. 74–75. ISBN 978-1-905741-62-5.
