= Dick Powell =

American actor (1904–1963)

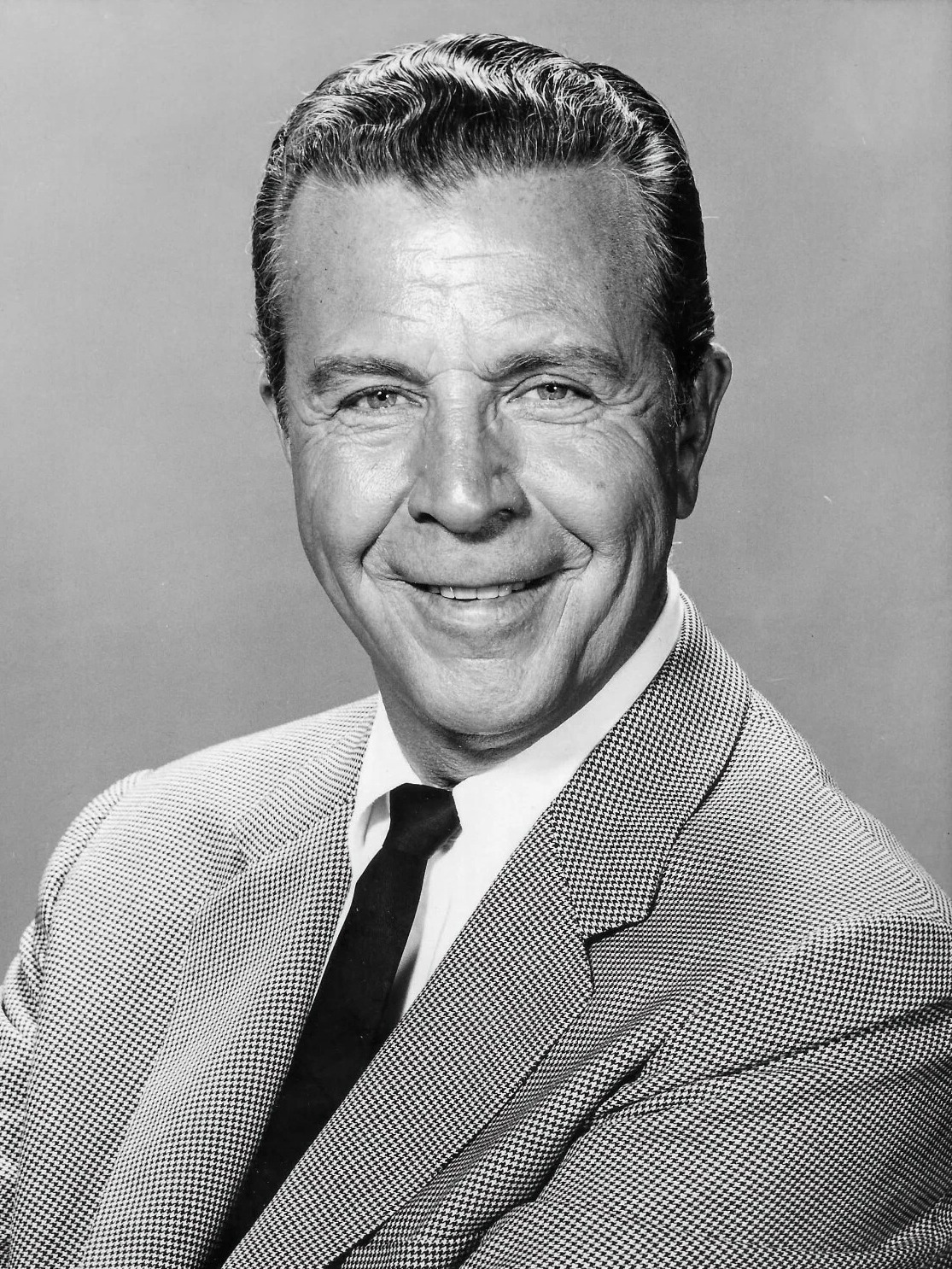
- Powell in 1961
- Born: Richard Ewing Powell; November 14, 1904; Mountain View, Arkansas, U.S.
- Died: January 2, 1963 (aged 58); Los Angeles, California, U.S.
- Resting place: Forest Lawn Memorial Park
- Occupations: Actor; singer; musician; producer; director; studio head
- Years active: 1930–1963
- Spouses: Mildred Maund (m. 1925; div. 1932) Joan Blondell (m. 1936; div. 1944) June Allyson (m. 1945)
- Children: 4

Signature
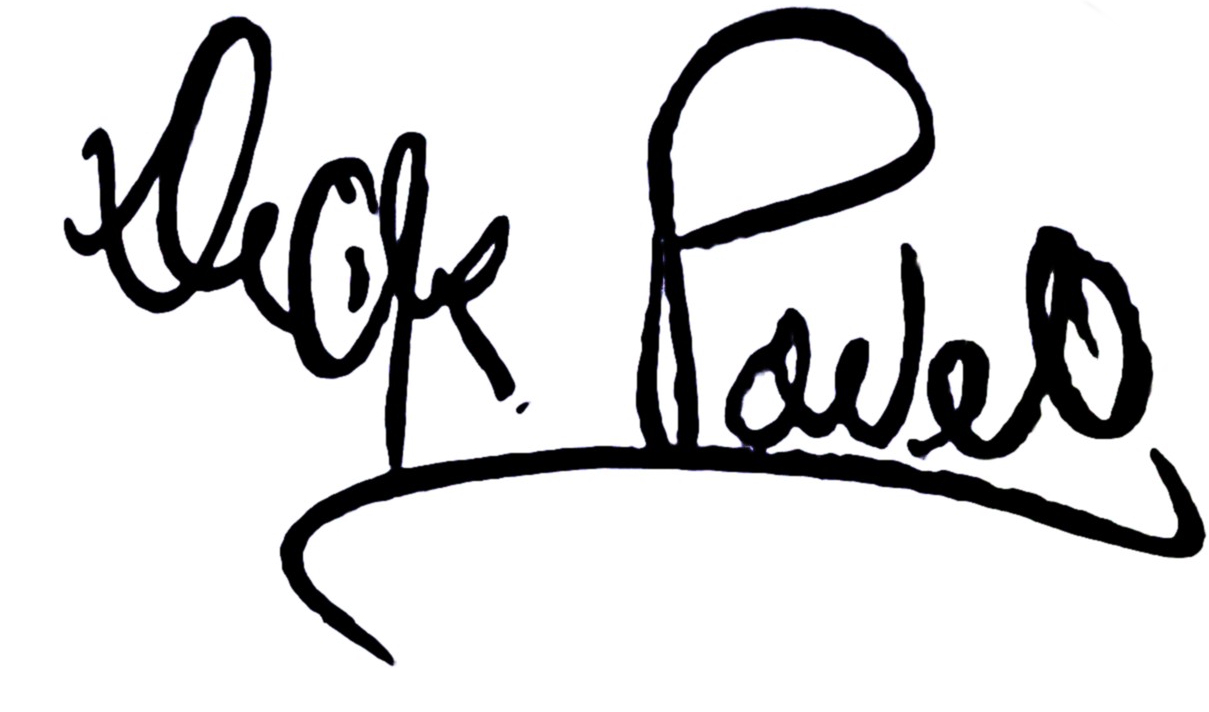

Richard Ewing Powell (November 14, 1904 – January 2, 1963) was an American actor, singer, musician, producer, director, and studio head. Though he came to stardom as a musical comedy performer, he showed versatility and successfully transformed into a hardboiled leading man, starring in projects of a more dramatic nature. He was the first actor to portray private detective Philip Marlowe on screen.

== Early life ==
Powell was born the middle of three sons of Ewing Powell and mother Sally Rowena in Mountain View, Arkansas.

He married Mildred Maund, a model, but she found being married to an entertainer not to her liking. After a final trip to Cuba together, Mildred moved to Hemphill, Texas, and the couple divorced in 1932. Later, Powell joined the Charlie Davis Orchestra, based in Indianapolis. He recorded a number of records with Davis and on his own for the Vocalion label in the late 1920s.

== Stardom ==
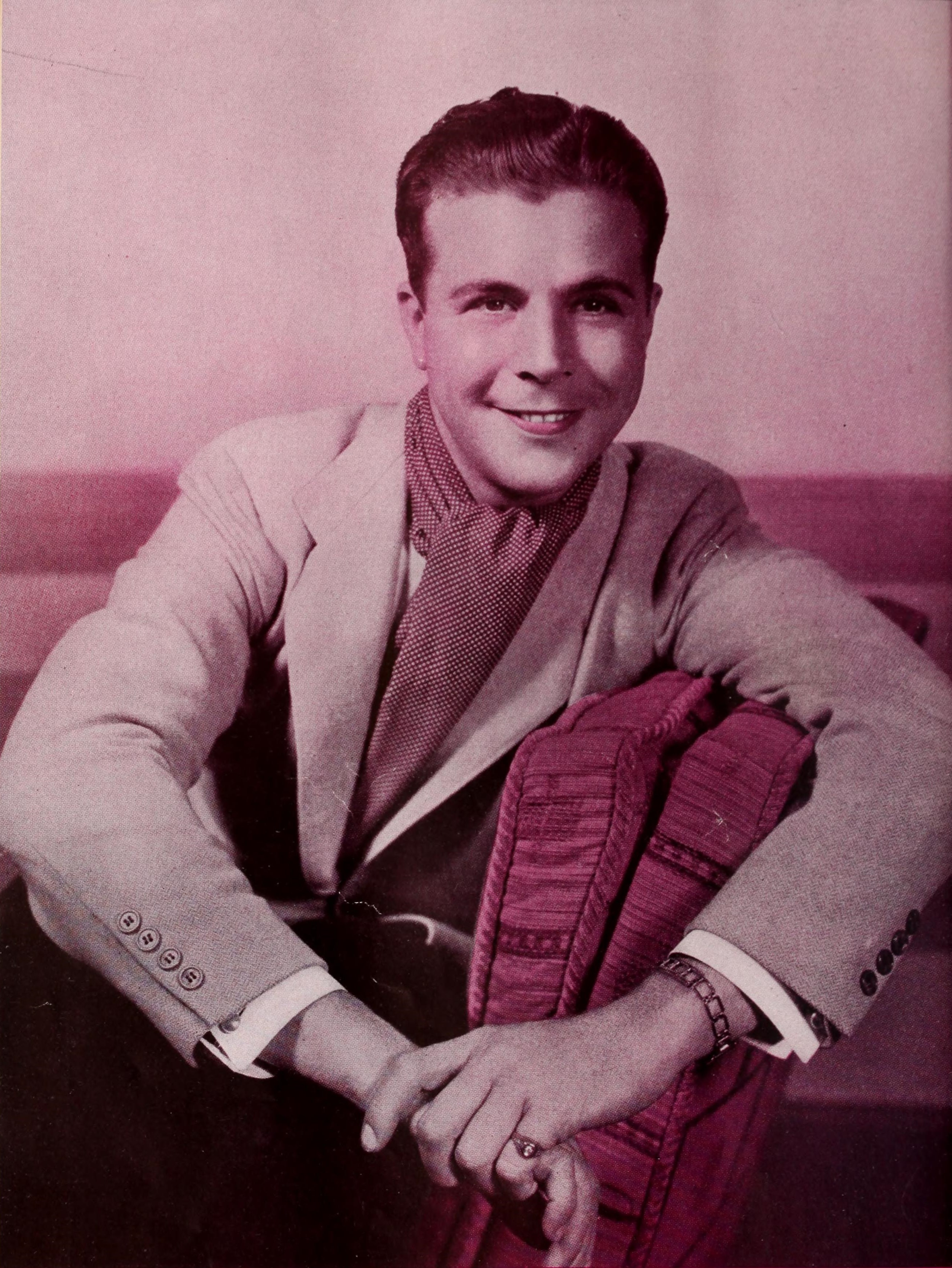
Dick Powell in 1934

Powell moved to Pittsburgh, where he found great local success as the master of ceremonies at the Enright Theater and the Stanley Theater.

=== Warner Bros. ===
In April 1930, Warner Bros. bought Brunswick Records, which at that time owned Vocalion. Warner Bros. was sufficiently impressed by Powell's singing and stage presence to offer him a film contract in 1932. He made his film debut as a singing bandleader in Blessed Event.

He was borrowed by Fox Film to support Will Rogers in Too Busy to Work (1932). He was a boyish crooner, the sort of role in which he specialized for the next few years. Back at Warner Bros., he supported George Arliss in The King's Vacation, then was in 42nd Street (both 1933), playing the love interest for Ruby Keeler. The film was a massive hit.

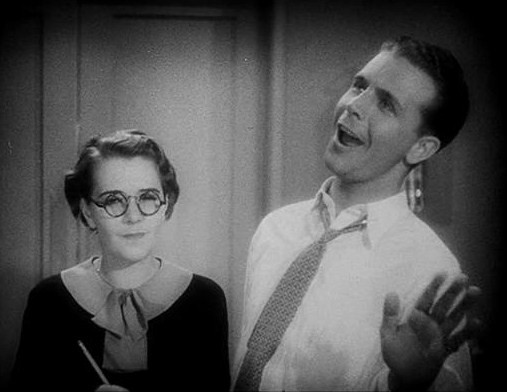
Ruby Keeler and Powell in Footlight Parade (1933)

Warner Bros. (WB) got him basically to repeat the role in Gold Diggers of 1933, another big success. So too was Footlight Parade (also 1933), with Keeler, James Cagney and Joan Blondell.

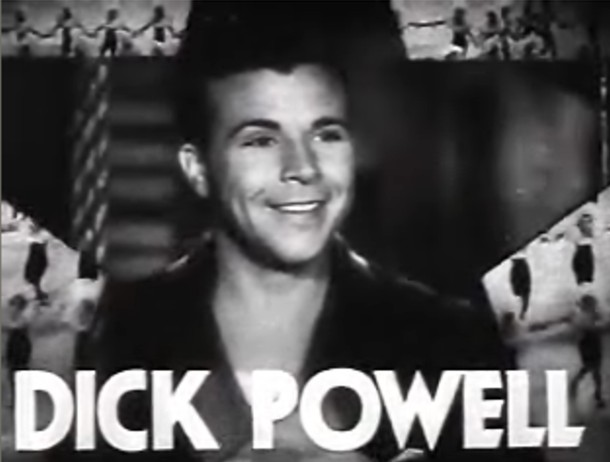
Dick Powell in a trailer for Dames (1934)

Powell was upped to star for College Coach (1933), then went back to more ensemble pieces including 42nd Street, Convention City (both 1933), Wonder Bar, Twenty Million Sweethearts, and Dames (all 1934). Happiness Ahead was more of a star vehicle for Powell, as was Flirtation Walk (both 1934). He was top-billed in Gold Diggers of 1935, with Gloria Stuart, and Broadway Gondolier, with Joan Blondell (both 1935). He supported Marion Davies in Page Miss Glory (1935), made for Cosmopolitan Pictures, a production company financed by Davies' lover William Randolph Hearst, who released through WB.

WB gave him a change of pace, casting him as Lysander in A Midsummer Night's Dream (1935). More typical was Shipmates Forever (1935) with Keeler. 20th Century Fox borrowed him for Thanks a Million (1935); back at WB, he did Colleen (1936) with Keeler and Blondell. Powell was reunited with Marion Davies in another for Cosmopolitan, Hearts Divided (1936), playing Napoleon's brother.

He made several films with Blondell, his second wife, including Footlight Parade (1933), Broadway Gondolier (1935), Stage Struck (1936) and Gold Diggers of 1937. 20th Century Fox then borrowed him again for On the Avenue (1937).

Back at WB, he appeared in The Singing Marine and Varsity Show (both 1937), Hollywood Hotel, Cowboy from Brooklyn, Hard to Get, Going Places (all 1938), and Naughty but Nice (1939). Fed up with the repetitive nature of these roles, Powell left WB and went to work for Paramount Pictures.

=== Paramount ===
At Paramount, Blondell and Powell were cast together again in the drama I Want a Divorce (1940). Then Powell got a chance to appear in another non-musical, Christmas in July (1940), a screwball comedy which was the second feature directed by Preston Sturges.

Universal borrowed him to support Abbott and Costello in In the Navy (1941), one of the most popular films of 1941. At Paramount he had a cameo in Star Spangled Rhythm and co-starred with Mary Martin in Happy Go Lucky (both 1943). He supported Dorothy Lamour in Riding High (1943).

In 1944, he was in a fantasy comedy directed by René Clair, It Happened Tomorrow, then went over to MGM to appear opposite Lucille Ball in Meet the People, which was a box-office flop.

During this period, Powell starred in the musical Campana Serenade, which was broadcast on NBC radio (1942–1943) and CBS radio (1943–1944).

== "Tough guy" ==
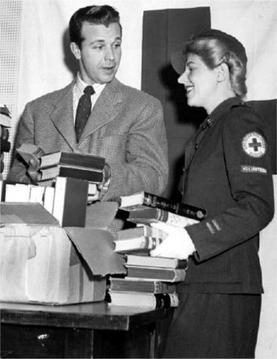
Dick Powell and Inez Asher

By 1944, Powell felt he was too old to play romantic leading men anymore, so he lobbied to play the lead in Double Indemnity. He lost out to Fred MacMurray, another Hollywood nice guy.

Powell's career changed dramatically when he was cast in the first of a series of films noir, as private detective Philip Marlowe in Murder, My Sweet (1944), directed by Edward Dmytryk at RKO. The film was a big hit, and Powell had successfully reinvented himself as a dramatic actor. He was the first actor to play Marlowe – by name – in motion pictures. In 1945, Dmytryk and Powell teamed up again to make the film Cornered, a post-World War II thriller that helped define the film-noir style.

For Columbia, he played a casino owner in Johnny O'Clock (1947) and made To the Ends of the Earth (1948). Also in 1948, he stepped out of the brutish type when he starred in Pitfall, a film noir in which a bored insurance-company worker falls for an innocent but dangerous woman, played by Lizabeth Scott. He broadened his range appearing in a Western, Station West (1948) and a French Foreign Legion tale, Rogues' Regiment (1949). He was a Mountie in Mrs. Mike (1950).

== Radio ==
Powell starred in the summer-replacement series Rogue's Gallery. in 1945, 1946, and 1947. He played Richard Rogue, private detective.

Private-detective and mystery stories were popular in the late 1940s, stemming from the success of Jack Webb's Dragnet, which began in 1947. In 1948 Powell starred in the pilot episode of Yours Truly, Johnny Dollar for CBS Radio. Dollar was an insurance investigator who was fond of tipping bellboys, waiters, and informants with silver-dollar coins. Powell was successful in the role but decided against joining the series, which ran from 1949 to 1962. Instead, he accepted the leading role in NBC's radio series Richard Diamond, Private Detective. His character in the 30-minute weekly show was a likable private detective with a quick wit. Many episodes ended with Detective Diamond singing a little song to his date, showcasing Powell's vocal abilities. (NBC's radio commercials promoted Powell as "the romantic tough guy.") Many of the episodes were written by Blake Edwards. The radio series ran from 1949 to 1953. When Richard Diamond came to television in 1957, the lead role was portrayed by David Janssen, who did no singing in the series.

== Return to films ==
Powell took a break from tough-guy roles in The Reformer and the Redhead (1950), opposite his wife, June Allyson. Then he was back to tougher movies: Right Cross (1950), a boxing film with Allyson; Cry Danger (1951), as an ex-convict; The Tall Target (1951), at MGM directed by Anthony Mann, playing a detective who tries to prevent the assassination of president-elect in 1861 Abraham Lincoln.

He returned to comedy with You Never Can Tell (1951). Powell had a supporting role in MGM's popular melodrama The Bad and the Beautiful (1952). His final film performance was in a romantic comedy Susan Slept Here (1954) for director Frank Tashlin.

Even when he appeared in lighter fare such as The Reformer and the Redhead and Susan Slept Here, he never sang in his later roles. The latter, his final onscreen appearance in a feature film, did include a dance number with co-star Debbie Reynolds.

== Director ==
By this stage, Powell had turned director. His feature debut was Split Second (1953) at RKO Pictures. He followed it with The Conqueror (1956), coproduced by Howard Hughes and starring John Wayne as Genghis Khan. The exterior scenes were filmed in St. George, Utah, downwind of U.S. above-ground atomic tests. The cast and crew totaled 220, and of that number, 91 had developed some form of cancer by 1981, and 46 had died of cancer by then, including Powell and Wayne.

Powell directed Allyson opposite Jack Lemmon in You Can't Run Away from It (1956). Powell then made two war films at Fox with Robert Mitchum, The Enemy Below (1957) and The Hunters (1958).

== Television ==
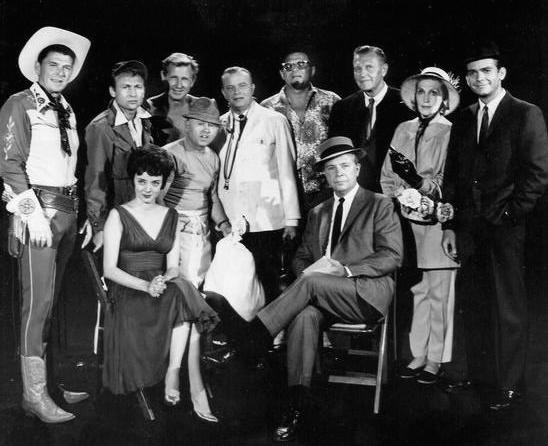
Guest stars for the premiere episode of The Dick Powell Show, "Who Killed Julie Greer?" Standing, from left: Ronald Reagan, Nick Adams, Lloyd Bridges, Mickey Rooney, Edgar Bergen, Jack Carson, Ralph Bellamy, Kay Thompson, and Dean Jones, seated, from left, Carolyn Jones and Dick Powell.

In the 1950s, Powell was one of the founders of Four Star Television, with Charles Boyer, David Niven, and Ida Lupino. He appeared in and supervised several shows for that company. Shortly before his death, Powell sang on camera for the final time in a guest-star appearance on Four Star's Ensign O'Toole, singing "The Song of the Marines", which he first sang in his 1937 film The Singing Marine. He hosted and occasionally starred in his Dick Powell's Zane Grey Theater on CBS from 1956 to 1961, and his final anthology series, The Dick Powell Show on NBC from 1961 through 1963; after his death, the series continued through the end of its second season (as The Dick Powell Theater), with guest hosts.

== Personal life ==
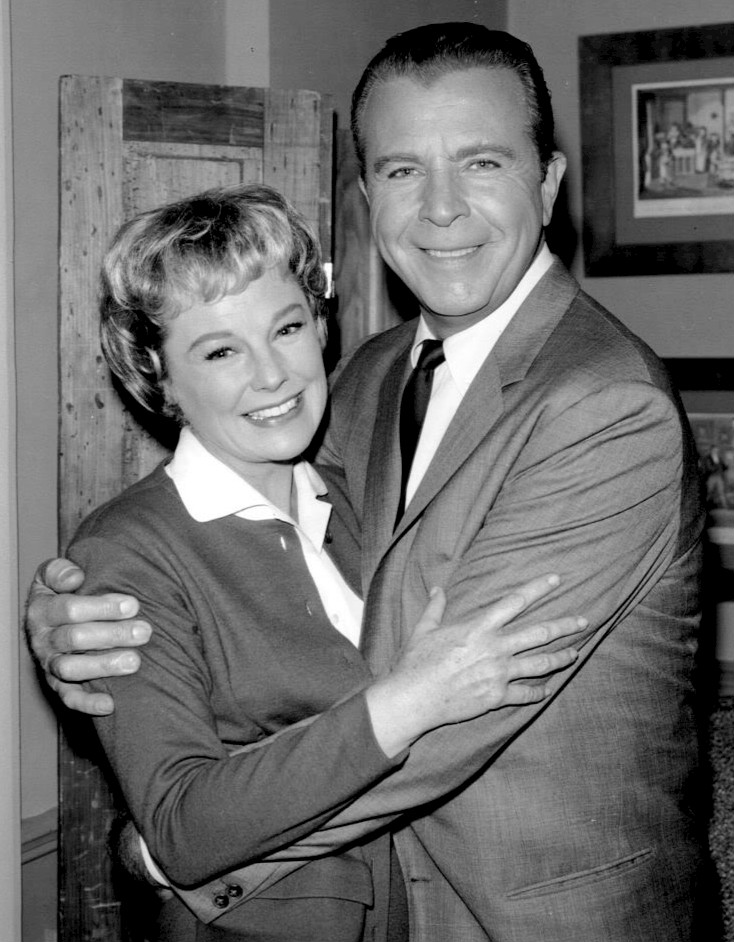
June Allyson and Dick Powell in 1962

Powell was the son of Ewing Powell and Sallie Rowena Thompson.

He married three times:

- Mildred Evelyn Maund (b. 1906, d. 1967). The couple married in 1925, and appear on the 1930 census in Pittsburgh, Pennsylvania, where Powell was working in a theater, and on a 1931 passenger list for the SS Oriente, returning from Havana, Cuba. They divorced in 1932, although Mildred retained her married name.
- Joan Blondell (married September 19, 1936, divorced 1944). He adopted her son from a previous marriage, Norman Powell, who later became a television producer; the couple also had one child together, Ellen Powell.
- June Allyson (August 19, 1945, until his death, January 2, 1963), with whom he had two children, Pamela (adopted) and Richard Powell, Jr.

Powell's ranch-style house was used for exterior filming on the ABC TV series, Hart to Hart. The estate, known as Amber Hills, was on 48 acres (19 hectares) in the Mandeville Canyon section of Brentwood, Los Angeles.

Powell enjoyed general aviation as a private pilot. He and Farouk of Egypt were the only two known buyers of the Gaylord Gladiator automobile.

== Illness and death ==
On September 27, 1962, Powell acknowledged rumors that he was undergoing treatment for cancer. The disease was originally diagnosed as an allergy, with Powell first experiencing symptoms while traveling east to promote his program. Upon his return to California, Powell's personal physician conducted tests and found malignant tumors on his neck and chest.

The marker on Dick Powell's niche in Forest Lawn Memorial Park, Glendale, California, incorrectly identifies his year of death as 1962. Powell died at the age of 58 on January 2, 1963.

It is speculated Powell developed cancer as a result of his participation in the film The Conqueror, which was filmed at St. George, Utah, near a site used by the U.S. military for nuclear testing. About a third of the actors who participated in the film developed cancer, including Powell, who directed the film, John Wayne, Susan Hayward, Agnes Moorehead and Pedro Armendáriz. However, in a 2001 interview with Larry King, Powell's widow June Allyson stated that the cause of death was lung cancer due to his chain smoking.

During the 15th Primetime Emmy Awards on May 26, 1963, the Television Academy presented a posthumous Television Academy Trustee Award to Dick Powell for his contributions to the industry. The award was accepted by two of his former partners in Four Star Television, Charles Boyer and David Niven.

Dick Powell has a star on the Hollywood Walk of Fame at 6915 Hollywood Boulevard.

== Filmography ==
=== As actor ===
==== Features ====
Year	Film	Role	Director	Notes
1932	Blessed Event	Bunny Harmon	Roy Del Ruth	
1932	Big City Blues	Radio Announcer	Mervyn LeRoy	Uncredited; voice only
1932	Too Busy to Work	Dan Hardy	John G. Blystone	
1933	The King's Vacation	John Kent	John G. Adolfi	
1933	42nd Street	Billy Lawler	Lloyd Bacon	
1933	Gold Diggers of 1933	Brad Roberts	Busby Berkeley	
1933	Footlight Parade	Scotty Blair	Busby Berkeley	
1933	College Coach	Phil Saegent	William A. Wellman	
1933	Convention City	Jerry Ford	Archie Mayo	Lost film
1934	Wonder Bar	Tommy	Busby Berkeley	
1934	Twenty Million Sweethearts	Buddy Clayton	Ray Enright	
1934	Dames	Jimmy Higgens	Busby Berkeley	
1934	Happiness Ahead	Bob Lane	Mervyn LeRoy	
1934	Flirtation Walk	Dick "Canary" Dorcy	Frank Borzage	
1935	Gold Diggers of 1935	Dick Curtis	Busby Berkeley	
1935	Broadway Gondolier	Richard "Dick" Purcell	Lloyd Bacon	
1935	Broadway Hostess	Quartet member	Frank McDonald	Uncredited
1935	Page Miss Glory	Bingo Nelson	Mervyn LeRoy	
1935	A Midsummer Night's Dream	Lysander	Max Reinhardt & William Dieterle	
1935	Shipmates Forever	Dick Melville III	Frank Borzage	
1935	Thanks a Million	Eric Land	Roy Del Ruth	
1936	Colleen	Donald Ames	Alfred E. Green	
1936	Hearts Divided	Capt. Jerome Bonaparte	Frank Borzage	
1936	Stage Struck	George Randall	Busby Berkeley	
1936	Gold Diggers of 1937	Rosmer Peak	Lloyd Bacon	
1937	On the Avenue	Gary Blake	William Seiter	
1937	The Singing Marine	Bob Brent	Busby Berkeley	
1937	Varsity Show	Charles "Chuck" daly	William Keighley	
1937	Hollywood Hotel	Ronnie Bowers	Busby Berkeley	
1938	Cowboy from Brooklyn	Ellyn Jordan / Wyoming Steve Gibson	Lloyd Bacon	
1938	Hard to Get	Bill Davis	Ray Enright	
1938	Going Places	Peter Mason	Ray Enright	
1939	Naughty but Nice	Prof. Donald Hardwick	Ray Enright	
1940	I Want a Divorce	Alan MacNally	Ralph Murphy	
1940	Christmas in July	Jimmy McDonald	Preston Sturges	
1941	Model Wife	Fred Chambers	Leigh Jason	
1941	In the Navy	Thomas Halstead	Arthur Lubin	
1942	Star Spangled Rhythm	Himself	Paul Weatherwax	Segment: "Hit the Road to Dreamland"
1943	Happy Go Lucky	Pete Hamilton	Curtis Bernhardt	
1943	Riding High	Steve Baird	George Marshall	
1943	True to Life	Link Ferris	George Marshall	
1944	It Happened Tomorrow	Larry Stevens	René Clair	
1944	Meet the People	William "Swanee" Swanson	Charles Reisner	
1944	Murder, My Sweet	Philip Marlowe	Edward Dmytryk	released in the UK as Farewell, My Lovely
1945	Cornered	Laurence Gerard	Edward Dmytryk	
1947	Johnny O'Clock	Johnny O'Clock	Robert Rossen	
1948	To the Ends of the Earth	Commissioner Michael Barrows	Robert Stevenson	
1948	Pitfall	John Forbes	Andre de Toth	
1948	Station West	Haven	Sidney Lanfield	
1948	Rogues' Regiment	Whit Corbett	Robert Florey	
1949	Mrs. Mike	Sgt. Mike Flannigan	Louis King	
1950	The Reformer and the Redhead	Andrew Rockton Hale	Norman Panama & Melvin Frank	
1950	Right Cross	Rick Garvey	John Sturges	
1951	The Tall Target	John Kennedy	Anthony Mann	
1951	Cry Danger	Rocky Mulloy	Robert Parrish	
1951	You Never Can Tell	Rex Shepard	Lou Breslow	
1953	The Bad and the Beautiful	James Lee Bartlow	Vincente Minnelli	
1954	Susan Slept Here	Mark Christopher	Frank Tashlin	

==== Short subjects ====
- The Road Is Open Again (1933)
- Just Around the Corner (1933)
- Hollywood on Parade No. A-9 (1933)
- And She Learned About Dames (1934)
- Hollywood Newsreel (1934)
- A Dream Comes True (1935)
- Hollywood Hobbies (1939)

=== As director ===
- Split Second (1953)
- The Conqueror (1956)
- You Can't Run Away from It (1956)
- The Enemy Below (1957)
- The Hunters (1958)

== Radio appearances ==
Powell was the first actor to play private detective Philip Marlowe on radio, in 1945.

Lux Radio Theatre appearances:

Date	Episode	Cast
December 21, 1936	Gold Diggers	Joan Blondell, Dick Powell
May 19, 1941	Model Wife	Dick Powell, Joan Blondell
January 18, 1943	My Gal Sal	Mary Martin, Dick Powell
May 22, 1944	Springtime in the Rockies	Betty Grable, Dick Powell, Carmen Miranda
June 26, 1944	Christmas in July	Dick Powell, Linda Darnell
November 20, 1944	It Started with Eve	Charles Laughton, Dick Powell
June 11, 1945	Murder, My Sweet	Dick Powell, Claire Trevor
May 12, 1947	Johnny O'Clock	Dick Powell, Lee J. Cobb
November 8, 1948	Pitfall	Dick Powell, Jane Wyatt, Lizbeth Scott
May 23, 1949	To the Ends of the Earth	Dick Powell, Signa Hasso
April 24, 1950	Mrs. Mike	Dick Powell, Gene Tierney
June 25, 1951	The Reformer and the Redhead	Dick Powell, June Allyson
January 11, 1955	Island in the Sky	Dick Powell, Lamont Johnson
May 17, 1955	Little Boy Lost	Dick Powell, Gladys Holland

Year	Program	Episode/source
1945–1946	Rogue's Gallery	played detective Richard Rogue
1949–1953	Richard Diamond, Private Detective	played Richard Diamond (NBC radio theater production)
1948 (premiere episode only)	Yours Truly, Johnny Dollar	played insurance investigator Johnny Dollar
1952	Stars in the Air	The Bride Goes Wild

== Partial list of recordings ==
- "Is She My Girl Friend?" (1927-Vocalion 15647), the first commercially released record by Dick Powell. Although it was his first released record, it is not his first recording - "Time Will Tell" was his first recording, being for Gennett Records, however it was never pressed.
- "I Only Have Eyes for You" (1934) from the film Dames.
- "Roses in December" (1937) words and music by Herb Magidson, Ben Oakland and George Jessel. (The song first appeared in The Life of the Party.) ISWC: T-070127274-3
- "Over There"/"Captains of the Clouds" (1942–Decca 4174) Issued early in World War II, the A side brought back a patriotic song that had been popular in World War I. The B side came from a James Cagney film of the same name.
- "Susan Slept Here" (Jack Lawrence)/"Hold My Hand" (Richard Myers-Jack Lawrence), Bell Records 1048. Both songs were sung (not by Powell) in the film Susan Slept Here (1954).
