= Rogue =

A rogue is a person or entity that flouts accepted norms of behavior or strikes out on an independent and possibly destructive path.

Rogue, rogues, or going rogue may also refer to:

== Companies ==
- Rogue Ales, a microbrewery in Newport, Oregon
- Rogue Arts, a film production company
- Rogue Entertainment, a software company
- Rogue Films, a production company based in London
- Rogue Fitness, a manufacturer and distributor of strength and conditioning equipment
- Rogue Pictures, an American film production company
- Rogue (esports), an American esports organization

== Arts, entertainment and media ==
=== Comics ===
- Rogue (Marvel Comics), a Marvel comics character
- Rogues (comics), a villain team in the DC Comics universe
- Rogue Trooper, a fictional character from the science fiction strip of the same name

=== Film ===
- The Rogue, a 1918 American film starring Oliver Hardy
- The Rogues (film), a 1987 Italian comedy film ("I picari" in Italian)
- Rogue (2007 film), an Australian independent horror film
- Rogue (2017 film), an Indian bilingual action thriller
- Rogue (2020 film), an American action film starring Megan Fox

=== Television ===
==== Series ====
- Rogue (TV series), an American police drama series
- The Rogues (TV series), a 1964–1965 American series

==== Episodes ====
- "Rogue" (Doctor Who), 2024
- "Rogue" (The Gentle Touch), 1980
- "Rogue" (NCIS), 2016
- "Rogue" (The Professionals), 1978
- "Rogue" (Smallville), 2002
- "Going Rogue", from The Flash (2014 TV series)

=== Gaming ===
- Rogue (character class) in role-playing games
- Rogue (video game), a 1980 dungeon-crawling video game
- Assassin's Creed Rogue, a 2014 action-adventure video game
- "Going Rogue", an expansion pack for the City of Heroes online game

=== Literature ===
- Rogue (novel), by Danielle Steel, published in 2008
- The Rogue (novel), a 2011 novel by Trudi Canavan
- The Rogues, a series of Forgotten Realms novels
- Rogues (anthology), a 2014 short story collection edited by George R. R. Martin and Gardner Dozois
- Rogue, a 2001 Star Trek: Section 31 novel

=== Music ===
- Rogue (band), British soft rock band
- Rogue (Joel Hunt), music producer with Monstercat
- Rogue (Virgil Roger du Pont III), vocalist with the Crüxshadows
- "Rogue", a song on the album Duél by Jinjer
- "Rogue", a song on the album Silent Machine by Twelve Foot Ninja
- "Rogues", a song on the album Light Grenades by Incubus
- The Rogue's March, a derisive piece of music used e.g. for drumming out delinquent soldiers.

== Places ==
- Rogues, Gard, a town in southern France
- Rogue River (Michigan)
- Rogue River (Oregon)
- Rogue Valley, Oregon
  - Rogue Valley AVA, Oregon wine region within the Rogue Valley

== Science and technology ==
- Rogue planet, a planet-sized object not orbiting a parent star
- Rogue security software, malicious software that generates false security warnings
- Rogue wave, a large, unexpected ocean wave
- Moog Rogue, an analog synthesizer from the 1980s
- Nissan Rogue, a car produced by Nissan Motors from 2007
- A variant of the Rambler American, a car made by American Motors (AMC) in the 1960s
- A lone and often destructive elephant

== Other uses ==
- Rogue (magazine), a men's magazine
- Going Rogue, a 2009 memoir by Sarah Palin
- The Rogue: Searching for the Real Sarah Palin, a 2011 biography by Joe McGinniss
- An unlawful vagrant, especially under certain historic Vagrancy Acts in England

== See also ==
- Rogue state, a term for a nation acting outside international norms
- RogueArt, a French independent record label
- Roguing, in agriculture, the act of identifying and removing undesirable plants
- Lovable rogue, a fictional character archetype
