= Retractable hardtop =

Vehicle with a retracting solid roof

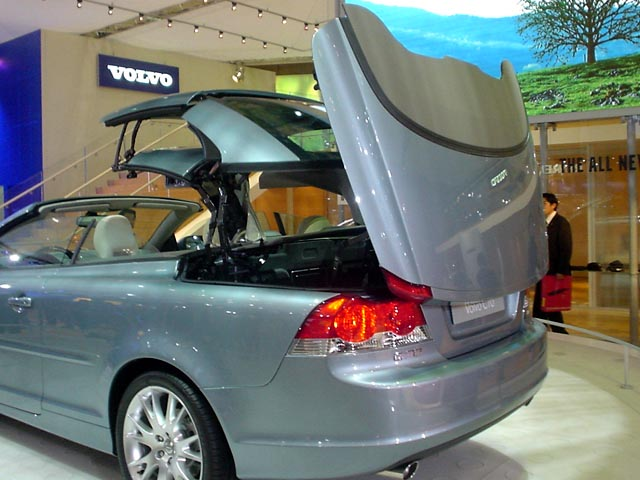
A Volvo C70 with retractable hardtop

A retractable hardtop — also known as "coupé convertible" or "coupé cabriolet" — is a car with an automatically operated, self-storing hardtop, as opposed to the folding textile-based roof used by traditional convertible cars.

Improved climate control and security benefits are traded against increased mechanical complexity, cost, weight, and often reduced luggage capacity.

A 2006 New York Times article suggested the retractable hardtop might herald the demise of the textile-roofed convertible, and a 2007 Wall Street Journal article suggested "more and more convertibles are eschewing soft cloth tops in favor of sophisticated folding metal roofs, making them practical in all climates, year-round."

== History ==
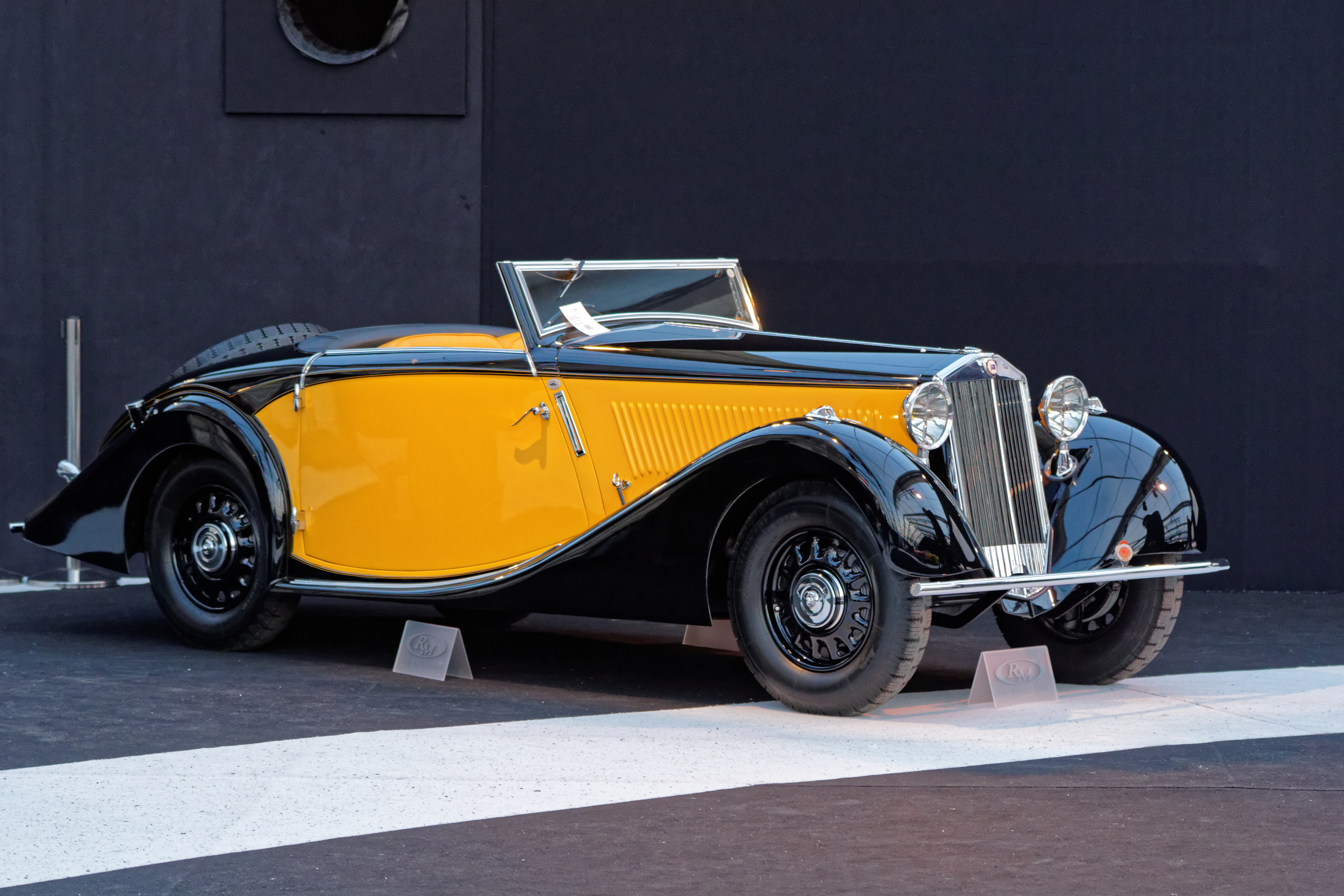
1934 Lancia Belna Eclipse

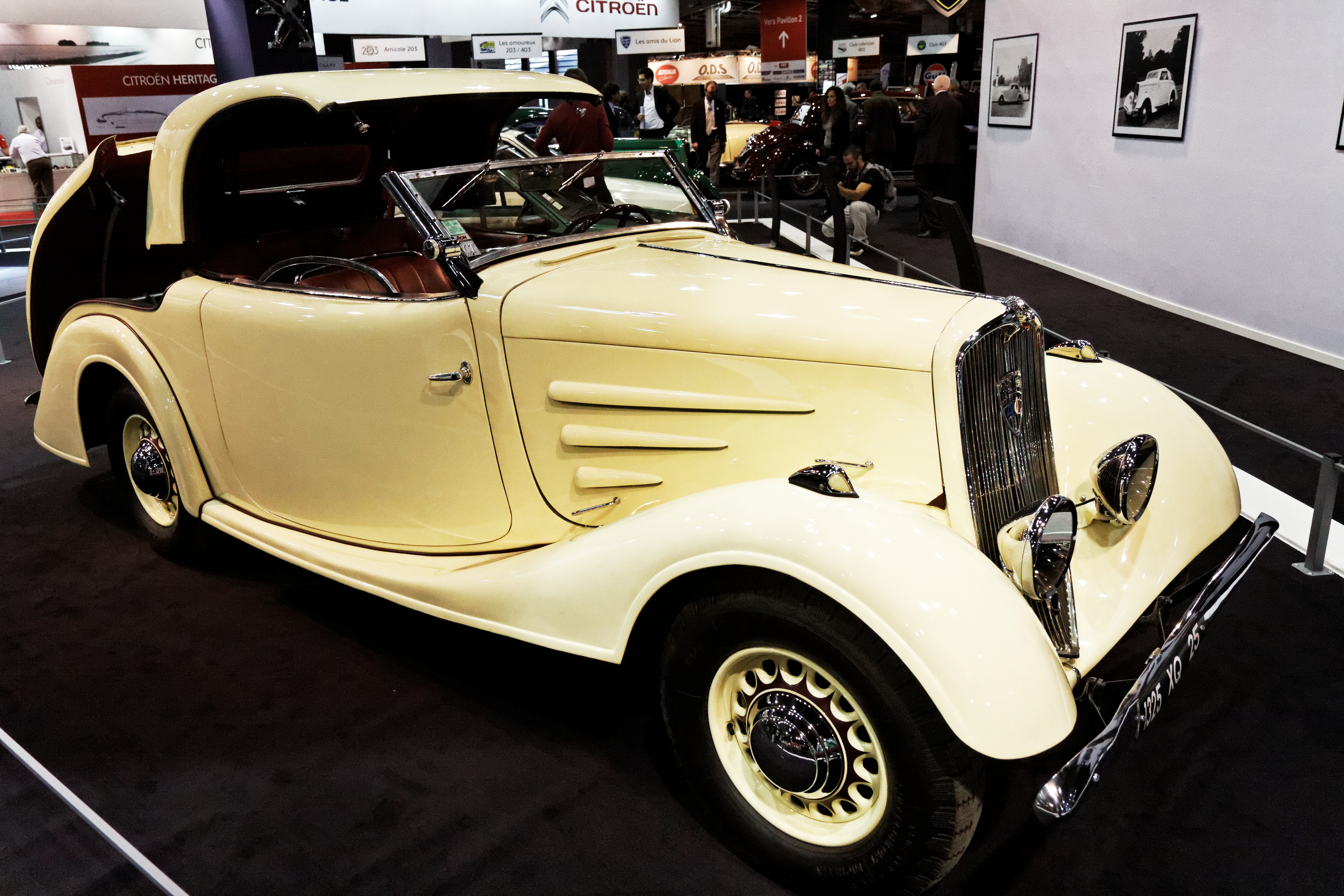
1934 Peugeot 401D Coupé transformable Eclipse (Pourtout)

1922 Ben P. Ellerbeck was granted a patent (U.S. No. 1,379,906 on 31 May 1921) for a retractable hardtop roof design for cars. He developed several scale models for the 1922 Automobile Body Builders Exhibition in New York City. In 1922, he modified a 1919 Hudson Super Six roadster with his manually operated gear and spring "flip top" system. It allowed unimpeded use of the rumble seat even with the top down. The design was not put into production.

1931 Georges Paulin made his idea public by applying for a patent on a detachable hard roof design that could ultimately be moved and stowed automatically in a car's rear luggage compartment, under a reverse-hinged rear-deck lid.

1932 The French patent system granted Paulin patent number 733.380 for his Eclipse roof system on 5 July 1932.

1934 Paulin's Eclipse retractable hard roof was first presented on the Peugeot 401D Éclipse Décapotable, a low convertible coupé. In 1933, Paulin showed his designs to premier coachbuilder Marcel Pourtout, who hired him as lead designer, and in 1934 they equipped first a Peugeot 401D, followed by a 601C, with "Eclipse" roofs and bodywork, on chassis provided by Emile Darl'mat. The same year, a Lancia Belna, a French-built Lancia Augusta, was also built as an Eclipse.

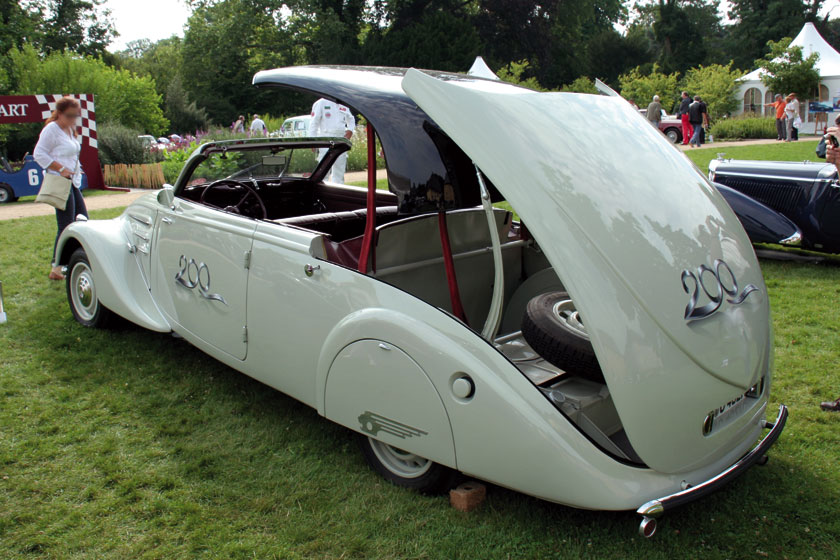
Factory Peugeot 402 Eclipse Decapotable (1938)

1935 Peugeot purchased Paulin's patent, and introduced the first factory production, power-operated, retractable hardtop in 1935, the "402BL Éclipse Décapotable", of which some 470 were built. Pourtout build custom examples, designed by Paulin, on other makes including Delage and Panhard as well as the "Eclipse" coupé-convertibles based on the Peugeot 301, 401, 601, 302, and 402.

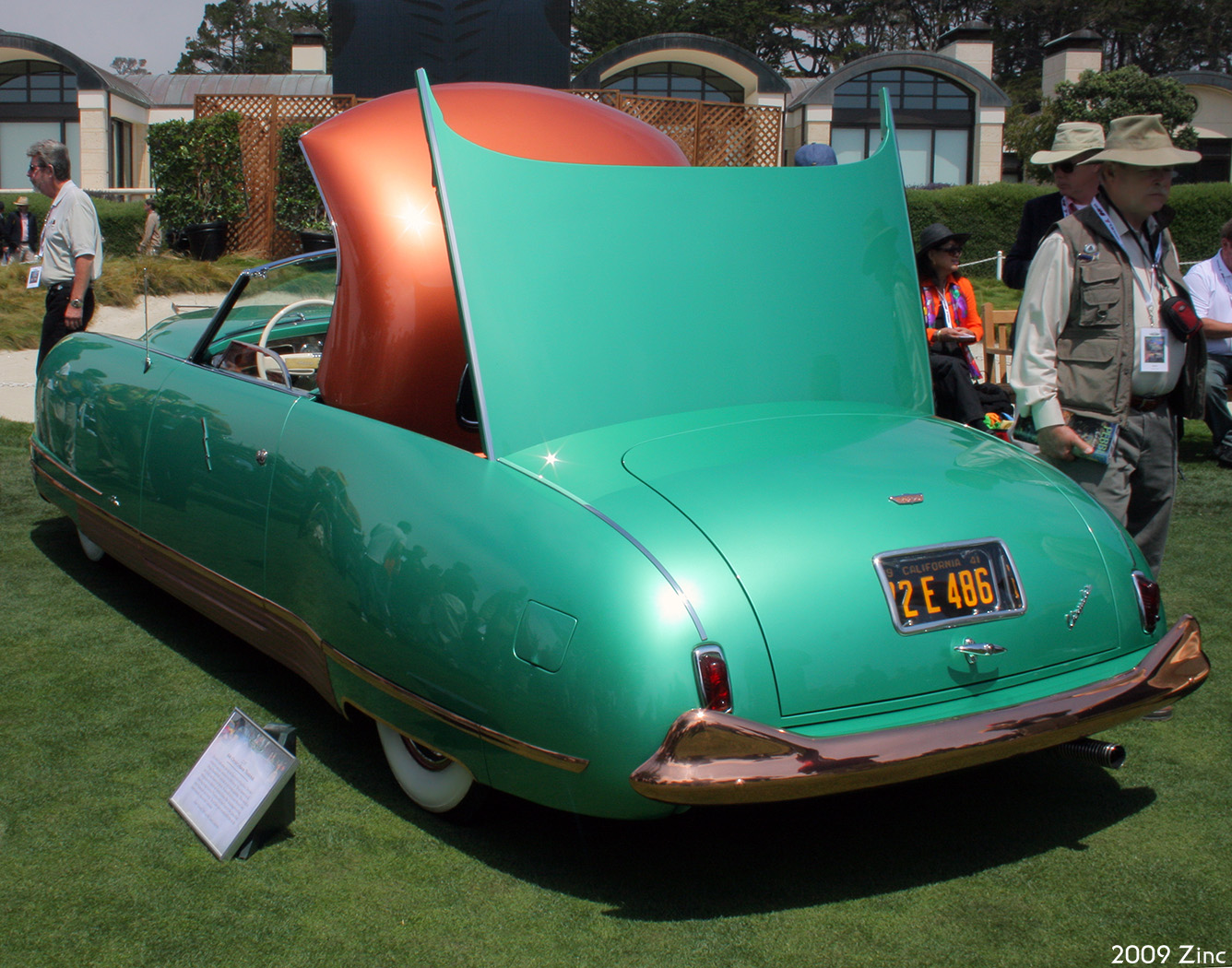
1941 Chrysler Thunderbolt concept car

1941 Chrysler introduced a retractable hardtop concept car, the Chrysler Thunderbolt.

1947 American Playboy Automobile Company marketed one of the first series produced convertibles, with a retractable roof consisting of more than one section. Ninety-seven production models were made until the company's bankruptcy in 1951.

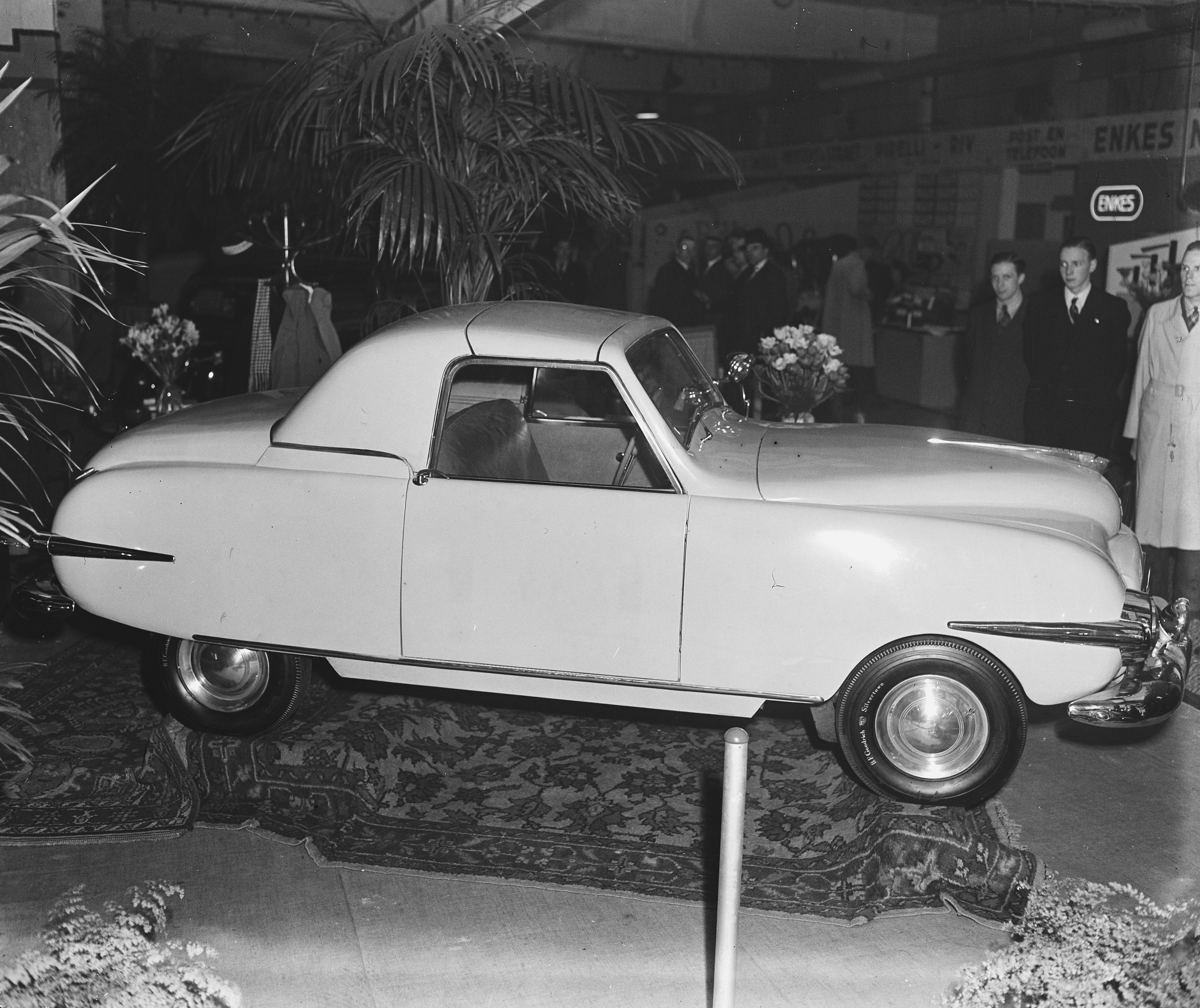
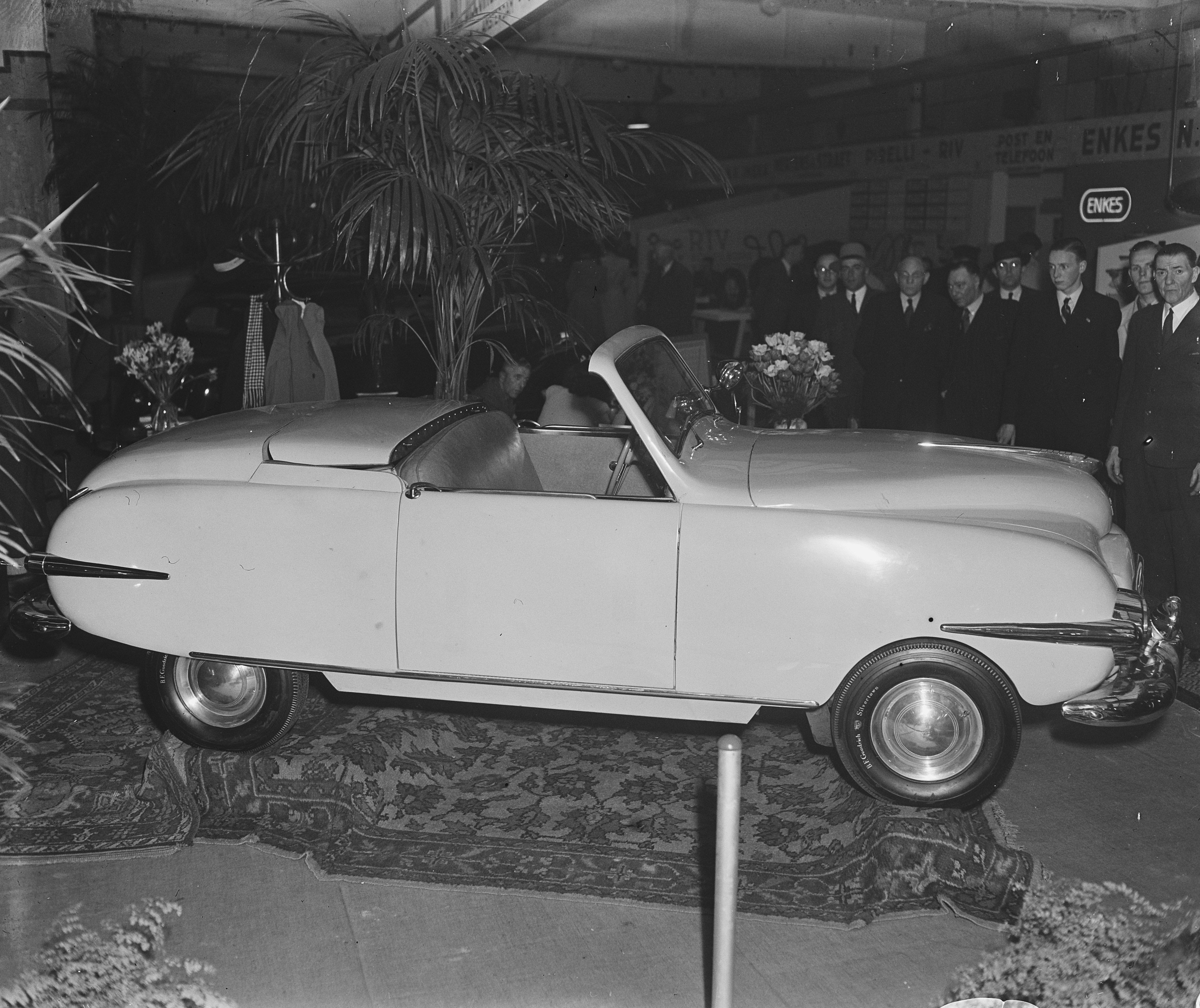
The 1948 Playboy car with its top in a closed and open configuration

1953 Ford Motor Company spent an estimated US$2 million (US$24,067,164 in 2025 dollars) to engineer a Continental Mark II with a servo-operated retractable roof. The concept was rejected for cost and marketing reasons. Engineering work was used by Ford for the retractable mechanism in their 1957 through 1959 flagship Ford Fairlane 500 Skyliner.

1955 Brothers Ed and Jim Gaylord showed a prototype, called the Gaylord Gladiator, at the 1955 Paris Motor Show, but the car failed to reach production.

1956 After working for 4,000 hours and investing $100 in the whole car, Raymond P. Meyette built a one-piece power-operated hardtop convertible using a 1952 Nash Ambassador chassis.

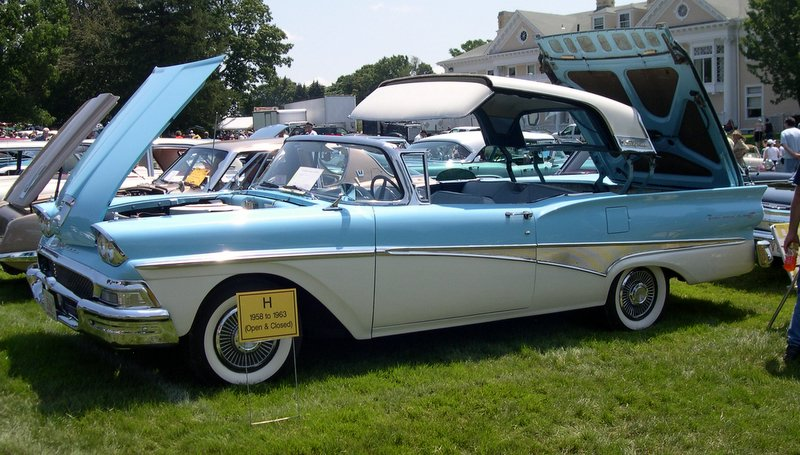
1958 Ford Fairlane 500 Skyliner with roof in mid folding action

1957 Ford introduced the Fairlane 500 Skyliner in the United States. Further development of the 1953 Continental Mark II retractable proposal cost an estimated US$18 million (US$206,338,863 in 2025 dollars). The Skyliner was a halo car with little luggage space and was priced double the baseline Ford sedan. A total of 48,394 were built from 1957 until 1959. Its mechanism contained ten power relays, ten limit switches, four lock motors, three drive motors, eight circuit breakers, as well as 610 feet (190 m) of electrical wire. It could raise or lower the top in about 40 seconds. The retractable top was noted for its complexity and usual reliability in the pre-transistor era.

1989 Toyota introduced a retractable hardtop, the MZ20 Soarer Aerocabin. The car featured an electric folding hardtop and was marketed as a two-seater with a cargo area behind the front seats. Production was 500 units.

1995 The Mitsubishi GTO Spyder by ASC was marketed in the U.S. The design was further popularized by such cars as the 1996 Mercedes-Benz SLK. and 2001 Peugeot 206 CC.

2006 Peugeot presented a concept four-door retractable hardtop convertible, the Peugeot 407 Macarena. Produced by French coachbuilding specialist Heuliez, the Macarena's top folded in about 30 seconds. It has a reinforcing beam behind the front seats incorporating LCD screens into the crossmember for the rear passengers.

== Construction ==
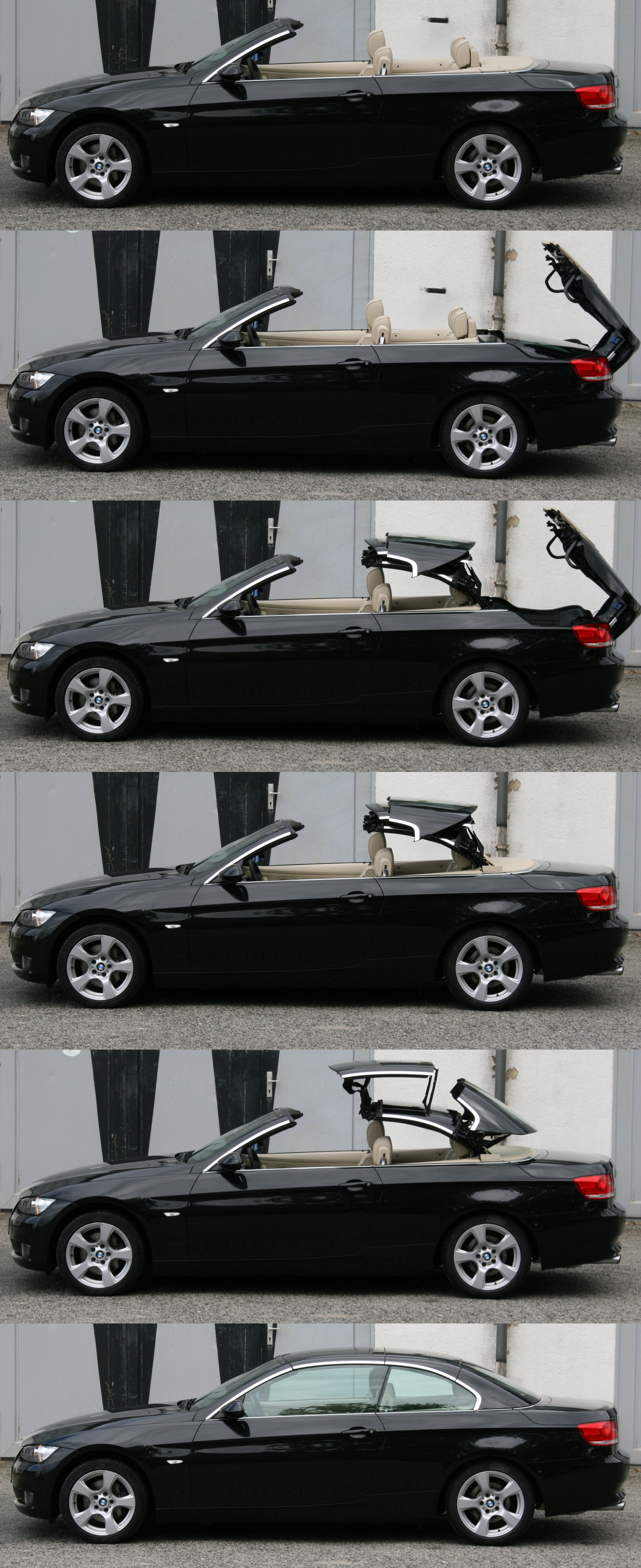
Closing of the retractable hardtop of a BMW 3-series (E93)

Retractable hardtops are commonly made from between two and five sections of metal or plastic and often rely on complex dual-hinged trunk/boot lids that enable the trunk lid to both receive the retracting top from the front and also receive parcels or luggage from the rear. The trunk also often includes a divider mechanism to prevent the loading of luggage that would conflict with the operation of the hardtop.

=== Variations ===
- The Volkswagen Eos features a five-segment retractable roof where one section is an independently sliding transparent sunroof.
- The Mercedes SL hardtop features a glass section that rotates during retraction to provide a more compact "stack."
- The third-generation Mazda MX-5 was available with an optional power retractable hardtop in place of the standard folding-textile soft-top. Compared to the regular soft-top, the hardtop weighed 77 lb (35 kg) more. It did not reduce cargo capacity. The hardtop roof was polycarbonate and manufactured by the German firm Webasto.
- The retractable hardtop used on the Chrysler Sebring (and its successor the Chrysler 200) was marketed alongside a soft-top. According to development engineer Dave Lauzun, the Karmann-made tops were installed into identical body designs and used the same automatic tonneau cover, luggage divider, and luggage space. The retractable version featured an underbody cross-brace not included in the softtop.

== Comparison with soft tops ==
The retractable hardtop's advantages include:

- More weatherly when the roof is raised
- More secure than fabric tops
- Increased structural rigidity
- May enable consolidation/simplification of a manufacturer's car lineup; for example, the BMW Z4 (E89) was offered only as a coupé-convertible (hardtop), compared to the preceding E85 generation that had separate coupé and cabriolet (soft-top) variants.

The retractable hardtop's disadvantages include:

- Higher initial cost
- Increased mechanical complexity
- Potentially diminished passenger and trunk space compared to a soft-top convertible.
- Higher weight and center of gravity than soft-top convertibles, potentially reducing handling.
- Potential need for more than minimum clearance while operating the hardtop. For example, the Volvo C70 requires 6.5 feet (2 m) of vertical clearance during operation, the Cadillac XLR requires 6 ft 10 1/2 in (2 m) of vertical clearance and the Mercedes SLK's trunk lid extends rearward while lowering or lifting the top.

== Gallery ==
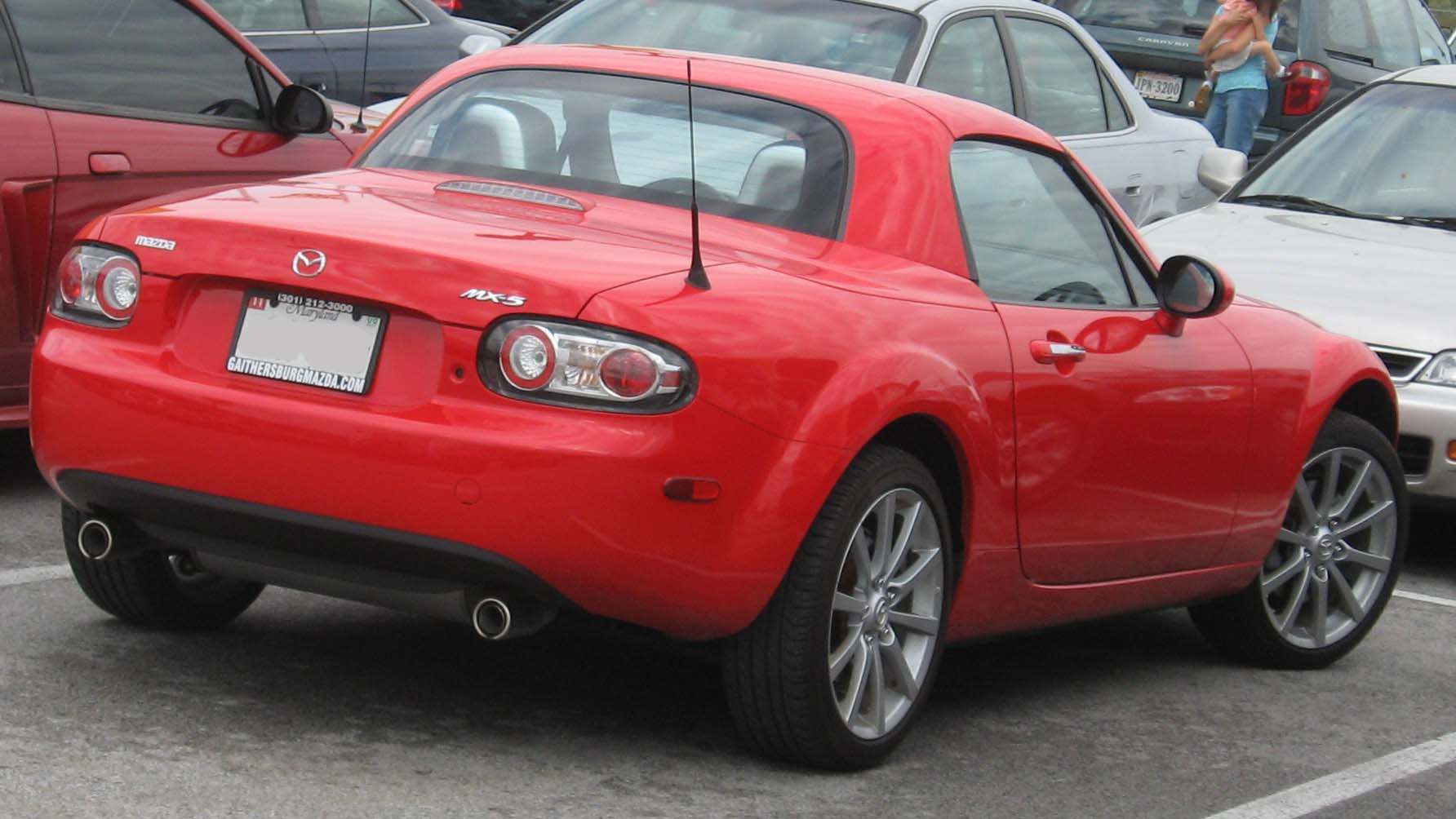
Mazda Miata Power Retractable Hard Top (PRHT) c. 2007, with polycarbonate hardtop

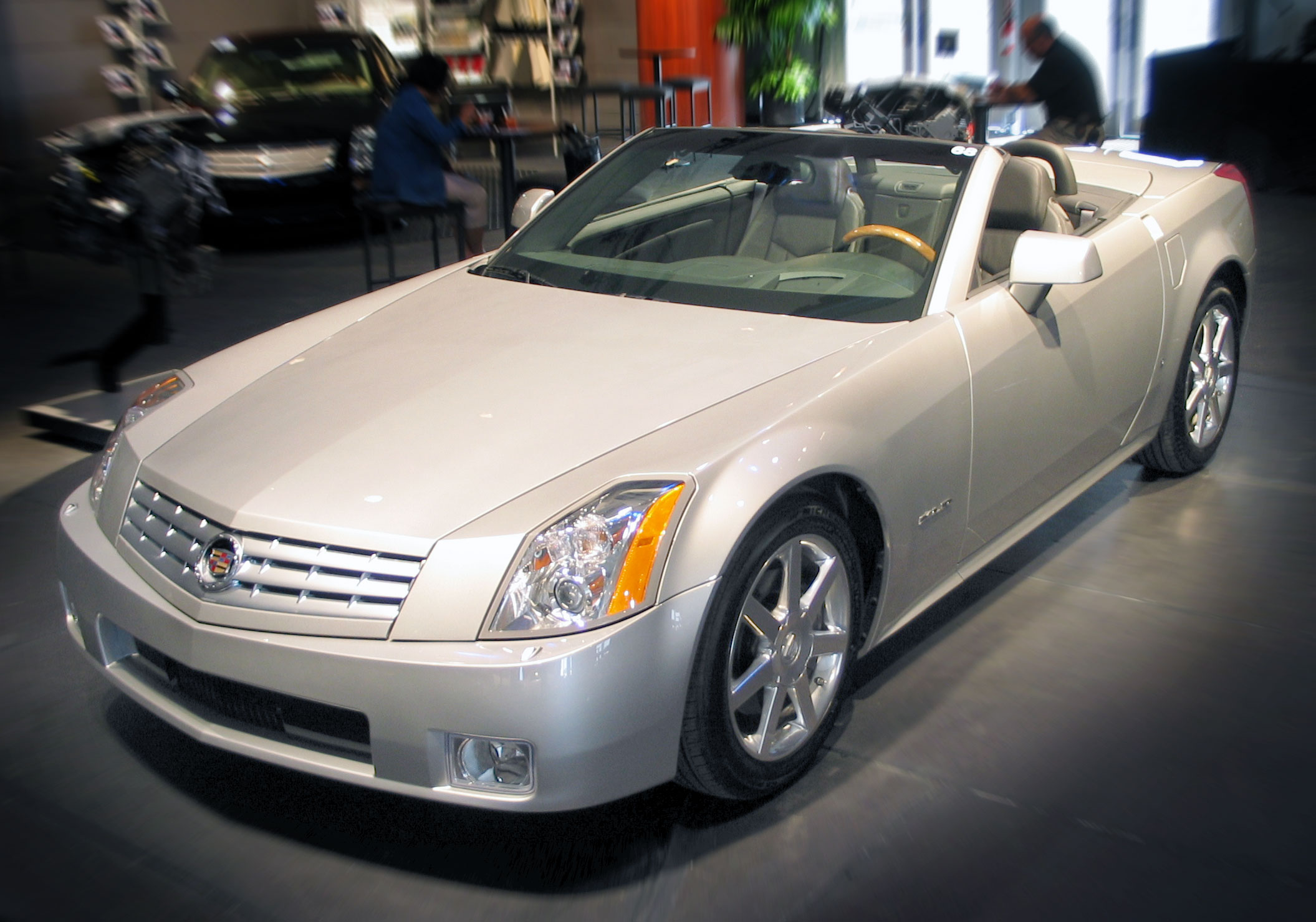
Cadillac XLR c. 2007, aluminum hardtop made by a joint venture of Mercedes-Benz and Porsche

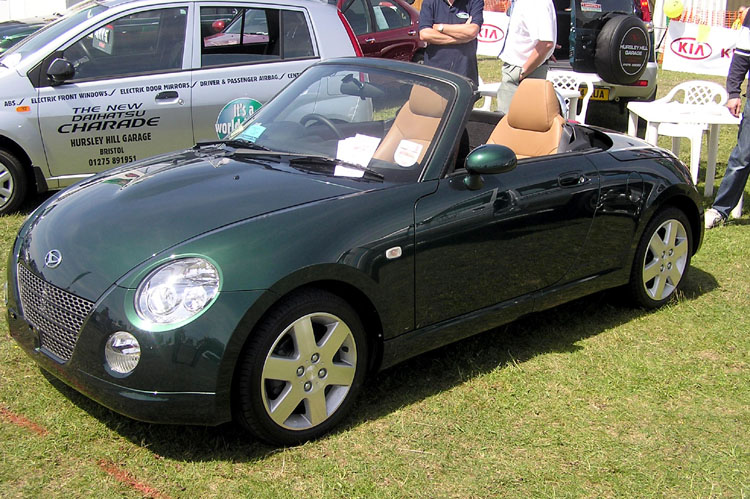
Daihatsu Copen c. 2001, a retractable hardtop in the Japanese Kei class

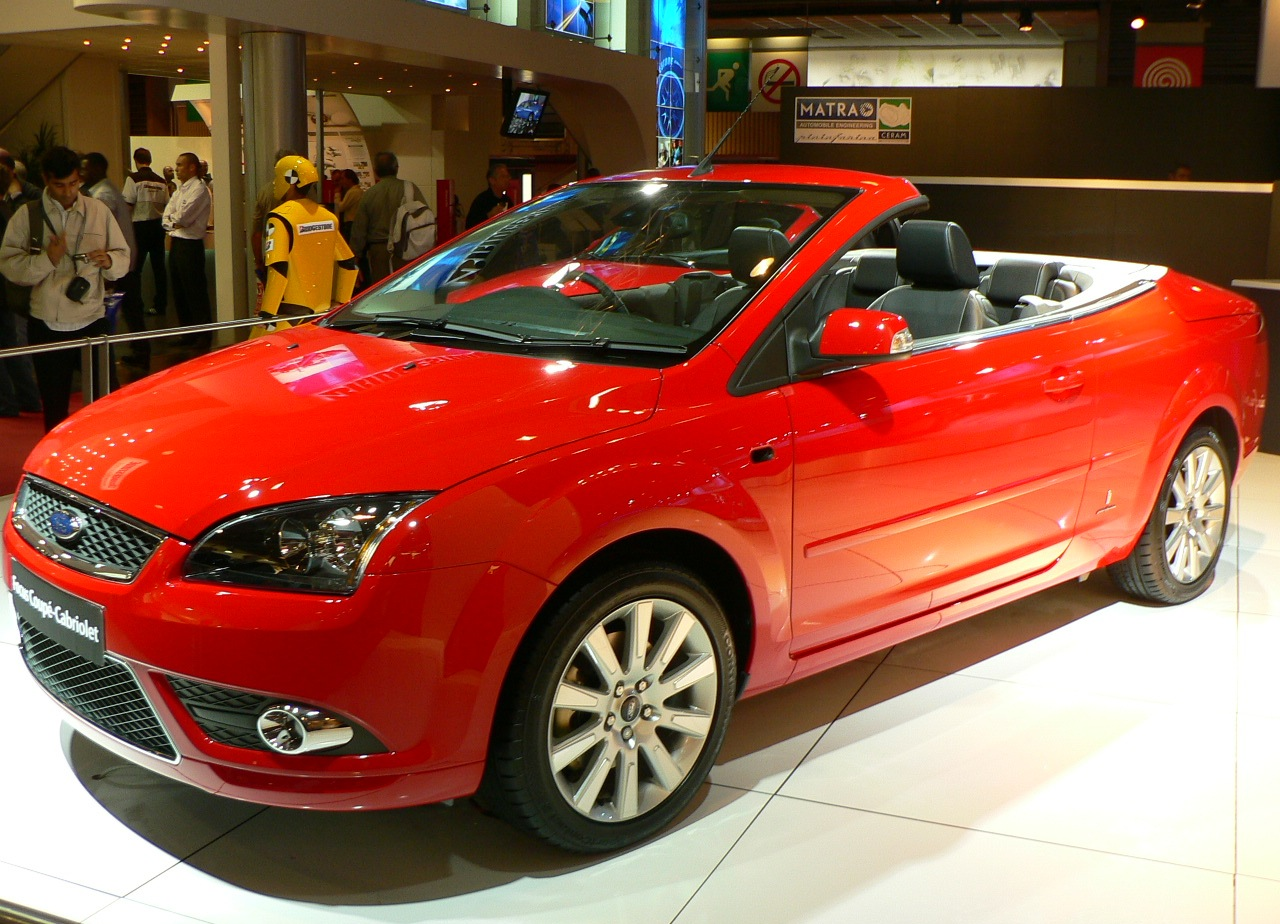
Ford Focus CC c. 2006, its retractable hardtop final assembly by Pininfarina

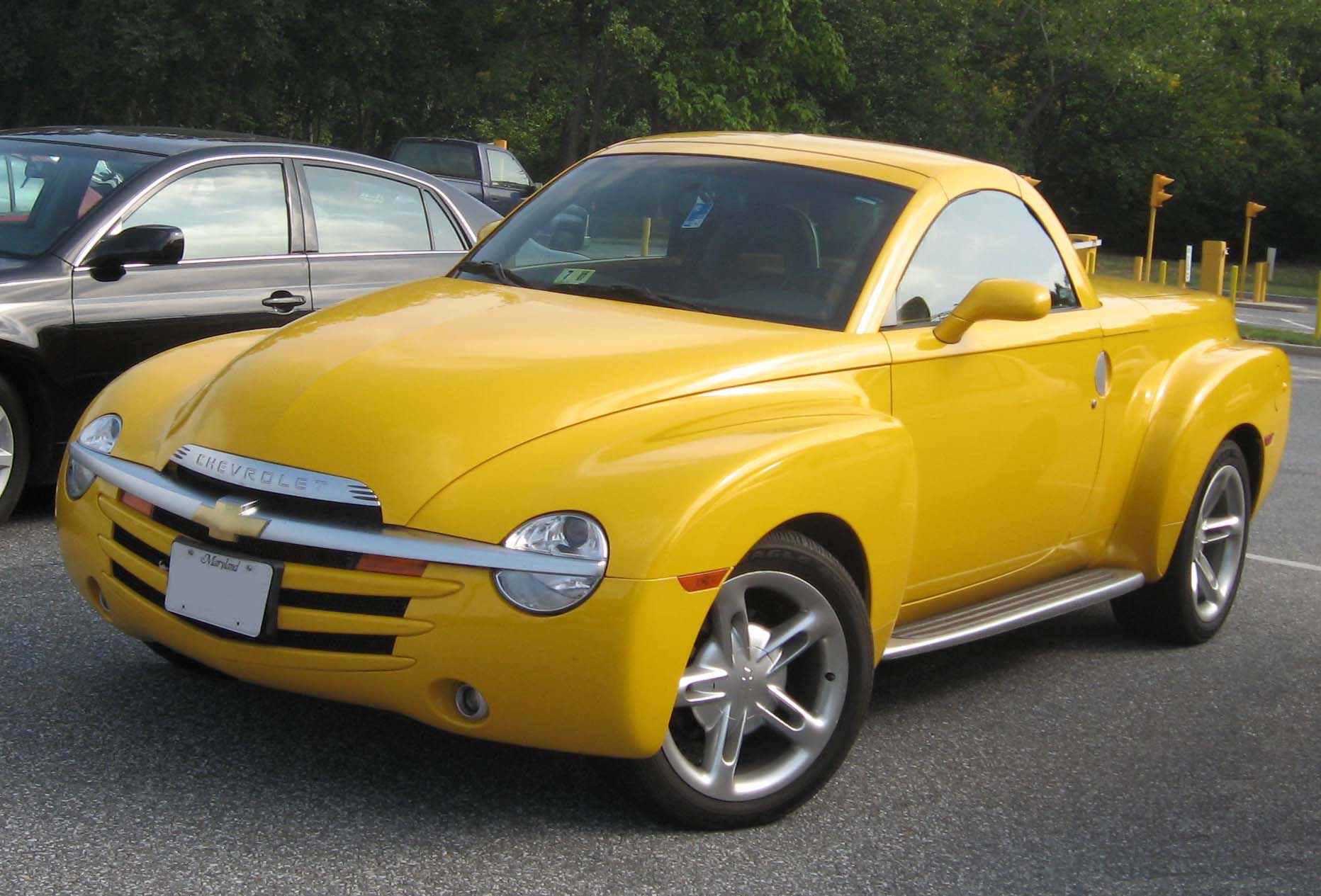
Chevrolet SSR c. 2004, pickup truck retractable hardtop engineered by ASC

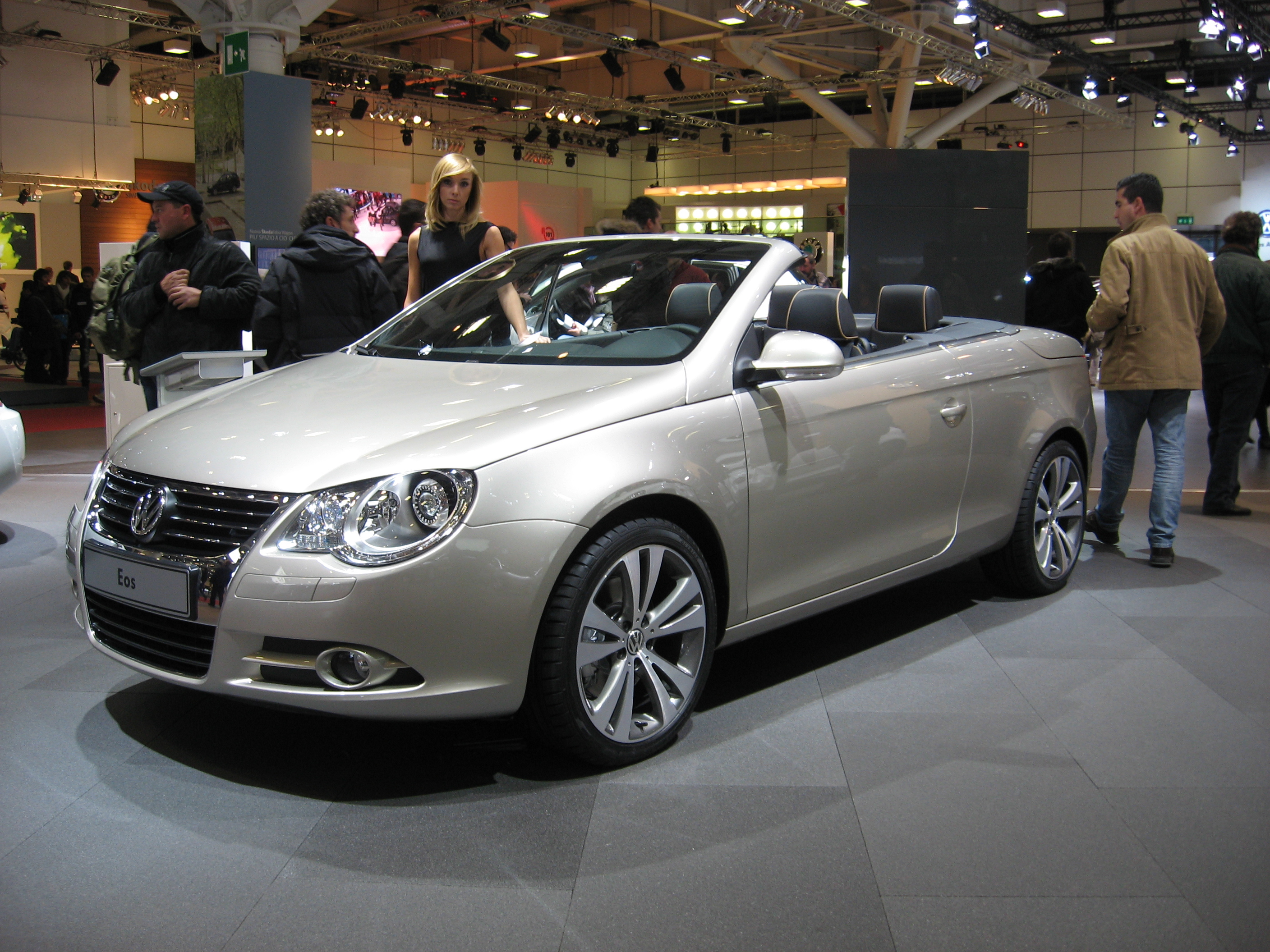
Volkswagen Eos c. 2007, the five-segment top includes a sliding sunroof made by OASys

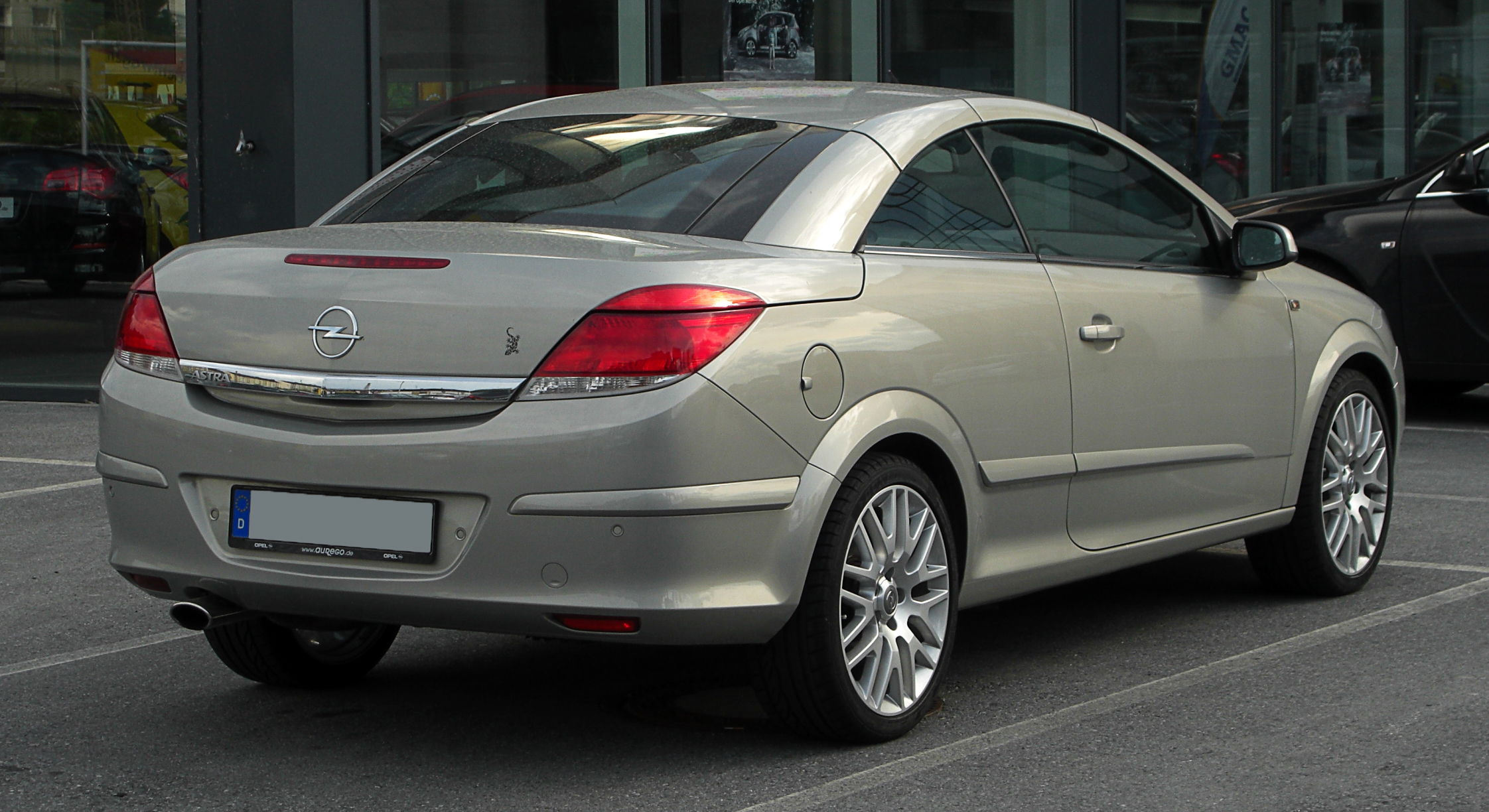
Opel Astra Twintop (2005-2012), three-part roof stores in the upper half of the boot for luggage space below it
