= Gaylord Gladiator =

American automobile model

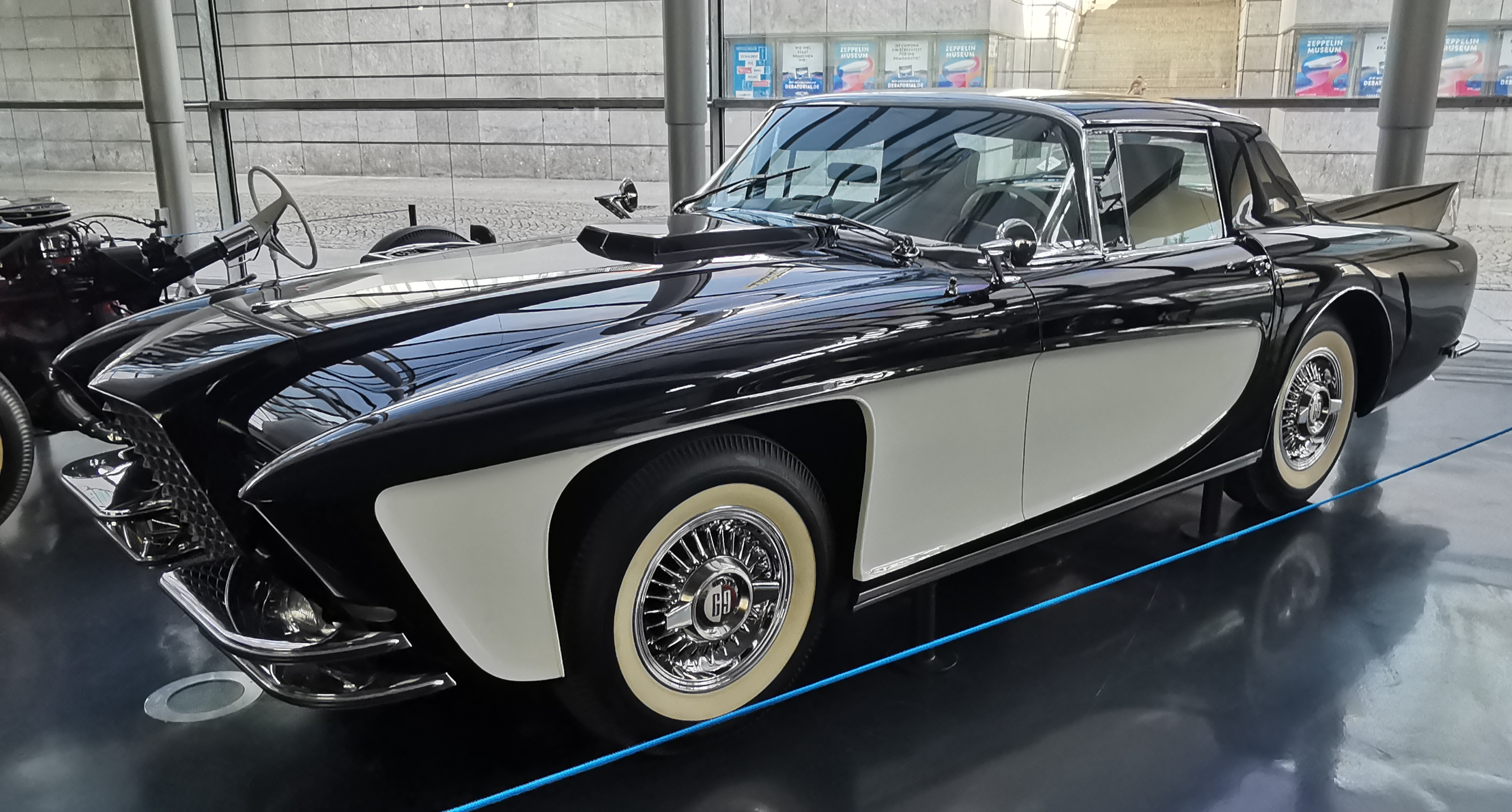

Overview
- Manufacturer: Gaylord Cars, Luftschiffbau Zeppelin
- Production: 1955–1957
- Designer: Brooks Stevens

Body and chassis
- Class: Personal luxury car
- Body style: 2-door retractable hardtop convertible
- Chassis: 41xx steel

Powertrain
- Engine: Cadillac 365 V8

Dimensions
- Curb weight: 1,800 kg (3,968 lb)

The Gaylord Gladiator is an American automobile model.

== History ==
The Gaylord Gladiator was conceptualized in the 1950s by James and Edward Gaylord, sons of the possible inventor of the bobby pin, and the owners of Gaylord Cars.

They approached Alex Tremulis with their design, but he was working for the Ford Motor Company at the time. They then went to Brooks Stevens, who designed it. The prototype was presented at the 1955 Paris Motor Show, receiving a negative reaction.

Between 1955 and 1957, either three or four were produced, costing $17,500 to purchase (about $210,000 in 2025). Two of the cars were bought by monarch Farouk of Egypt and actor Dick Powell. Manufacturing was transferred to airship manufacturer Luftschiffbau Zeppelin, but they failed to build the cars correctly. The Gaylords sued, and they eventually ceased production. Only two are known to exist; one is owned by a private American, the other—which was restored in 2017—is in the Zeppelin Museum Friedrichshafen.

== Design ==
The Gaylord Gladiator featured a 365-cubic inch Cadillac V8 engine and a 41xx steel chassis. It was painted black and white, with whitewall tires. Small swords were used as needles in the instruments.

== Gallery ==
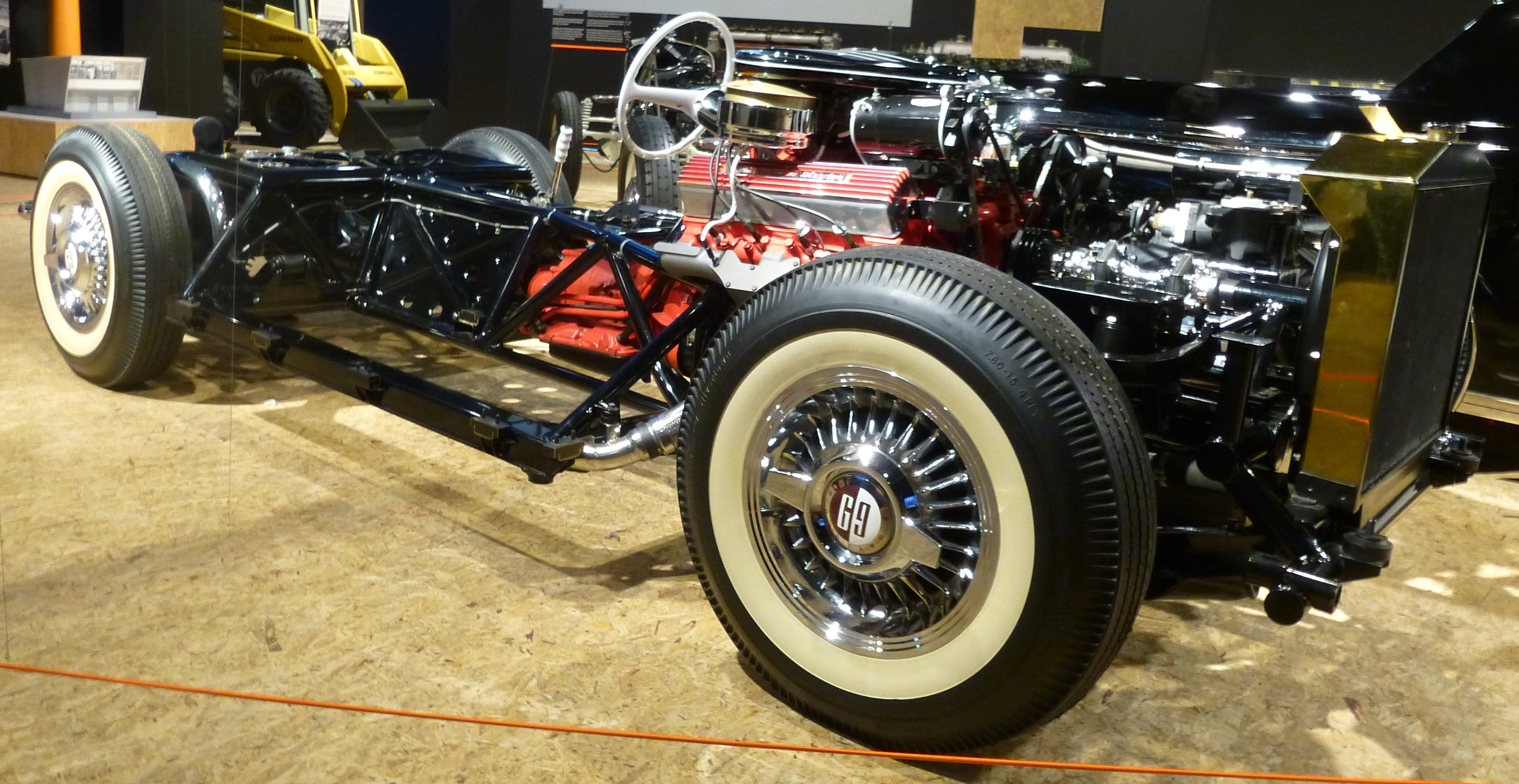
Chassis

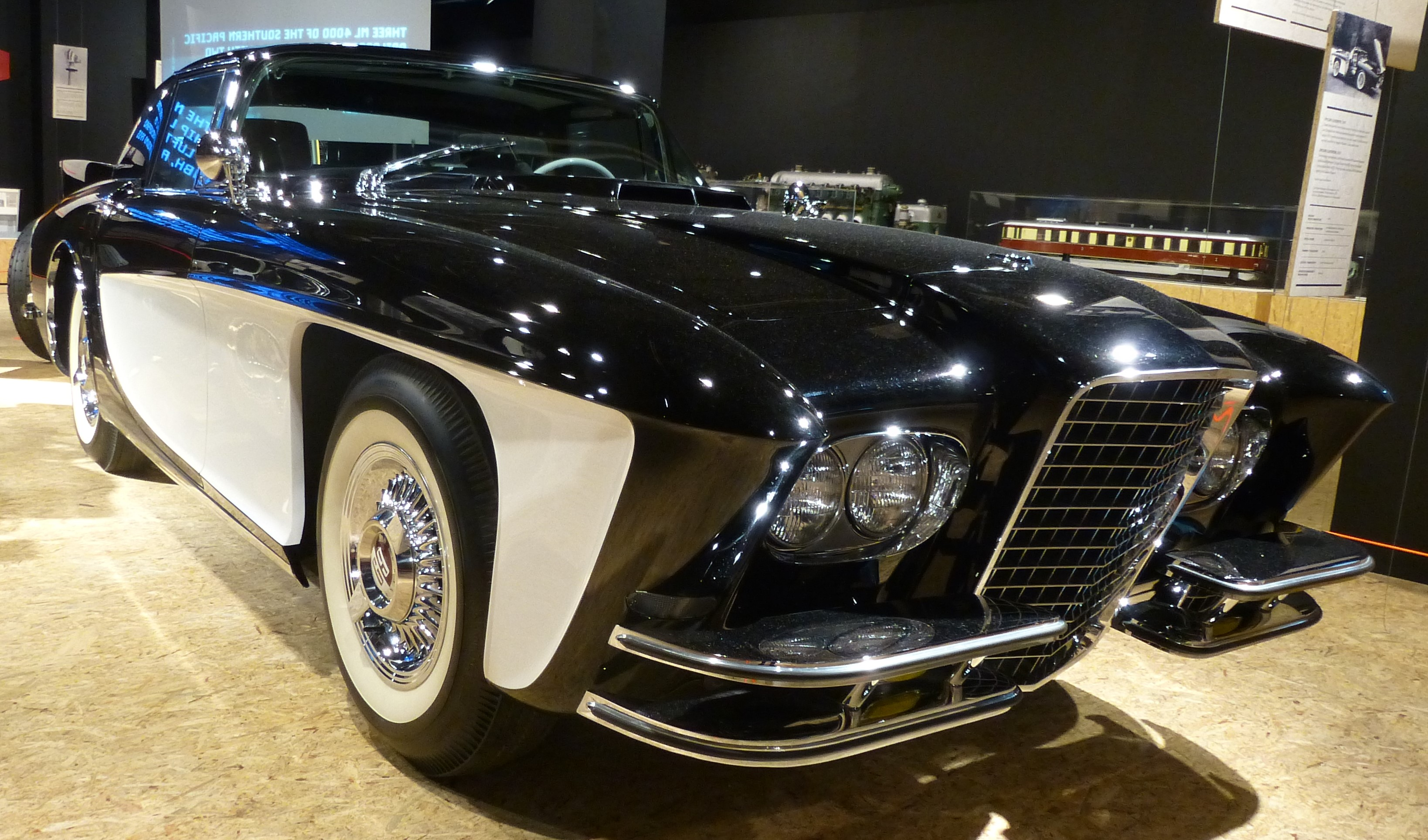
Front view

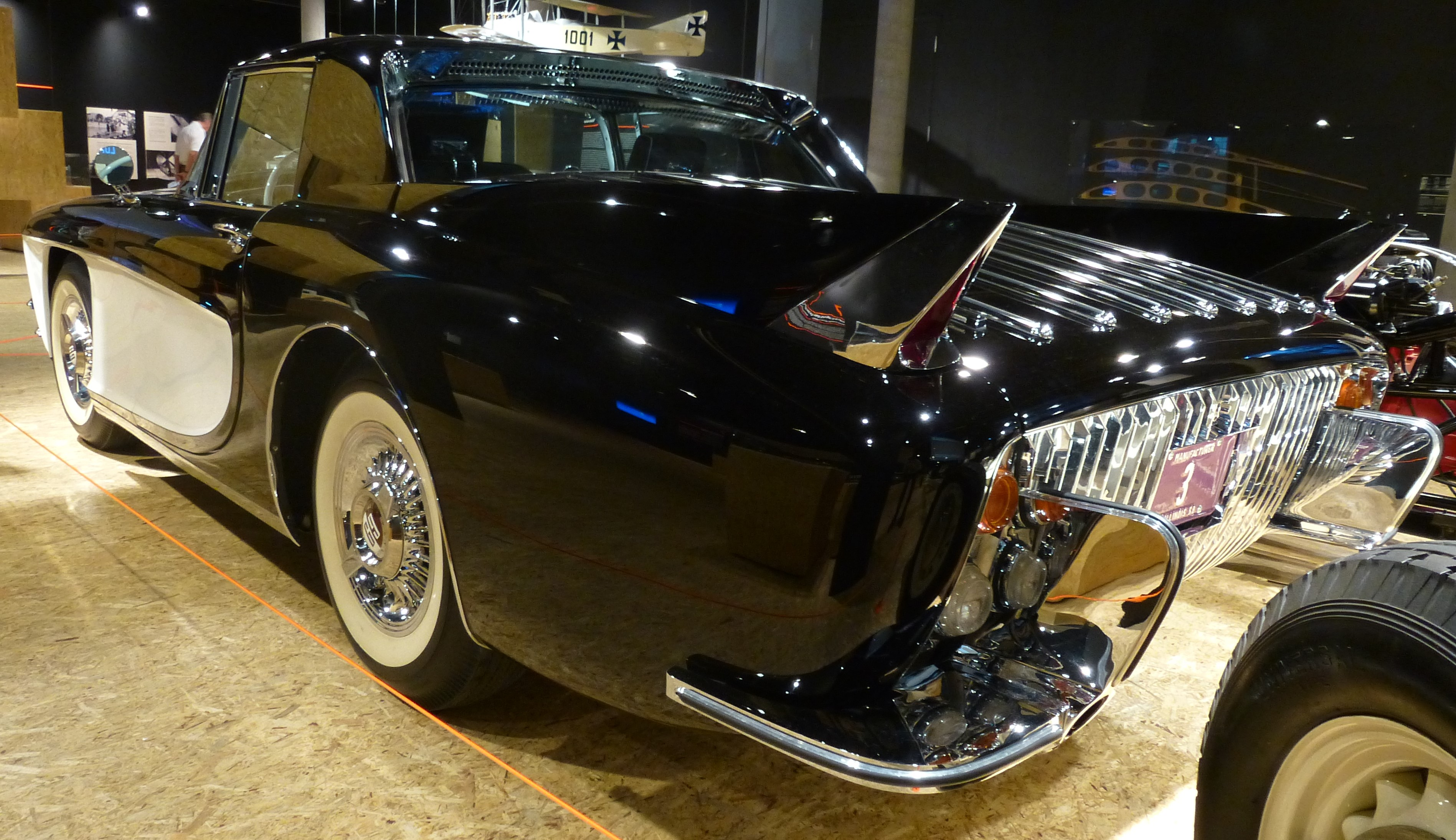
Back view
