= Rogue's Gallery (radio series) =

American radio series

- Running time: 30 minutes
- Country of origin: United States
- Language: English
- Home station: NBC, ABC
- Starring: Dick Powell; Barry Sullivan; Chester Morris; Paul Stewart; Peter Leeds
- Announcer: Jim Doyle
- Written by: Ray Buffum
- Directed by: Dee Engelbach
- Produced by: Charles Vanda

Rogue's Gallery, first titled as Bandwagon Mysteries, was an American detective drama radio program. Its title is a play on the name of its main character, Richard Rogue, and a collection of photographs of criminals, commonly known as a rogues' gallery.

Rogue's Gallery was a summer replacement series for The Fitch Bandwagon in 1945, 1946, and 1947 on NBC; star Dick Powell was in the middle of a type transition, from singing juvenile lead to serious dramatic actor. Rogue's Gallery immediately followed his successful transition in the film Murder, My Sweet.

Richard Rogue is a private detective who often finds himself in the company of beautiful women. In a typical episode, as he works on a case, he loses consciousness, whether through a blow to the head or by being drugged, and is met by Eugor ("Rogue" spelled backwards), his alter ego, who points out an overlooked piece of evidence. Once awake, Rogue proceeds to solve the case with this new information in mind. Eugor was voiced by Peter Leeds.

For a detective drama, the show was relatively lighthearted, much like Powell's subsequent show, Richard Diamond, Private Detective.

Powell left the show after the second season. Barry Sullivan, Chester Morris, and Paul Stewart starred as Rogue in its final two seasons. It aired for a final and full season from 1950 to 1951 on ABC.
