= Ford Fairlane Crown Victoria Skyliner =

1955 Ford Fairlane Crown Victoria Transparent Top model
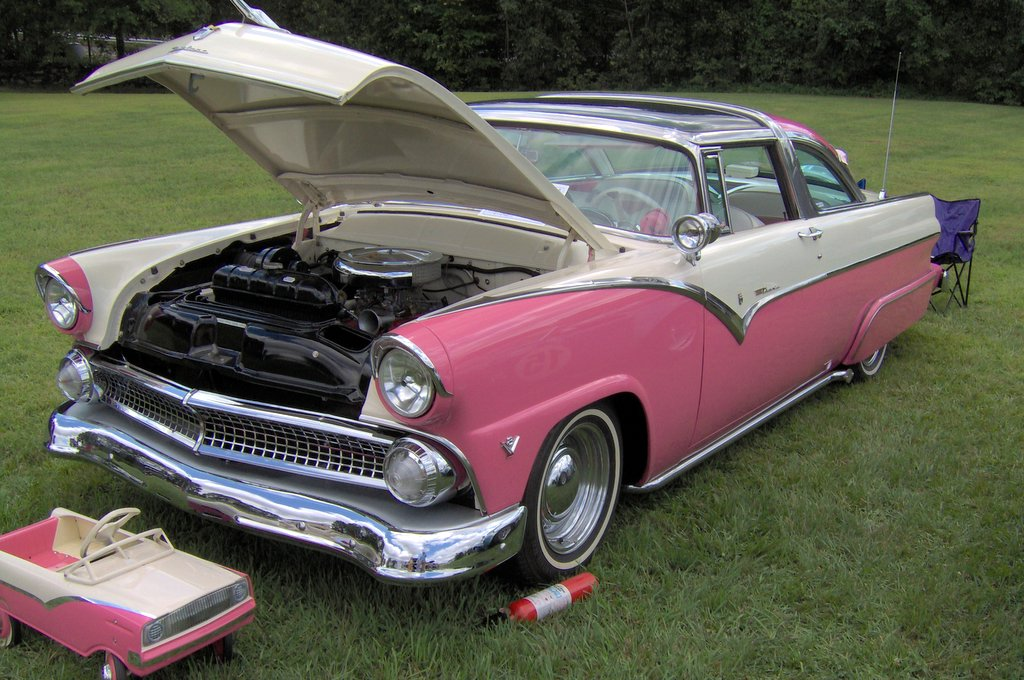

Overview
- Manufacturer: Ford
- Production: 1955

Chronology
- Predecessor: Ford Crestline Skyliner
- Successor: Ford Fairlane Crown Victoria Skyliner

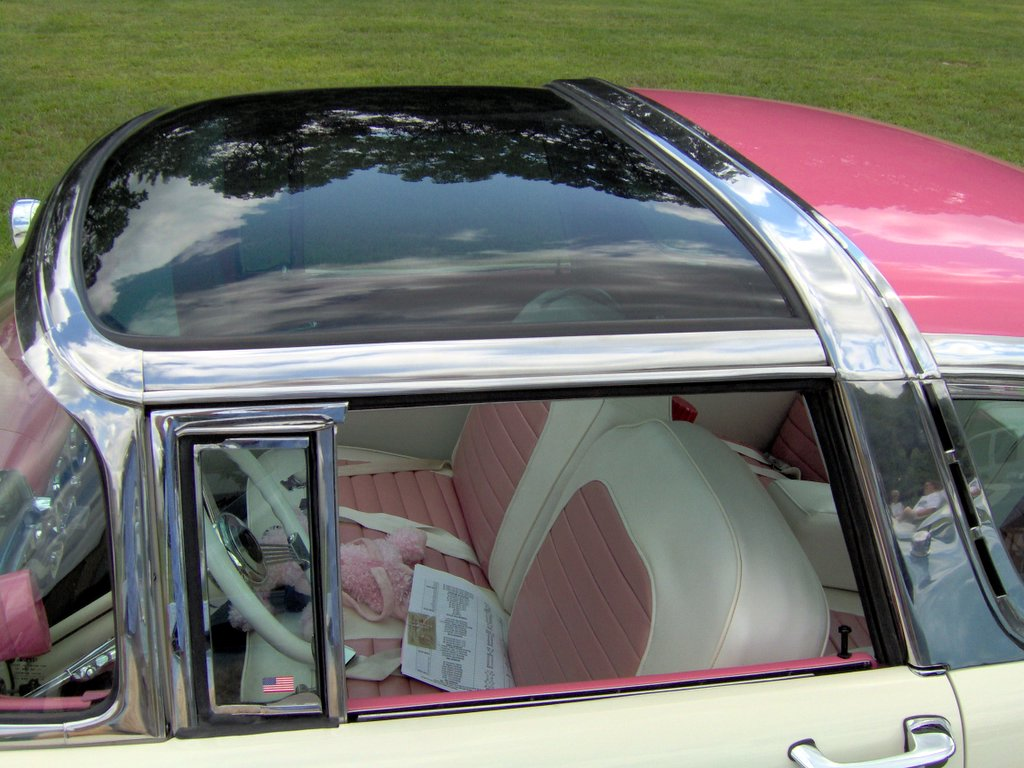
1955 Ford Crown Victoria Transparent Top model—with a transparent front roof section of blue-green tinted, 1/4-in thick, molded, acrylic-plastic and an interior ″aluminized nylon″ sunshade.

Ford Motor Company used the name ″Skyliner″ for 1954 and 1956 models, but not for the ″1955 Ford Fairlane Crown Victoria Transparent Top″ model. 1955 Ford brochures, manuals, and advertisements state ″Transparent Top.″ Dealerships abbreviated the name to ″T/P″ or ″T/T.″

However, the 1955 car is often (mistakenly) referred to as a ″Skyliner″ as it has a transparent top just like the named ″Skyliner″ 1954 and 1956 models have.

″Glass Top″ is a common street name for transparent top Fords.

The ″sky-view″ transparent top is actually a front roof section of blue-green tinted, 1/4-in thick, molded, acrylic-plastic (not Plexiglas®). It is weather-sealed and unaffected by heat, cold, or moisture. The Owner's Manual states that it can be washed with water and soap, polished with Luster-Seal Haze Cream, and that a Ford dealership can remove scratches. Included was an interior pull-out, 2-section, 3-zipper, adjustable, ″aluminized nylon″ sunshade curtain.

== Models ==
Ford's three mid-1950s transparent top cars are:

1) 1954 Ford Crestline Skyliner. Two-door pillarless hardtop with a transparent top. Price was $2,164 with the standard Ford I-block 6-cyl 223-cid 115-hp A-code engine and Conventional Drive 3-speed manual transmission. 1954 Crestline Skyliner production was only 13,344.

2) 1955 Ford Fairlane Crown Victoria Transparent Top. Two-door, with distinctive bright-metal stainless-steel B-pillar and mid-roof tiara (″crown-of-chrome″) trim and transparent top. The transparent top was a +$69.49 option on the Fairlane Crown Victoria body type 64A (steel-top) car (price $2,638.48 in L.A. Calif.) that then made the Fairlane Crown Victoria Transparent Top body type 64B car (price $2,707.97 in LA. Calif.—top included). Prices are with the standard Ford Y-block V-8 272-cid 162-hp U-code engine and Conventional Drive 3-speed manual transmission. 1955 Fairlane Crown Victoria Transparent Top production was only 1,999.

3) 1956 Ford Fairlane Crown Victoria Skyliner. Two-door, with distinctive bright-metal stainless-steel B-pillar and mid-roof tiara (″crown-of-chrome″) trim and transparent top. Price was $2802.99 in L.A. Calif. ($2914 in Wash. D.C.)—$70 more than the steel-top Crown Victoria. Prices are with the standard Thunderbird V-8 292-cid 200-hp (202-hp with Fordomatic Drive) M-code engine and Conventional Drive 3-speed manual transmission. 1956 Fairlane Crown Victoria Skyliner production was only 603.

Sales slipped as customers realized the problem of keeping interiors cool on hot days. The 1955 ComfortAire Conditioner ($400 est.) and 1956 SelectAire Conditioner ($435) were expensive options and only a few hundred (sources vary) were installed—rare cars, indeed.

The ″Skyliner″ name was later applied to the 1957, 1958, and 1959 Ford Fairlane 500 Skyliner cars that have the superb retractable hardtop, marketed as a ″hide-away-hardtop.″ During 1959, the name was changed to Ford Fairlane 500 Galaxie Skyliner. The total 3-year production was 48,394.

The ″Victoria″ name reflects the Victorian era (1837-1901) horse-drawn carriage that featured a front, raised, open, coachman's seat and a rear, low-slung, forward-facing, two-passenger seat protected by a prominent calash (hooded, folding) top. It provided fashionable park rides for stylish English ladies, as guided by one or two uniformed coachmen.

Transparent tops were also offered by Mercury as the 1954 Mercury Monterey Sun Valley (production 9,761) and the 1955 Mercury Montclair Sun Valley (production 1,787). There were two unique-to-Canada variants of the plexiglass roof: the 1954 Meteor Rideau Skyliner (production 9,764), and the even more rare 1954 Monarch Lucerne Sun Valley (production 200 est.). Meteor was a stand-alone marque sold though Mercury dealerships. Correspondingly, the Monarch was a stand-alone marque that was sold through Ford dealerships.

Similar roof panels were used on General Motors products of the time. The concept of a single, fixed window over the front seat reappeared in the late 1970s on Lincoln's full-size Continental models (through 1979), and later, over the rear seat of General Motors' 1964-1977 Oldsmobile Vista Cruiser and Buick Sport Wagons. It later re appeared on the 1991 Oldsmobile Custom Cruiser and Buick Roadmaster wagons. The 2004-2009 Opel Astra offered a ″panoramic windshield,″ which is similar in concept. The Ford Flex also offered rear roof panels over the rear seat rows.

== Sources ==
- 1955 Ford all-models brochure
- All the Facts about the 1955 Ford
- 1955 Ford Owner's Manual
- 1955 and 1956 Transparent Top abbreviated terms
- 1955-ford.com
- 1956-ford.com

== Other reading ==
- David L. Lewis (2005). 100 Years of Ford. Publications International. ISBN 0-7853-7988-6.
