= Peugeot 601 =

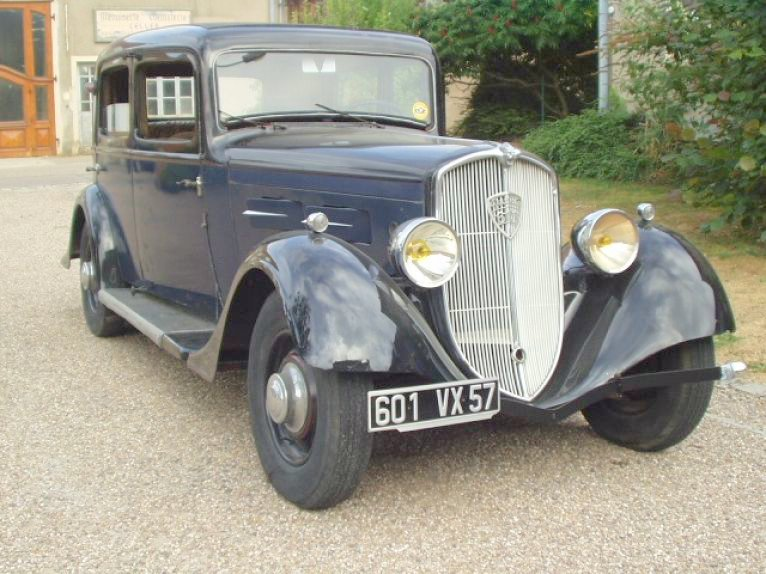

Overview
- Manufacturer: S. A. des Automobiles Peugeot
- Production: 1934–1935; 3,999 produced

Body and chassis
- Body style: saloon limousine familiale cabriolet roadster coupe
- Layout: FR layout

Powertrain
- Engine: 2,148 cc straight-6 60 hp at 3500 rpm

Dimensions
- Length: 4,600 mm (181.1 in)-5,080 mm (200.0 in)
- Width: 1,600 mm (63.0 in)
- Curb weight: 1,400 kg (3,100 lb)

Chronology
- Predecessor: Peugeot Type 183; Peugeot Type 176
- Successor: Peugeot 604

The Peugeot 601 was a range-topping car produced between 1934 and 1935 by Peugeot. It had its formal launch on 5 May 1934 and marked a return by the manufacturer to six-cylinder engines.

The car was Peugeot's first entry into the luxury car market since 1932, after which the Peugeot Type 183, Peugeot Type 184, Peugeot Type 174 and Peugeot Type 176 had been discontinued.

Together with the Peugeot 401 Eclipse, the very limited production 601 Eclipse was the first series produced car to be built (by Carrosserie Pourtout) as a coupé-convertible, with a retractable hardtop, that could be moved and stowed under a reverse-hinged rear luggage lid.

== Powertrain ==
The car was equipped with an inline 6-cylinder 2148 cc engine developing 60 hp at 3500 rpm. With limited power and relatively high weight, the car came with a listed top speed of only 105 kilometres per hour (65 mph) or 110 kilometres per hour (68 mph). The actual top speed would have varied according to the body fitted; the weight, including the car body, was given in 1934 as between 1,180 kg (2,600 lb) and 1,250 kg (2,760 lb) (or 1,400 kg (3,100 lb) for some long wheelbase versions).

A feature of the engine that attracted comment was the thermostatically controlled temperature regulator for the engine oil, which worked with an oil pump by redirecting the oil through, or away from, what was in effect a heat exchanger in a chamber filled with water from the radiator.

Like other Peugeots of the era, the 601 was equipped with independent front suspension.

== Body ==
The 601 was closely based on the manufacturer's recently rebodied 201 and 301 models, but the longer six cylinder engine of the 601 required a longer wheelbase. As launched, the 601 came with two different wheelbases: 2,980 mm (117 in) for the 601 "Normale" and 3,200 mm (126 in) for the 601 "Longue".

There were three standard bodies offered for the "Normale" wheelbase cars: there was a four-door "Berline" (sedan/saloon) priced in Spring 1934 at 28,500 francs, a "Coach dėcapotable" with two doors, four seats and a cabriolet roof, priced at 34,000 francs of which only a handful were sold, and a two-seater "Roadster" which became a frequent prize winner at "concours d'ėlėgance" enthusiasts' meetings.

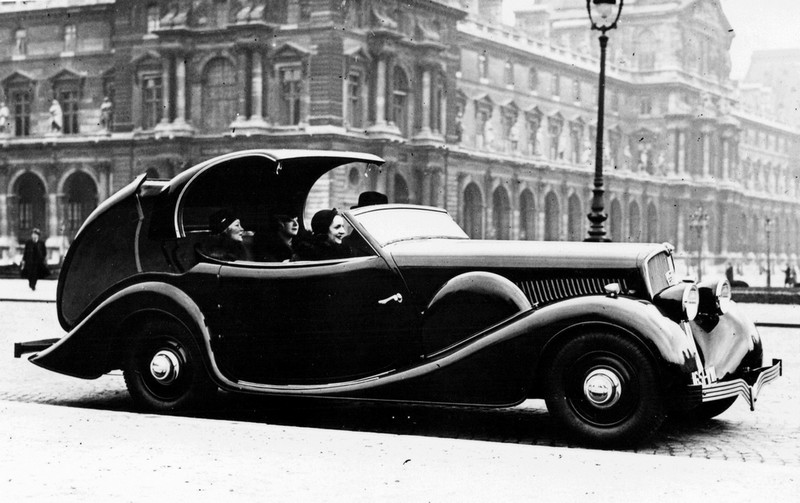
Peugeot 601 C Eclipse 1934 by Pourtout.

Four standard bodies were listed for the "Longue" wheelbase cars. The least costly, listed at 31,000 francs, was a six-light "limousine familiale" with four doors and a deep bench seat combined with large amounts of rear legroom. There was also a "Berline aėrodynamique" with four doors and a streamlined body with a steeply raked tail and an overall length above 5,000 mm (197 in), as well as a "Coach Sport" with two doors and four seats which exploited the longer wheelbase to support a low streamlined look. From the summer of 1934 there was another long two-door four-seater version listed, called the "Coach Profilė" .

Additionally, there was a special Eclipse body, with electrically folding metal roof. The 601 Eclipse was designed by dentist turned car designer (and later war hero) Georges Paulin, and built by coachbuilder Pourtout, on chassis provided by premier Paris Peugeot dealer Emile Darl'mat. This car gained renewed attention courtesy of the Peugeot publicity department in 1996 with the launch of the Mercedes-Benz SLK. The Mercedes featured a hinged steel roof that automatically folded into the boot/trunk at the press of a button, which was briefly claimed as a world first, until Peugeot pointed out that the 401 and 601 Eclipse had used the same arrangement (though the one-piece hardtop required a longer luggage end to be stowed in) sixty years earlier.

The 601 received a minor facelift for the 1935 model year, announced during the summer of 1934, only months after the car's launch: the most visible change was a lowering of the headlights.

== Commercial ==
The sales figures of the 601 were affected by the underwhelming performance of the engine. Nevertheless, given the large number of manufacturers jostling for sales in the higher reaches of the French car market, a total of 3,999 Peugeot 601s produced during just eighteen months was a reasonable production volume for a 6-cylinder car.

== Discontinuation ==
The 601 was taken out of production in 1935 after a production run lasting approximately eighteen months, leaving a gap at the higher end of Peugeot's range, which would be filled only 40 years later with the arrival of the Peugeot 604. The 604 was also the next Peugeot car with an engine having more than four cylinders; the 601 was the final straight-6-engined Peugeot, as the 604 was powered with a V6.

the French reference : www.601.fr
