= Peugeot 401 =

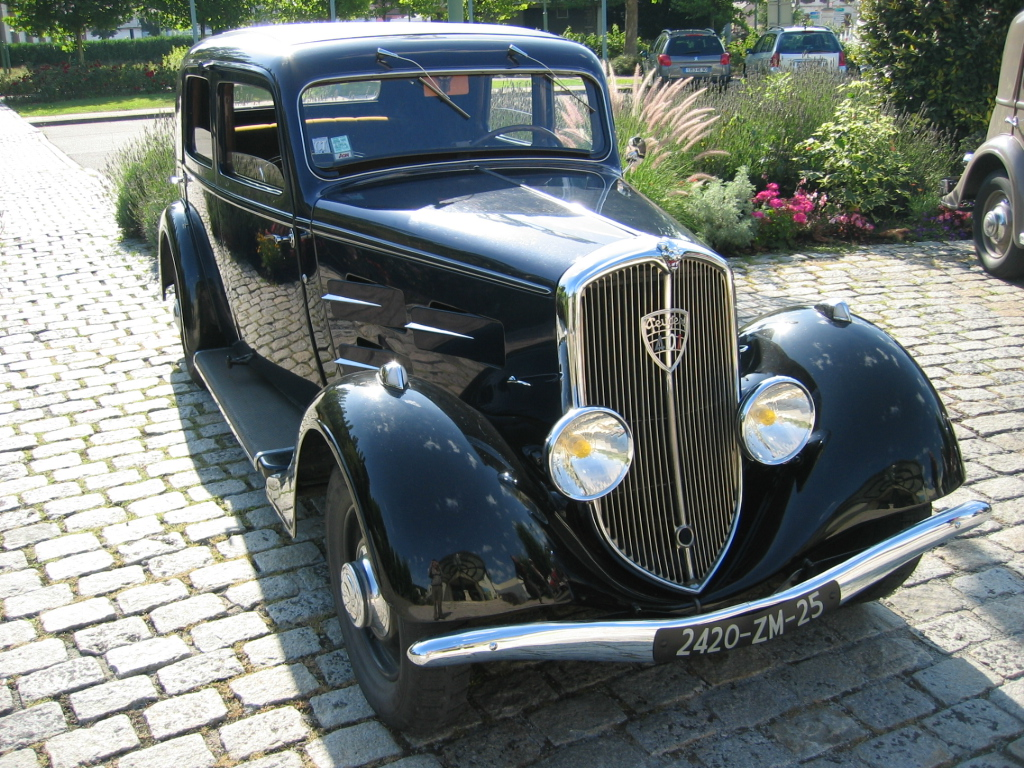

Overview
- Manufacturer: Peugeot
- Production: 1934–1935; 13,545 produced

Body and chassis
- Class: Family car
- Layout: FR layout

Powertrain
- Engine: 1.7 L I4

Chronology
- Predecessor: Peugeot Type 176
- Successor: Peugeot 402

The Peugeot 401 is a mid-size model from Peugeot produced in 1934 and 1935. It was introduced at the October 1934 Paris Motor Show and was again on display at the 29th Paris Show of 1935.

It featured in a full page newspaper advertisement placed by Peugeot in "L'Argus" on 10 October 1935, and disappeared from the manufacturer's price list only three months later, at the start of 1936, reflecting the need to dispose of an inventory backlog. Production of the 401 had already come to an end in August 1935, less than a year after the model's introduction.

The limited production Peugeot 401 Eclipse, introduced in 1934, was the first series produced car to be built (by Carrosserie Pourtout) as a coupé-convertible, with a retractable hardtop that could be moved and stowed under a reverse-hinged rear luggage lid.

== Details ==
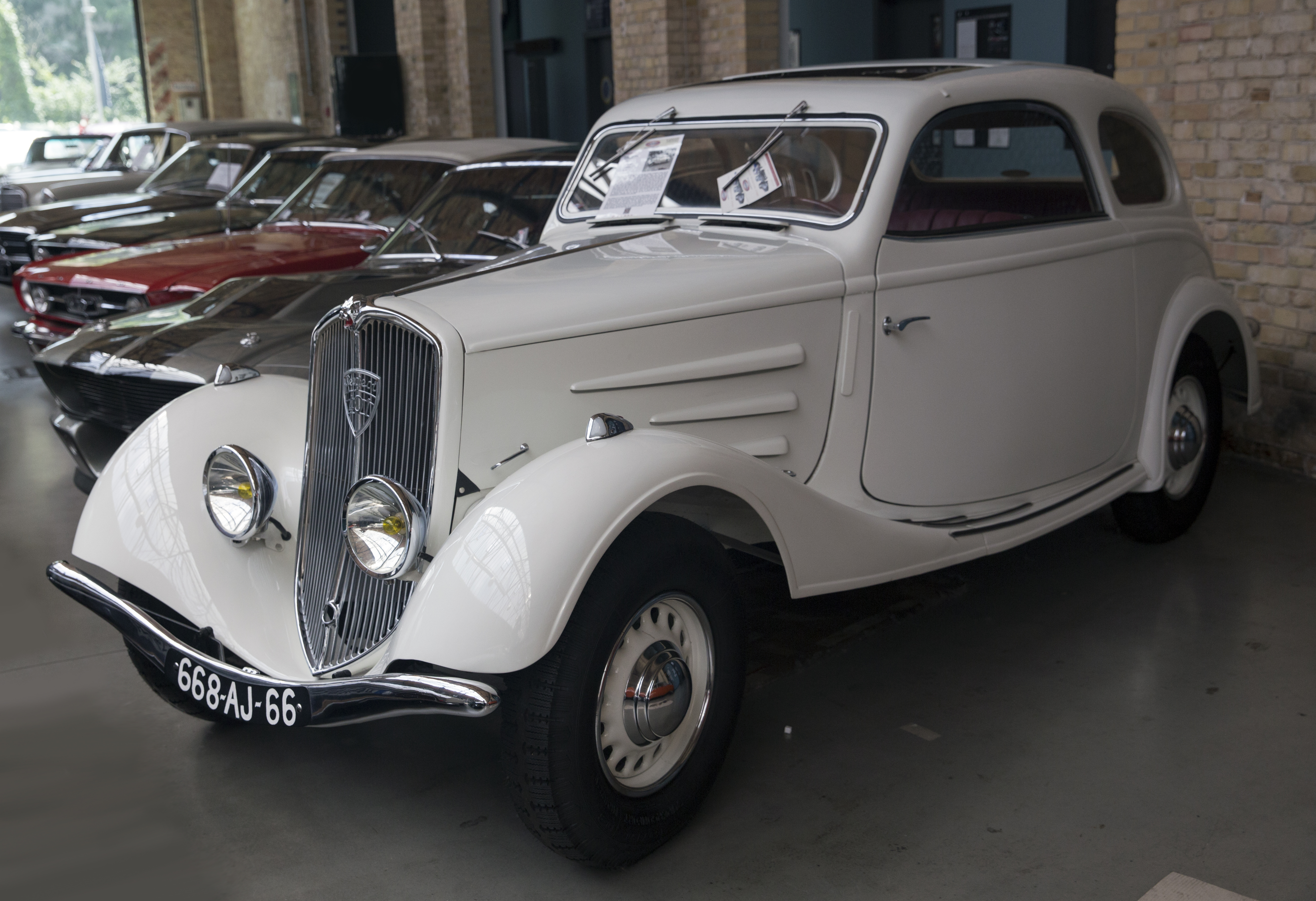
1935 Peugeot 401 D Coach Coupé by Meulemeester, one of only 70 built in this bodystyle

The 401 was powered by an enlarged version of the engine from the smaller Peugeot 301 and slotted between that model and the range-topping 601. The 401's four cylinder side-valve engine displaced 1,720 cc and produced 44 horsepower (33 kW) at 3,500 rpm.

Models of the 401 include the 401 D, 401 DL, and 401 DLT. Though the majority were made as sedans, the 401 was offered with no fewer than eleven different body styles.

== Eclipse ==
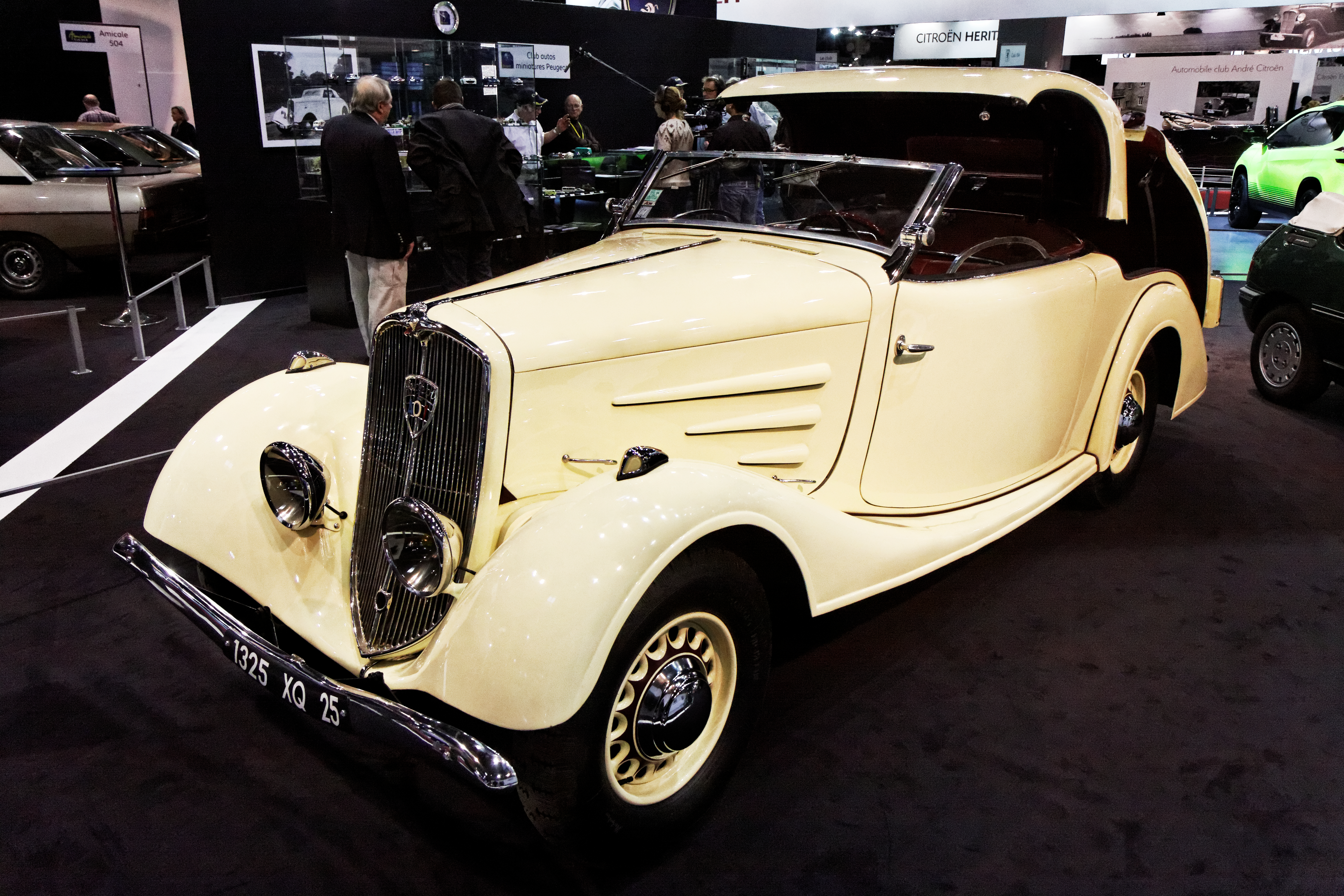
Peugeot 401 Coupé transformable Eclipse

The earliest known example of a retractable hardtop roof dates back to American Ben P. Ellerbeck, who patented such a system in 1922 and installed it on a Hudson Super Six. The Peugeot 401 Eclipse, however, was the first series produced car to incorporate an electric folding metal roof. Peugeot seemed unsure what to call the car – their catalog spoke of both "coupé transformable electrique" and "cabriolet metallique decouvrable" – the system was simply called "Eclipse" by its original inventor and designer Georges Paulin. It was first introduced by Paulin, in collaboration with premier French coachbuilder Pourtout, on the 401D.

The Eclipse was built on a standard Peugeot model 401D's chassis. It ranks as both the longest and lowest of the 401 models:
184 in (4.67 m) long and just under 60 in (1.52 m) tall, weighing 2,851 lb (1,293 kg). The 401D 1,720 cc (105 cu in) straight four engine was rated at 12 taxable horsepower, roughly the equivalent of 50 to 60 horsepower, enough to propel the Eclipse to about 100 km/h (62 mph). A total of 79 Peugeot 401 Eclipses were made. Pourtout and Paulin also built Eclipse coaches of the 301 and 601, on chassis provided by Paris Peugeot-dealer Darl'mat.

== Replacement ==
The all-steel bodied Peugeot 402, featuring a style regarded at the time as strikingly futuristic, was announced in October 1935, which coincided with significant price reductions for several of the previous generation of Peugeots, including the 401.
