= Peugeot Type 183 =

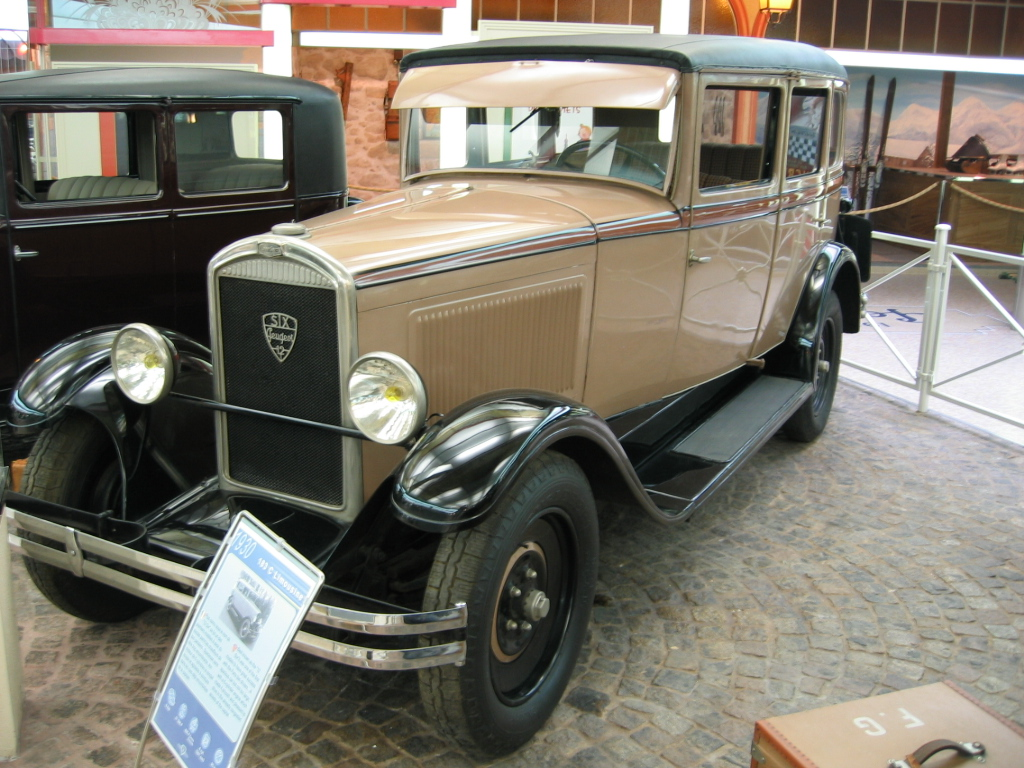
- Peugeot Type 183 at the Peugeot Museum in Sochaux.

Overview
- Manufacturer: Peugeot
- Production: 1928–1932
- Assembly: France: Audincourt

Body and chassis
- Class: family car
- Layout: FR layout

Chronology
- Successor: Peugeot 401; Peugeot 601

The Peugeot Type 183 was a 2-litre six cylinder car produced between 1927 and 1931 by the French auto-maker Peugeot at their Audincourt plant. It was first exhibited at the Paris Motor Show in 1927, but cars only became available for sale in 1928.

France would retain its position as Europe’s leading automobile producer until 1932, and as a significant player Peugeot at this time offered a range of small, medium-sized and large cars. Nevertheless, the 183 marked Peugeot’s return to the two litre sedan/saloon class after an absence of 15 years. The company’s last offering at this level had been the Peugeot Type 143, discontinued in 1912.

The Type 183’s six cylinder 1,991 cc engine delivered a claimed 38 PS on the "base" 183 model and 183 A, 42 hp on the more powerful 183 C and 47 hp on the 183 D. The engine was mounted ahead of the driver and power was delivered to the rear wheels.

The 183 and 183 A models came with a 2992 mm wheelbase, supporting an overall length of 4580 mm and a width of 1600 mm. Several body forms were offered including a saloon/sedan and a "torpedo" which could seat up to seven people, while even the cabriolet version was able to accommodate four or five people. The car's roomy interior made the 183 a favourite with the Paris taxi trade.

By the time the car was delisted, in 1932, 12,636 had been produced. Setting a path that the company’s marketeers would often follow in the decades to come, the Type 183 was replaced not by a car in the same class, but by two models of which one, the 1.7-litre Peugeot 401, could be seen as half a class down and the other, the 2.2 litre Peugeot 601, was half a class up.
