= Georges Paulin =

French automobile designer

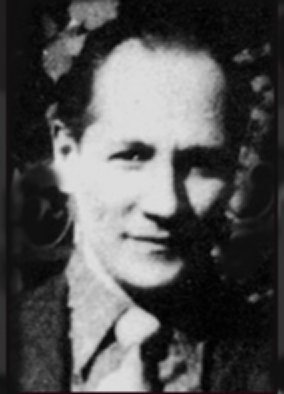
Georges Paulin, ca. 1940

Georges Paulin (French pronunciation: [ʒɔʁʒ polɛ̃]; 20 May 1902 - 21 March 1942) was a French Jewish dentist, automobile designer and coachwork stylist. He died a hero of the French Resistance during World War II.

Born 1902 in a working class section of Paris, Paulin was a pioneer of aerodynamic design and coachbuilding, with his most notable innovation being the world's first production retractable hardtop system, which he dubbed 'Eclipse'. In 1934, a Peugeot 401D Coupé transformable Eclipse, with coachwork by Carrosserie Pourtout, designed by Paulin, on a chassis provided by prominent Peugeot dealer Darl'mat, became the world's first coupé-convertible. In 1935, Peugeot purchased Paulin's patent, and the Peugeot 402 Eclipse, with Paulin's roof design and system, became the world's first factory production, power retractable, hardtop convertible car.

Paulin worked as lead designer and stylist for leading French coachbuilder Pourtout from 1933 to 1938, and then worked for Rolls-Royce-Bentley, designing amongst others the 1938 Embiricos Derby Bentley (B27LE), and the 1939 Bentley Corniche prototype.

In 1940, once World War II had begun, Paulin became a spy for the British. He was, however, betrayed, and arrested by Nazi Germans in 1941, and executed in 1942. He was posthumously awarded the Croix de Guerre and the Médaille de la Résistance by the French government.

== From dentist to inventor and auto designer ==
The first Eclipse roofed cars, 1934

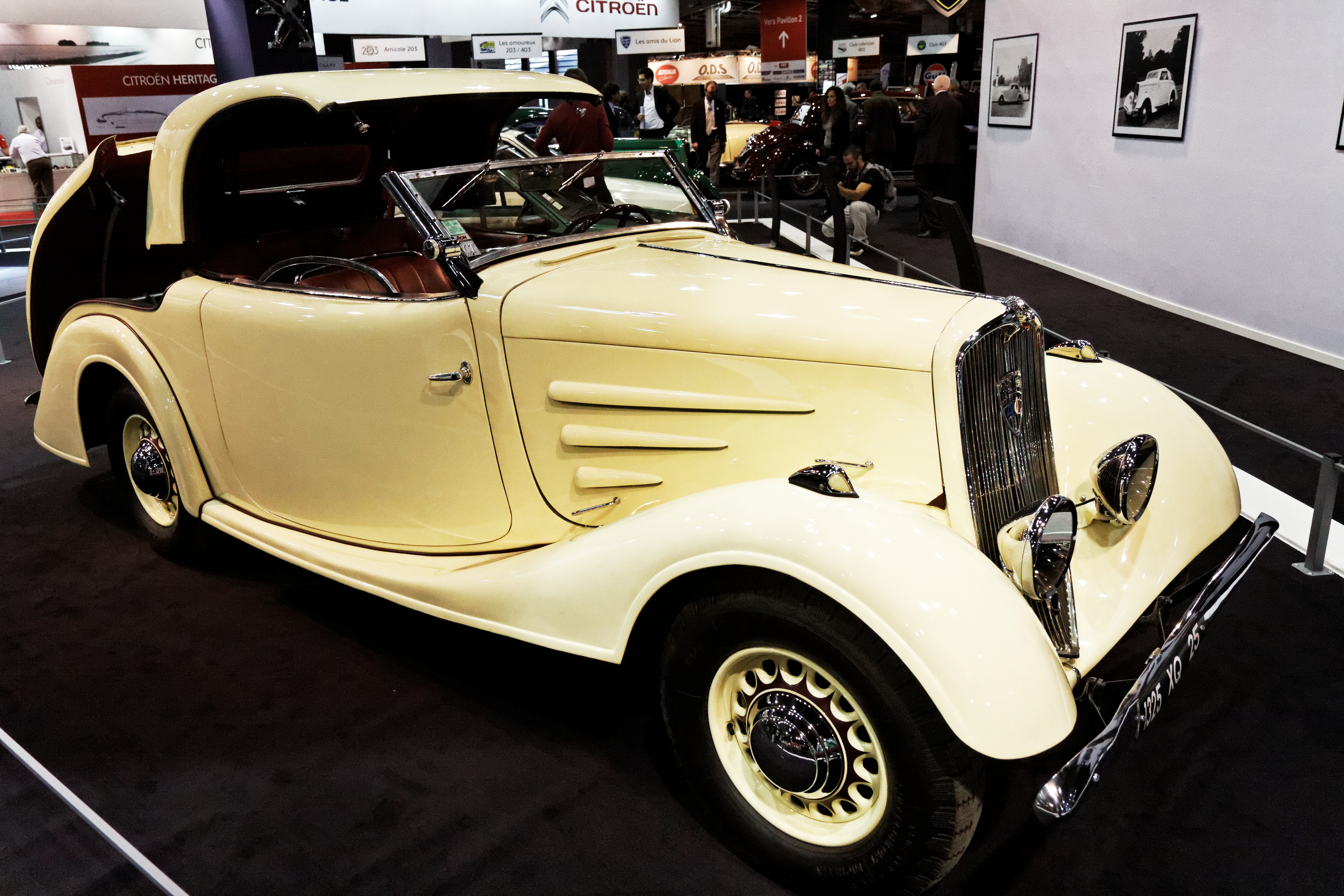
1934 Peugeot 401D Coupé transformable Eclipse (Pourtout)

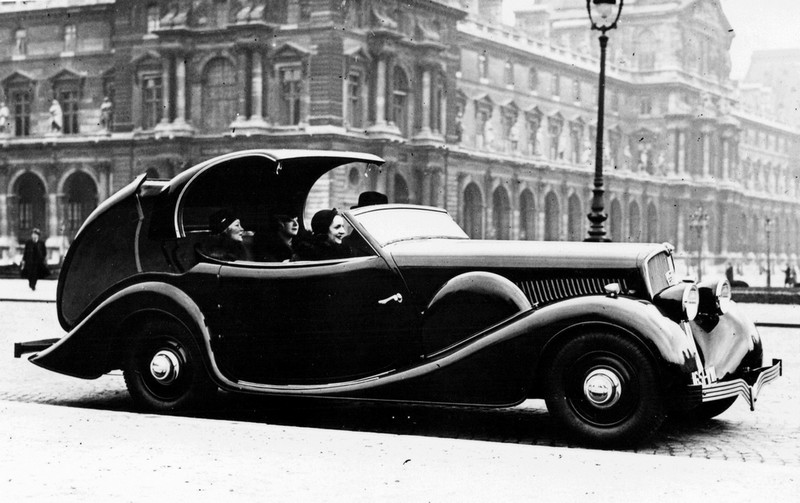
1934 Peugeot 601 C Eclipse

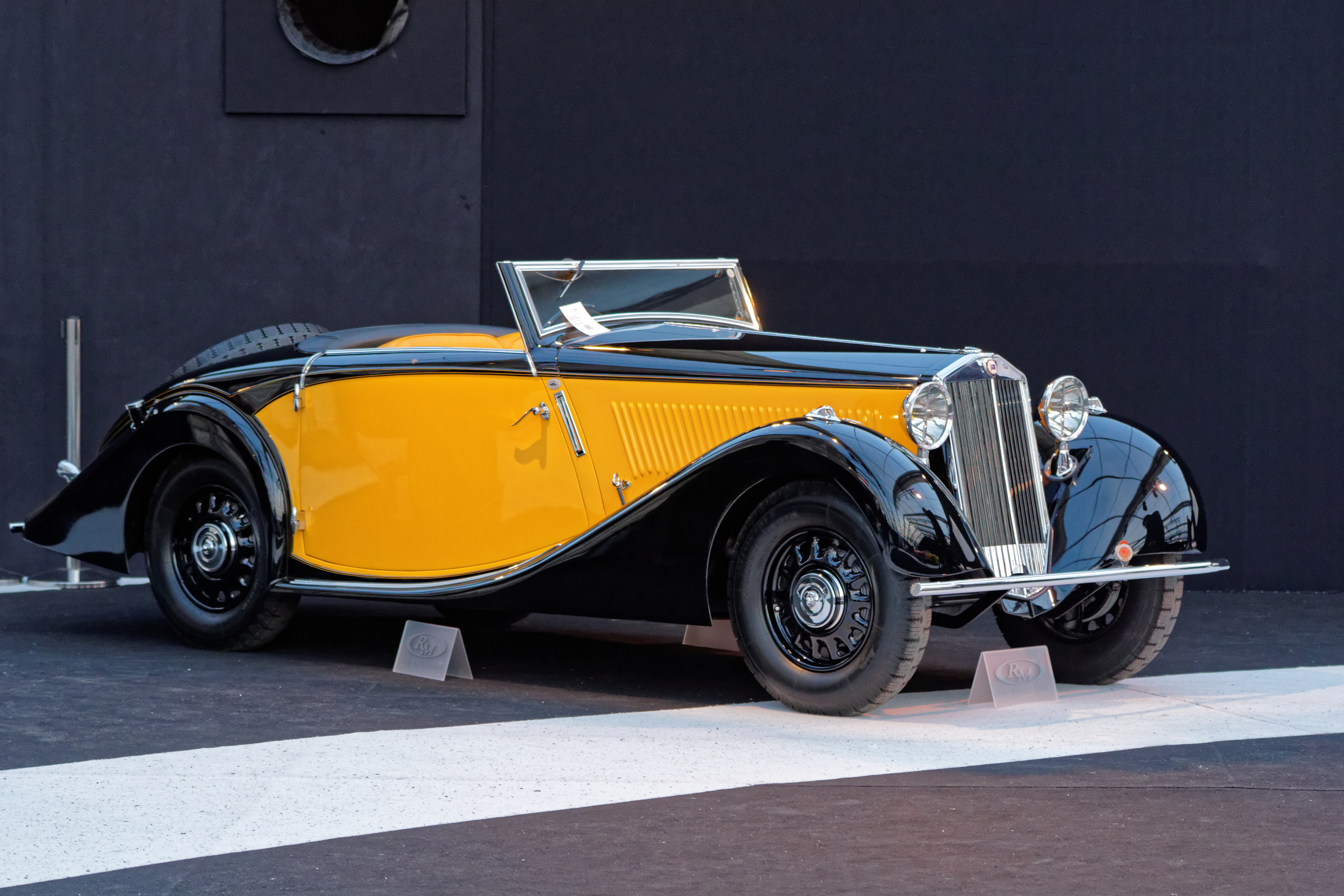
1934 Lancia Belna Eclipse

In 1925 or 1927, while looking out the window of his dental practice during a major downpour, Paulin saw a Delage driver wrestle in vain to get his soft-top up, before the rain destroyed its expensive interior. His neighbor's mishap got Paulin thinking about a retractable hardtop roof that could quickly and easily be erected or stowed.

With support and collaboration of a friend who was a mechanical engineer, he started developing his revolutionary idea of a convertible car design with a reverse-hinged rear deck-lid, under which an elegantly styled, low and aerodynamic, coupé-type roof could be mechanically moved and stowed. Paulin made his idea known, and applied for a patent in 1931, and despite the expenses and complexities of the French patent system, received patent number 733.380 on 5 July 1932.

Paulin presented his 'Eclipse' convertible roof system to one of France's premier custom coachbuilders, Marcel Pourtout, who was impressed by the design – both its style, aerodynamics, as well as the mechanics, in which the roof was counterbalanced by a pair of long elastic bands. Being manually operated, the simple top could be manipulated, to raise or lower, by one man.

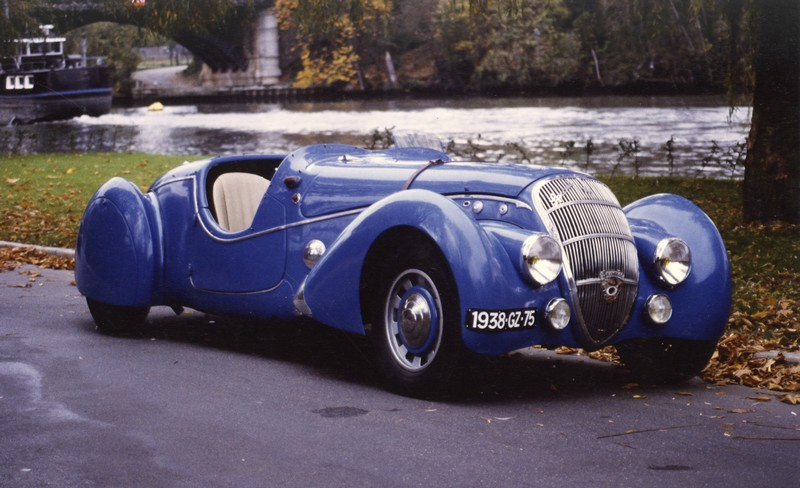
1938 Peugeot 302 Sport "Darl'Mat"

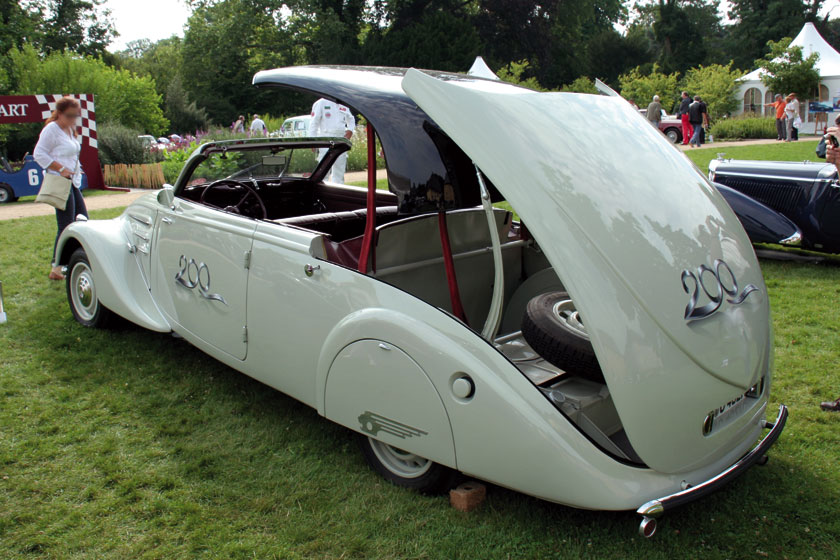
1935 introduced Peugeot factory-built 402 Eclipse Decapotable (1938)

When Pourtout got an order in 1933, to build a custom coach on a Hotchkiss Coupé chassis, he saw the first opportunity to apply Paulin's Eclipse roof system. Financial disagreement however led to aborting the first Eclipse build. Paulin nevertheless became the chief designer / stylist for Pourtout, and left his dental practice. Until 1938, the two men created designs for various brands, including Bentley, a Delage D8, a French-built Lancia, a Panhard coupe, a Unic cabriolet, the "water drop" Talbot-Lago, and the Darl'mat provided Peugeot roadsters used in 1937 and 1938 at Le Mans.

Emile Darl'mat was a premier Paris Peugeot-dealer with his own car body business, who gained prominence as a low volume manufacturer of Peugeot-based sports cars in the 1930s. Darl’mat was very enthusiastic, and kept collaborating with Pourtout and Paulin in creating the revolutionary Eclipse roof, the first power-operated retractable hardtop. Paulin and Pourtout created a second prototype on a Peugeot frame provided by Darl’mat, and they subsequently launched small-scale production, based on Peugeot's 401 and 601, modified by Pourtout.

In 1934 it was first presented in the form of the 401D Éclipse Décapotable, a low convertible coupe. Until World War II, Paulin and Carrosserie Pourtout produced Eclipse versions of the Peugeot 301, 401, 601, 302 and 402, the Lancia Belna, and models from Hotchkiss and Panhard.

Richard Adatto, author of a book on French aerodynamic styling of the era, wrote:

"Paulin became the leading French stylist of the time... Everything he touched was designed with aerodynamics in mind. He was very conscious of fuel efficiencies and the aerodynamic efficiencies that could be created by the lines of the car. You could go faster, which meant you could put a smaller engine in the car and it could go faster even though it was a small car."

In 1935, Paulin sold his retractable hardtop design and patent to Peugeot, and Paulin proposed a new system for the 302 and 402 Eclipse which remains notable, for the retractable hardtop does not encroach upon the volume of the trunk. Once Peugeot launched the 402, they were free to manufacture a version with Paulin's Eclipse retractable hardtop themselves. Again, Paulin had a financial disagreement, and sued Peugeot, but they now owned the patent on the design, and Paulin lost the lawsuit. Until World War II, Peugeot built some 470 of the 402BL Éclipse Décapotable, of which ~30 survive, according to research by Raymond Milo, a Los Angeles dealer in collectible European cars. In the words of Milo:

“The Éclipse was a milestone design and perhaps the most attractive example of Art Deco design applied to automobile coachwork, ..”

Auction house Sotheby's called the Eclipse top, for its simplicity and swiftness of operation, superior compared to the later, mechanised hardtop of the late 1950s Ford Fairlane 500 / Galaxy Skyliner retractable. The New York Times estimated the value of a well restored Peugeot 402BL Éclipse at $250,000 in 2006. In early 2015, the 1934 Lancia Belna Eclipse by Pourtout sold for €212,800 including fees by Sotheby's of Paris.

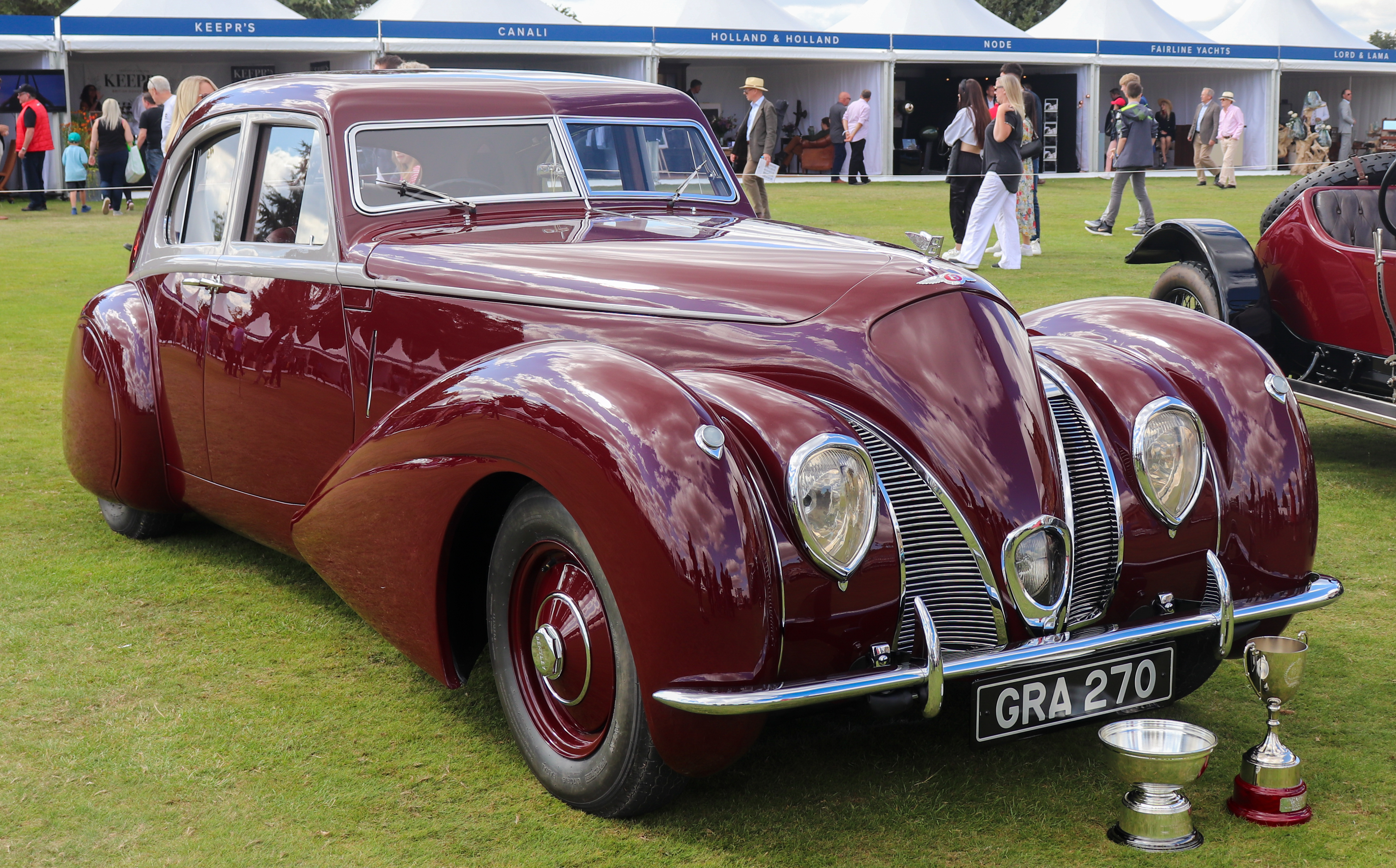
1939 Bentley Corniche prototype recreation

Fifteen years after Paulin's death, the 1957 Ford Fairlane 500 / Galaxy Skyliner became the first car with a retractable hardtop to be built in large numbers, and was also the first to feature a hardtop split into more than one segment.
Only after the success of the late 1990s Mercedes SLK retracting convertible, did Peugeot reprise Paulin's invention, with the Peugeot 206CC.

== From Carrosserie Pourtout to Rolls-Royce-Bentley ==
From 1938 to 1939, Paulin worked exclusively for Rolls-Royce-Bentley. For them he designed the (Bentley) Corniche I in 1939, and the Comet Competition.

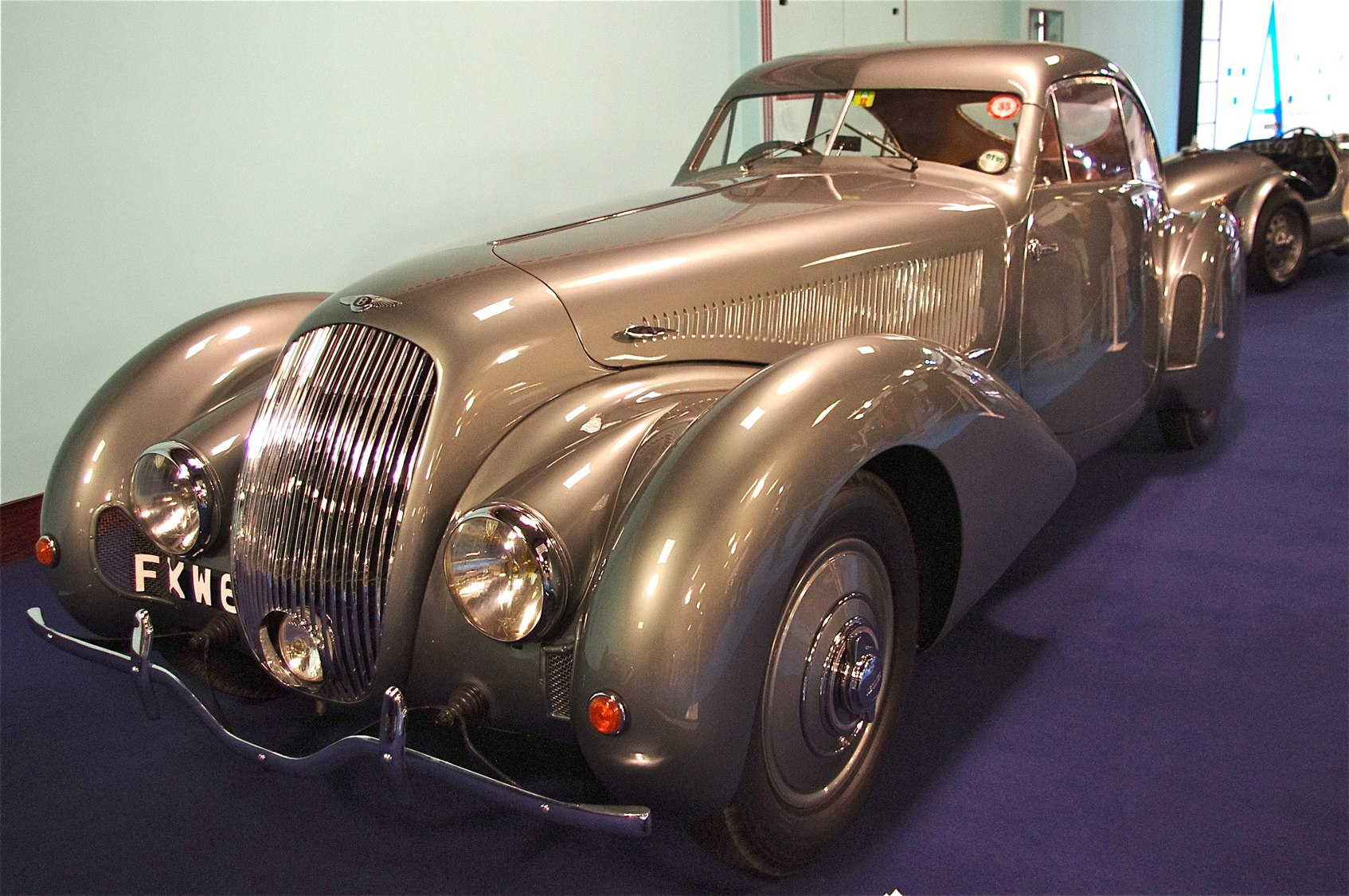
1938 Bentley 4¼ Litre "Embiricos"

Additionally, he designed one of the most significant pre-war Derby Bentleys, the Embiricos Bentley B27LE, built again by Pourtout. This car departed from standard Bentley practice, by not using the standard Bentley grille, in favor of hiding it behind a streamlined grille. Amazingly this car was entered in the 1949 Le Mans 24 heures du Mans where it finished 6th overall and entered the two subsequent races finishing 14th and 22nd, with over 120,000 miles on the odometer.

From an automobile, purchased in 1993, and initially restored as a 100-point chassis, Gary Moore from California created a roadster, based upon Paulin's design B25GP, hoping to display it next to its predecessor at Pebble Beach in 2019, Bentley's centennial. This automobile took over 14 years to complete with some of California's master craftsman weighing in with buck fabrication, metalwork, chrome and interior finishing.

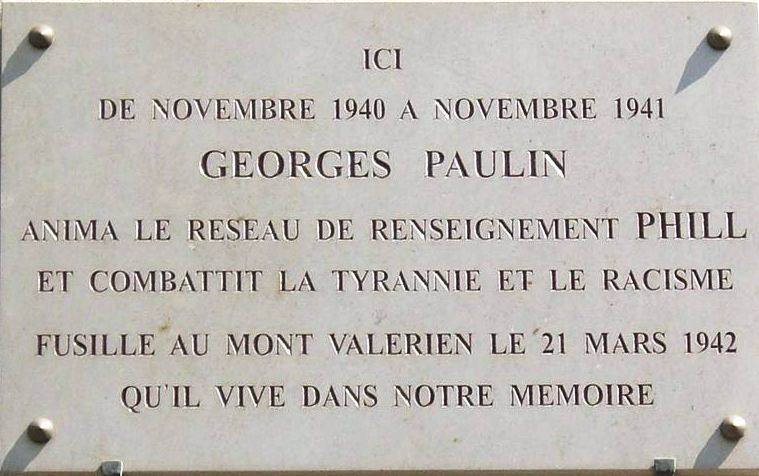
Georges Paulin dedicated plaque

== World War II resistance ==
In July 1940, while he was an engineer at Avions Kellner-Béchereau, Georges Paulin began for the Alibi network for British Intelligence to fight the Nazis. Discovered by the Gestapo, betrayed by French Vichy elements, he was arrested in 1941 and sentenced to death by a German military tribunal. He was executed March 1942. An escape plan had been arranged by the British, but Paulin declined to use it, and sacrificed himself in order to protect his team.

He was posthumously awarded the Croix de Guerre and the Médaille de la Résistance by the French government.
