= Lancia Augusta =

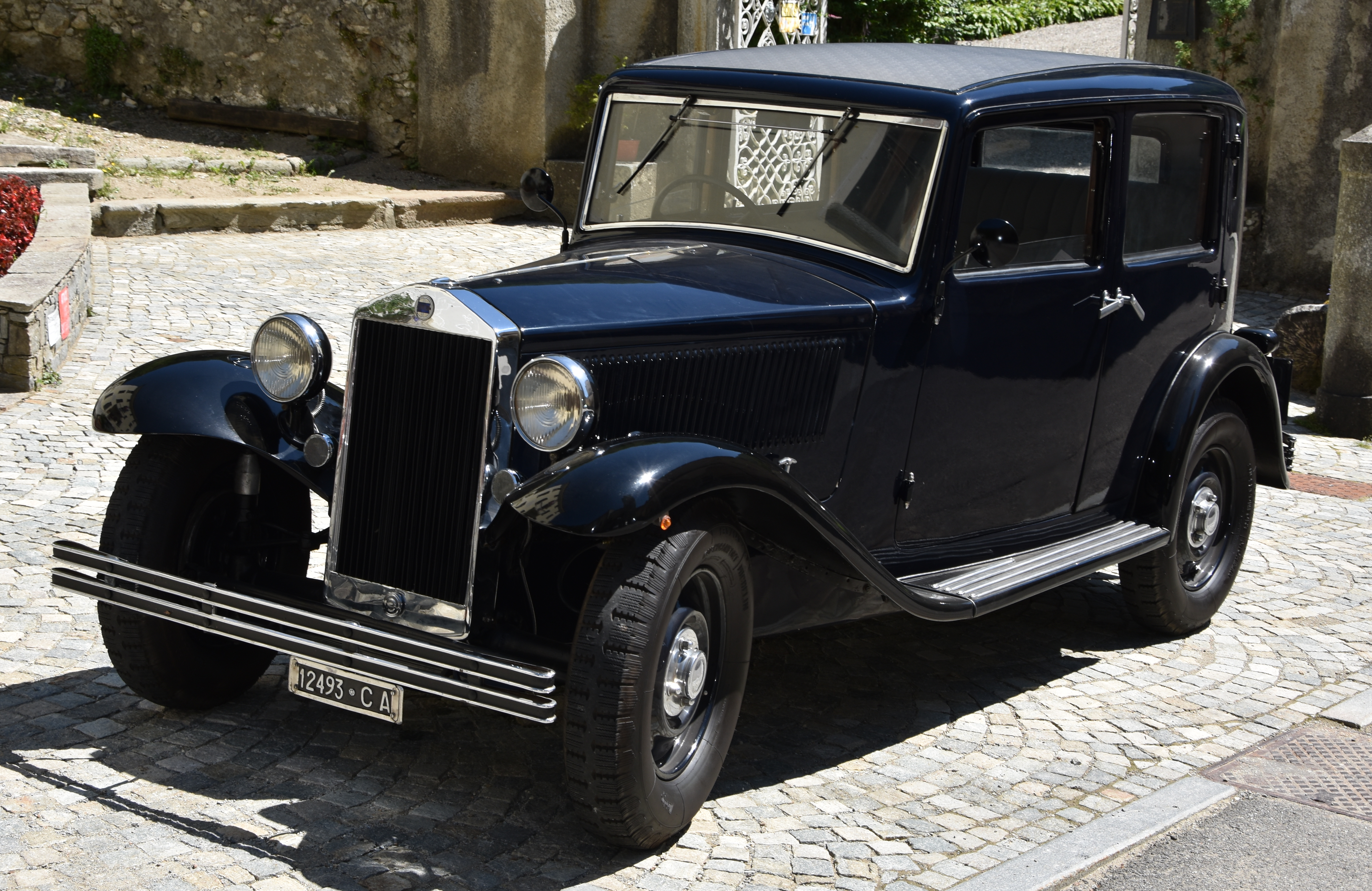
- 1934 Lancia Augusta

Overview
- Manufacturer: Lancia
- Also called: Lancia Belna
- Production: 1933–1936; 17,217 vehicles

Body and chassis
- Body style: 4-door saloon 2-door cabriolet
- Layout: Front-engine, rear-wheel-drive

Powertrain
- Engine: 1,196 cc Lancia V4
- Transmission: 4-speed manual

Dimensions
- Wheelbase: 265 cm (104.3 in)
- Kerb weight: 850 kg (1,874 lb)

Chronology
- Successor: Lancia Ardea

The Lancia Augusta is a small passenger car produced by Italian car manufacturer Lancia between 1933 and 1936. It made its première at the 1932 Paris Motor Show. The car was powered by a 1,196 cc Lancia V4 engine.

During the 1920s, Lancia had been known as producers of sports cars and middle sized sedans: the smaller Augusta represented a departure from that tradition, and contributed to a significant growth in Lancia's unit sales during the 1930s. Nevertheless, in terms of volumes sold, the Augusta was overwhelmed by Fiat's much more aggressively priced 508 Ballila.

== Lancia Belna ==
Lancia started its French operations on 1 October 1931. At its first factory outside of Italy, at Bonneuil-sur-Marne, Lancia built the Augusta and later Aprilia models, although named them Belna and Ardennes. Approximately 3,000 Augusta/Belna and 1,500 Aprilia/Ardennes were built.

Of the approximately 3,000 Bellas built between 1934 and 1938, 2,500 were saloons and 500 bare chassis.

Georges Paulin had invented the retractable hardtop and had shown his designs to French coachbuilder Marcel Pourtout. Carrosserie Pourtout built several bodies based on the French-built Lancia Belna.

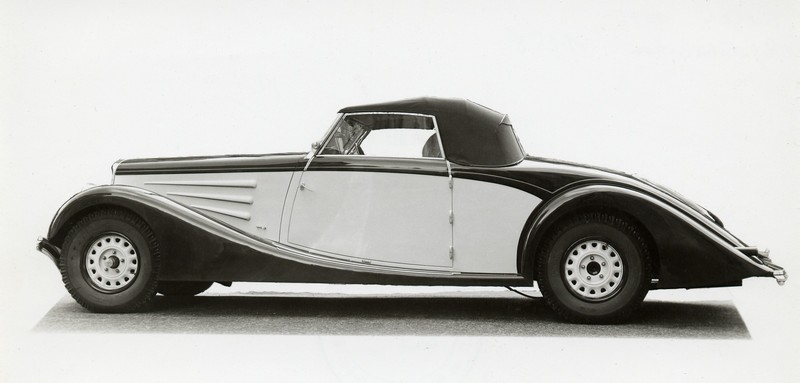
Lancia Belna cabriolet 1935 Pourtout

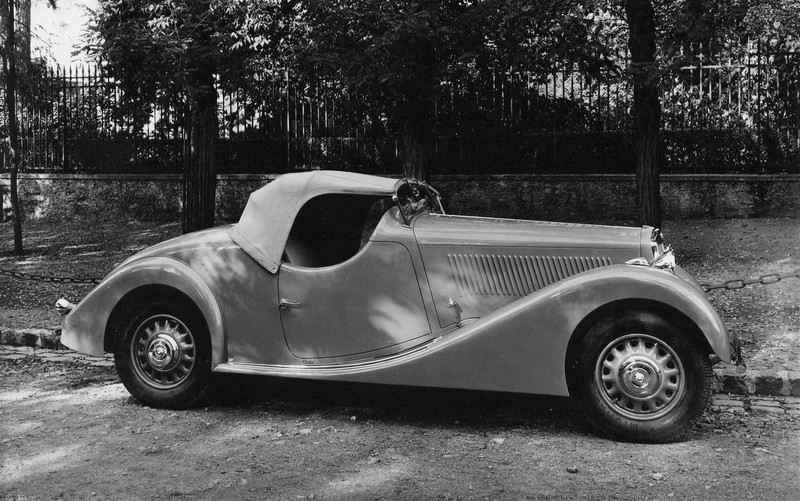
Lancia Belna roadster Pourtout

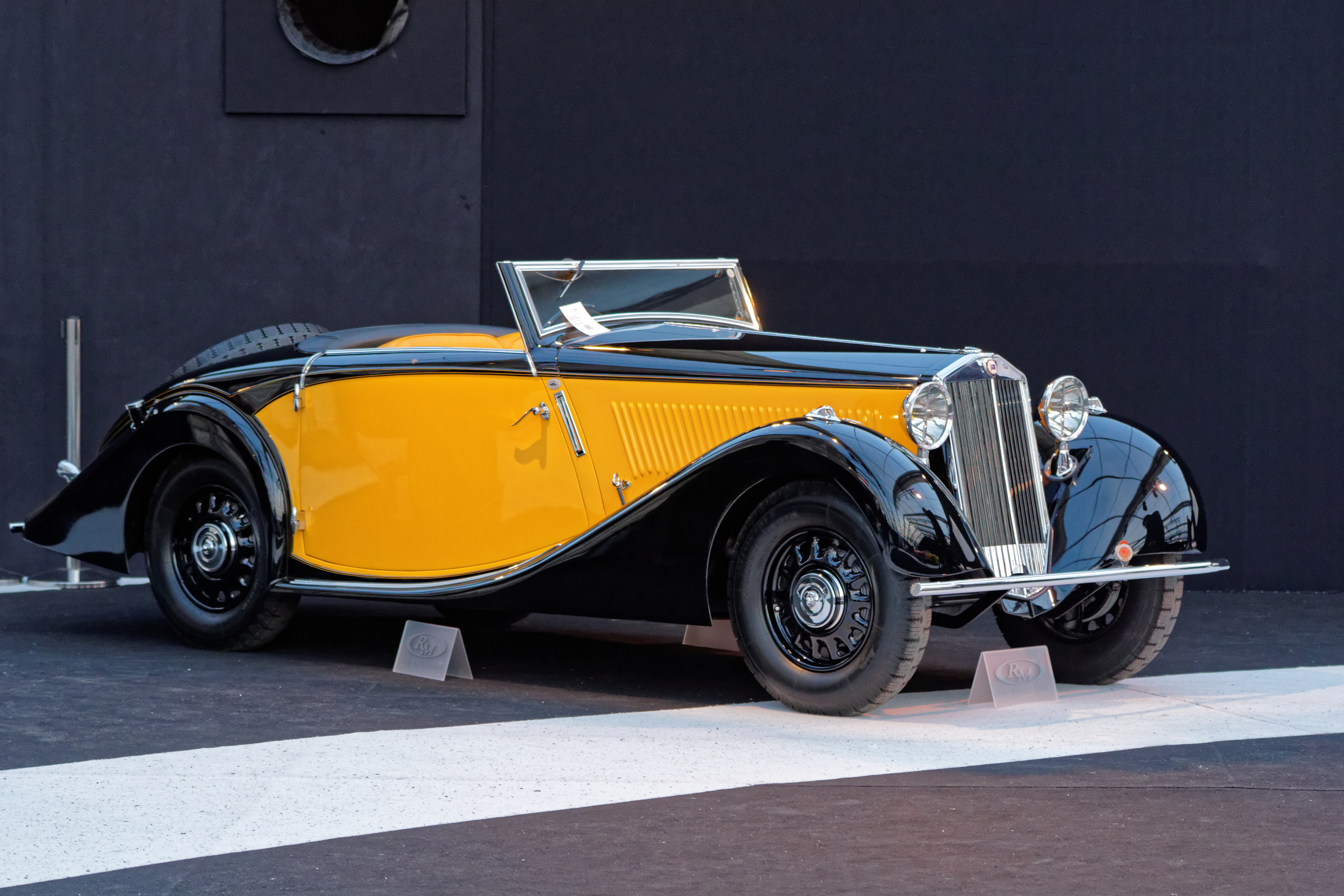
1934 Lancia Belna "Eclipse" coupé-convertible Pourtout

== Bibliography ==
- Frostick, Michael (1976). Lancia. ISBN 0-901564-22-2.
