= Carrosserie Pourtout =

French coachbuilding company

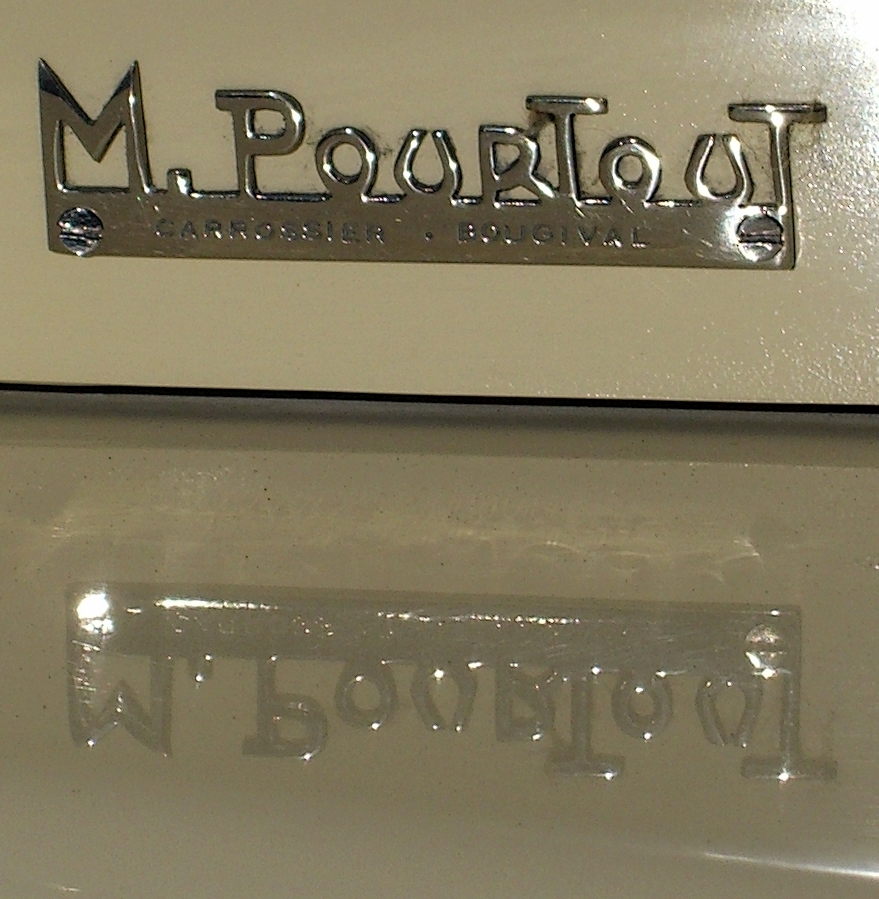
Pourtout nameplate on a 1927 Georges Irat Model A

Carrosserie Pourtout was a French coachbuilding company. Founded by Marcel Pourtout in 1925, the firm is best known for its work in the decades prior to World War II, when it created distinctive and prestigious bodies for cars from numerous European manufacturers. Pre-war Pourtout bodies were mainly one-off, bespoke creations, typically aerodynamic and sporting in character. Together with chief coach designer and stylist Georges Paulin from 1933 to 1938, Pourtout pioneered the Paulin invented 'Eclipse' retractable hardtop system on four models of Peugeot, several Lancia Belna's and other car makes.
Among the company's customers was Georges Clemenceau, the physician and journalist who served as the prime minister of France from 1906 to 1909 and 1917 to 1920.

The firm later turned to designs for industry and public transport.

Carrosserie Pourtout ceased its creative operations in 1994 but survives to the present day as a vehicle body repair shop.

== Before and during World War II ==
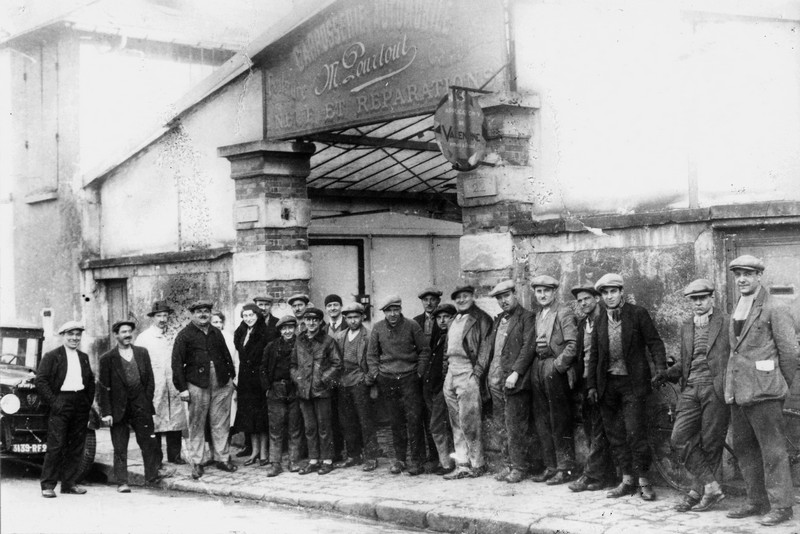
Staff outside Carrosserie Pourtout's Bougival coachworks, Marcel Pourtout fourth from left

Marcel Pourtout started in 1925 with a small workshop in Bougival and a workforce of twelve. His wife Henriette looked after the firm’s finances. Hard work and plentiful orders allowed repayment of Carrosserie Pourtout’s start-up loans in just a few years, and in 1928 the premises were enlarged.

In 1936 Pourtout expanded again, taking over the Hurtu factory workshops in Rueil-Malmaison. Here the staff, which then numbered fifteen, could produce small production runs of coachwork, in addition to the one-offs.

Until World War II, Carrosserie Pourtout's creations were exhibited at the annual Salon de l'Automobile de Paris.

At the beginning of the war, before France fell to the Germans, the firm made ambulances on Chevrolet chassis.

In 1941 Marcel Pourtout was appointed Mayor of Rueil-Malmaison (Hauts-de-Seine) in 1941, as it was customary at the time to choose someone who headed a business. (He held the post until 1944; and again from 1947 to 1971.)

In 1942 the occupying forces requisitioned Pourtout's workshops, partially demolishing them when they left. Also in 1942 the Nazis executed the firm's prewar designer, Georges Paulin (see below), as a member of the French Resistance and an agent of British Intelligence.

== Collaboration with Emile Darl'mat and Georges Paulin ==
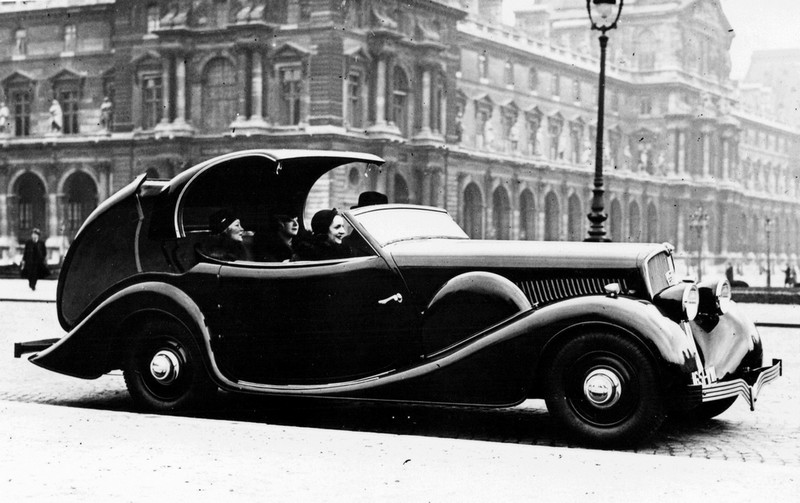
Pourtout-bodied 1934 Peugeot 601 C Eclipse

At the end of 1933 Peugeot’s Paris concessionaire Emile Darl'mat introduced Marcel Pourtout to Georges Paulin, a dentist with a flair for coachwork design. He became Pourtout’s lead designer.

Richard Adatto, author of a book on French aerodynamic styling of the era, has been quoted as saying: "Paulin became the leading French stylist of the time...Everything he touched was designed with aerodynamics in mind. He was very conscious of fuel efficiencies and the aerodynamic efficiencies that could be created by the lines of the car. You could go faster, which meant you could put a smaller engine in the car and it could go faster even though it was a small car."

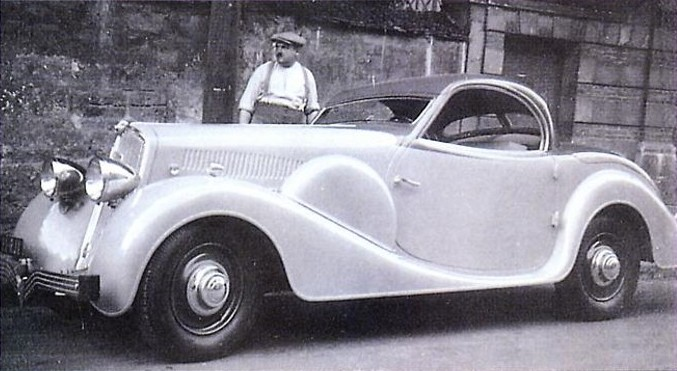
Peugeot 401 Eclipse, Marcel Pourtout standing behind

Pourtout, Darl'mat and Paulin collaborated in the creation of the revolutionary Eclipse roof, a design of retractable hardtop that had a special mechanism, patented in Paulin's name, to stow it out of sight in the car’s boot. Carrosserie Pourtout produced Eclipse versions of the Peugeot 301, 401, 402 and 601, the Lancia Belna, and models from Hotchkiss and Panhard.

For the 1937 24 Hours of Le Mans endurance race Carrosserie Pourtout collaborated with Emile Darl'Mat to create the bodies for three identical cars that utilized modified Peugeot 402 engines in modified 302 chassis. In the 1937 race The Darl'mat Roadsters placed 7th, 8th and 10th overall. They returned the following year, and the entry driven by De Cortanze won the under-2 litre class.

In 1937 and 1938 Carrosserie Pourtout made a road-going version of the Le Mans cars, the Peugeot 402 Darl’Mat "Spécial Sport", which had a total production run of 106.

== Major prewar works ==
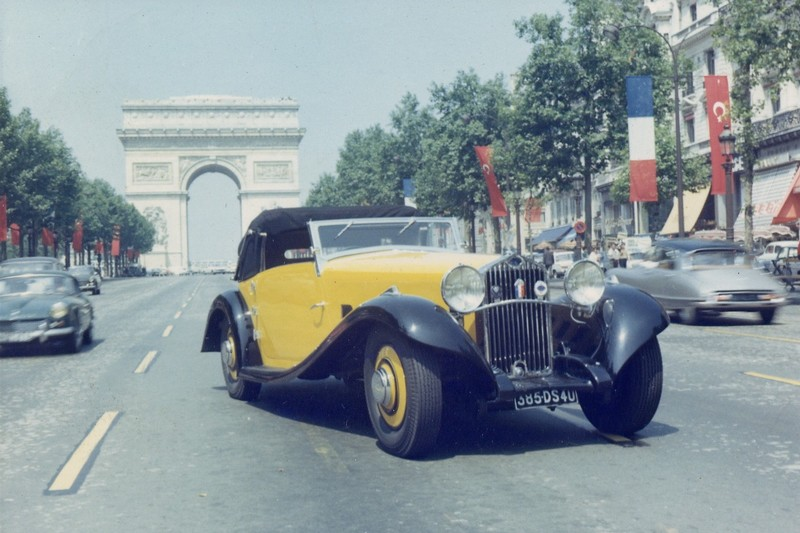
Delage D8S Pourtout

DELAGE

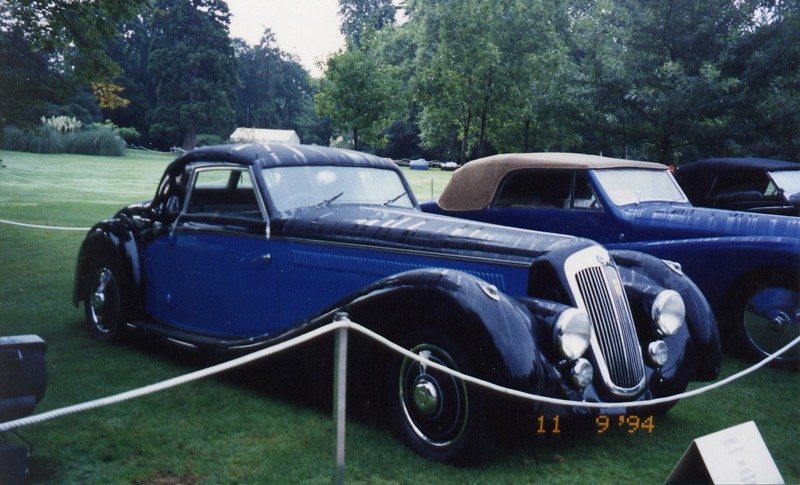
1938 Lancia Astura Pourtout

Type	Dates	Quantity
Types unidentified	1927 to 1939	5
D1 12	January 1937 to November 1937	3
D6 60	January 1937	1
D 6 70	January 1937 to October 1938	31
D 6 75	Oct. 1938 to Sept. 1940	21
D 8 120	October 1937 to October 1938	3

LANCIA

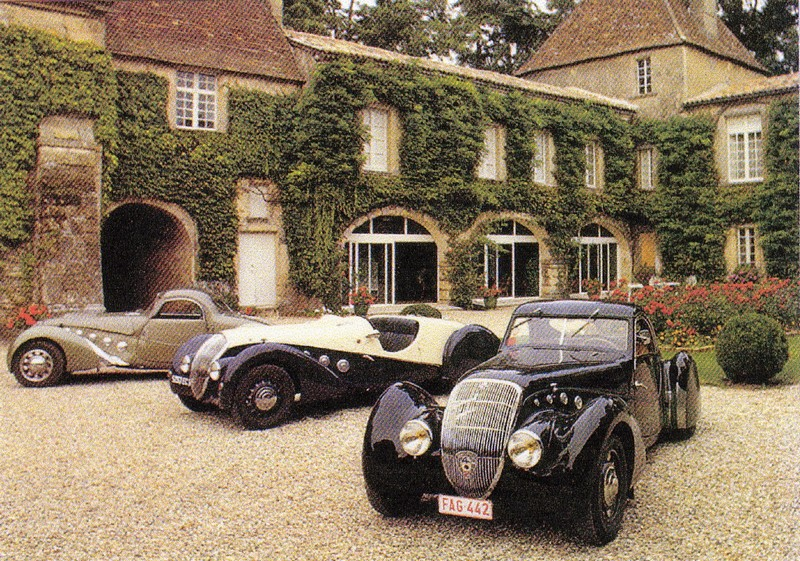
Peugeot Darl'mat Pourtouts

Type	Dates	Quantity
Dilambda	September 1931	2
Belna	December 1934 to April 1937	326 (including 209 convertibles)
Ardennes	September 1937 to July 1939	36
Astura	March 1939	1

PEUGEOT 402 Darl'mat

Type	Dates	Quantity
Roadster	September 1936 to June 1939	54
Cabriolet	September 1937 to June 1939	32
Coupé	June 1937 to August 1938	20

RENAULT Saprar

Type	Dates	Quantity
Primaquatre Sport Roadster	September 1938 to June 1939	10
Primaquatre Sport Cabriolet	March 1939 to July 1939	15
Primaquatre Sport Coach	October 1938	1

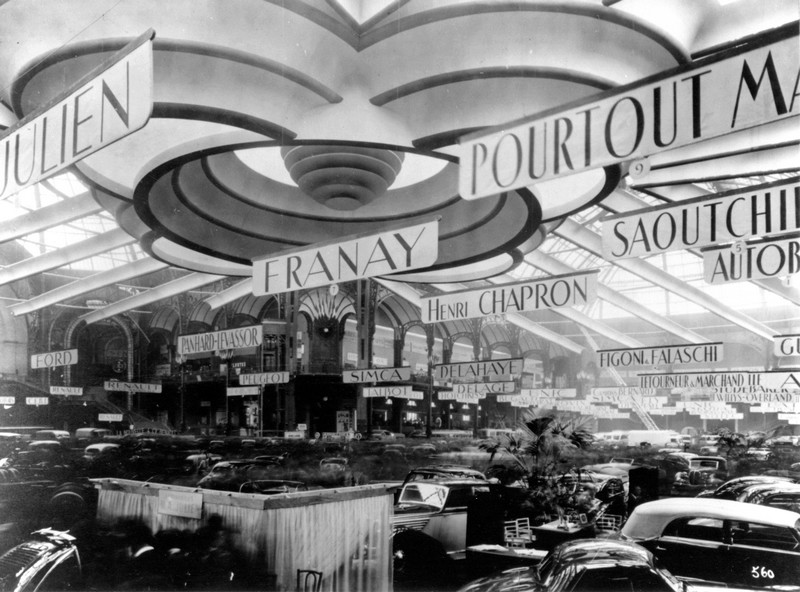
1946 Salon de L'Automobile

== After World War II ==
Notwithstanding the loss of Paulin, Carrosserie Pourtout continued to exhibit at the Salon de l'Automobile from 1947 to 1952, and the firm produced a number of prestigious bodies before Marcel Pourtout and his son Claude turned to projects for industry and advertising.

Altogether, taking into account the firm's work both before and after World War II, Carrosserie Pourtout designed and built bodies on chassis from at least twenty manufacturers, namely: Voisin, Fiat, Hispano-Suiza, Panhard, Hotchkiss, Bugatti, Lorraine, Lancia, Unic, Renault, Peugeot, Bentley, Delage, Delahaye, Buick, Delaunay-Belleville, Talbot-Lago, Healey, Simca and Chrysler.

== Gallery of Pourtout-bodied cars ==
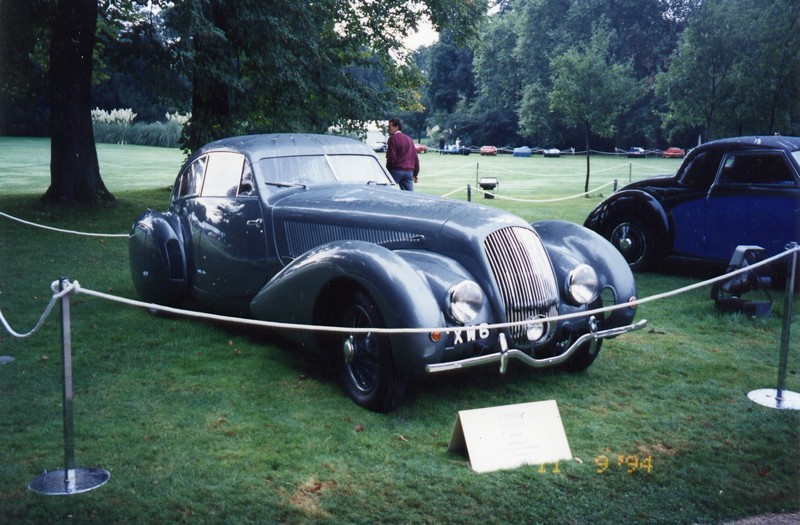
1938 "Embiricos" Bentley

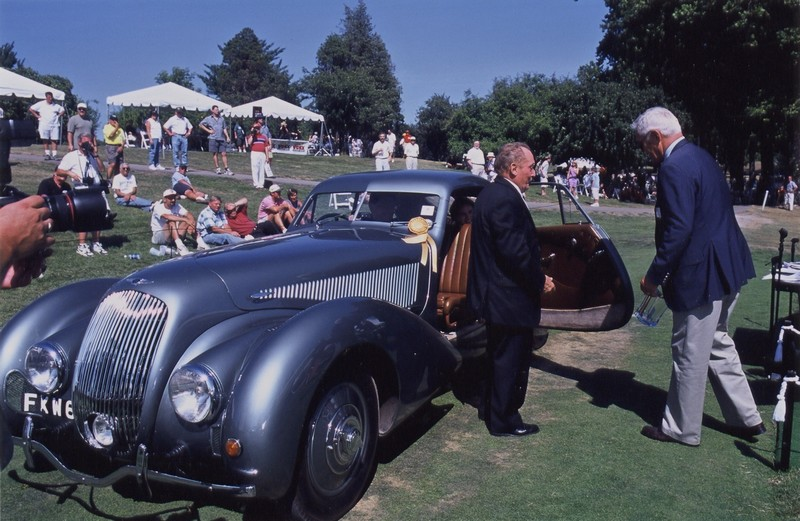
1938 "Embiricos" Bentley

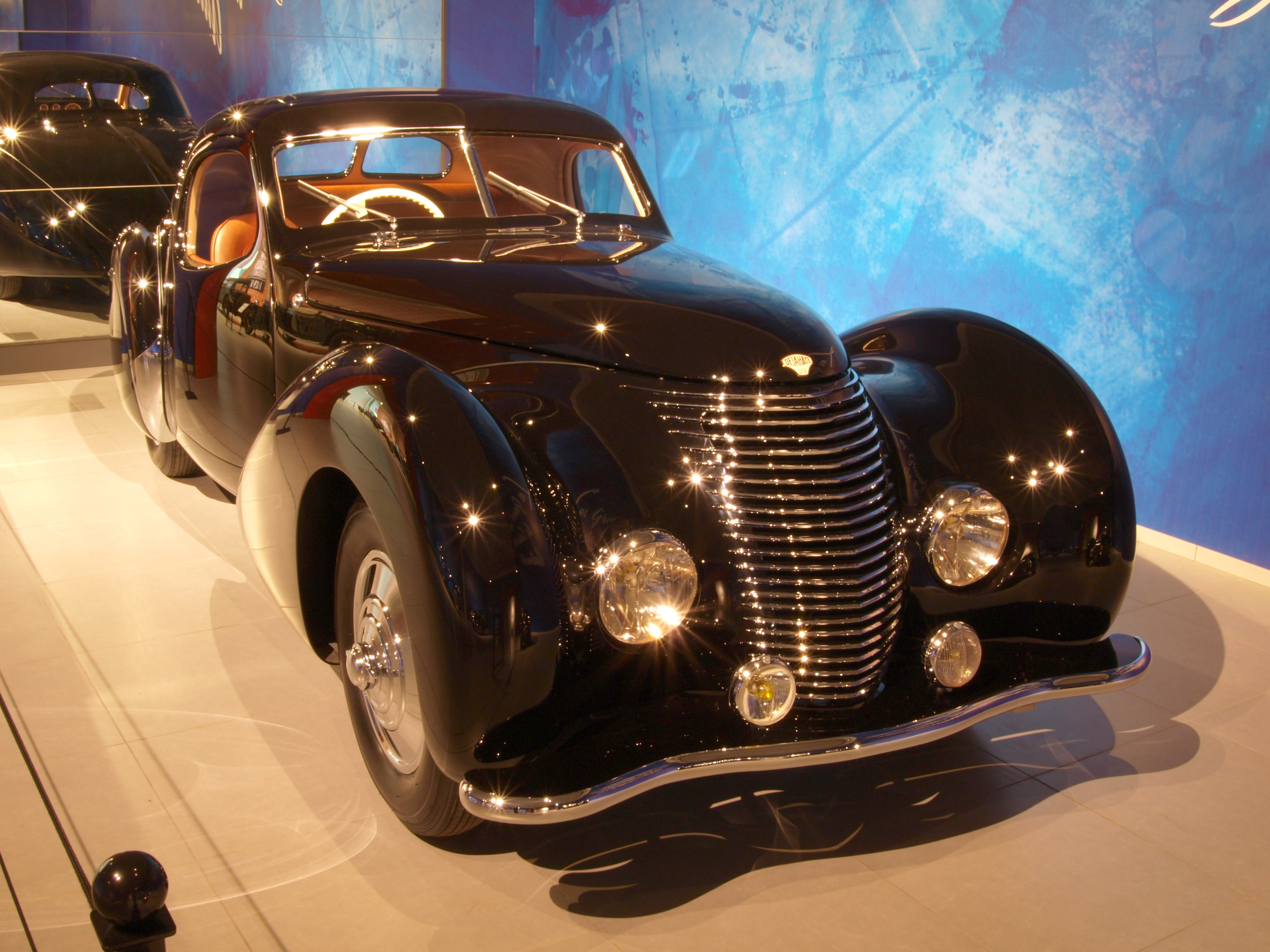
1946 Delahaye 135 MS

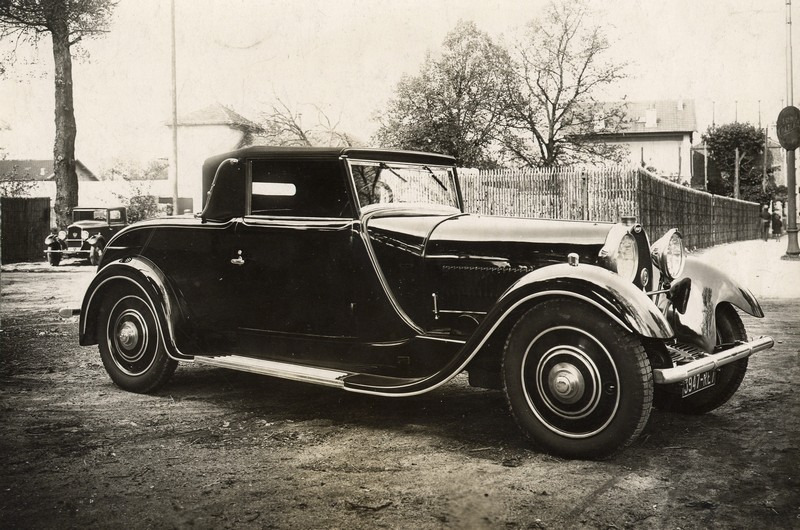
Bugatti

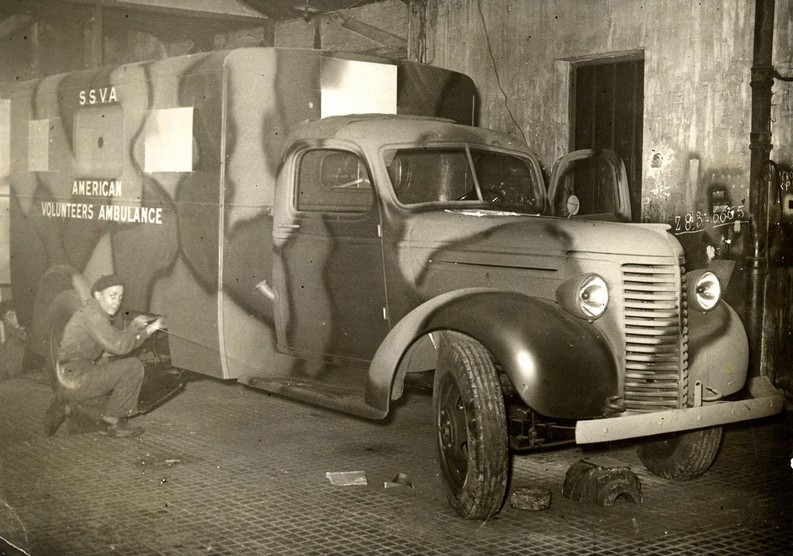
Chevrolet ambulance attended by Pourtout's son Claude

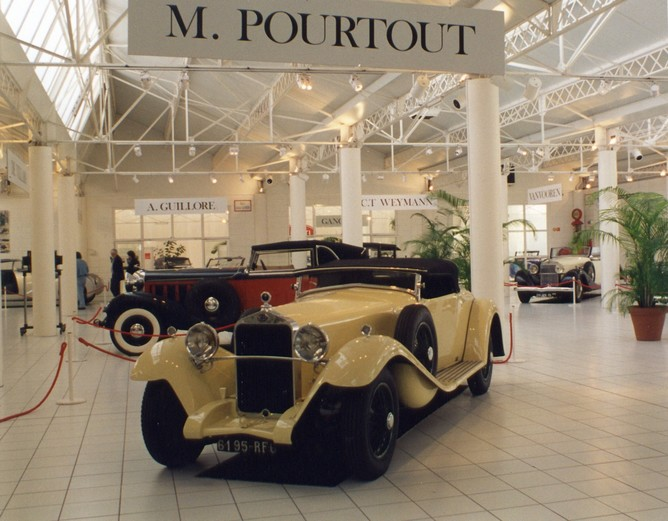
1932 Delage

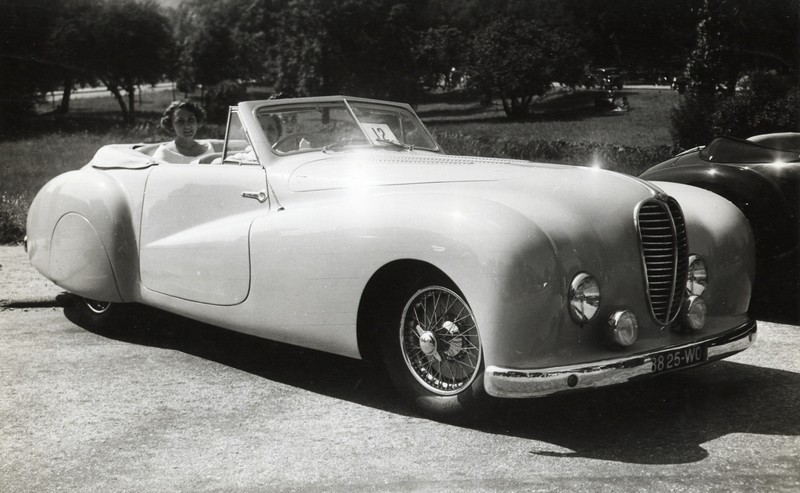
Delahaye, Bois de Boulogne

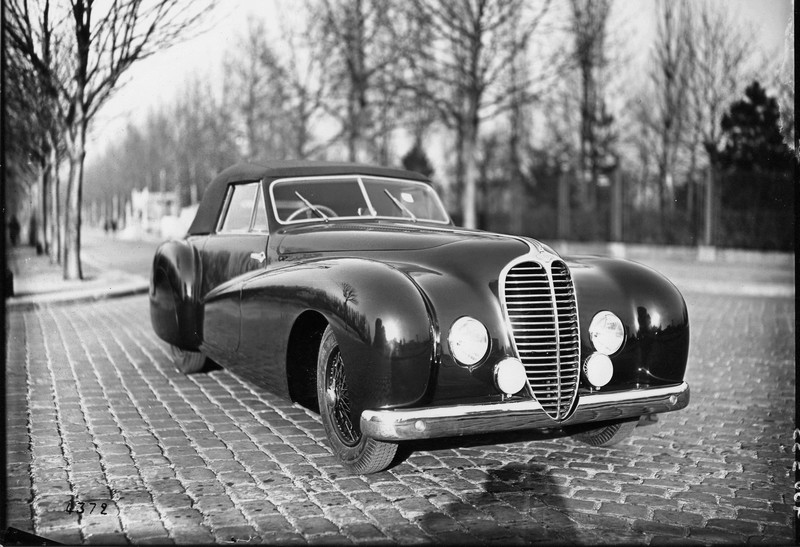
1948 Delahaye 135

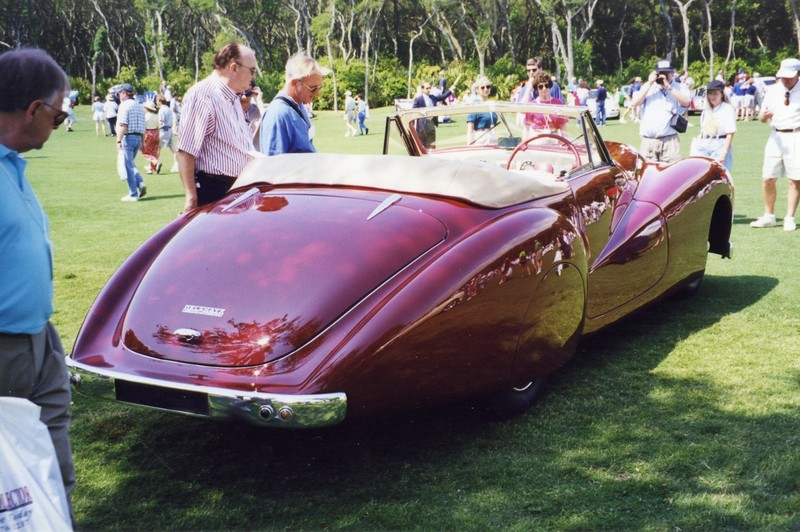
1948 Delahaye 135M

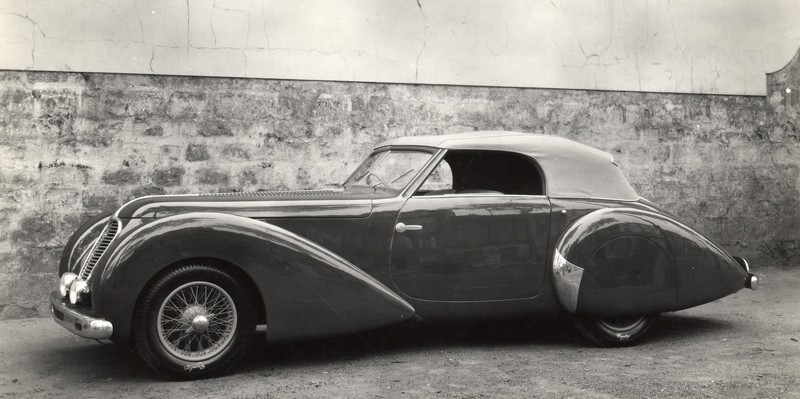
Delahaye 135 MS

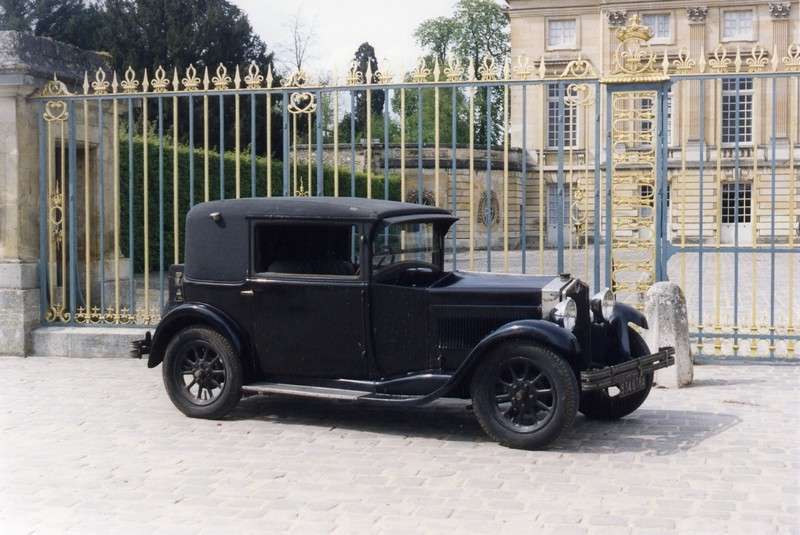
1929 Fiat 509 Coupé Royal

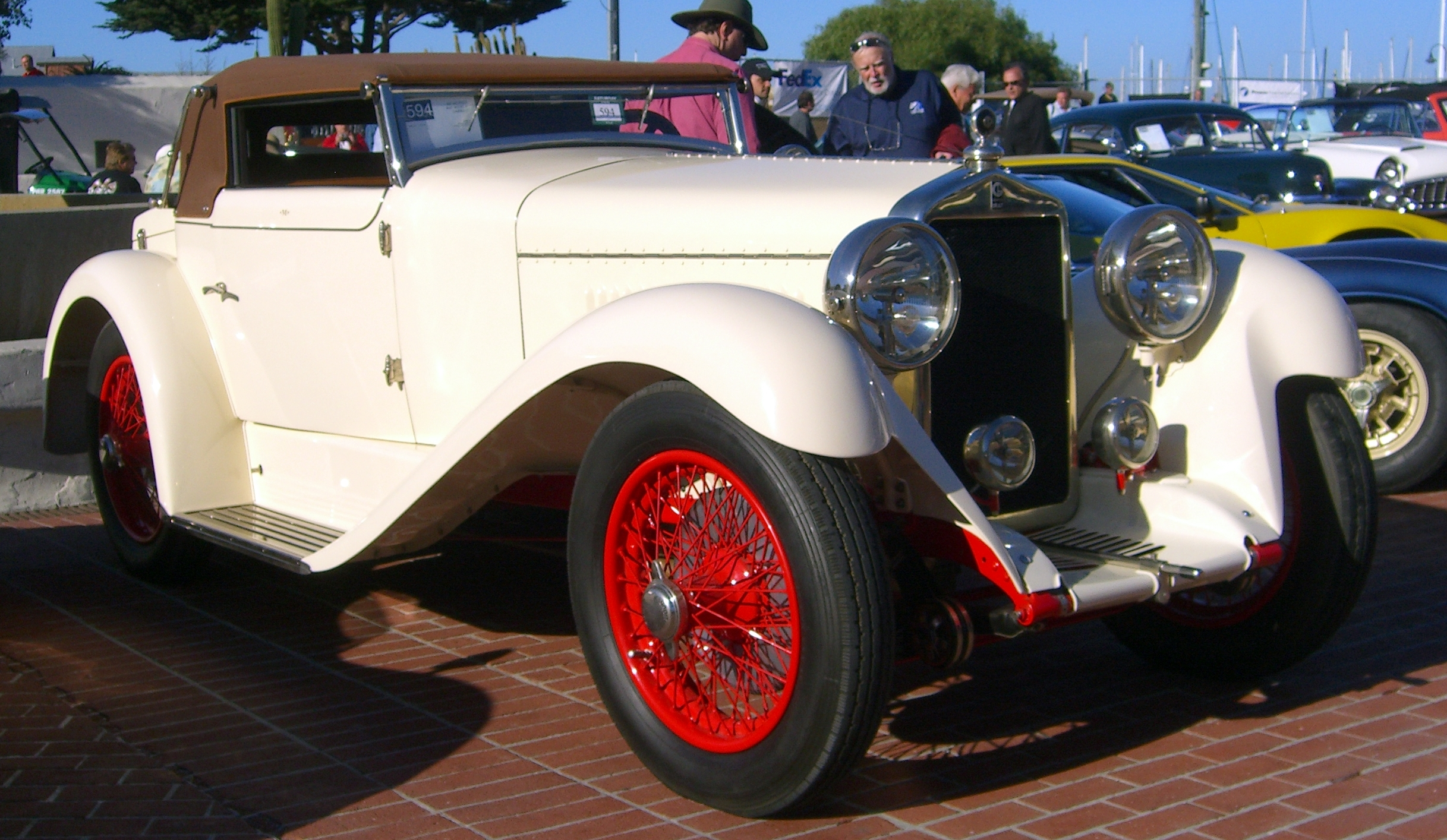
1927 Georges Irat Model A

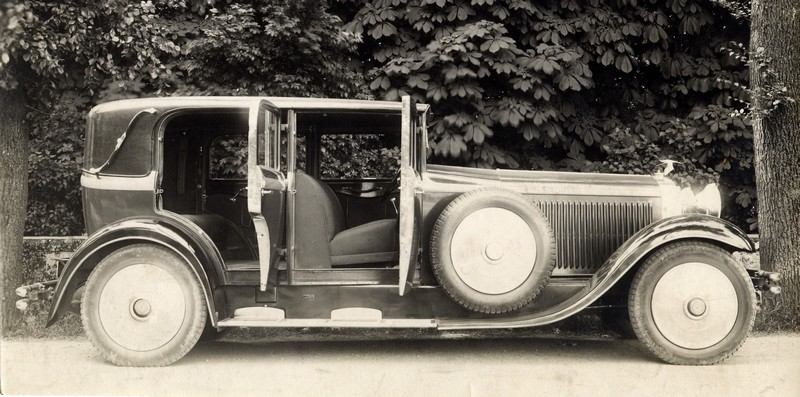
c.1930 Hispano-Suiza

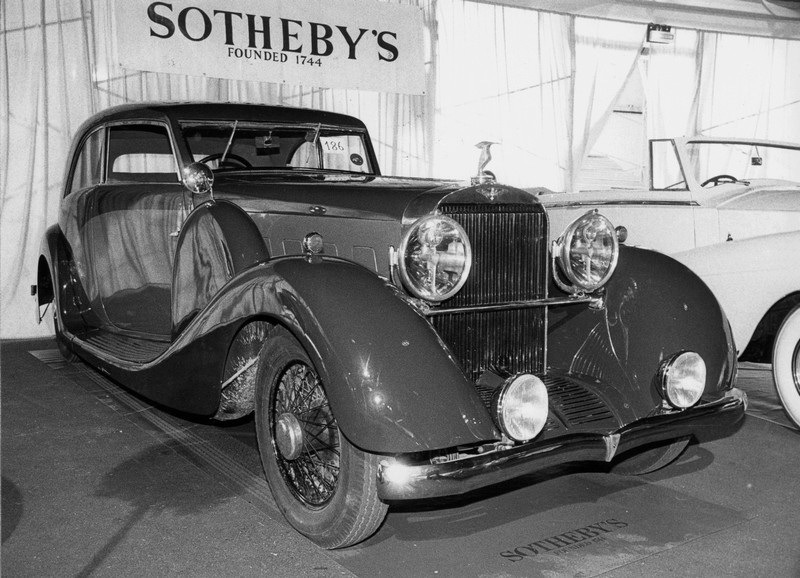
1933 Hispano-Suiza J12

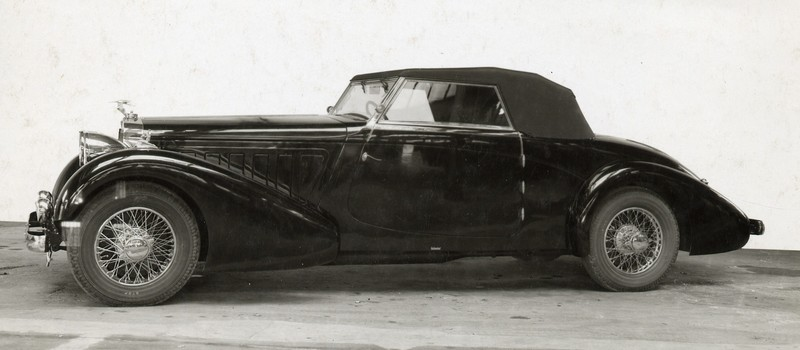
1936 Hispano-Suiza

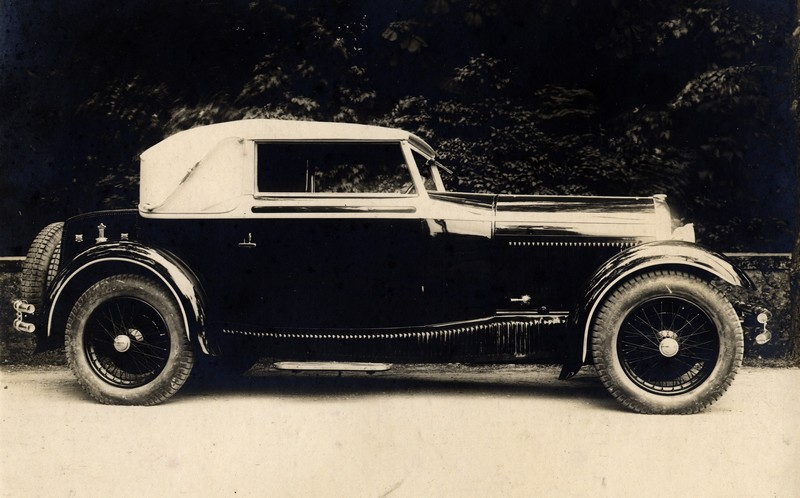
Hotchkiss

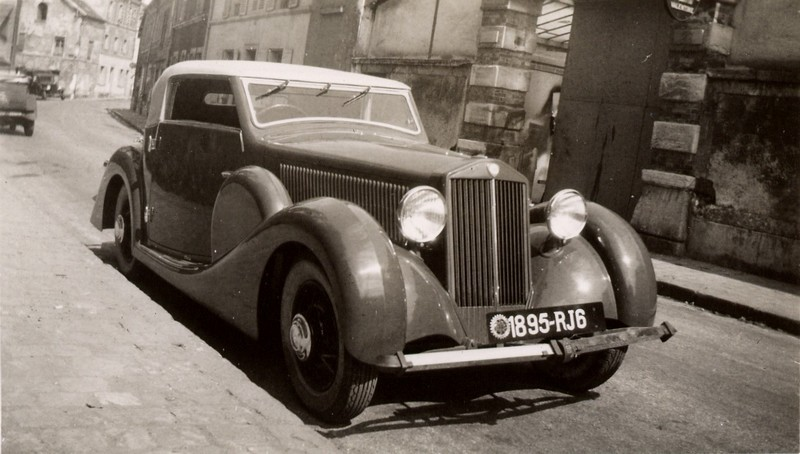
Lancia

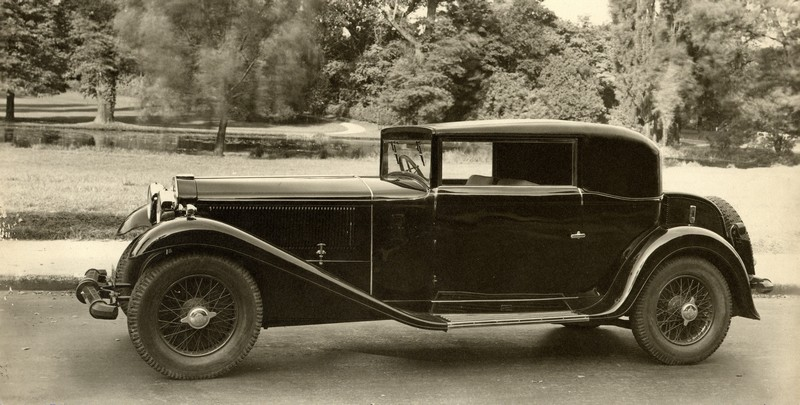
Lancia

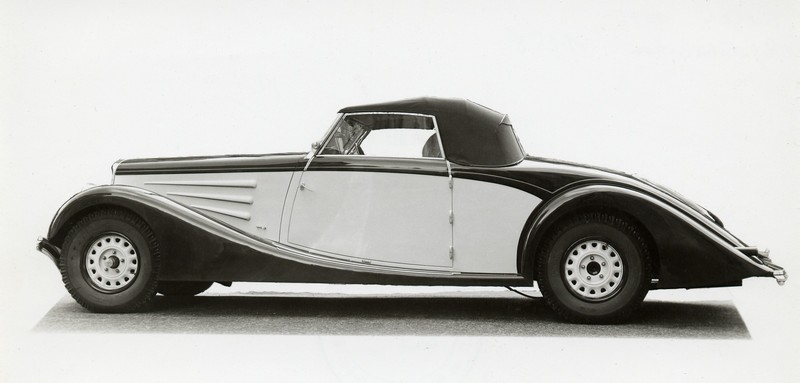
1935 Lancia Belna

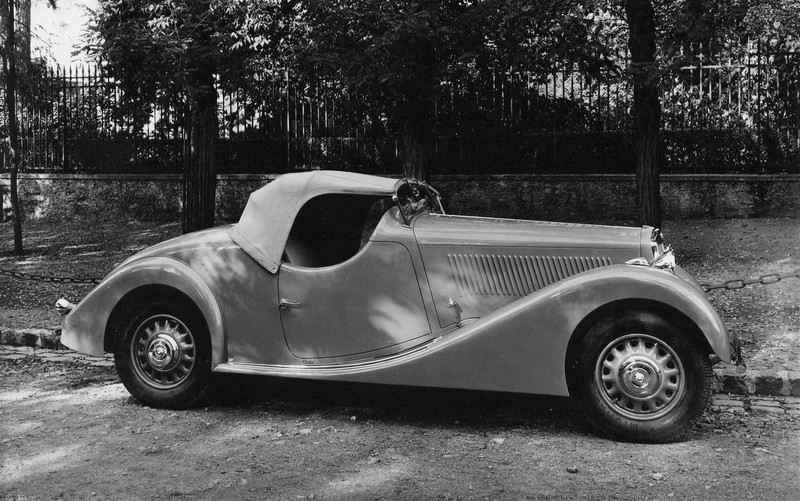
Lancia Belna

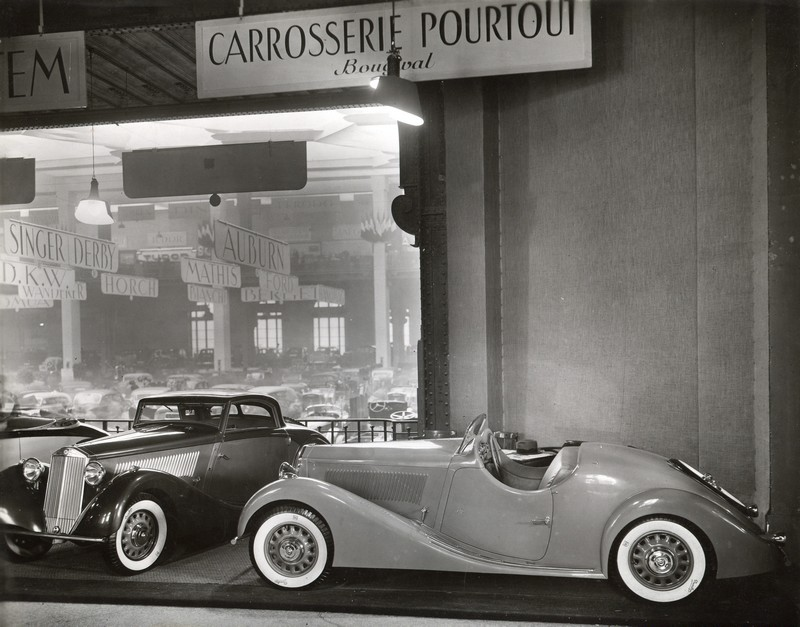
:Lancia Belna Roadster and Eclipse

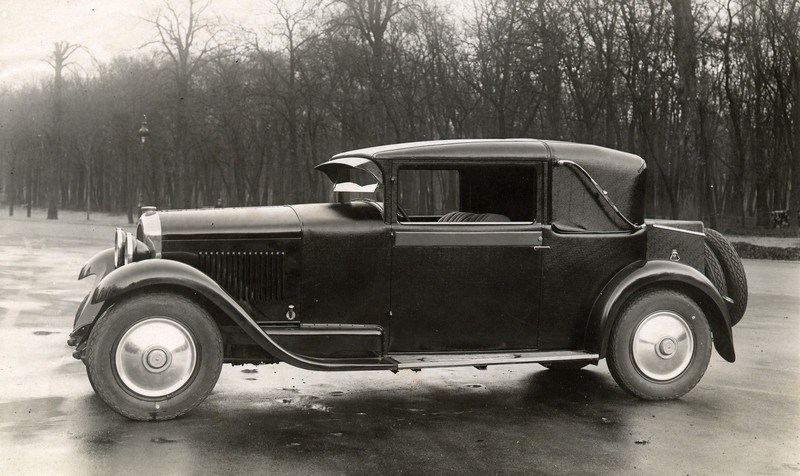
Panhard

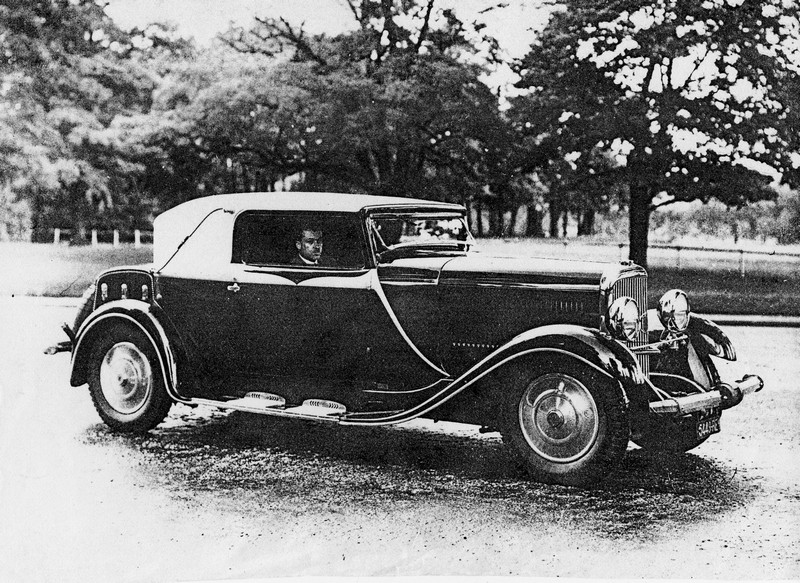
c.1930 Panhard

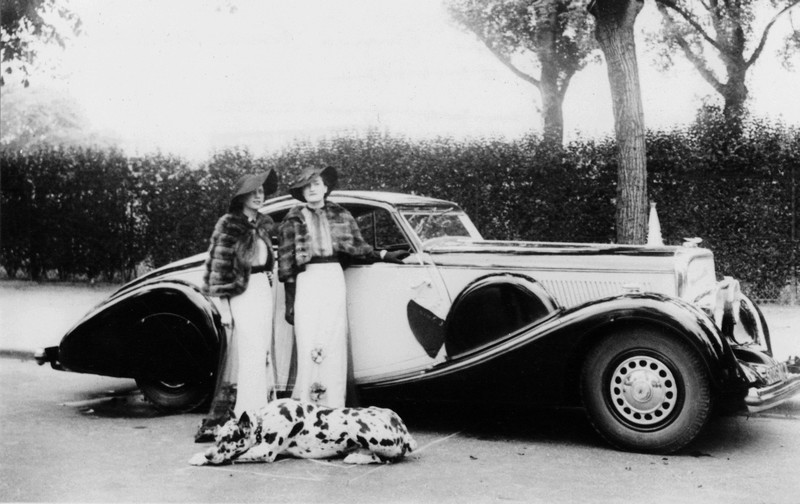
1934 Panhard Eclipse

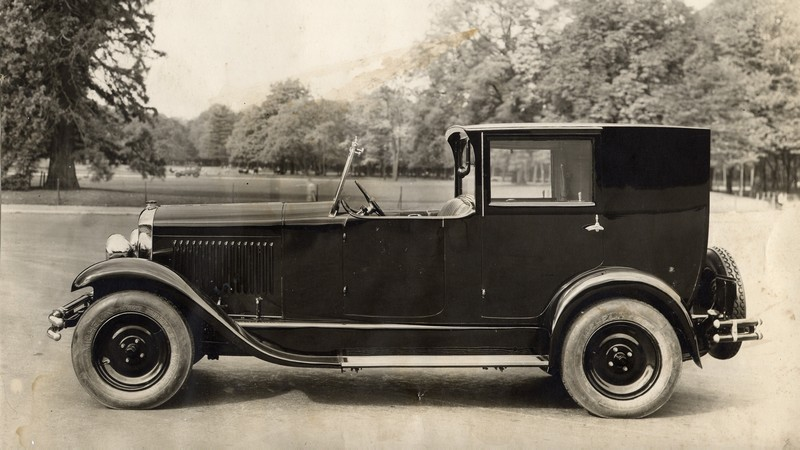
Peugeot 12 CV

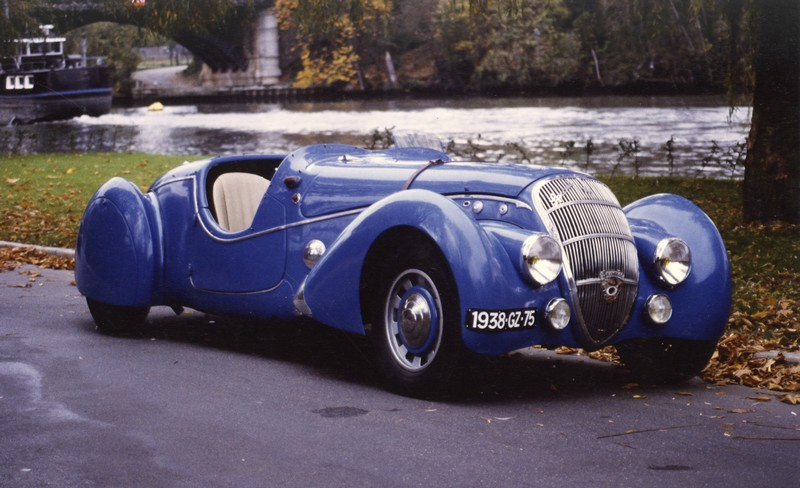
Peugeot 302 Darl'mat

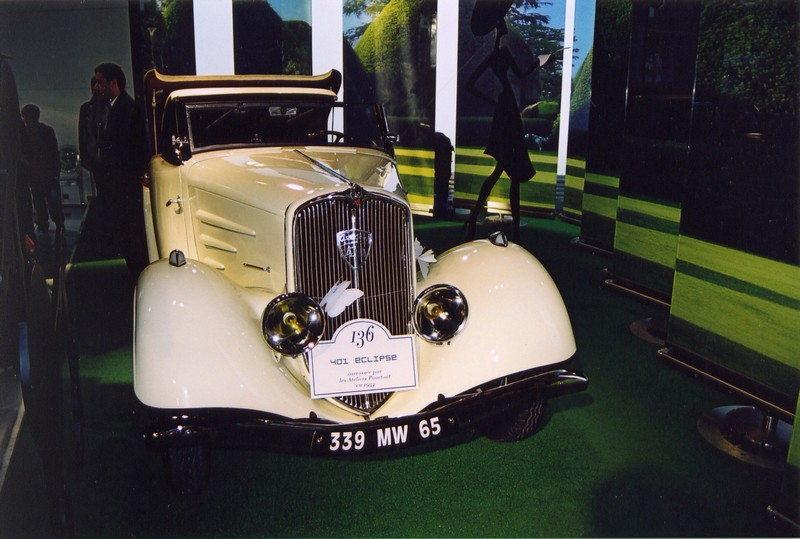
Peugeot 401 Eclipse, Champs Elysées

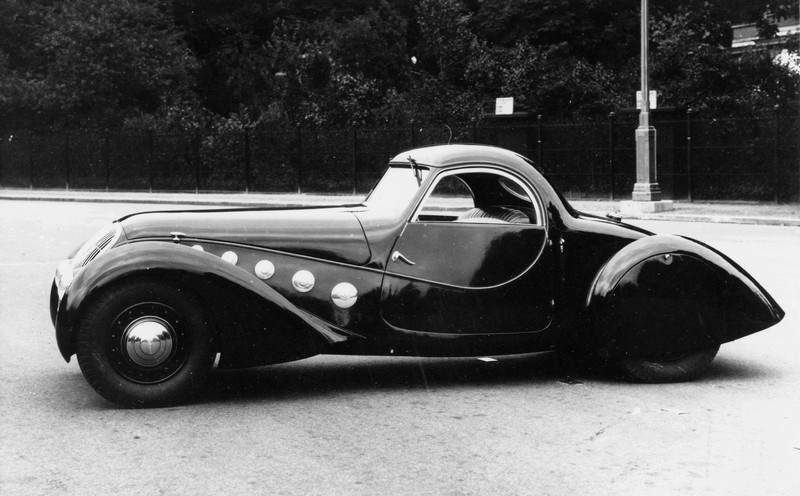
1938 Peugeot 402 Darl'mat "Spécial Sport"

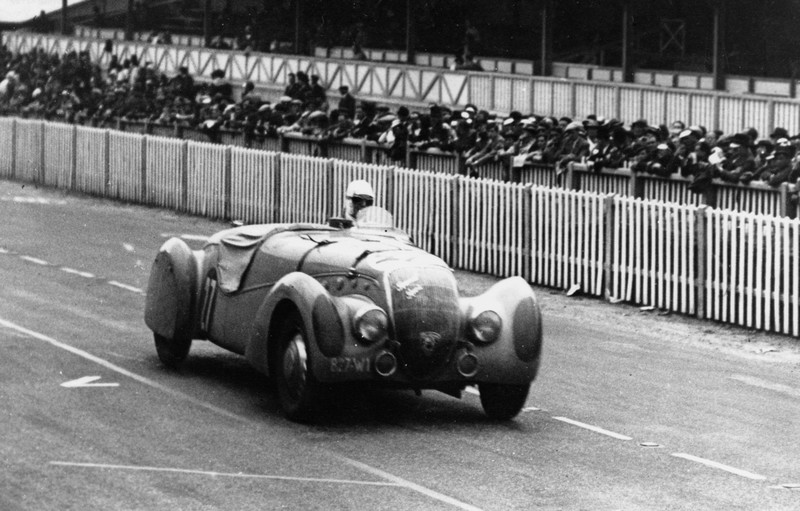
Peugeot 402 Darl'mat Le Mans

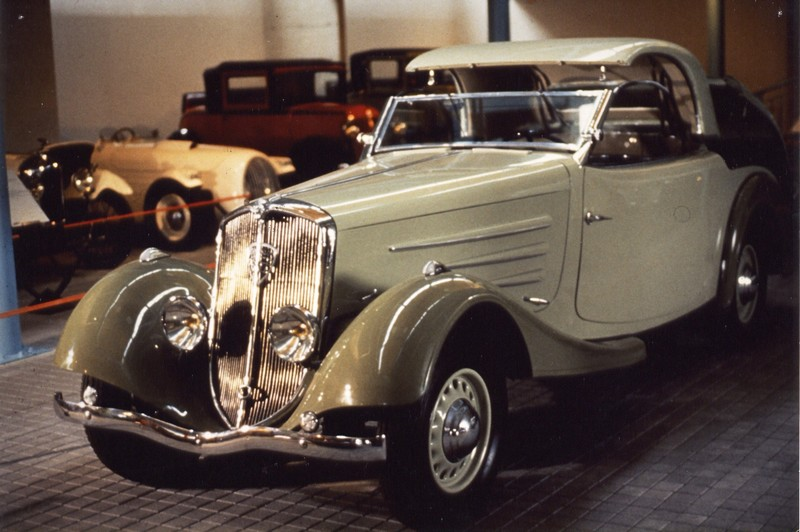
Peugeot 601D Eclipse

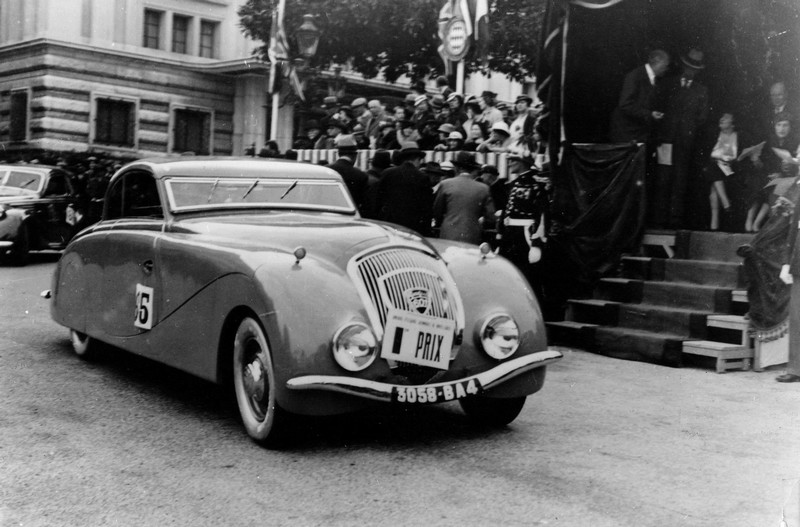
Peugeot 601DL Eclipse

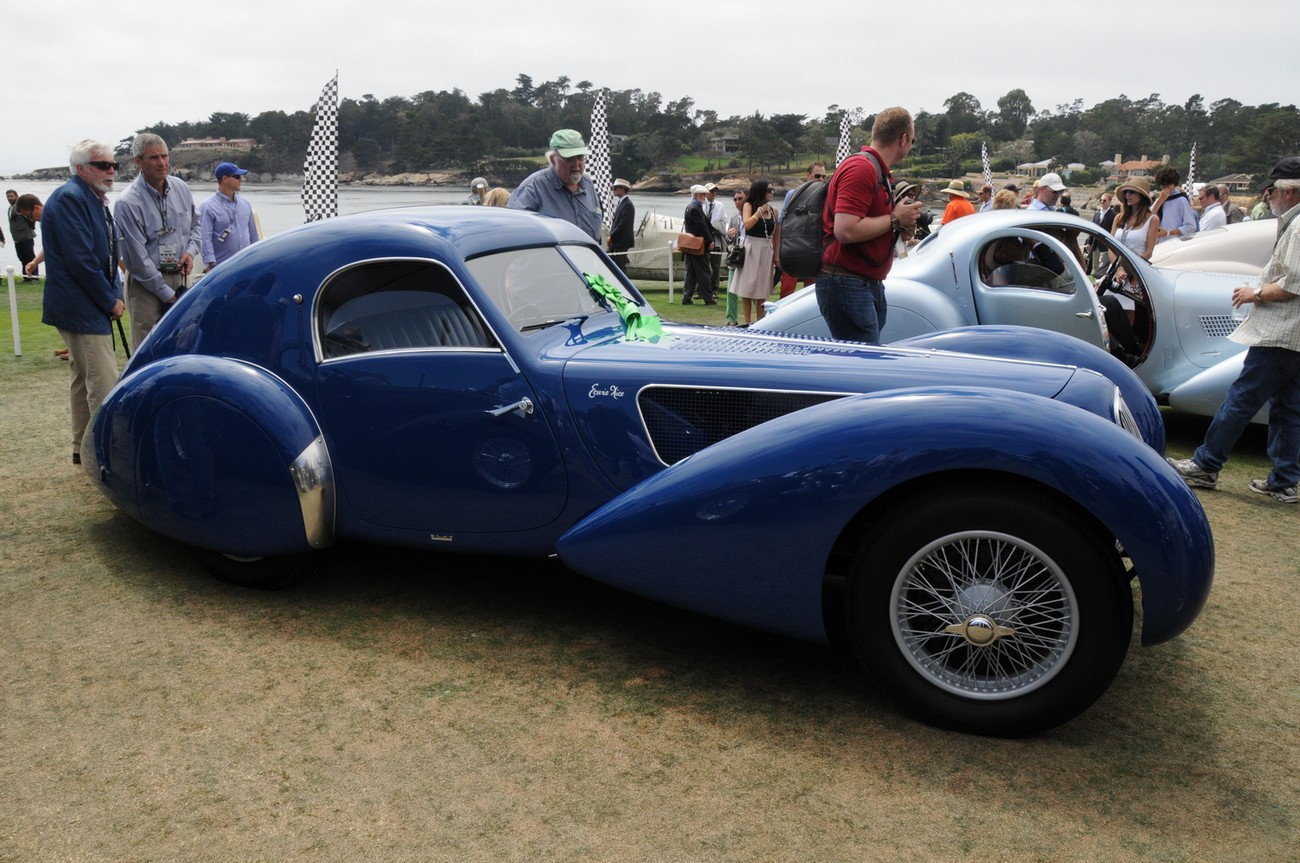
1939 Talbot-Lago T150C-SS coupé
