= Peugeot Type 176 =

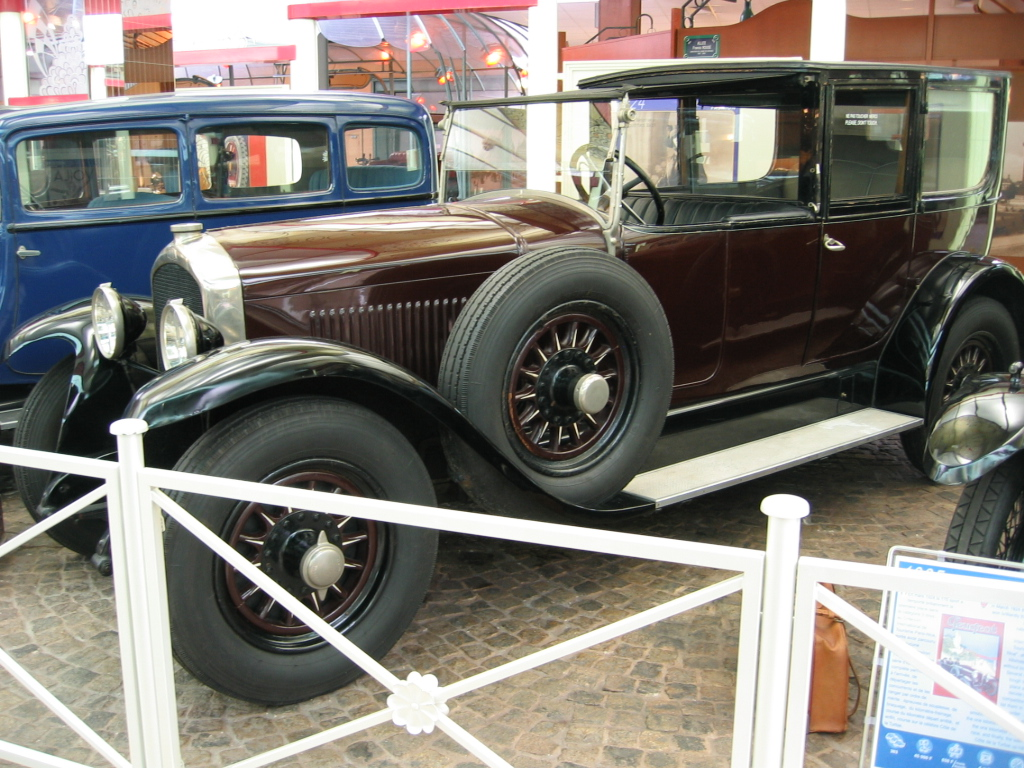

Overview
- Manufacturer: Peugeot SA
- Production: 1925 – 1928; 1512 produced

Body and chassis
- Body style: Limousine; Sedanca de ville
- Layout: FR layout

Powertrain
- Engine: 2493 cc I4

Dimensions
- Wheelbase: 3,250 mm (128.0 in)
- Length: 4,340 mm (170.9 in)
- Width: 1,650 mm (65.0 in)

Chronology
- Predecessor: Peugeot Type 153
- Successor: Peugeot 601

The Peugeot Type 176 is a top of the range car produced from 1925 until 1928 by the French auto manufacturer Peugeot. The car had a four-cylinder 2493 cc engine, which was a more modern design than earlier, and despite the low cylinder capacity, the car performed better than its predecessors. With this engine the car could be pushed to a maximum speed of 110 kilometres per hour (68 mph). The car is featured in the film Midnight in Paris.
