= Darl'mat =

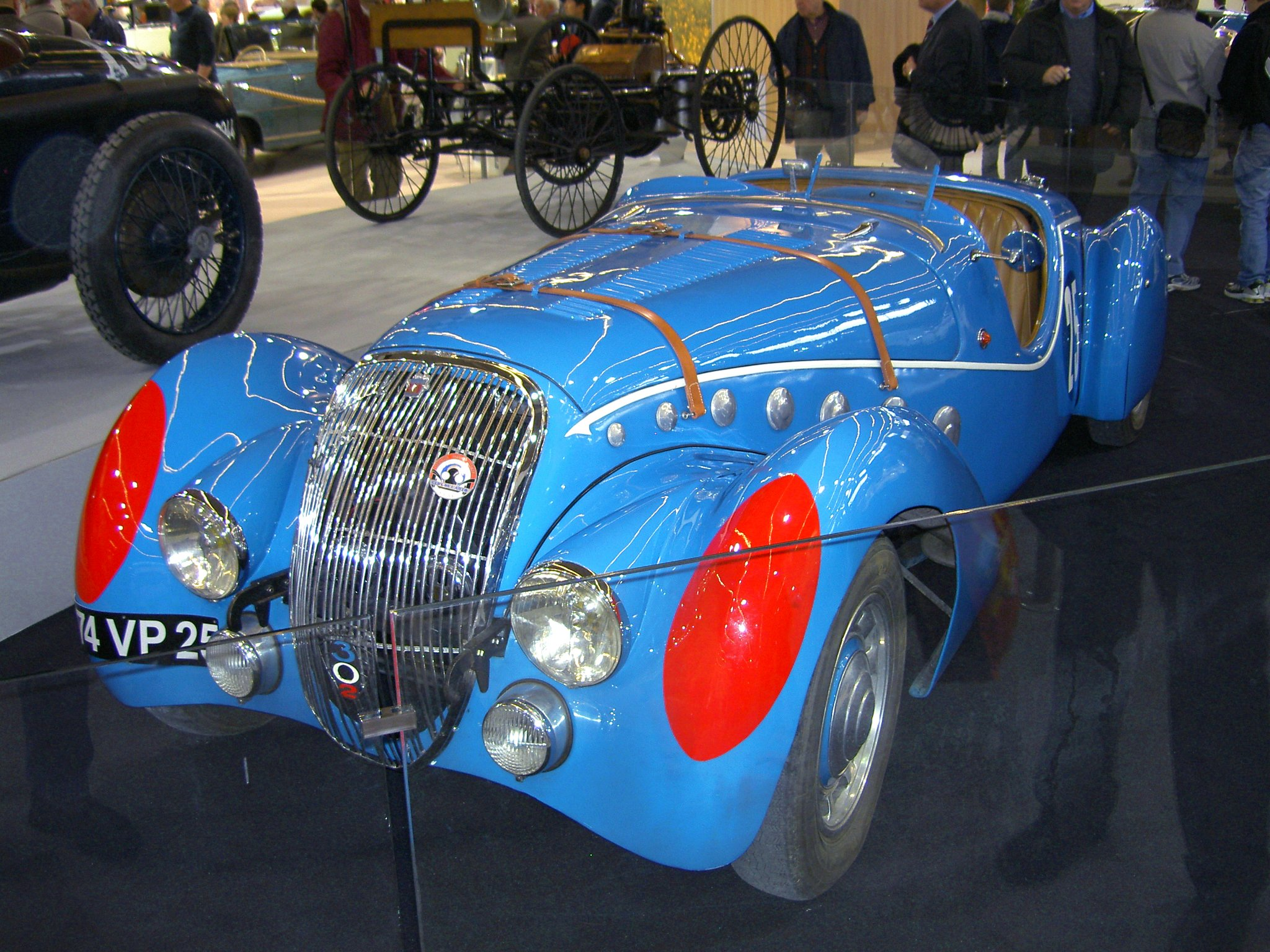
1937 302 Darl'mat prepared for the 24 heures du Mans race

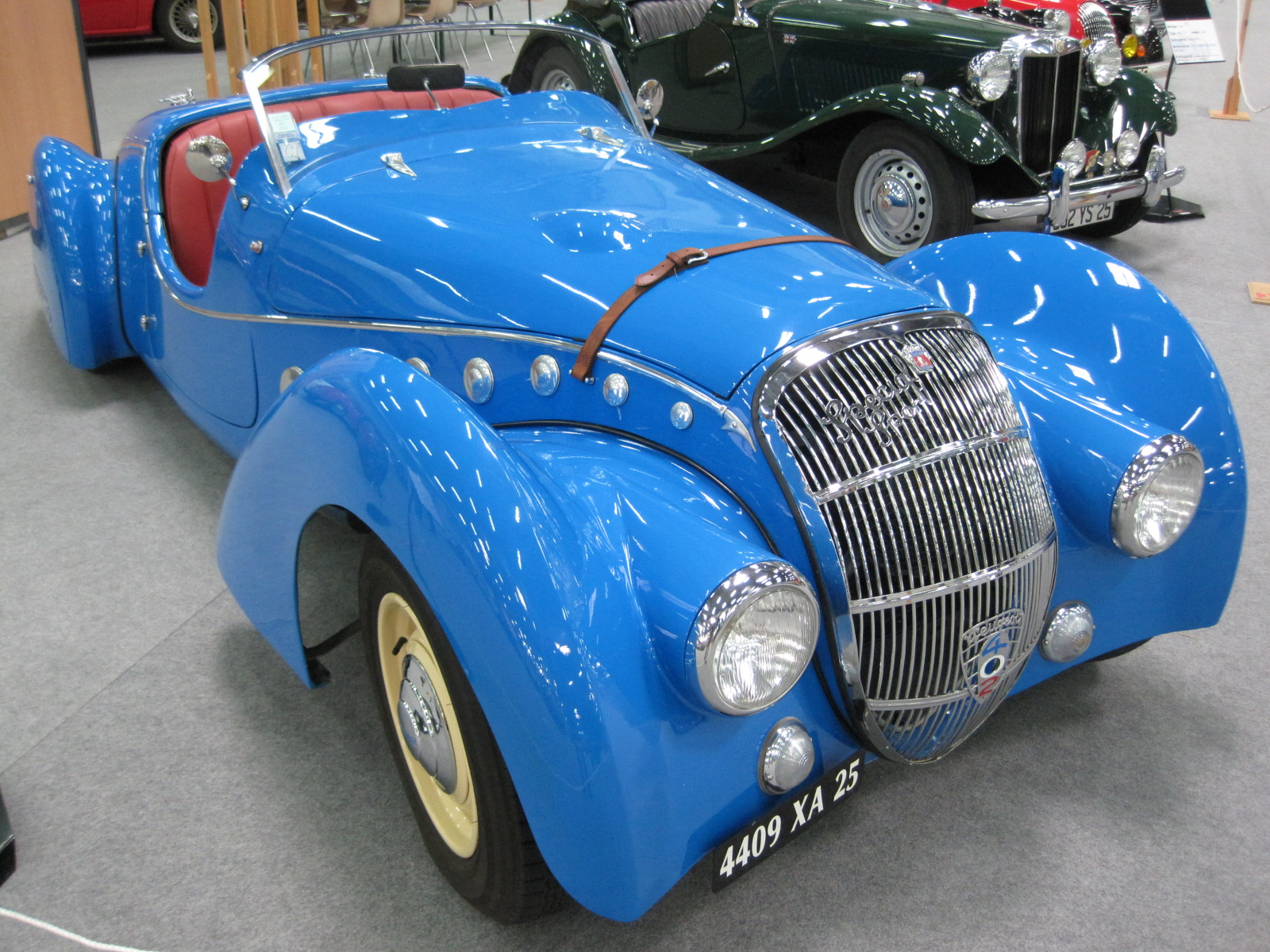
1937 Peugeot 402 Darl'mat at the Peugeot Museum

Émile Darl'mat (1892–1970) was the creator and owner of a Peugeot distributor with a car body business established at the rue de l'Université in Paris in 1923. In the 1930s the firm gained prominence as a low volume manufacturer of Peugeot-based sports cars. Business was interrupted by the Second World War, but at least one prototype was kept hidden throughout the period and directly after the war Darl'mat returned to the construction of special bodied Peugeots, although in the impoverished condition of post-war France business never returned to the volumes achieved during the 1930s.

== Building the business ==
The first cars were built at Darl'mat's workshops in Paris; however, during the 1930s the special bodied Peugeot-based coupés and cabriolets became increasingly integrated into the Peugeot range. During the second half of the decade, starting in 1936, Darl'mat's Peugeot-based coupes and cabriolets were built at the Peugeot plant in Sochaux.

The best remembered of the Darl'mats is a sports car based on the Peugeot 302: the engine was taken from the 402. Several Peugeot-Darl'mat 402 "spécial sport" models raced at Le Mans with success in 1937 and 1938. The cars were built in very limited numbers and three models - a roadster, a coupe, and a drop-head coupe - were offered.

This 1938 Special Sport Roadster omitted the side vents
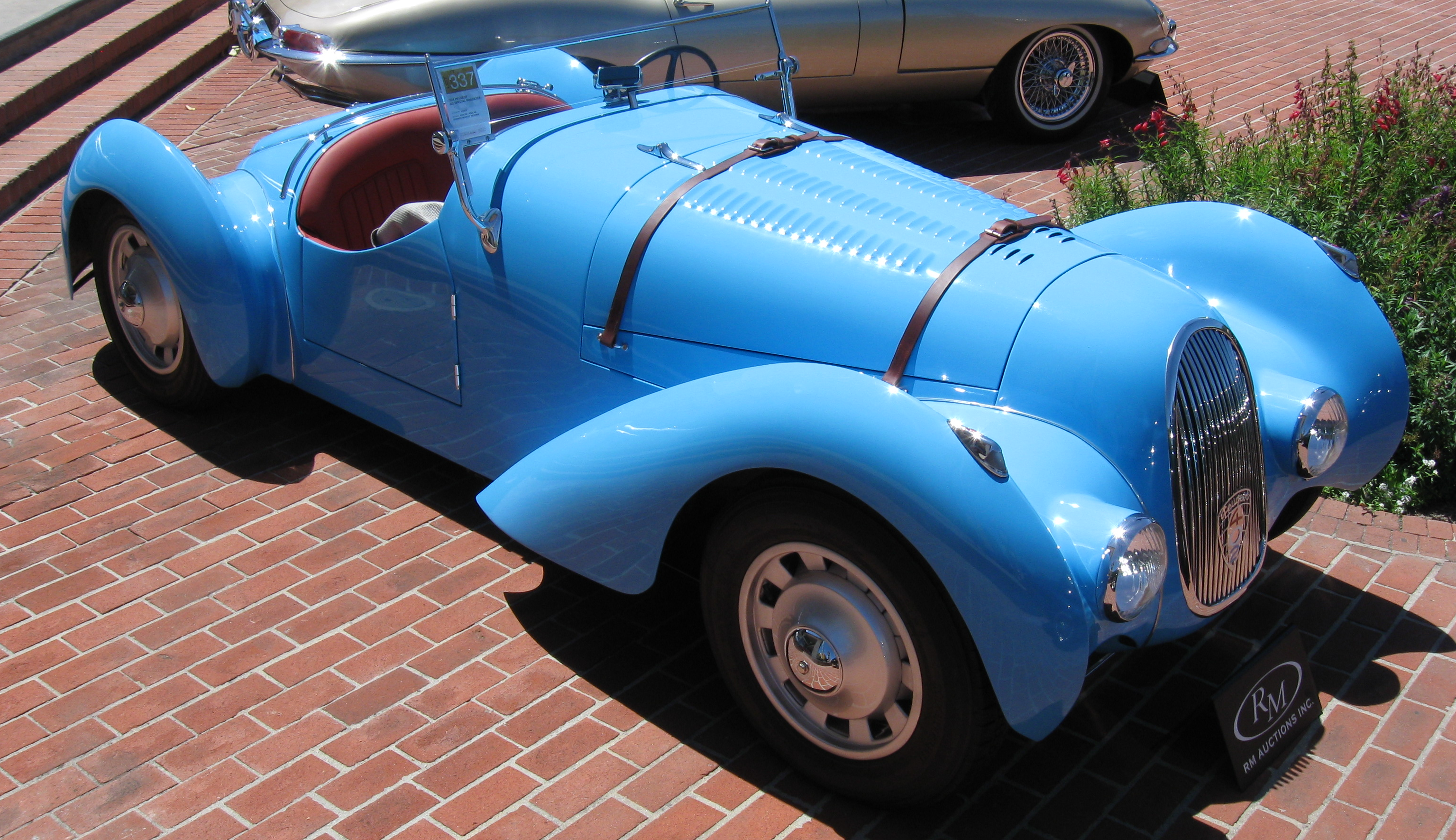
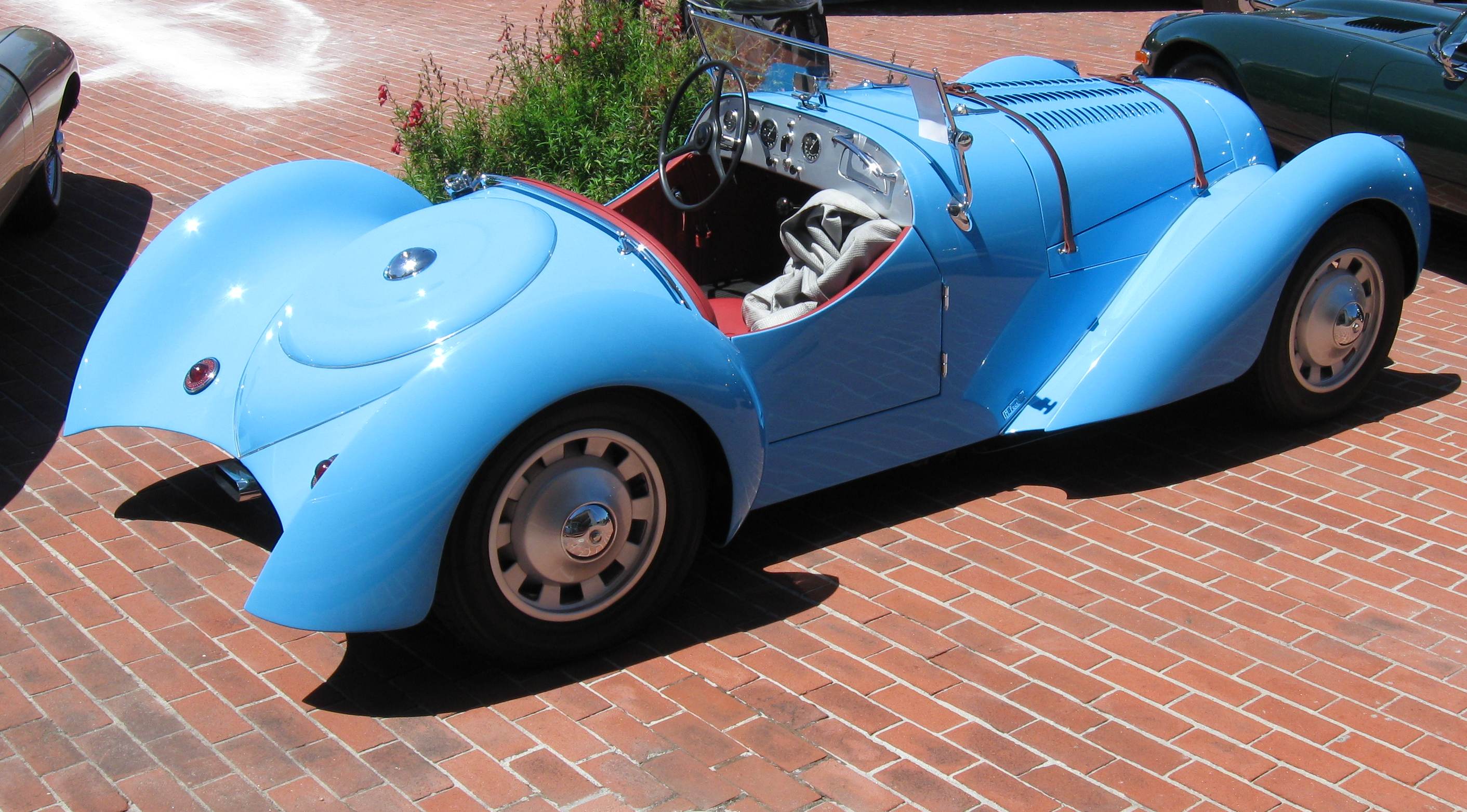

== Post-war developments ==
After the war, the company produced a small two-door fastback coupé based on the Peugeot 202. In 1947, with a team of drivers working in relays, this car appeared at Montlhéry and broke three speed records for the under 1100 cc class while using fuel at the rate of approximately 10 L/100 km (23.3 mpg). The car managed 1,000 miles (1,600 km) at an average speed of 144.5 km/h (89.8 mph), 2,000 miles (3,200 km) at an average speed of 145.0 km/h (90.1 mph) and achieving an average of 144.5 km/h (89.8 mph) over 12 hours. A few weeks later in October, this Darl'Mat 202 was exhibited in public at the Paris Motor Show. Despite drawing in the crowds at the motor show, it is not clear to what extent this design was developed into a car for general sale.

Better remembered are Darl'Mat's subsequent two-door cabriolet cars, these based on the Peugeot 203; sources indicate that by early 1953 more than 150 of these Peugeot 203 Darl'mat conversions were registered.

Dating from April 1953 is a picture of a closed gull-wing style coupe prototype, evidently inspired by the Mercedes-Benz 300SL. The company's final project as an aspiring auto-maker was a Peugeot 403-based coupé, but only five were built. After this the business concentrated on the mainstream activity on which its owner had originally embarked in 1923 as a Paris-based Peugeot dealer.
