= Copenhagen (disambiguation) =

Copenhagen (Danish: København) is the capital of Denmark and can refer to the city proper, as well as several geographical and administrative divisions in and around the city:

- Copenhagen Municipality, the largest of the municipalities making up the city of Copenhagen
- Copenhagen County, the former county of Copenhagen, separate from the municipality
- Copenhagen metropolitan area
- Urban area of Copenhagen, the central urban area of metropolitan Copenhagen

Copenhagen or Kopenhagen may also refer to:

== Places ==
- Copenhagen, Louisiana
- Copenhagen, New York
- Copenhagen, Ontario

== Football ==
- F.C. Copenhagen, a Danish football team
- Copenhagen XI, a Danish former representative football team

== Military ==
- Copenhagen (horse), the horse of Arthur Wellesley, 1st Duke of Wellington
- Battle of Copenhagen (1801), a naval battle between British and the forces of Denmark–Norway
- Battle of Copenhagen (1807), a British attack of the city of Copenhagen

== Ships ==
- SS Copenhagen, more than one ship with this name
- København (ship), a Danish naval sail training ship that vanished without trace

== Concepts ==
- Copenhagen Accord, 2009 agreement of delegates at the 15th session of the Conference of Parties to the United Nations Framework Convention on Climate Change
- Copenhagen interpretation, an interpretation of quantum mechanics
- Copenhagen criteria, a list of requirements required to join the European Union
- Copenhagen Consensus, a project that seeks to establish priorities for climate change and global (human) welfare based on political-econometric analysis
- Copenhagen School (disambiguation), various "schools" of theory originating in Copenhagen within several scientific disciplines
- The Copenhagen School (theology), a view of history during the Biblical period, whose adherents are sometimes called Biblical "minimalists" or "revisionists"
- Copenhagenization (bicycling), a concept in urban planning and design relating to the implementation of segregated bicycle facilities for utility cycling in cities

== Arts and entertainment ==
- "Copenhagen" (song), a 1924 popular song by Charlie Davis, recorded by many jazz performers
- Wonderful Copenhagen, the best-known song from the 1952 film Hans Christian Andersen
- Copenhagen (album), a live album by Galaxie 500 recorded in 1990 and released in 1997
- Copenhagen (play), a 1998 play by Michael Frayn
  - Copenhagen (2002 film), a 2002 television film based on Frayn's play
- Copenhagen Distortion, an annual festival for street life and electronic music, since 1998
- Copenhagen (2014 film), a 2014 film by Mark Raso
- "Copenhagen" (The Copenhagen Test), a 2025 television episode
- København (board game), a board game spun off from Monopoly
- Copenhagen, a 2017 song by electronic dance music duo Orbital

== Other uses ==
- Copenhagen paths, a term used to refer to Copenhagen-style bicycle lanes in Melbourne, Australia
- Copenhagen (tobacco), a brand of dipping tobacco (moist snuff)
- Copenhagen Tunnel, a railway tunnel near King Cross station in London
- Copenhagen (dessert), a Greek sweet
- 2009 United Nations Climate Change Conference (COP 15, COP/MOP 5), which took place in December 2009 in Copenhagen, Denmark

== See also ==
- Copen (disambiguation)
- Hagen (disambiguation)
