= Geneva school =

Geneva school may refer to:

== Schools of thought ==
- Geneva school (economics)
- Geneva school (literary criticism)
- Geneva school (linguistics)
- Geneva school (psychology)

== Organizations ==
- Geneva School of Diplomacy and International Relations, Switzerland
- The Geneva School of Watchmaking, Switzerland
- The Geneva School, Florida, United States

== See also ==
- Chicago school
- Vienna school
- Copenhagen school
