= Copen =

Copen may refer to:

== Places ==
- Copen, West Virginia, USA; an unincorporated community in Braxton County
- Copen Hill (disambiguation); several locations
- Copenhagen, Denmark; formerly "Copen Hagen" (Copen Haven, Copen Harbour)

== People and fictional characters ==
- Earl Copen, a fictional character from the 2000 film Animal Factory
- Rose Copen, a fictional character from Y: The Last Man
- Copen, a playable character from the 2016 videogame Azure Striker Gunvolt 2, and character in the Azure Striker Gunvolt series.

== Other uses ==
- Daihatsu Copen (ダイハツ・コペン), Japanese 2-door convertible kei-car

== See also ==
- Copenhagen (disambiguation)
- Coper (disambiguation)
- Cope (disambiguation)
- Cop (disambiguation)
