= Copen Hill =

Copen Hill may refer to:

- Copenhill (or Copen Hill), Atlanta, Georgia, USA; a neighborhood
- CopenHill (or Copen Hill), Amager, Copenhagen Denmark; a co-generation power station

== See also ==
- Copen (disambiguation)
- Hill (disambiguation)
