= Copenhagen (dessert) =

Greek dessert

Copenhagen (Greek: Κοπεγχάγη) is a syrup-based Greek dessert, named so after King George I of Greece, who was of Danish descent.

== Recipe ==
The dessert is made off of two layers of phyllo, spread with butter, with a cream filling in between. The cream is made with egg yolks, sugar, ground almonds and meringue, and it is additionally flavoured with some cognac and cinnamon. Copenhagen is then cut in pieces and put in the oven to be baked.

Next, once the dessert has cooled off enough, syrup made of sugar and honey is poured all over it.

It is usually cut and served in triangle or rhombus-shaped pieces.
