= Vienna School =

Vienna School or Viennese School may refer to:

== Music ==
- First Viennese School, 18th-century classical music composers in Vienna
- Second Viennese School, 20th-century composers in Vienna

== Other ==
- Vienna School of Art History (19th and 20th centuries)
- Vienna School of History, 20th century historians attempting analyzing "barbarian" ethnicity
- Vienna Circle, 20th-century Viennese philosophers, whose influences are known as the Vienna School
- Vienna School of Ethnology, a 20th-century anthropological movement, now discredited
- Austrian School of economics, sometimes called the "Vienna School"
- Vienna School of Dermatology, a group of dermatologists affiliated to the University of Vienna in the second half of the 19th Century

== See also ==
- Vienna
- Austria
- University of Vienna
