= Coper =

Coper may refer to:

- Hans Coper (1920–1981), German-born British studio potter
- Michael Coper (1946–2019), Australian academic, lawyer, and author
- Coper, Boyacá, town and municipality in the Colombian Department of Boyacá

== See also ==
- Copper (disambiguation)
- Cooper (disambiguation)
- Cope (disambiguation)
