= SS Copenhagen =

Copenhagen was the name of a number of steamships, including:

- SS Copenhagen (1898), a steamship wrecked off Florida in 1900
- SS Copenhagen (1907), a Great Eastern Railway passenger ferry
