= Daihatsu Copen =

2-door convertible kei car

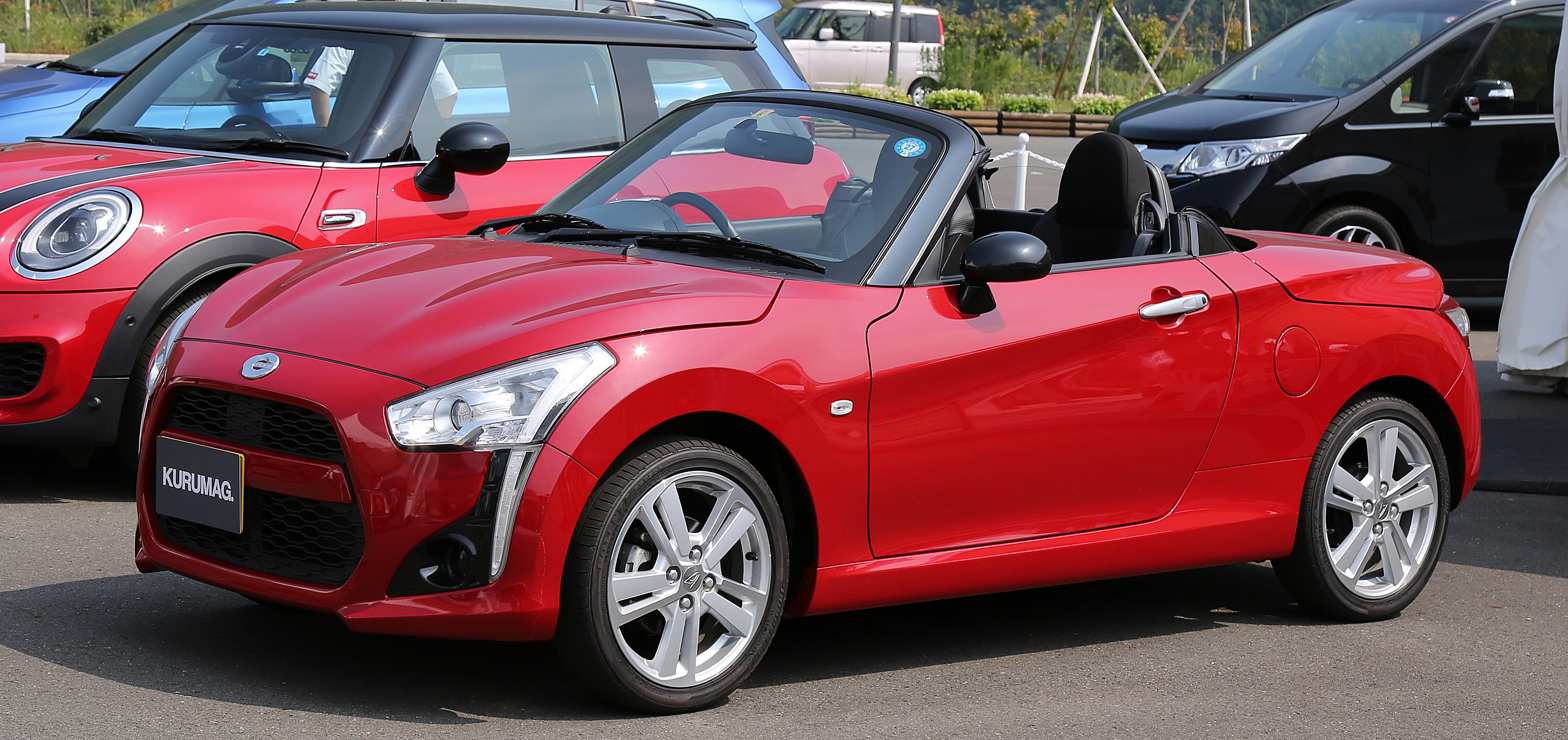
- Second generation Daihatsu Copen

Overview
- Manufacturer: Daihatsu
- Production: June 2002–September 2012; June 2014–August 2026
- Assembly: Japan: Ikeda, Osaka (Ikeda plant)

Body and chassis
- Class: Kei car (Japan); Sports car (international)
- Layout: Front-engine, front-wheel-drive

Chronology
- Predecessor: Daihatsu Leeza Spider

The Daihatsu Copen (Japanese: ダイハツ・コペン, Daihatsu Kopen) is a 2-door convertible kei car built by the Japanese car company Daihatsu. It debuted at the 1999 Tokyo Motor Show, as the Daihatsu Copen concept. The second generation model debuted as the Kopen (Future Included) at the 2013 Tokyo Motor Show.

This is Daihatsu's first open-top car since the Leeza Spider. All Copens features an Active Top with an electrically operated hydraulic pump-operated retractable roof, a first for a kei sport car.

Both generation uses the suffix "K" model code, which is only used for convertibles. It is the last Daihatsu's passenger car lineup that offered a manual transmission option in the country.

== First generation (L880; 2002 / L881; 2007) ==
First generation
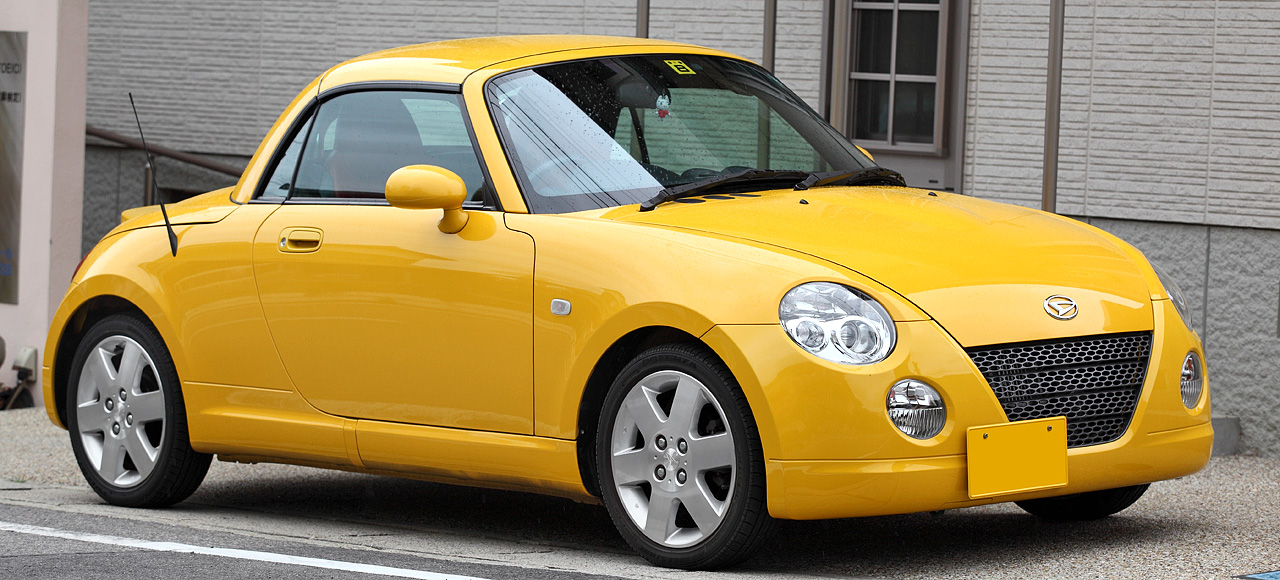

Overview
- Model code: L880/L881
- Production: June 2002–September 2012

Body and chassis
- Body style: 2-door coupe; 2-door roadster (2002–2007)

Powertrain
- Engine: Gasoline: 659 cc JB-DET twin-scroll turbocharged I4; 1297 cc K3-VE I4
- Transmission: 5-speed manual; 4-speed automatic

Dimensions
- Wheelbase: 2,230 mm (87.8 in)
- Length: 3,395 mm (133.7 in)
- Width: 1,475 mm (58.1 in)
- Height: 1,245 mm (49.0 in)
- Curb weight: 810–830 kg (1,786–1,830 lb)

The Copen was originally designed with a 660 cc turbocharged engine in order to meet Japanese kei car regulations. However, since this engine did not meet environmental emissions standards in several other countries, the Copen was fitted with a more powerful but cleaner 1.3-litre, naturally aspirated engine in these markets since October 2007. Styling was inspired by the Nissan Figaro and Audi TT Roadster.

The leading characteristic of this model was the active top, a motorized hide-away hard roof. However, On 19 June 2002, there existed a variation with a detachable top. This version was about 30 kg lighter than the regular model. The detachable top variant was dropped in mid-2007.

The Copen was never built with left-hand-drive for the first four model years (2002-2005). The right-hand-drive Copen with the smaller 660cc engine was officially sold in Germany and some European countries from 2003 to 2005. After lackluster sales in Germany for the right-hand-drive Copen, Daihatsu introduced a left-hand-drive version with a bigger, 1.3-litre engine for export markets. Given the L881 model code, this was first announced at 2005 IAA Frankfurt along with the new ZZ trim level. The sales increased to 802 units for model year 2006. A right-hand drive version of the 1.3-litre model was added in 2007 but was never sold in Japan. The sales number declined greatly from 2007 until the Copen was withdrawn from German market in the summer of 2011. Daihatsu introduced 60 "Farewell Edition" (Abschiedsmodell) Copens in Germany.

The Copen has been featured on the UK show Top Gear where James May attempted to find the best convertible car. The contestants were the Mercedes-Benz CLK, Audi A4, Citroën C3 Pluriel, Volkswagen New Beetle, and the Copen. May loved the Copen, but he had one small problem: it felt "toy-ish".

To celebrate Daihatsu's 100th anniversary, Daihatsu introduced the Copen Ultimate Edition II Memorial in September 2007. Differences from the regular model includes: The tail lamps were redesigned with clear housing, a black-colored front grille, BBS 15-inch aluminum wheels, and Recaro seats, and number plate. Production continued again in early 2008 to early 2010 under the name Ultimate Edition II.

On 13 January 2011, Daihatsu announced that it would withdraw the Copen from the European market in 2011 due to the increasing strength of the Japanese Yen and sharp decline in sales from 2006 to 2011. Daihatsu announced on 2 April 2012 that the production for the Copen would cease in August 2012 with the final "10th Anniversary Edition" model, after over 56,000 examples of the first generation Copen had been built. The 500 "10th Anniversary Edition" models were luxuriously appointed with leather upholstery and commemorative 10th Anniversary plate in the door openings.

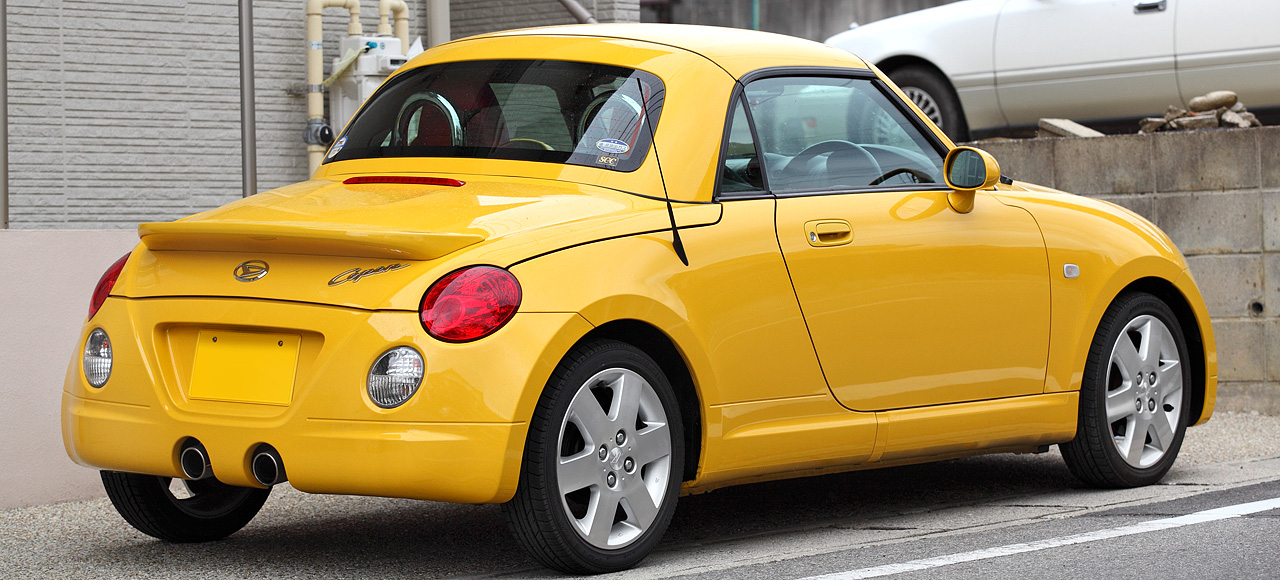
Rear view

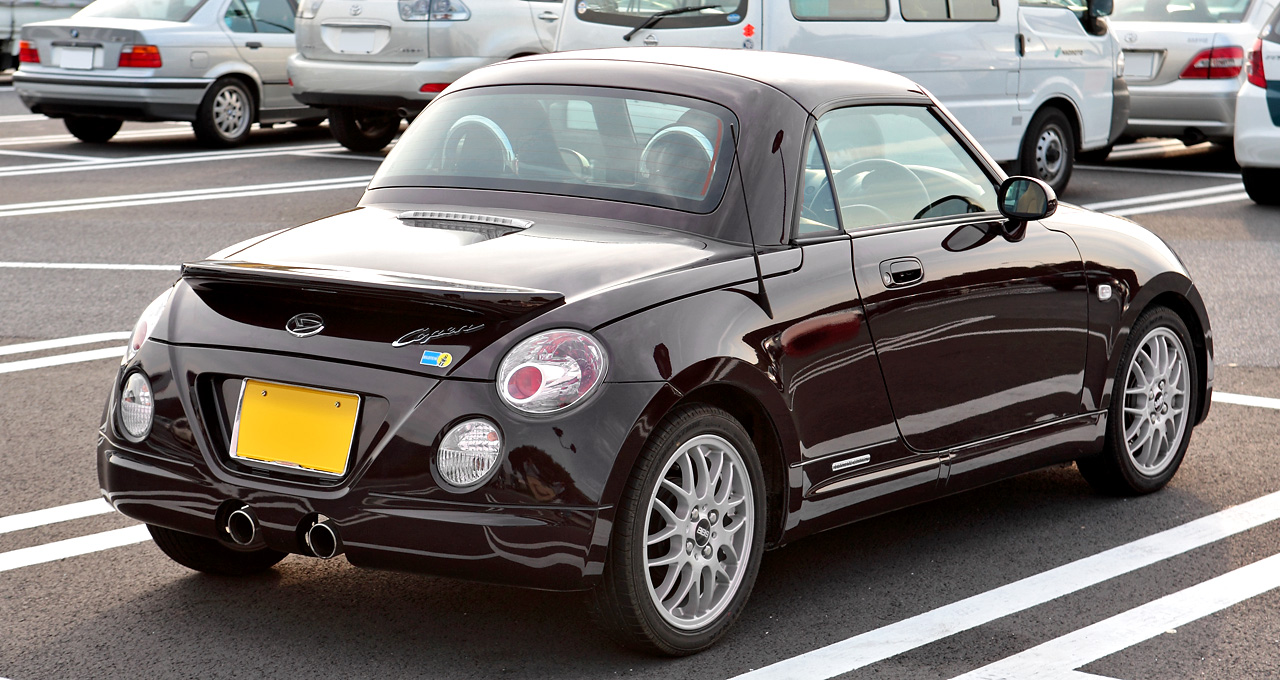
2007–2010 Copen Ultimate Edition (with aftermarket rear spoiler)

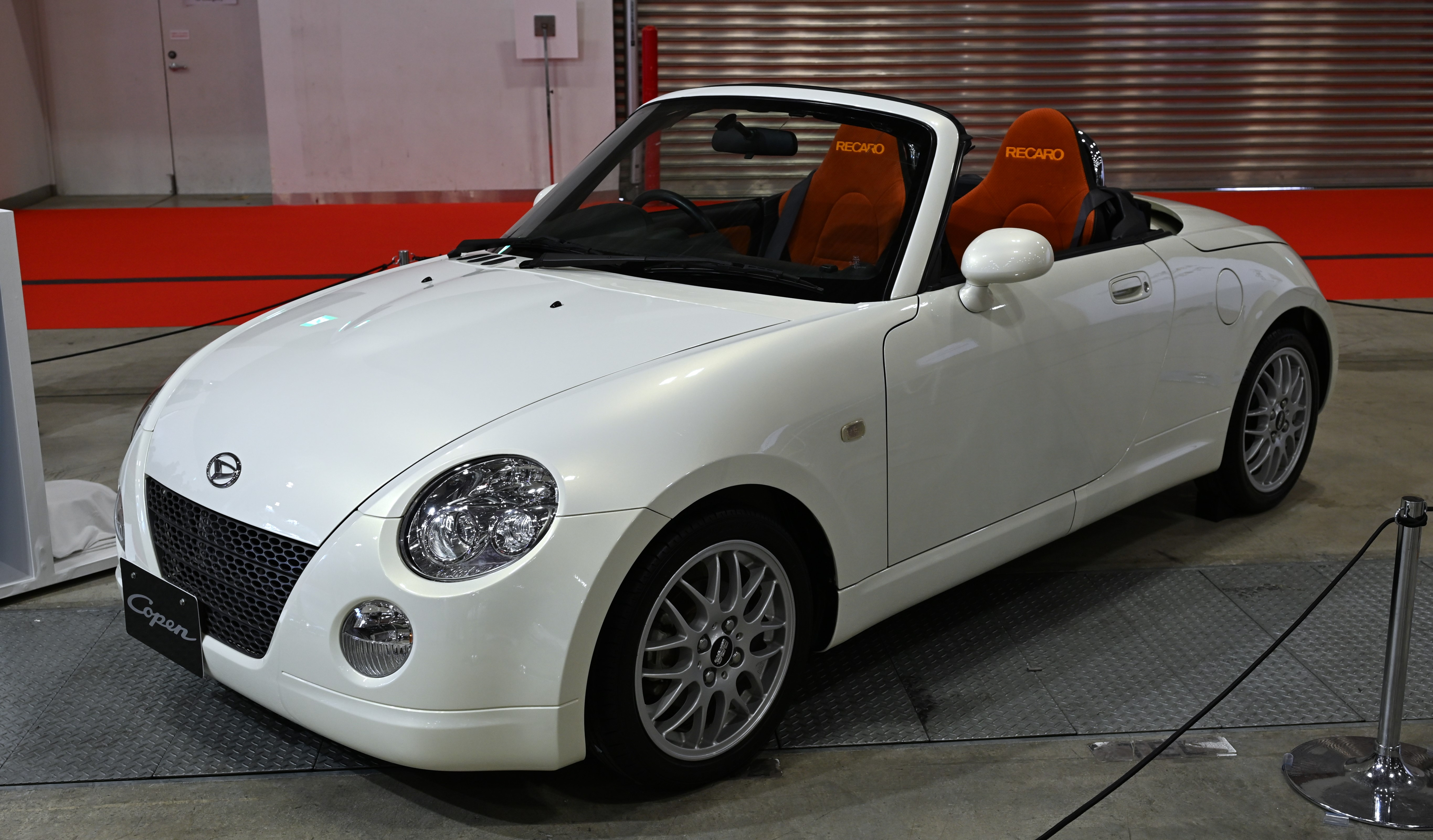
Convertible model

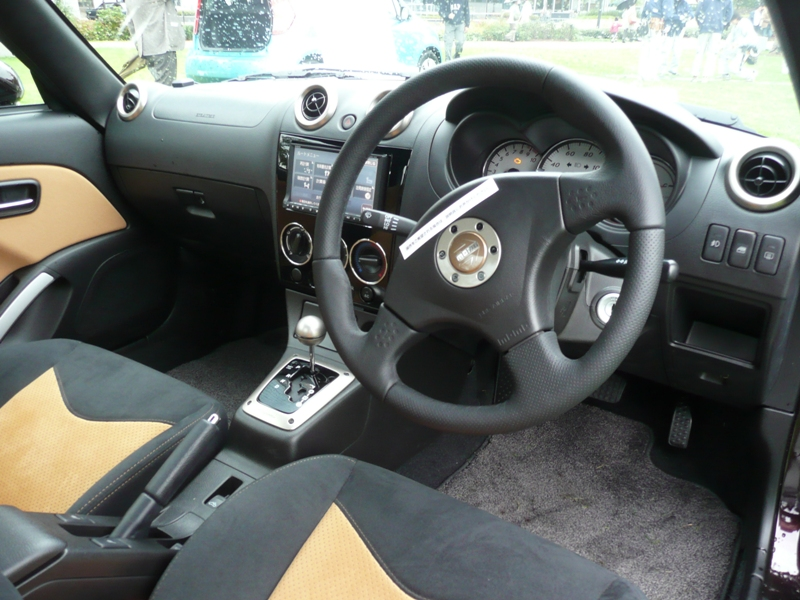
Interior

=== Concept Cars ===
In 2005, Daihatsu showcased the Copen ZZ (double Z), differing from the regular Copen in its slightly redesigned fascia and larger size and the use of a 1.5-litre engine. It was exhibited at 39th Tokyo Motor Show.

Furthemore, the OFC-1 (2007), D-X (2011), and the D-R (2012) were all exhibited at Tokyo Auto Show as convertibles.

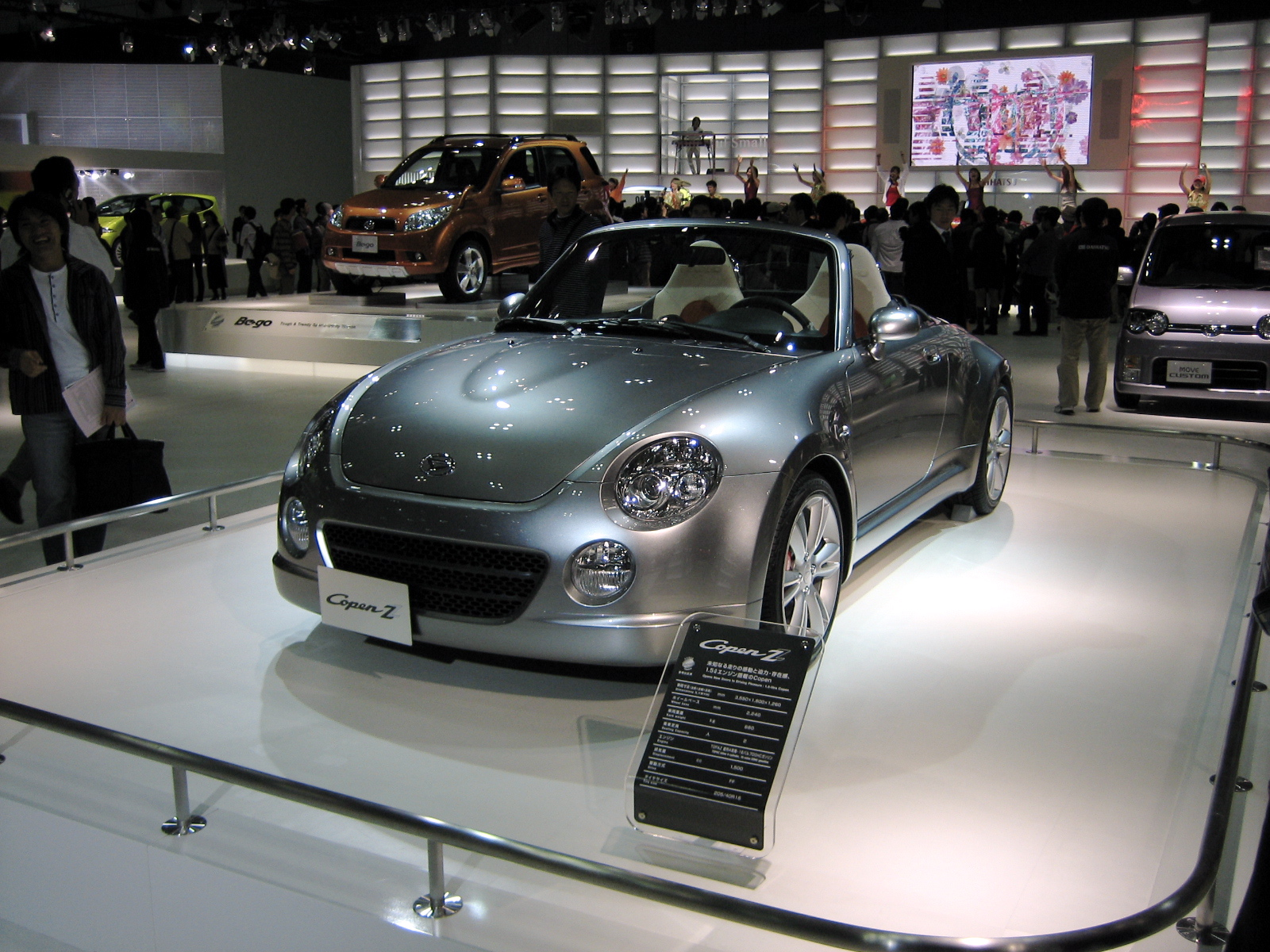
Daihatsu Copen Z at the 2005 Tokyo Motor Show

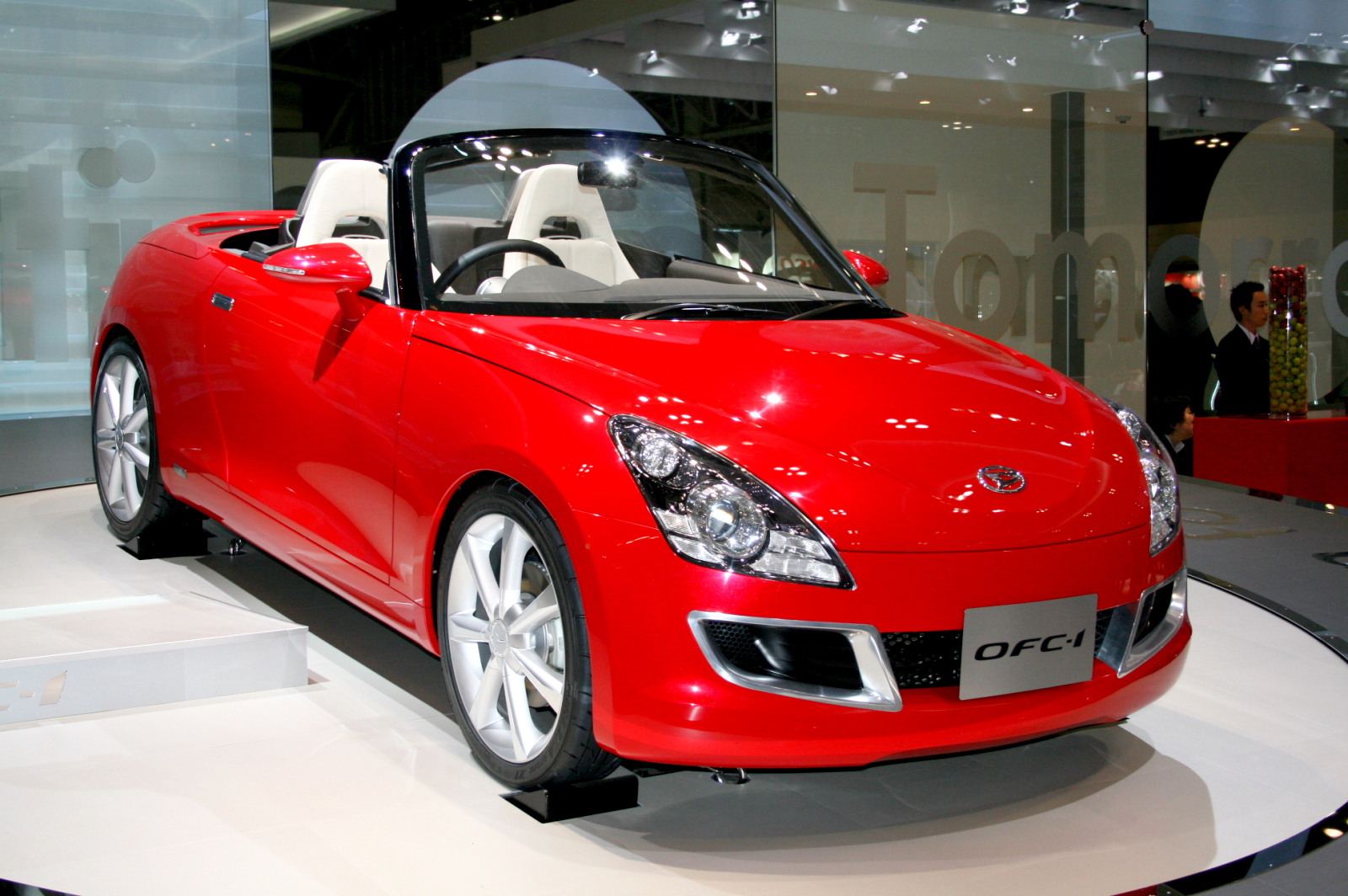
OFC-1 at the 2007 Tokyo Motor Show

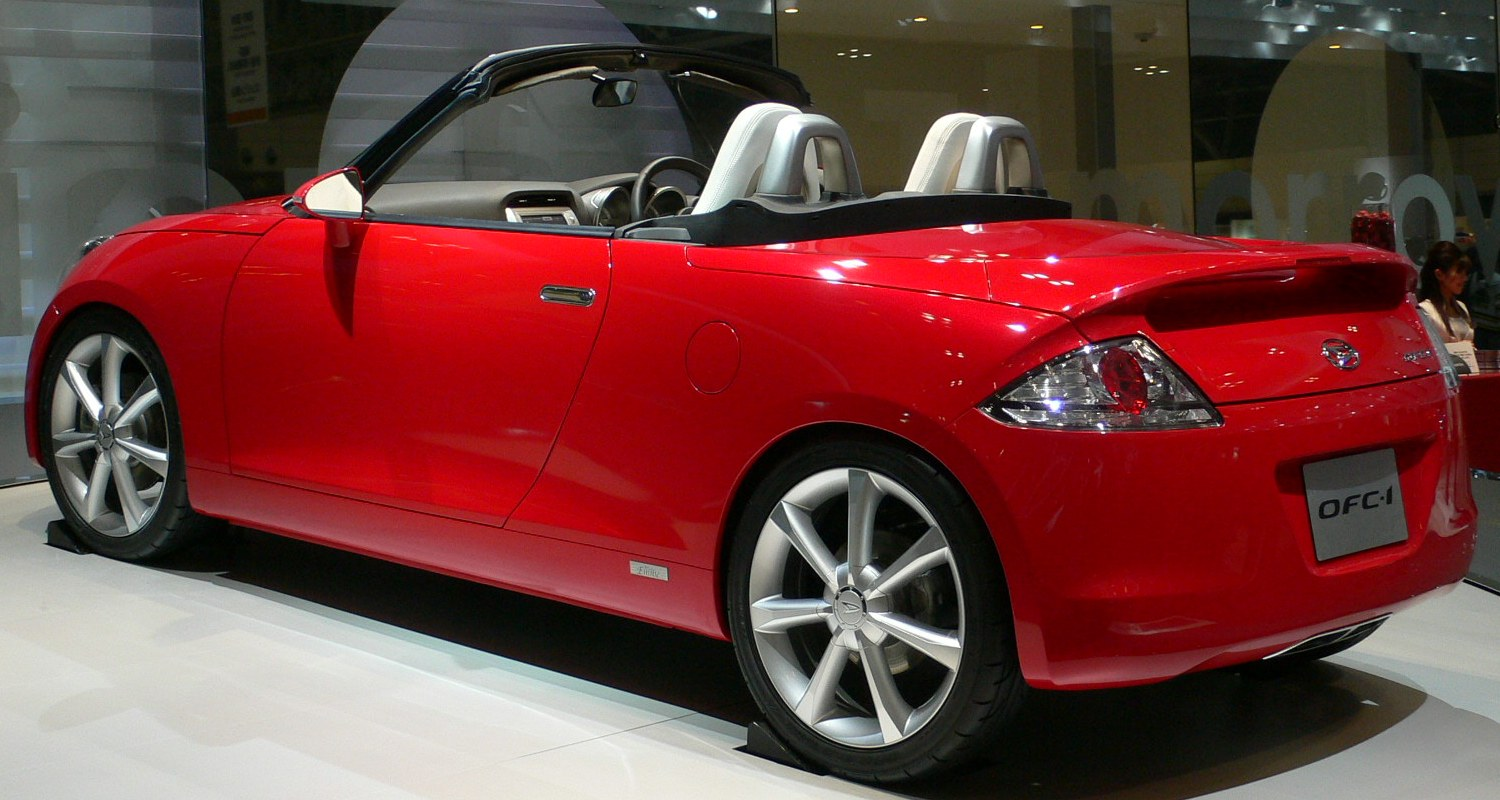
Rear view (OFC-1)

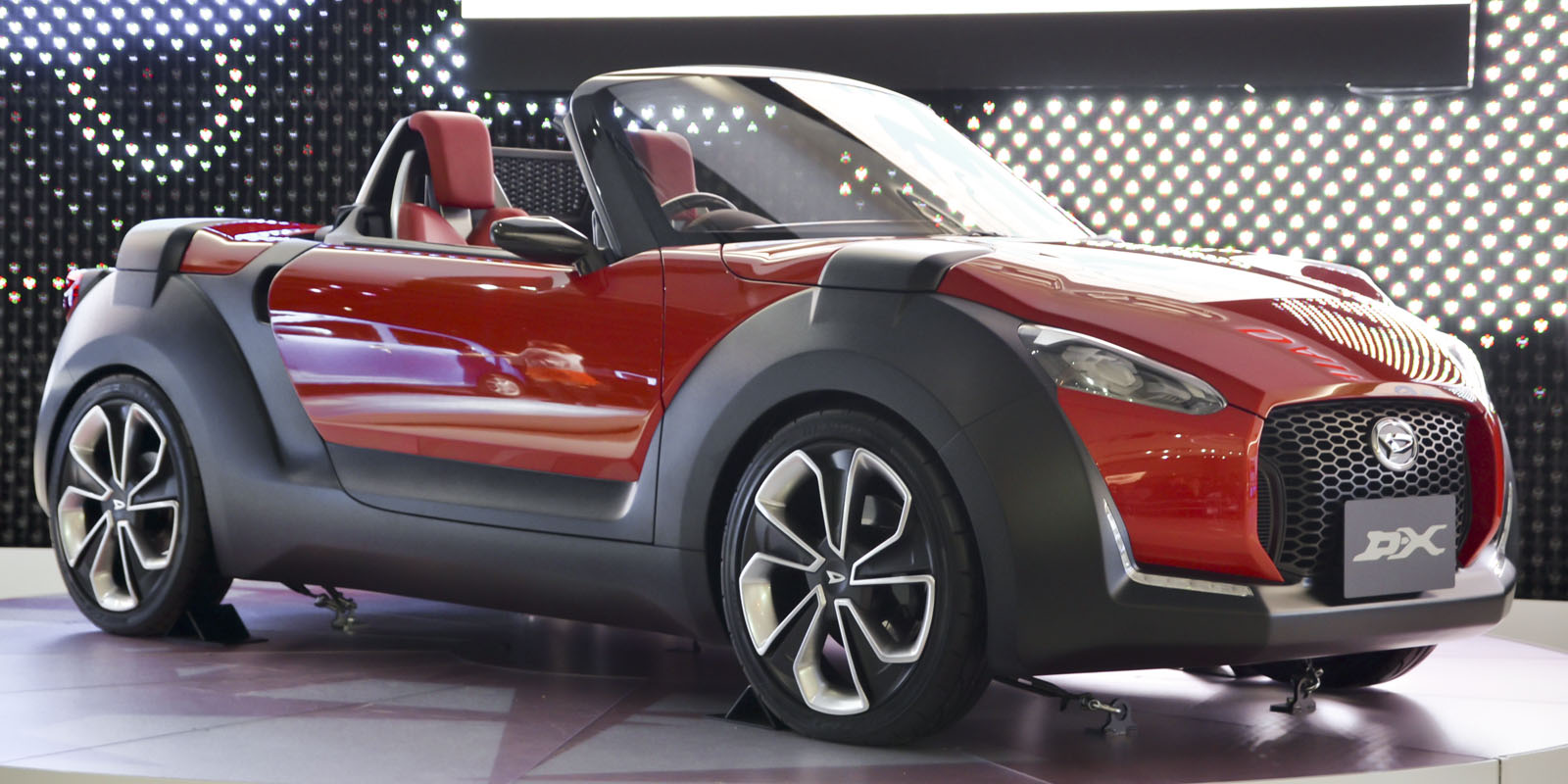
Daihatsu D-X at the 2011 Tokyo Motor Show

== Second generation (LA400; 2014) ==
Second generation
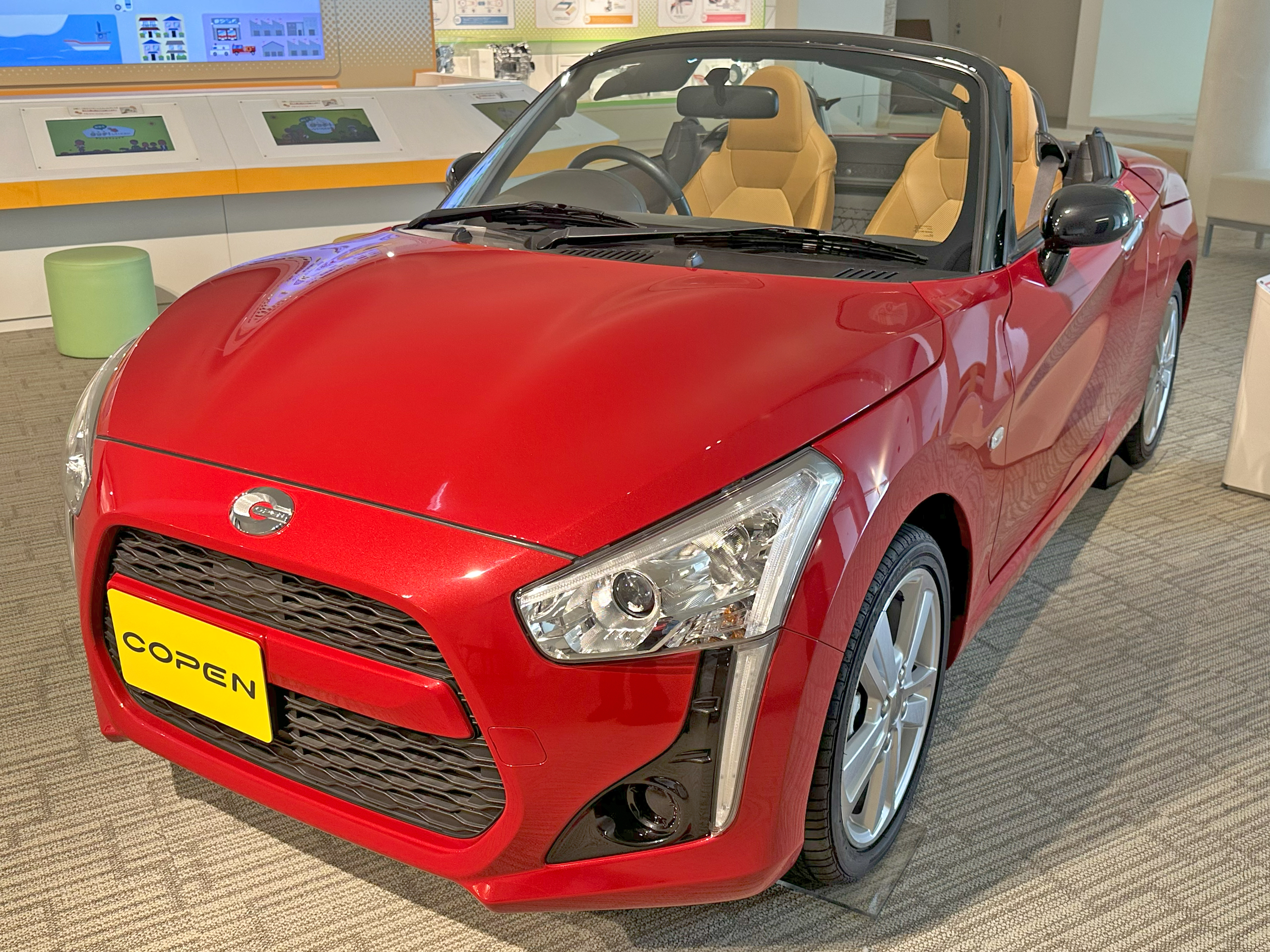
- Daihatsu Copen Robe

Overview
- Model code: LA400
- Also called: Toyota Copen GR Sport (2019–2026)
- Production: June 2014–August 2026
- Designer: Hirofumi Wada

Body and chassis
- Body style: 2-door roadster; 2-door coupé (Copen Coupe)

Powertrain
- Engine: Petrol: 658 cc KF-DET turbocharged I3
- Transmission: 5-speed manual; 7-speed Super Active Shift CVT

Dimensions
- Wheelbase: 2,230 mm (87.8 in)
- Length: 3,395 mm (133.7 in)
- Width: 1,475 mm (58.1 in)
- Height: 1,280 mm (50.4 in)
- Curb weight: 850 kg (1,874 lb) (manual); 870 kg (1,918 lb) (CVT)

Less than one year after the car's discontinuation, Daihatsu announced the Copen would be returning to production with a new model. At the 2013 Tokyo Motor Show, Daihatsu unveiled two Copen concept cars called the Kopen, with the tagline "Future Included". The name "Kopen" was a combination of kei class car, and "open" for convertible roadster. The spelling was changed from "k" to "c" for "convertible". Production of the new model was announced on 19 June 2014.

The Copen has been restyled to be more angular than its predecessor with a new monocoque chassis structure called a D-Frame. The structure allows owners to select the interior and exterior design of the car according to their preferences. The body panels are made of 13 separate resin components, 11 of which are interchangeable to modify design and colours. The Copen also features a new suspension system, a new 660cc turbo three-cylinder engine with DVVT (Dynamic Variable Valve Timing) better sounding exhaust system and weight reduction. In Japan, models sold initially were Copen XPLAY, Copen Robe and a special S for all two Copen Variants. Copen XPLAY sales was discontinued in August 2024.

For the Gran Turismo Sport video game, a specially tuned model called the Daihatsu Copen RJ Vision Gran Turismo was included as part of the series' Vision Gran Turismo program of concept cars.

In June 2015, a factory option called the Dress Formation was added. The Dress Formation involves using 12 exterior parts, including the headlights and taillights—to transform the vehicle into the Copen Cero or Robe. The "Dress-Formation" allows for easy design changes by swapping out exterior components. Options to modify only the front or rear fascia are also available.

On 29 September 2025, Toyota announced that it would end production of the Copen GR Sport, a light open sports car that it sells under an OEM agreement with Daihatsu, in August 2026. Production the second generation Copen was ceased on 26 August 2026, when the final unit a Copen Robe finished in Jaune Yellow rolled off the production line in Copen Factory, Ikeda. Daihatsu claimed around 57,000 units L400's were produced.

=== Variants ===
==== Copen Robe ====
Base grade which was released in June 2014. The name "Robe" means from the French word for clothing, attire, or dress.

The Copen Robe was officially exported to Indonesia and launched in June 2015. Previously, the Copen was exhibited at the 2014 IIMS exhibition. Sales stopped in early 2019.

In December 2014, a sportier variant called the Robe S was added. Features a BBS forged 16-inch aluminium wheel, and MOMO leather steering wheel.

==== Copen Cero ====
On 18 June 2015, Daihatsu launched the Copen Cero; with its round headlights and taillights it is similar in form to the first-generation model.

==== Copen Coupe ====
The Copen Coupe was first unveiled at Tokyo Auto Saloon 2016 as a concept car.

At the 2019 Tokyo Auto Salon, Daihatsu unveiled the Copen Coupe, a fixed-roof coupé version of the Copen Cero. The CFRP roof features an optional sunroof. Standard features include a Momo leather wrapped steering wheel, limited-slip differential, BBS aluminum wheels, and serialized plates on the centre console. Options include a sports muffler and HKS suspension. Daihatsu produced a limited run of 200 units in April 2019 to coincide with the fifth anniversary of the second generation Copen.

==== Copen GR Sport ====
The Copen GR Sport went on sale on 15 October 2019. It is sold under both Daihatsu and Toyota dealership networks (as the Toyota Copen GR Sport). This variant neither carries a Daihatsu nor Toyota logo, a neutral oval-shaped 'C' Copen logo is used instead for the front and rear badging. The Copen GR Sport gets sporty exterior looks with BBS wheels, a Momo-branded steering wheel and a specially tuned suspension for body rigidity.

=== Gallery ===
Concept model

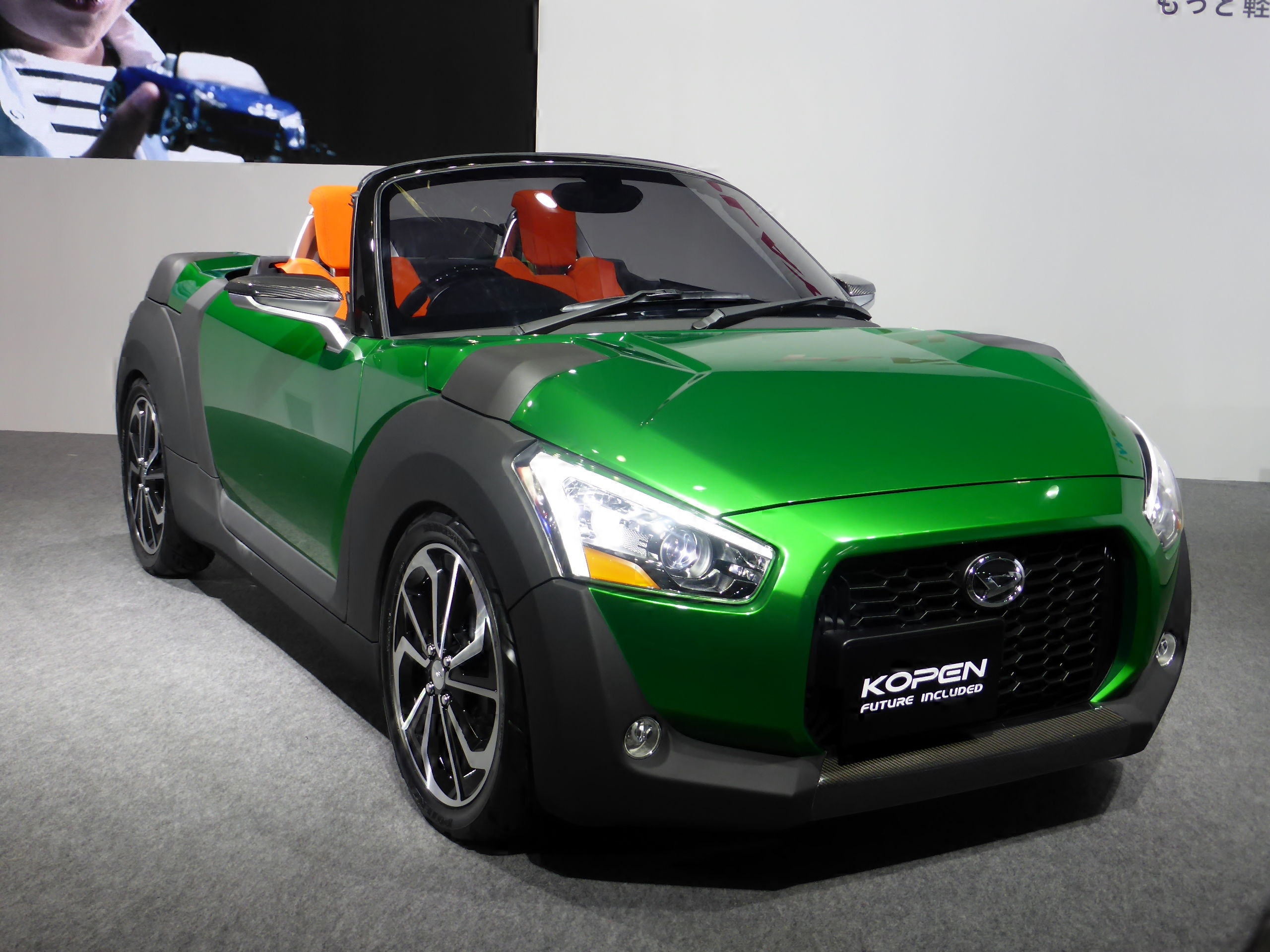
2013 Daihatsu Kopen Future Included XMZ

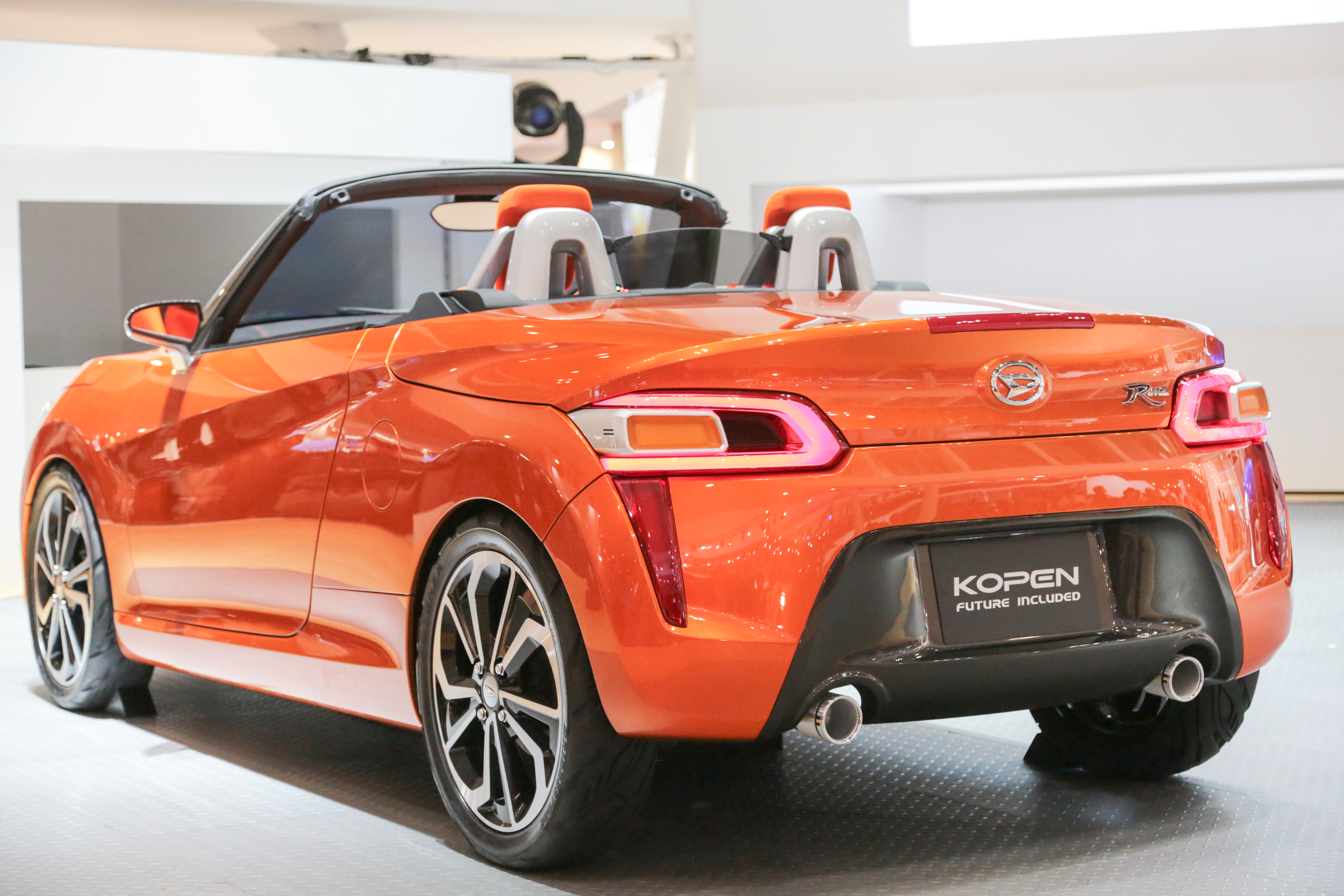
2013 Daihatsu Kopen Future Included XMZ (rear view)

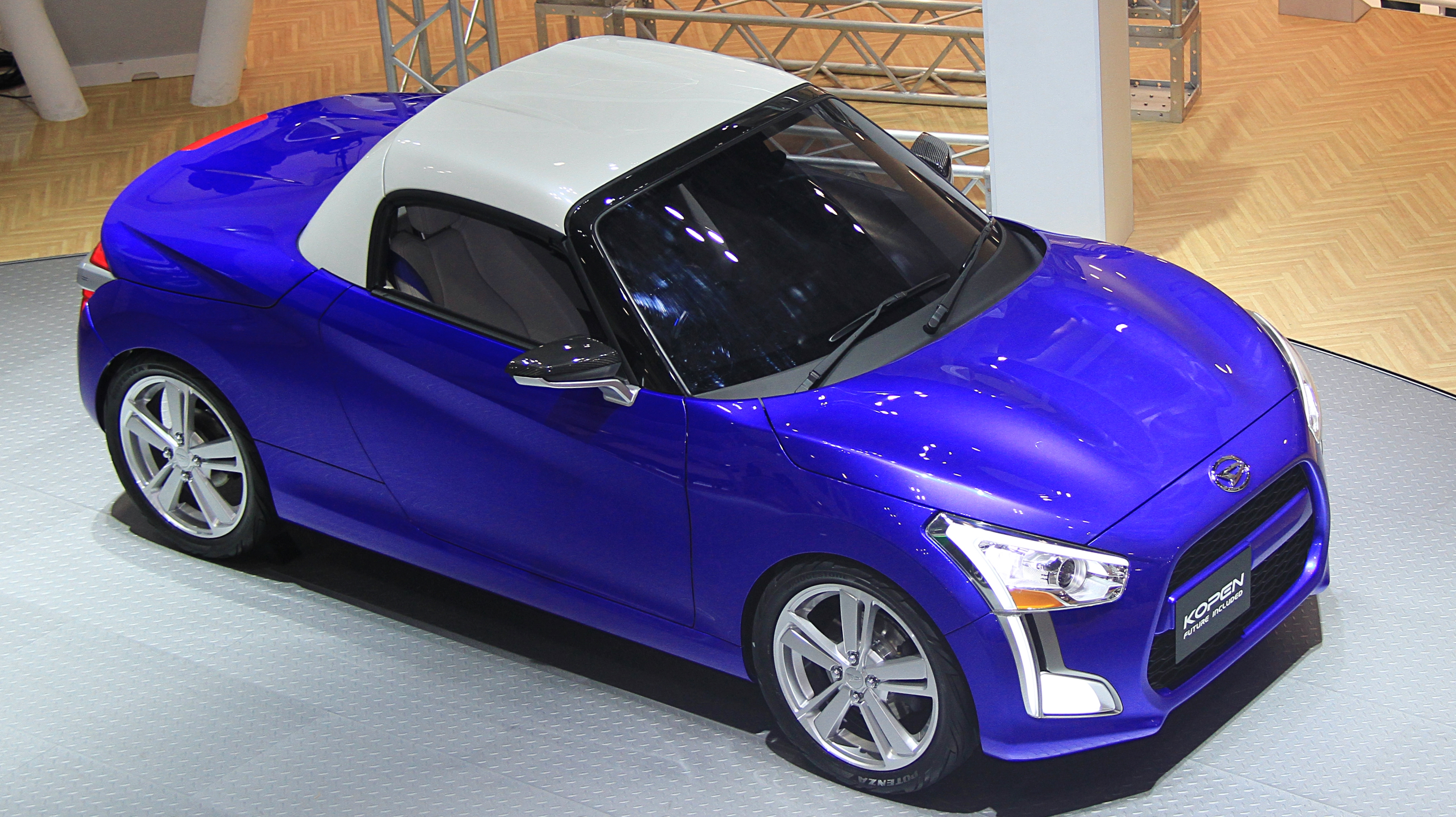
2013 Daihatsu Kopen Future Included RMZ

Copen Robe

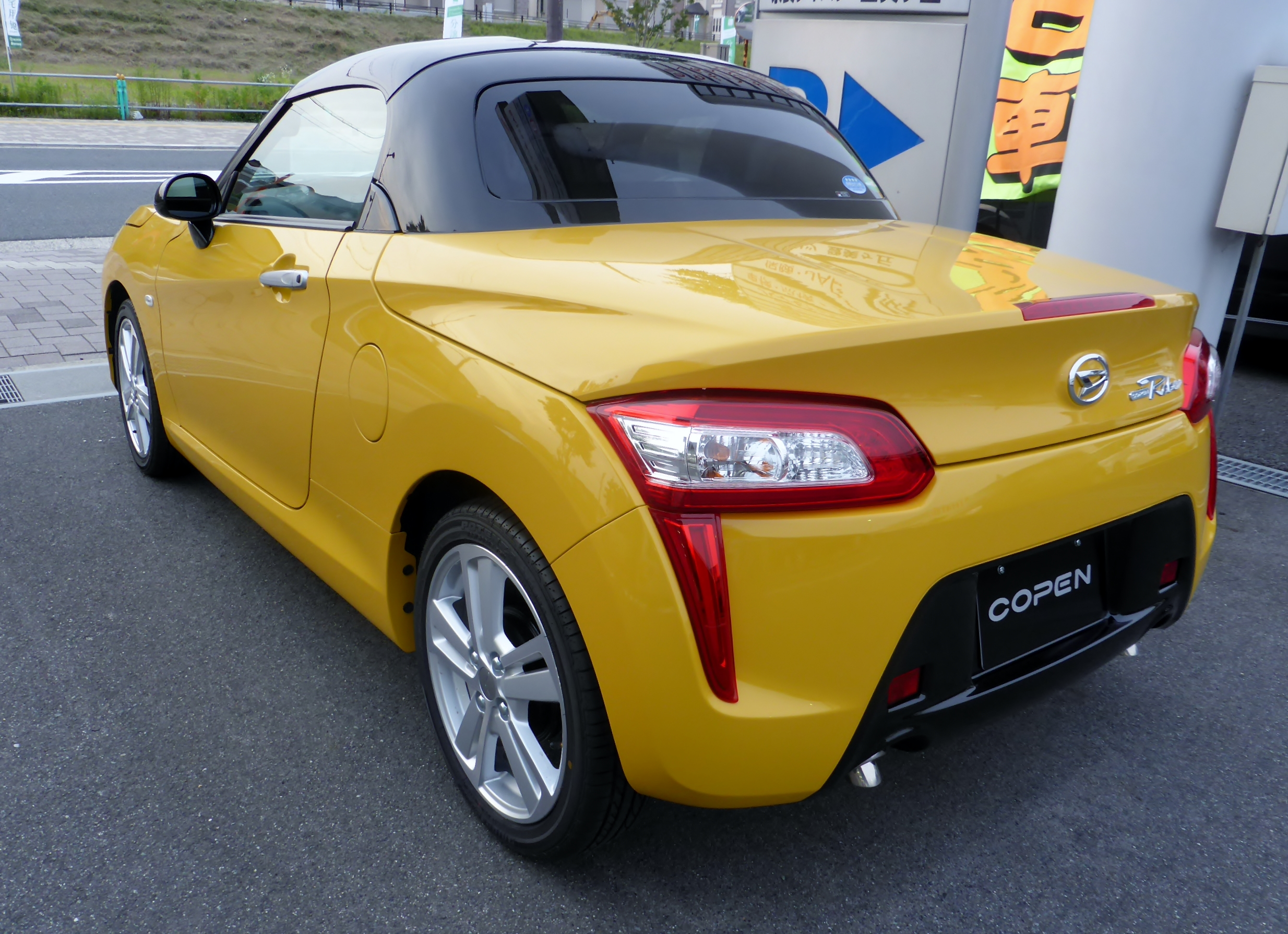
Copen Robe rear view

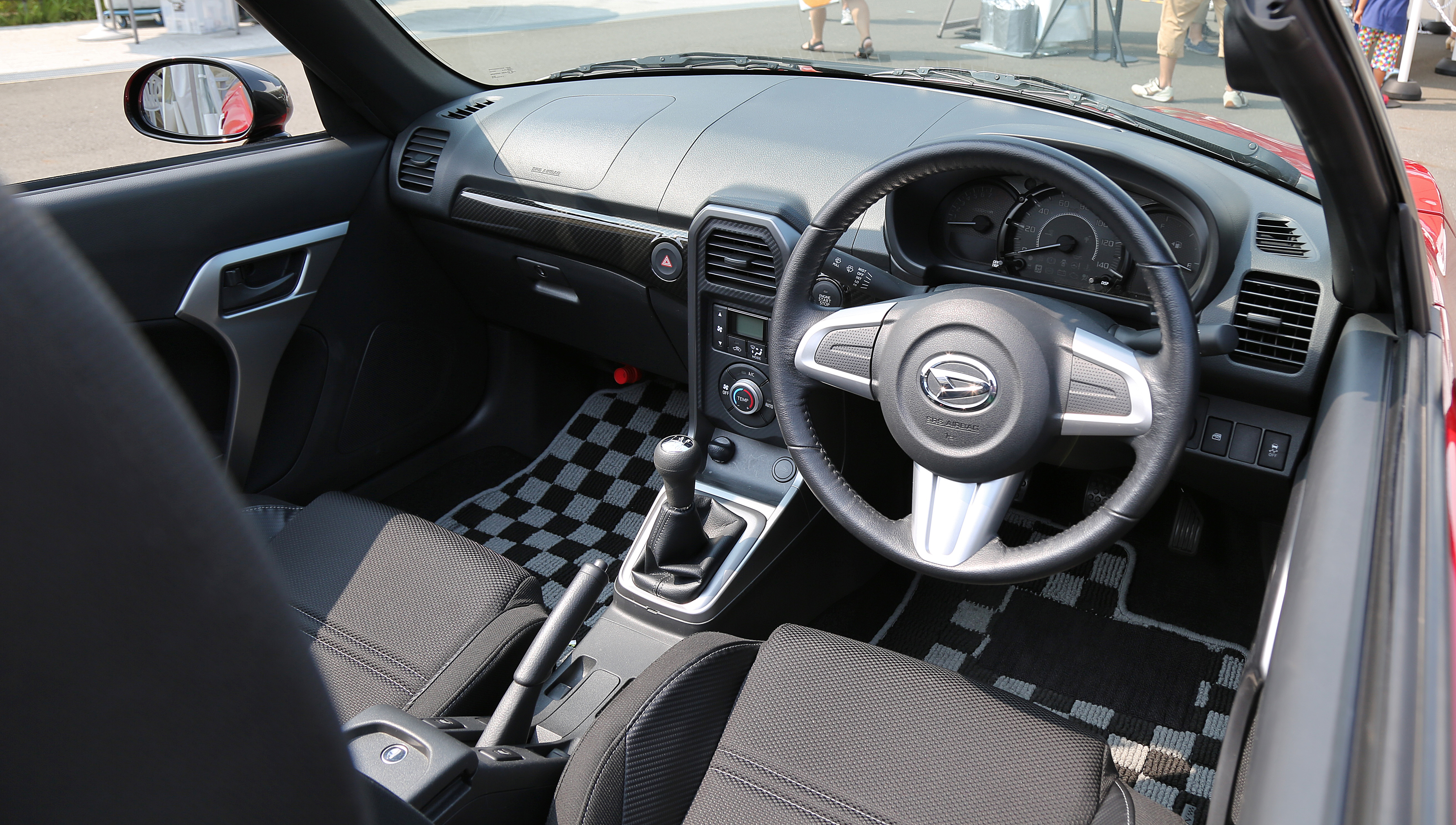
Copen Robe interior

Copen XPLAY

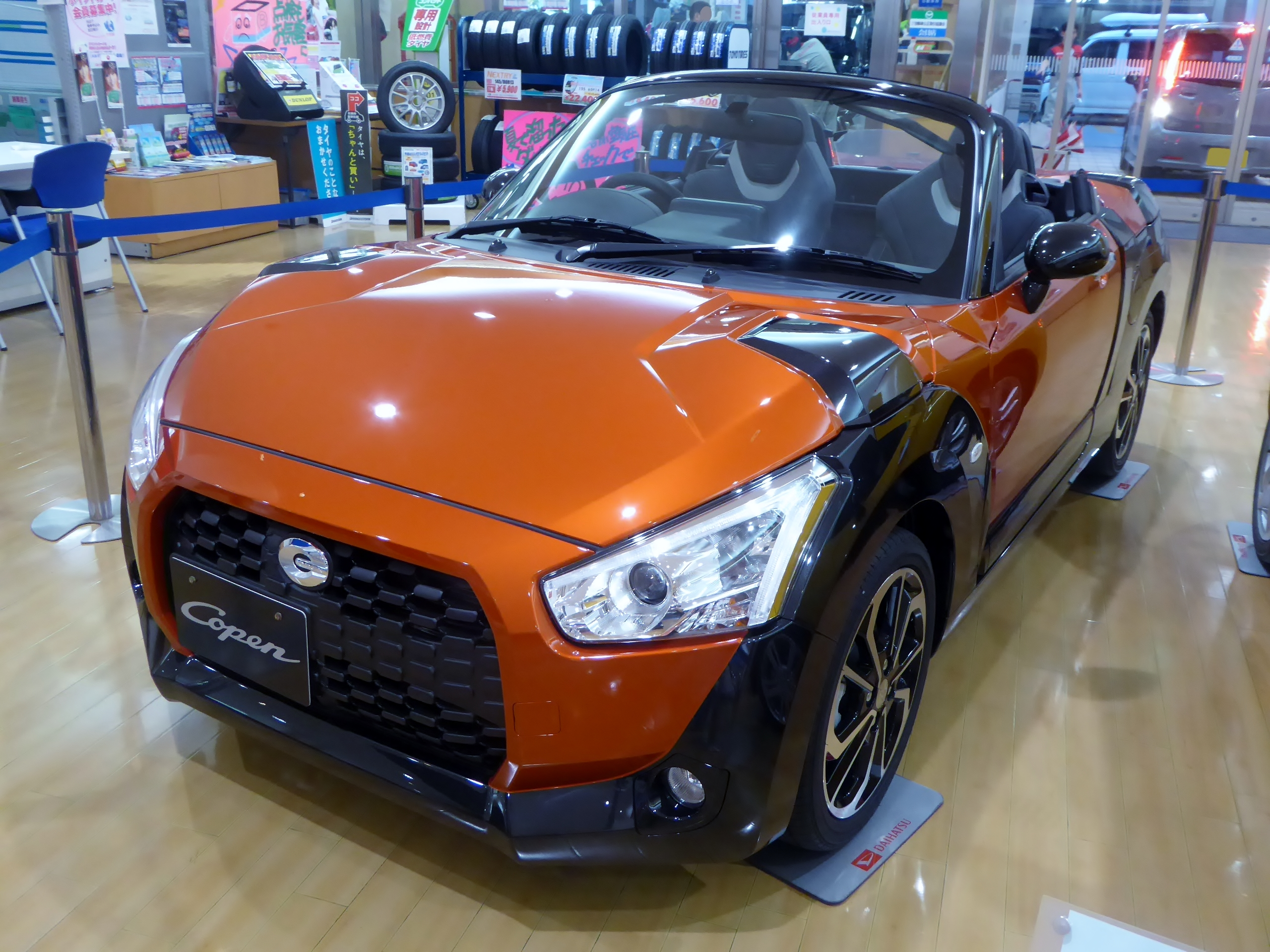
Daihatsu Copen XPLAY S

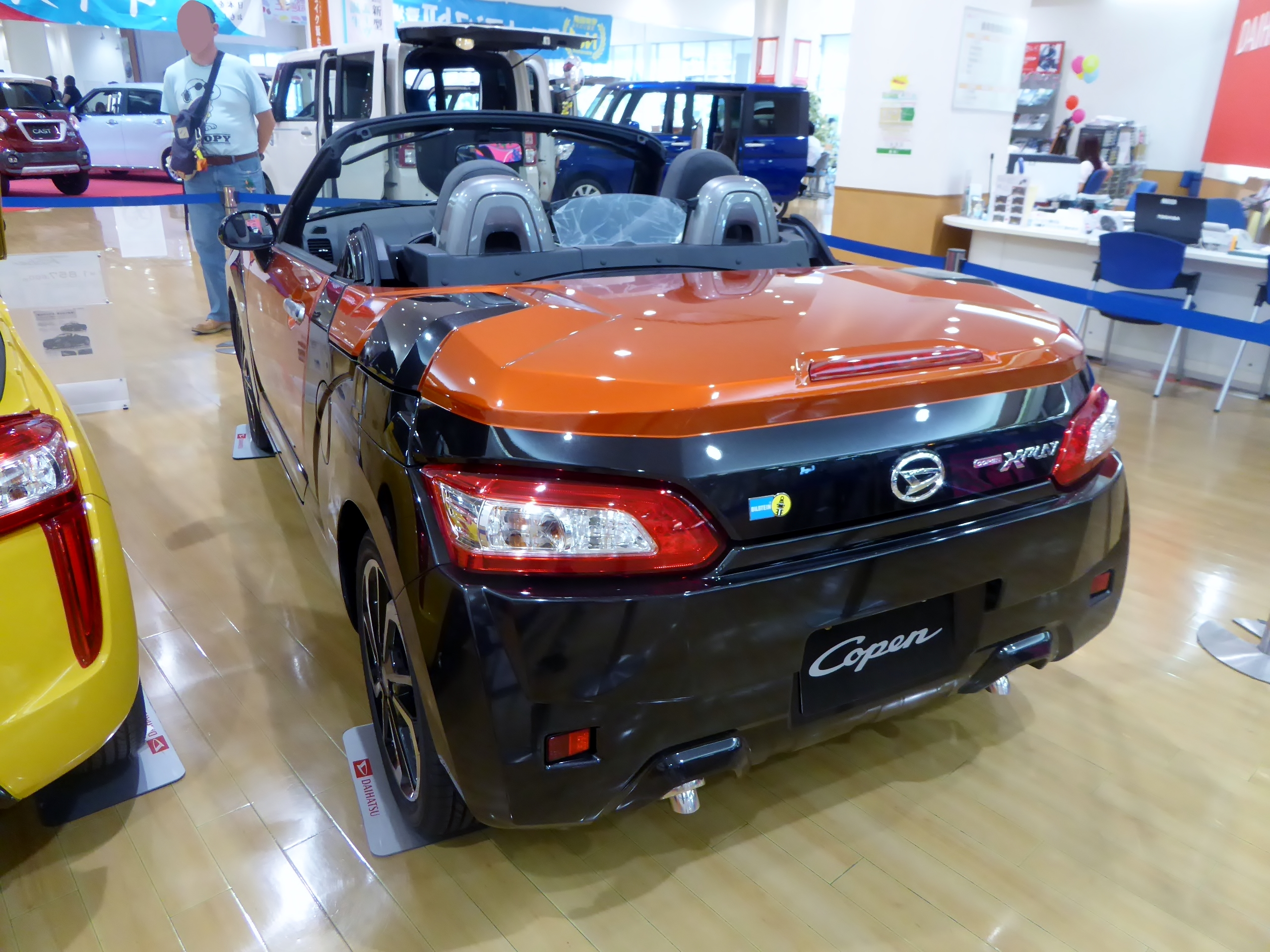
Copen XPLAY S rear view

Copen Cero/Copen Coupe

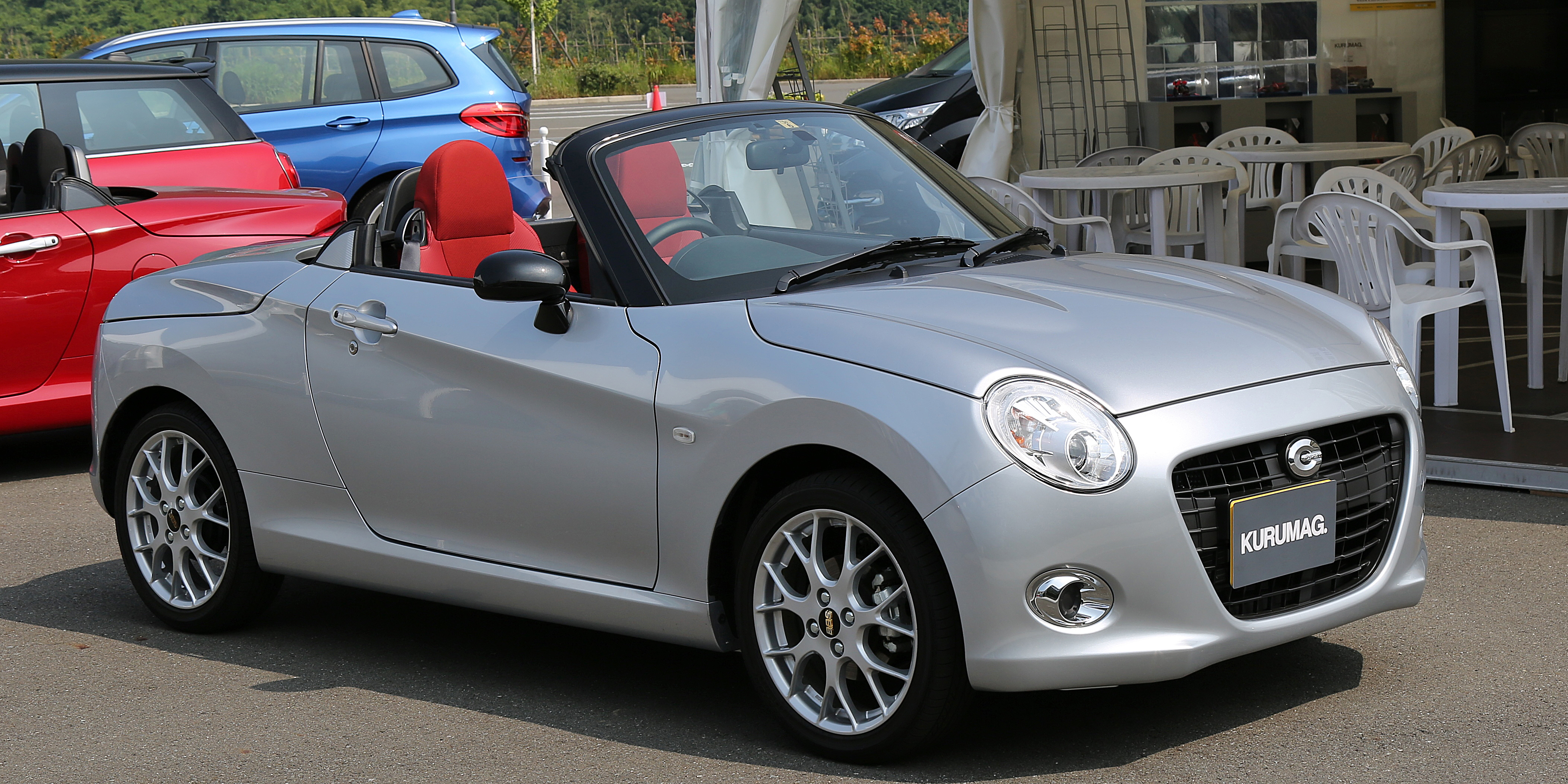
Daihatsu Copen Cero

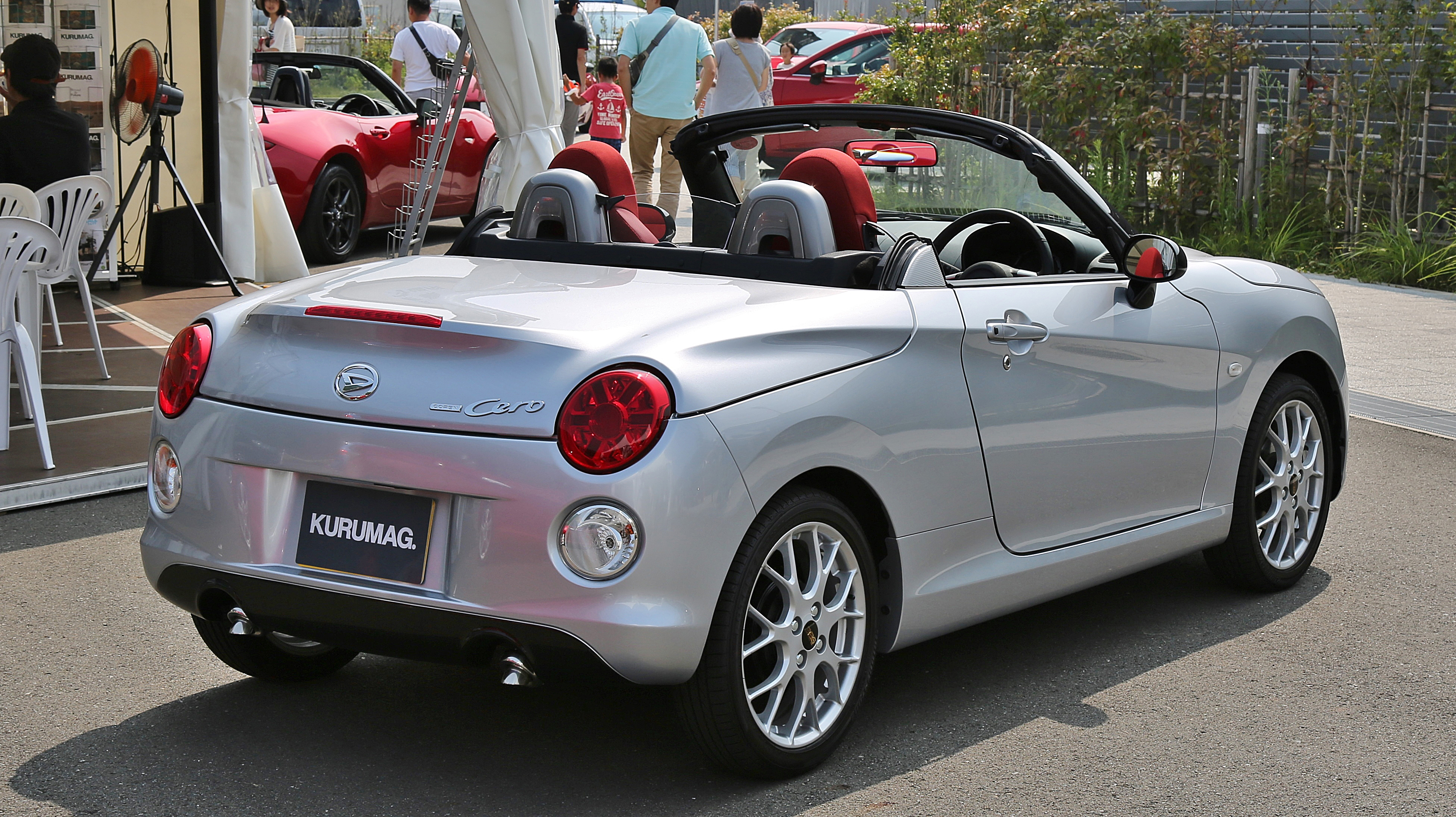
Copen Cero rear view

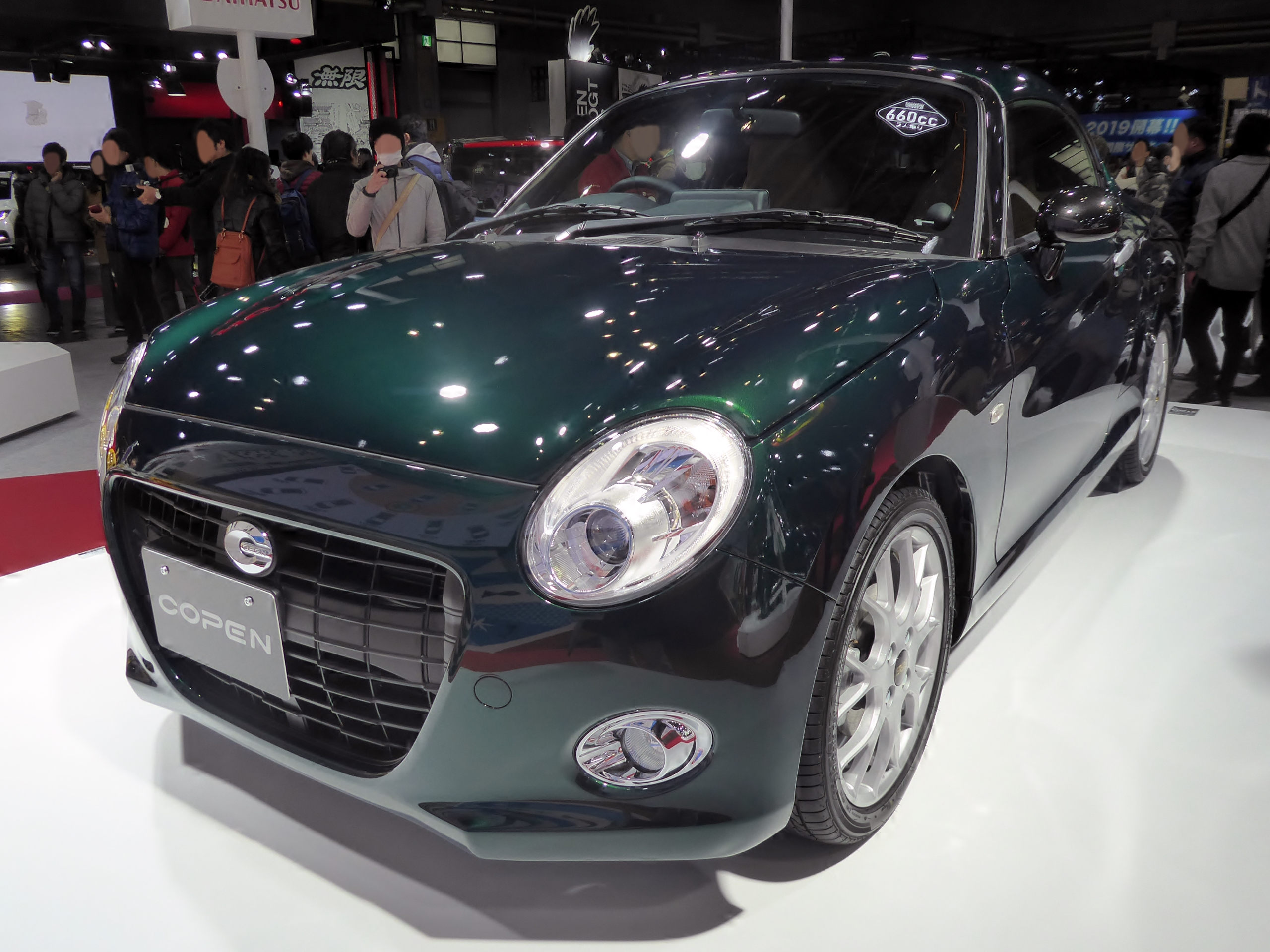
Daihatsu Copen Coupe

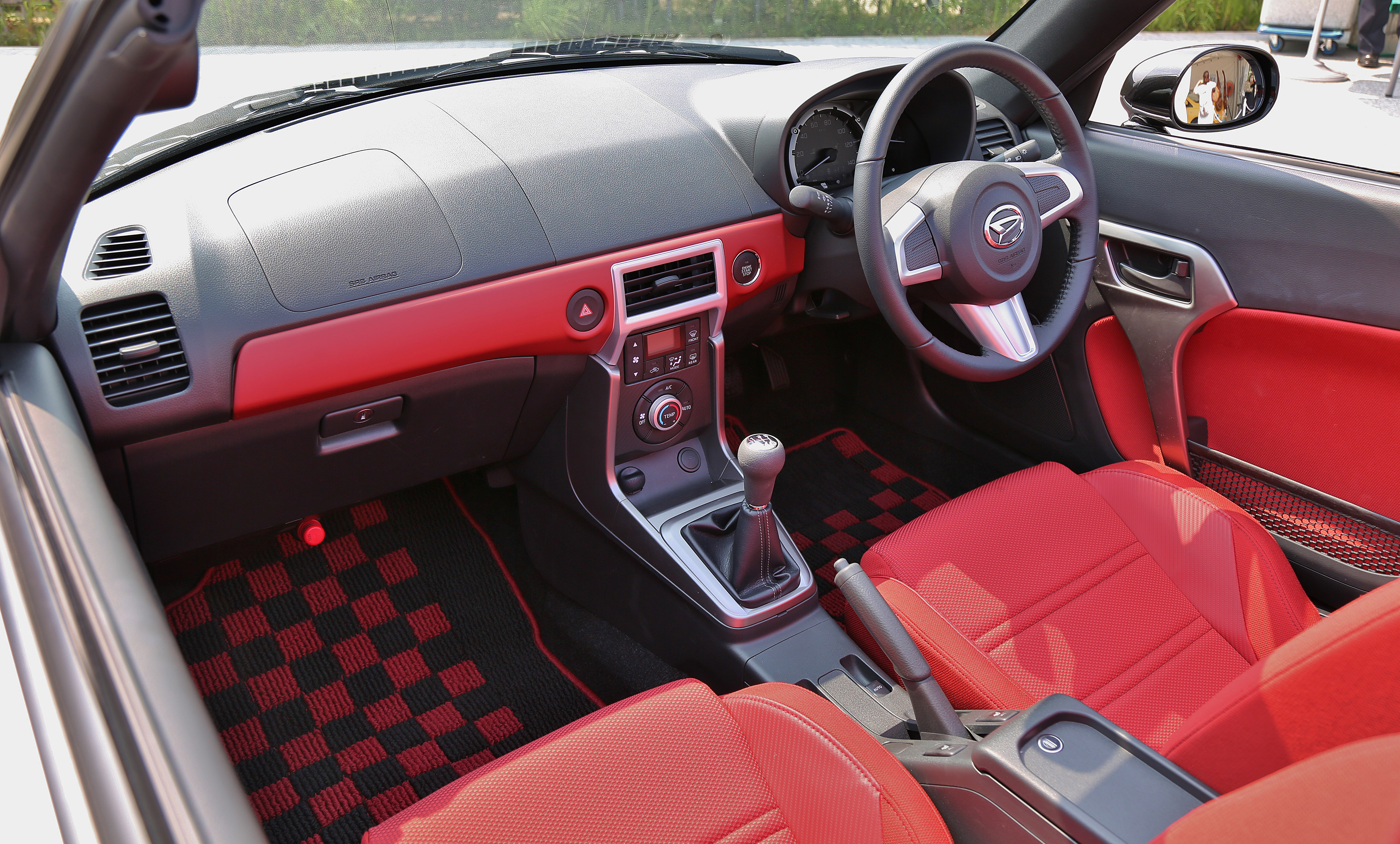
Copen Cero interior

GR Sport

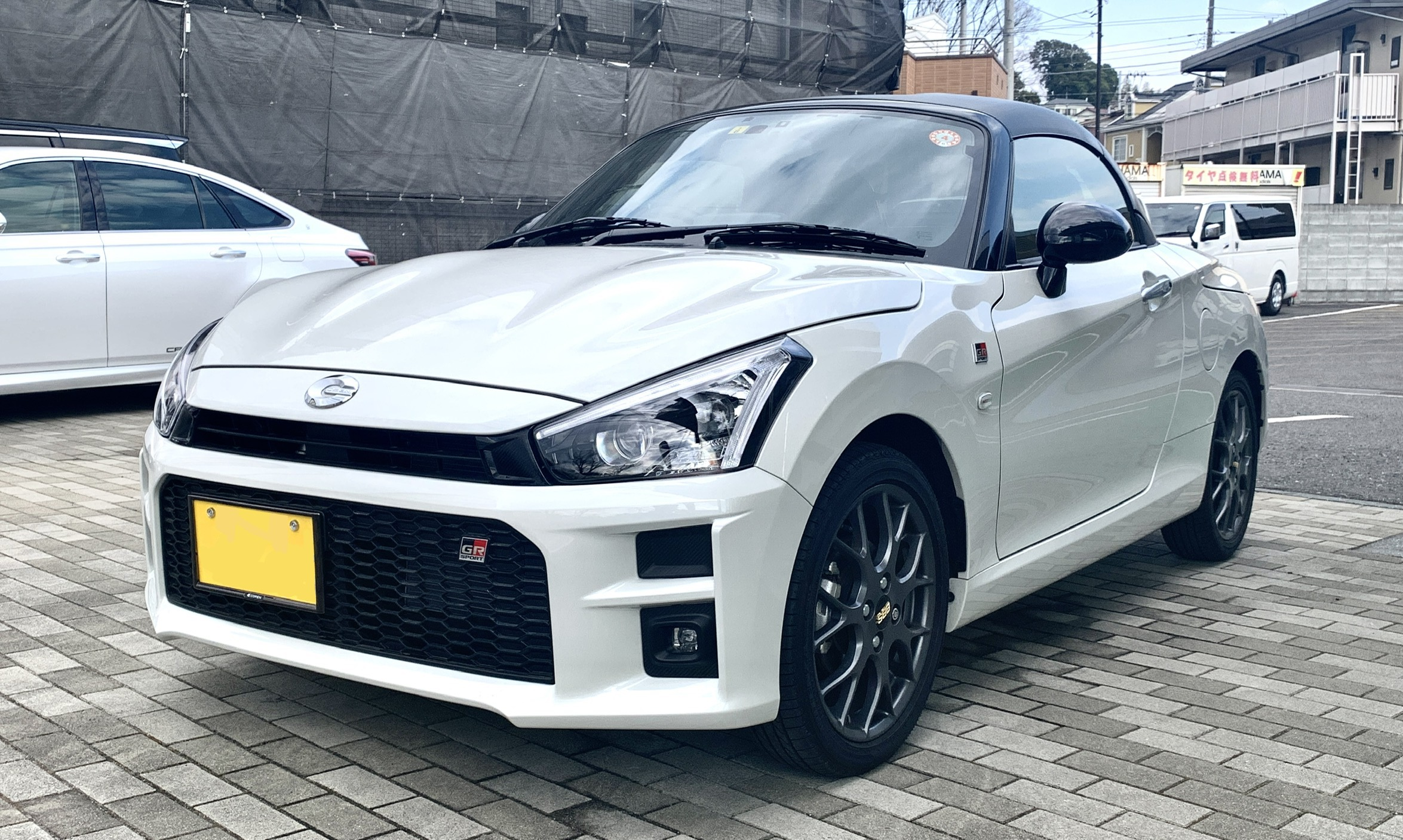
Daihatsu Copen GR Sport

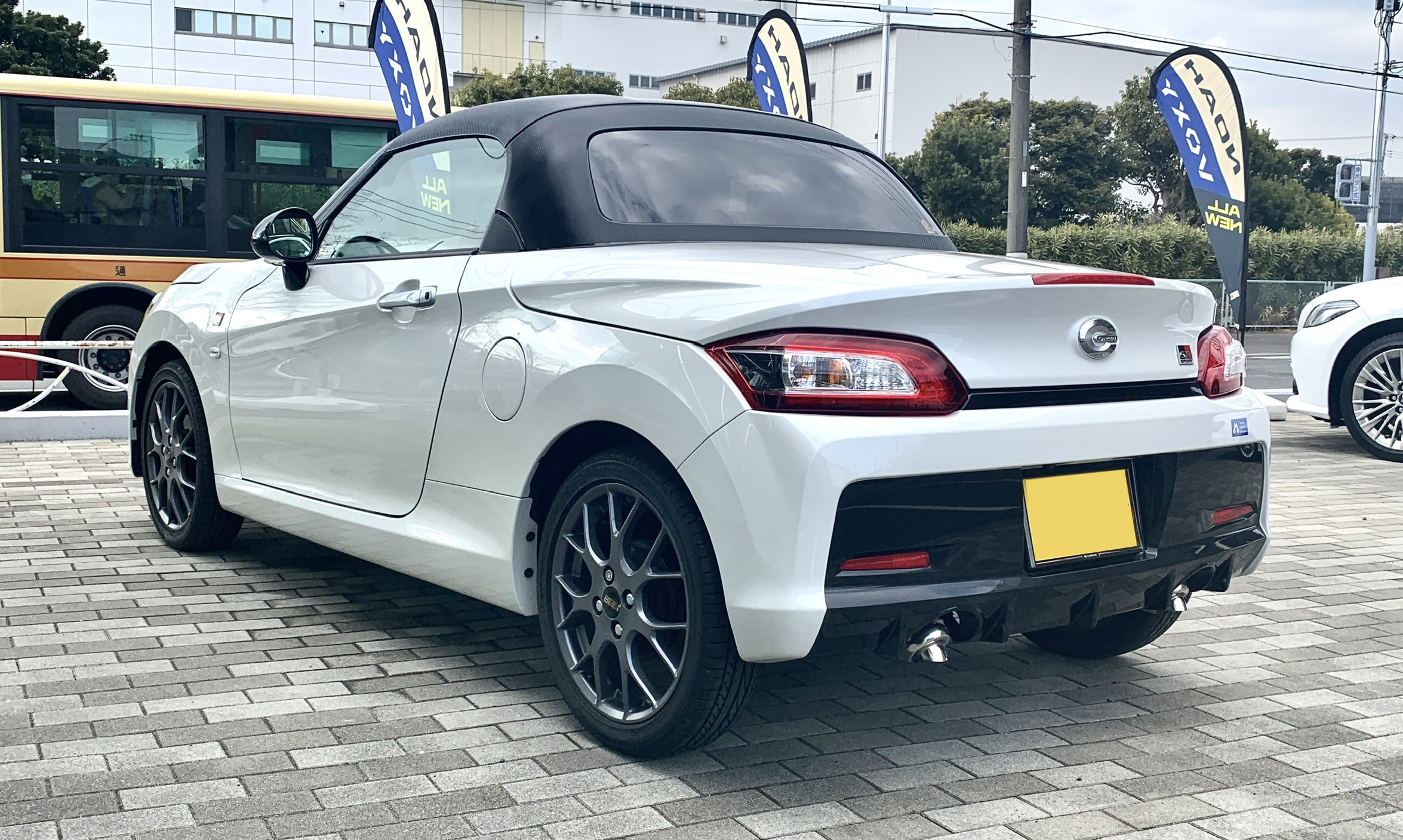
Copen GR Sport (rear view)

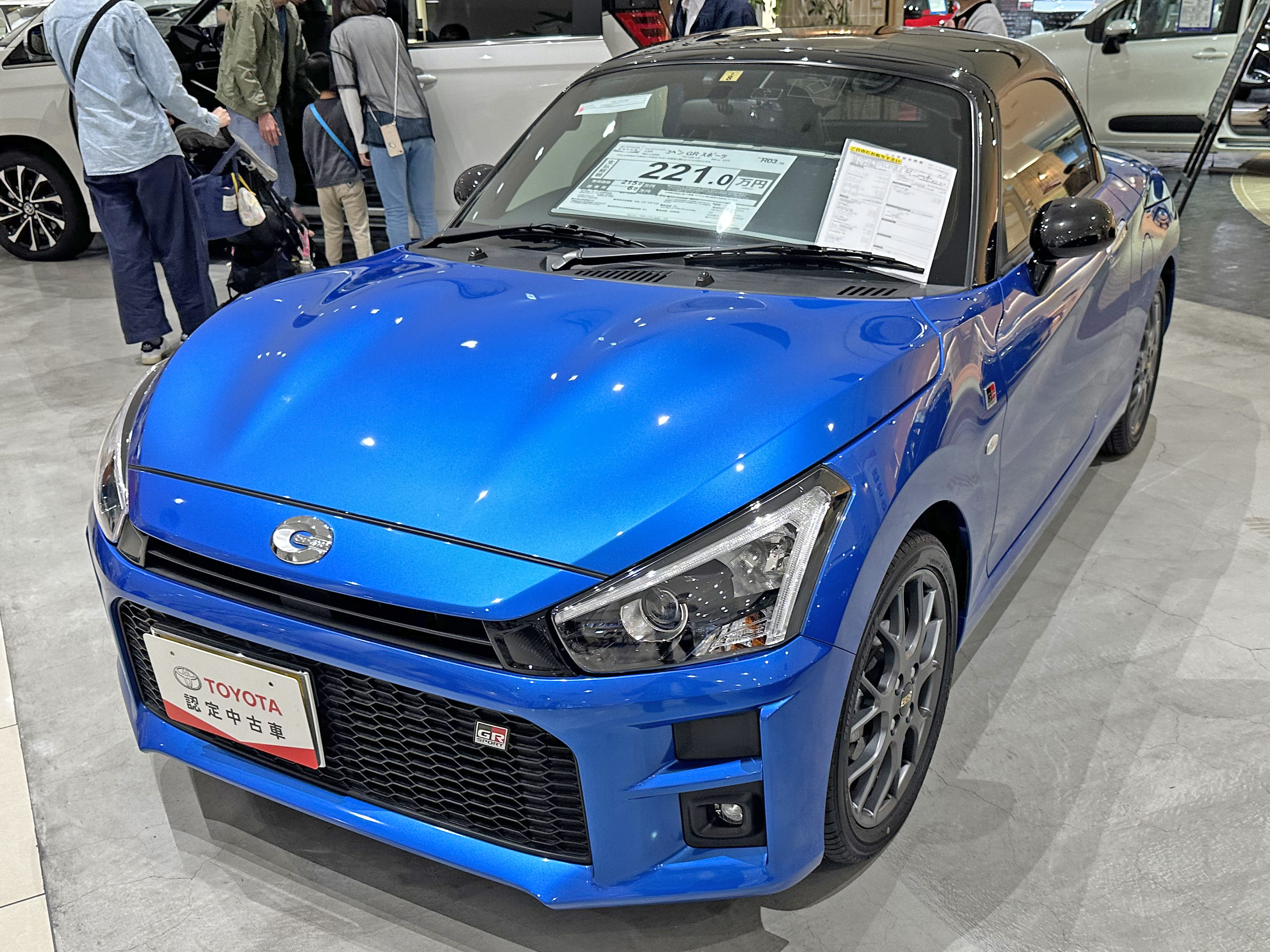
Toyota Copen GR Sport

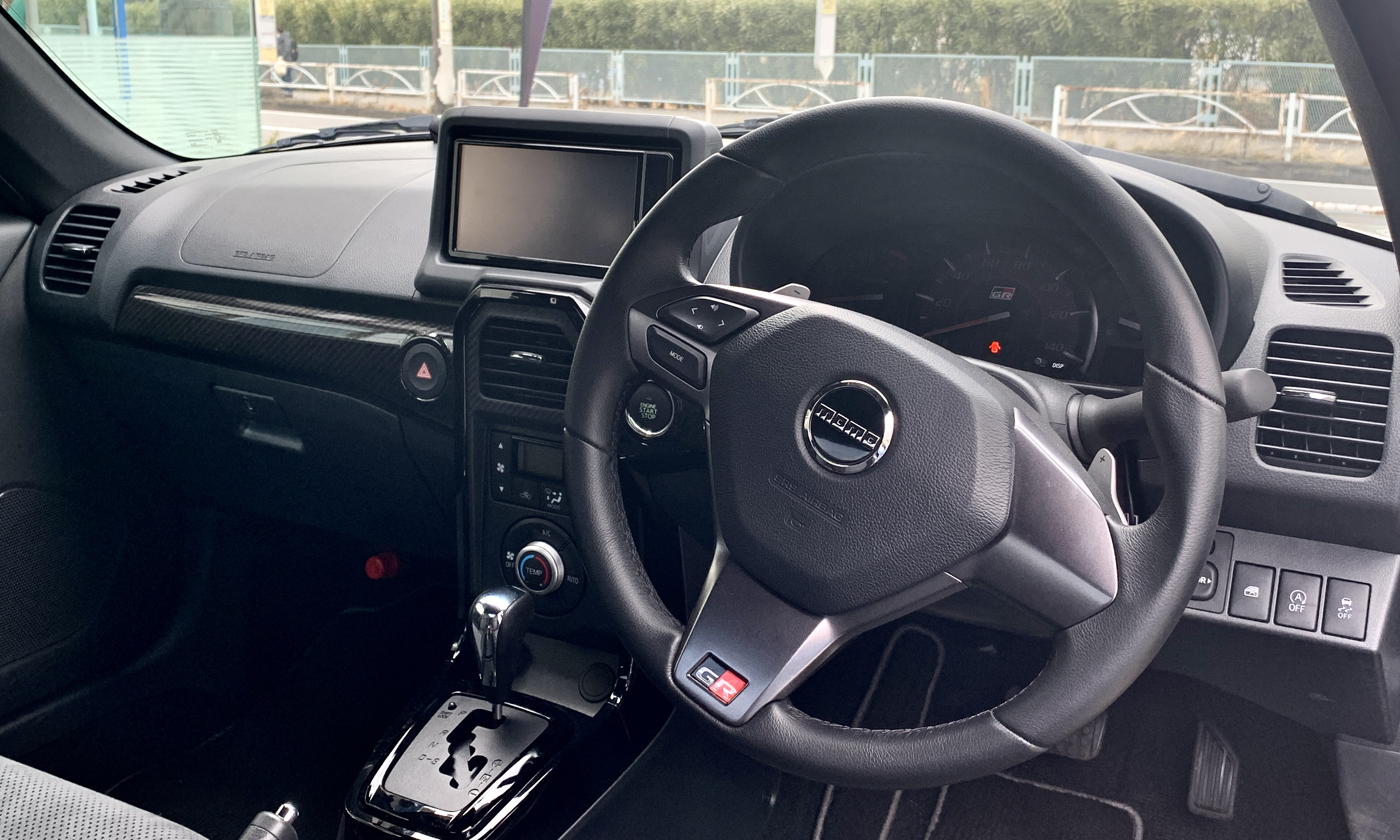
Copen GR Sport interior

=== Concept cars ===
At the 2016 Tokyo Auto Salon, Daihatsu unveiled the three body styles; Cero Coupe, Shooting Brake, and the more rugged Adventure. The Shooting Brake was very identical of the Daihatsu DR which was unveiled at the 2012 Indonesia International Motor Show. The Cero Coupe was entered to production in 2019 as the limited production model.

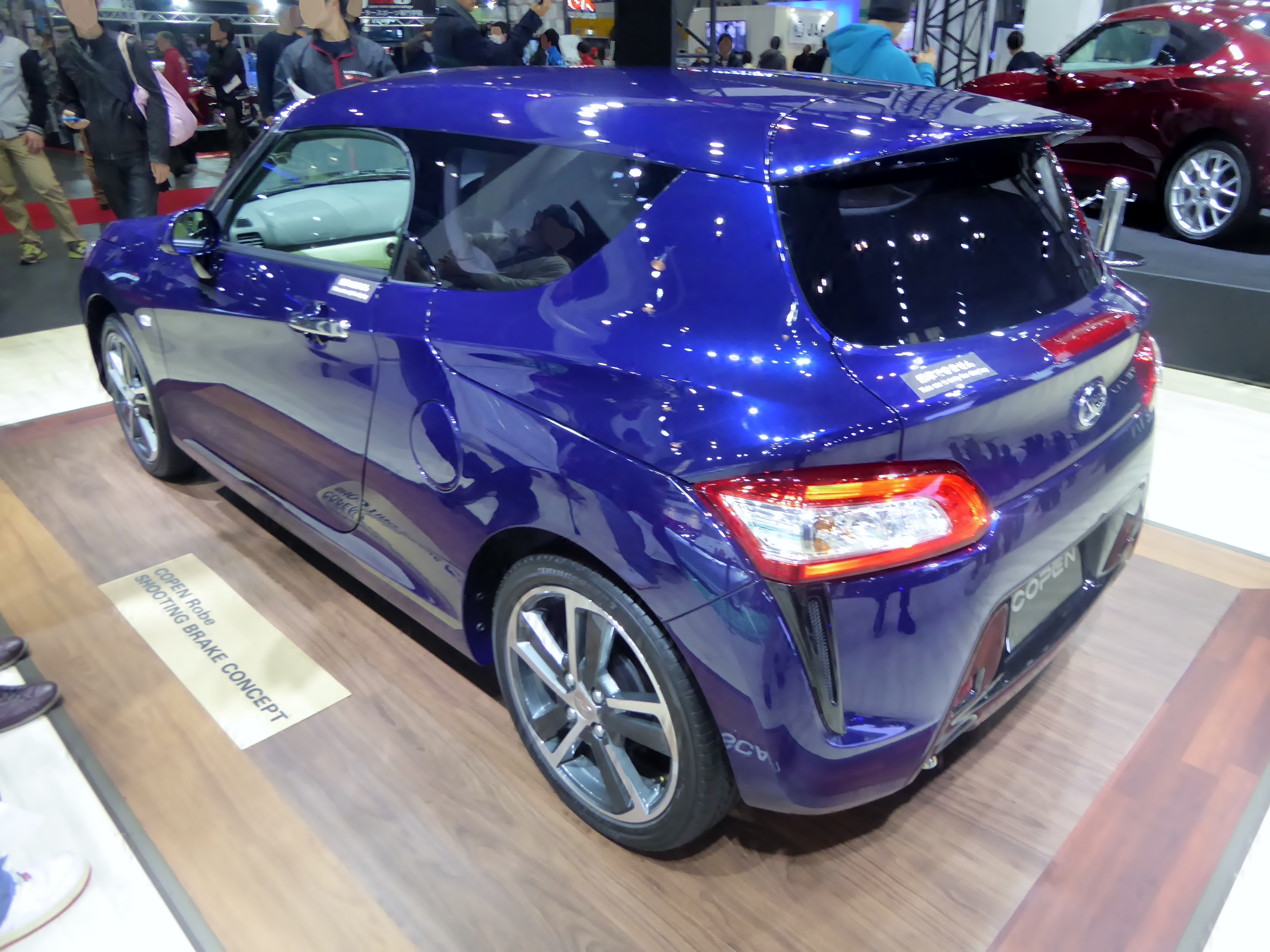
Daihatsu Copen Shooting Brake

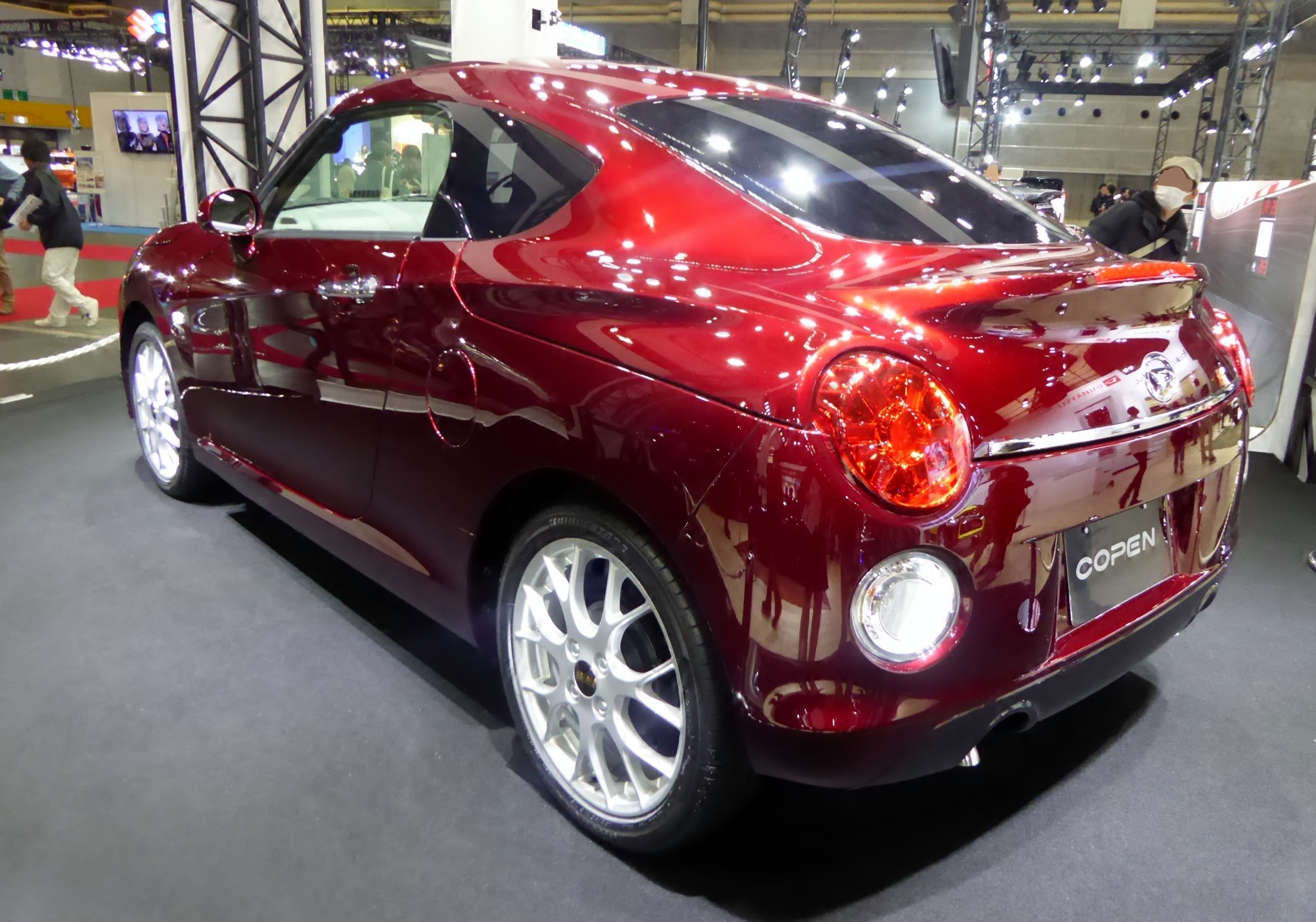
Daihatsu Copen Cero Coupe

== Specifications ==
=== 2002–2012 Japanese and international markets ===
JB-DETi engine

- 0.66L (659 cc) 16 valves turbo DOHC 4 cylinder
- Power — 47 kW (64 PS; 63 hp) @ 6000 rpm
- Power — 50 kW (68 PS; 67 hp) @ 6000 rpm for UK market
- Torque — 110 N⋅m (81 lb⋅ft) @ 3200 rpm
- Torque — 100 N⋅m (74 lb⋅ft) for UK market
- Top speed — 170 km/h (110 mph) UK version (MT)
- Top speed — 167 km/h (104 mph) Japanese version (MT)
- Top speed — 162 km/h (101 mph) UK version (AT)
- Top speed — 159 km/h (99 mph) Japanese version (AT)
- Combined fuel consumption — 5.4 L/100 km (52 mpg_{‑imp}; 44 mpg_{‑US})
- 0–62 mph time — 11.7s (MT)

=== 2006–2011 international markets, not available in Japan ===
K3-VE engine

- 1.3L DVVT engine DOHC 16 valve
- Power — 64 kW (87 PS; 86 hp) @ 6000 rpm
- Torque — 120 N⋅m (89 lb⋅ft) @ 4400 rpm
- Top speed — 180 km/h (110 mph) (MT)
- Top speed — 172 km/h (107 mph) (AT)
- Combined fuel consumption — 6 L/100 km (47 mpg_{‑imp}; 39 mpg_{‑US})
- 0–100 km/h (0–62 mph) time — 9.5s (MT)

=== 2014–2026 Japanese market model ===
KF engine

- 658cc 3 cylinder 12-valve DOHC intercooled turbocharged
- Compression ratio — 9.5
- Power — 47 kW (64 PS; 63 hp) at 6400 rpm
- Torque — 92 N⋅m (68 lb⋅ft) at 3200 rpm
- Combined fuel consumption — 4.5 L/100 km (63 mpg_{‑imp}; 52 mpg_{‑US}) (MT) or 4 L/100 km (71 mpg_{‑imp}; 59 mpg_{‑US}) (AT)

Transmission

- Manual — KPMZ 5-speed with ratios 3.181, 1.842, 1.250, 0.916, and 0.750. Final reduction, 5.545. Tires: 165/50R16.
- Automatic — KBPZ CVT with ratio 3.327 to 0.628. Final reduction, 4.800. Tires: 165/50R16.

Body

- Layout — Front-engine, front-wheel-drive
- Weight — 850 kg (MT) or 870 kg (AT)
- Wheelbase — 2,230 mm (88 in)

== Vision Copen (2023) ==
The Vision Copen is a concept car showcased at the 2023 Japan Mobility Show. According to Daihatsu, it is powered by a carbon-neutral 1.3-litre engine. The extrerior of the Vision Copen closely resembles the first generation Copen.

As a lightweight two-seater sports car, the car measures 3,835 mm (151.0 in) in length, 1,695 mm (66.7 in) in width, and 1,265 mm (49.8 in) in height, significantly larger than the existing Copen as the convertible kei car. As with existing Copen models, the Active Top System remains available.

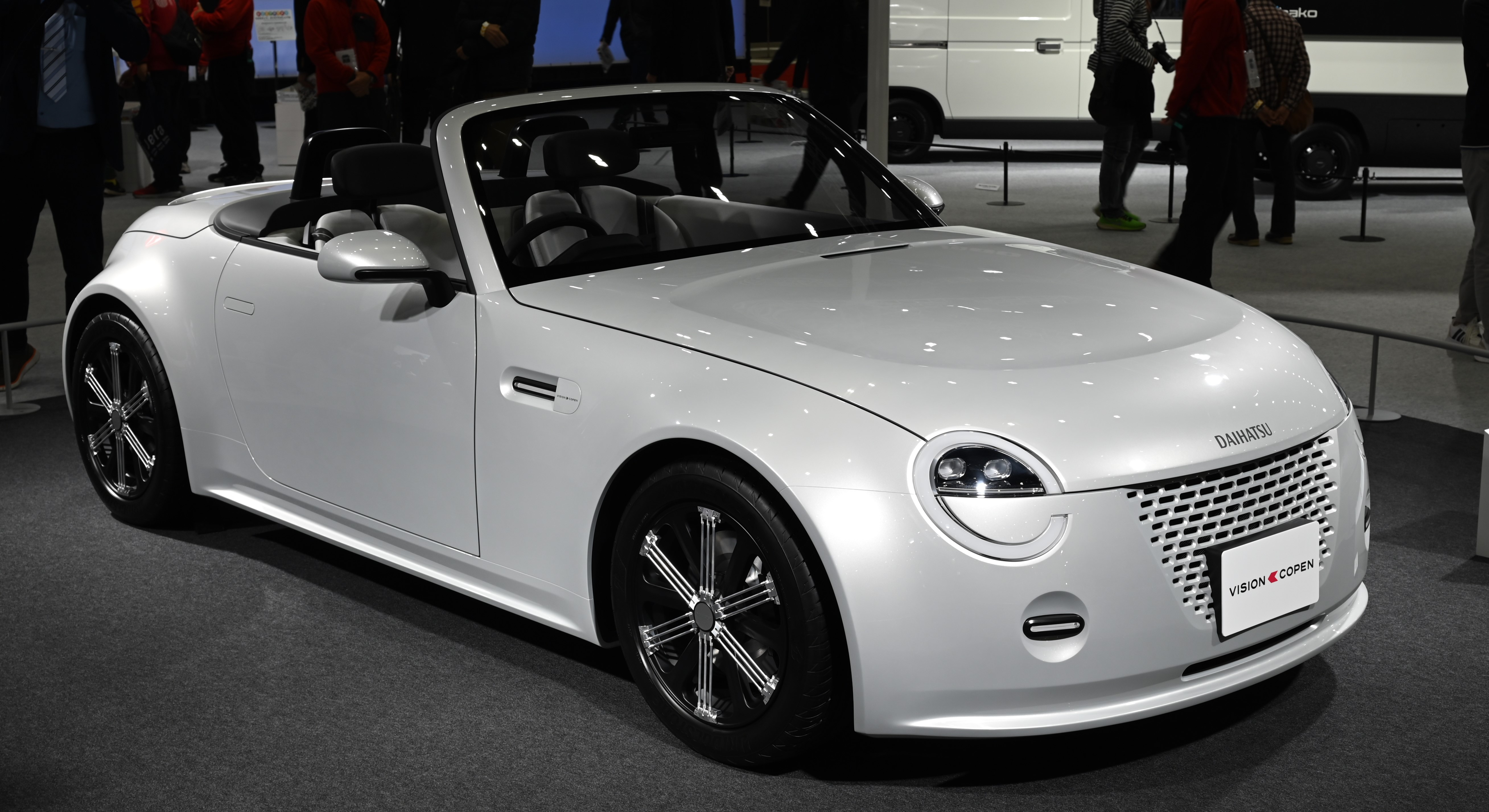
Vision Copen

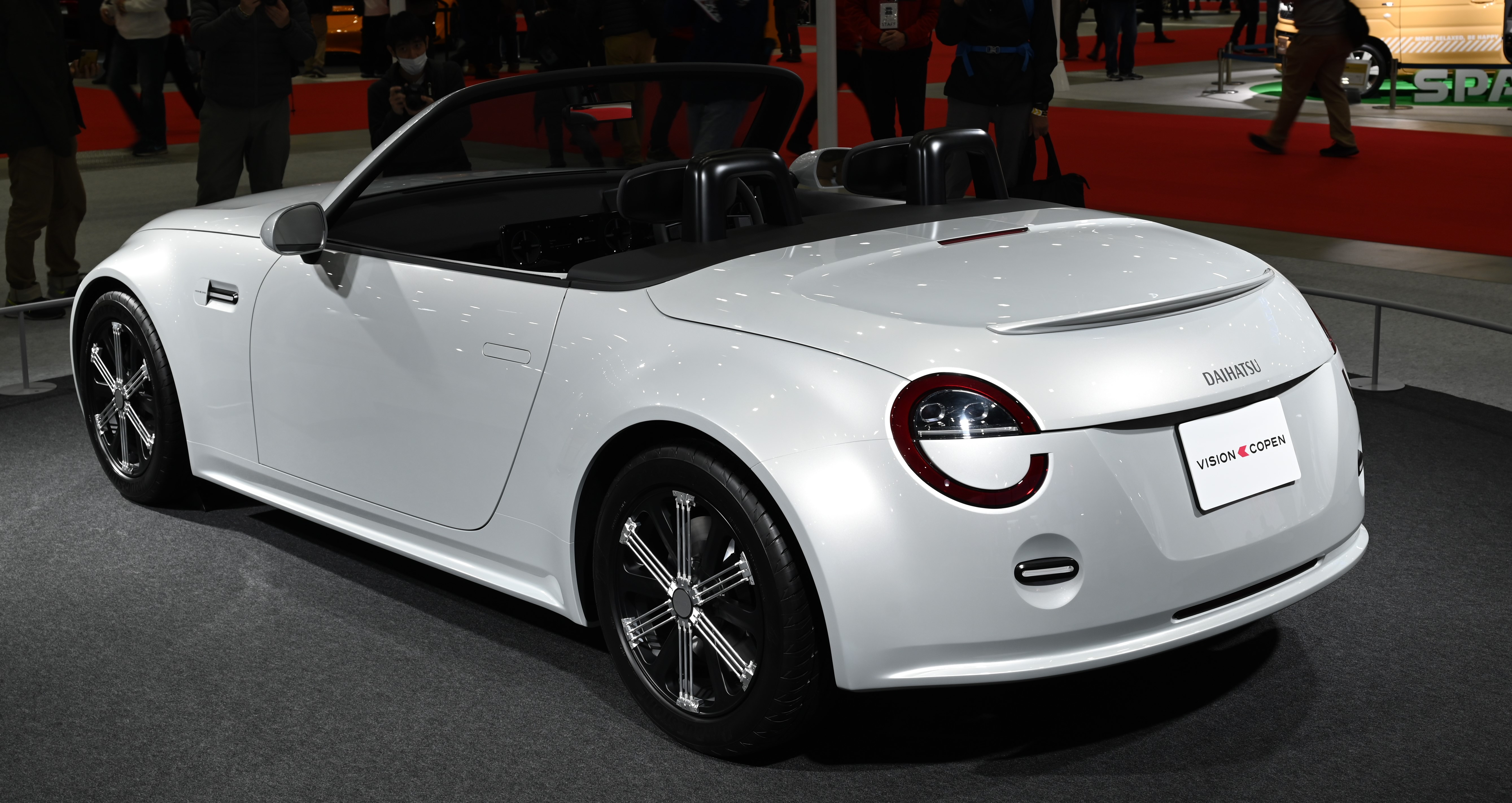
Rear view

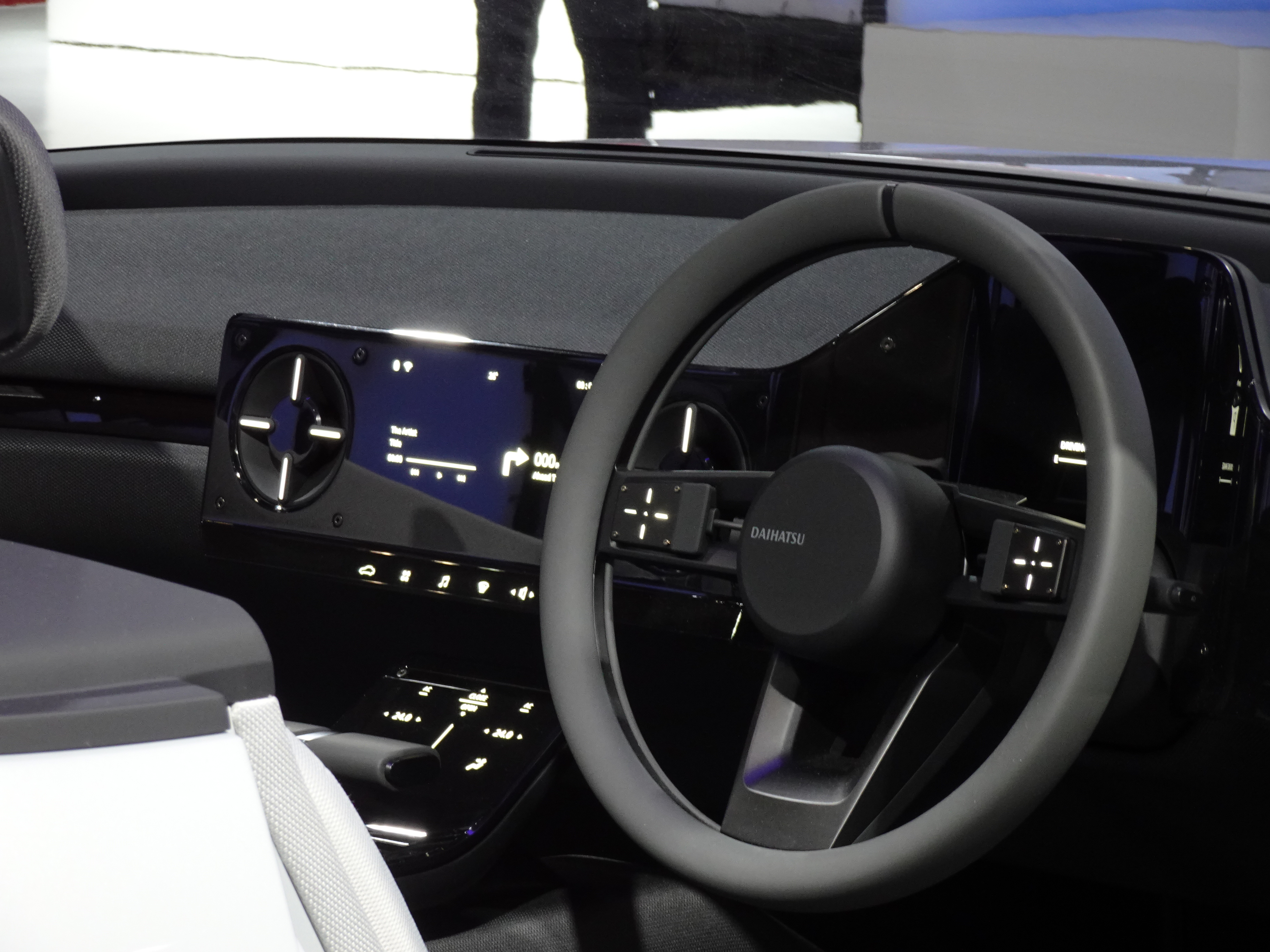
Interior

== K-Open (2025) ==
The K-Open was first presented in October 2025 at the 2025 Japan Mobility Show. It is a further development of 2023 Vision Copen. The K-Open shorter than the Vision Copen at 3,395 mm (133.7 in) long and 1,475 mm (58.1 in) wide. The new wheelbase of 2,265 mm (89.2 in) is 150 mm shorter than the previous, the Vision Concept. The biggest difference is that the grille in the Vision Concept has been deleted for the K-Open, which has a lower grille below the number plate instead. Flanking it are vertical LED light bars. The same look is mirrored at the rear, which is typically Copen.

Like the Copen concept car that was exhibited in 2013, The name "K-open" was a combination of kei class car, and "Open" for convertible roadster.

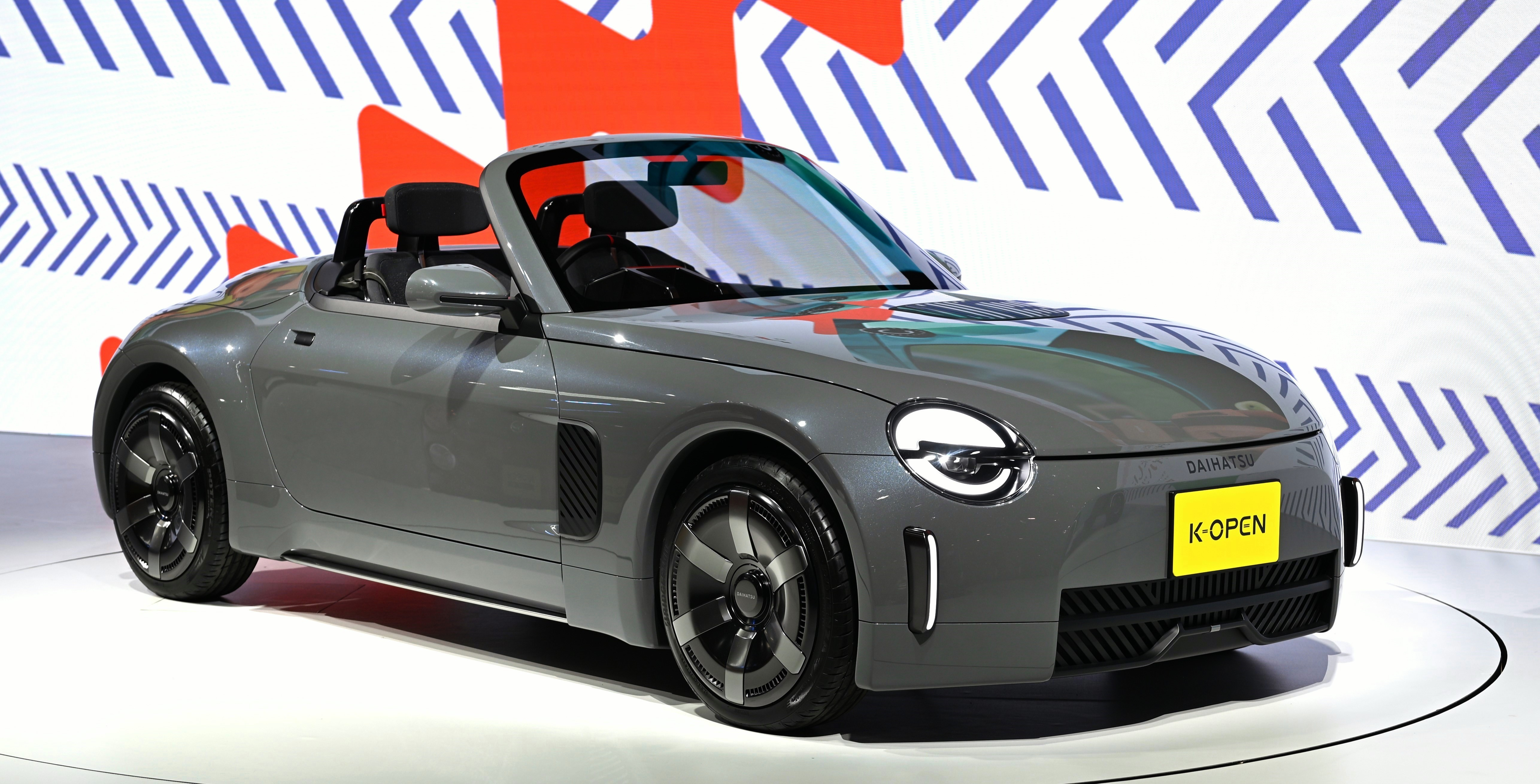
Daihatsu K-Open

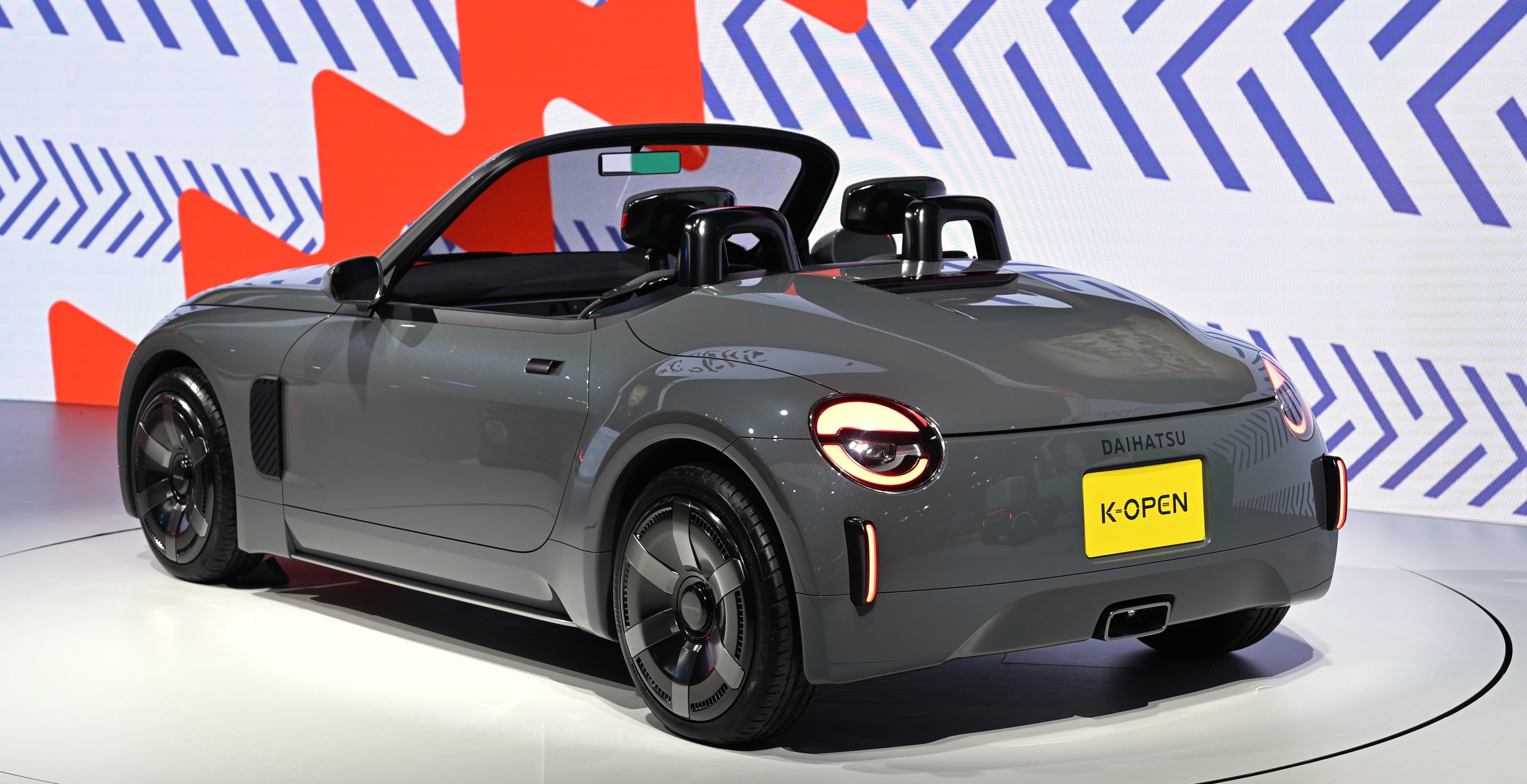
Rear view

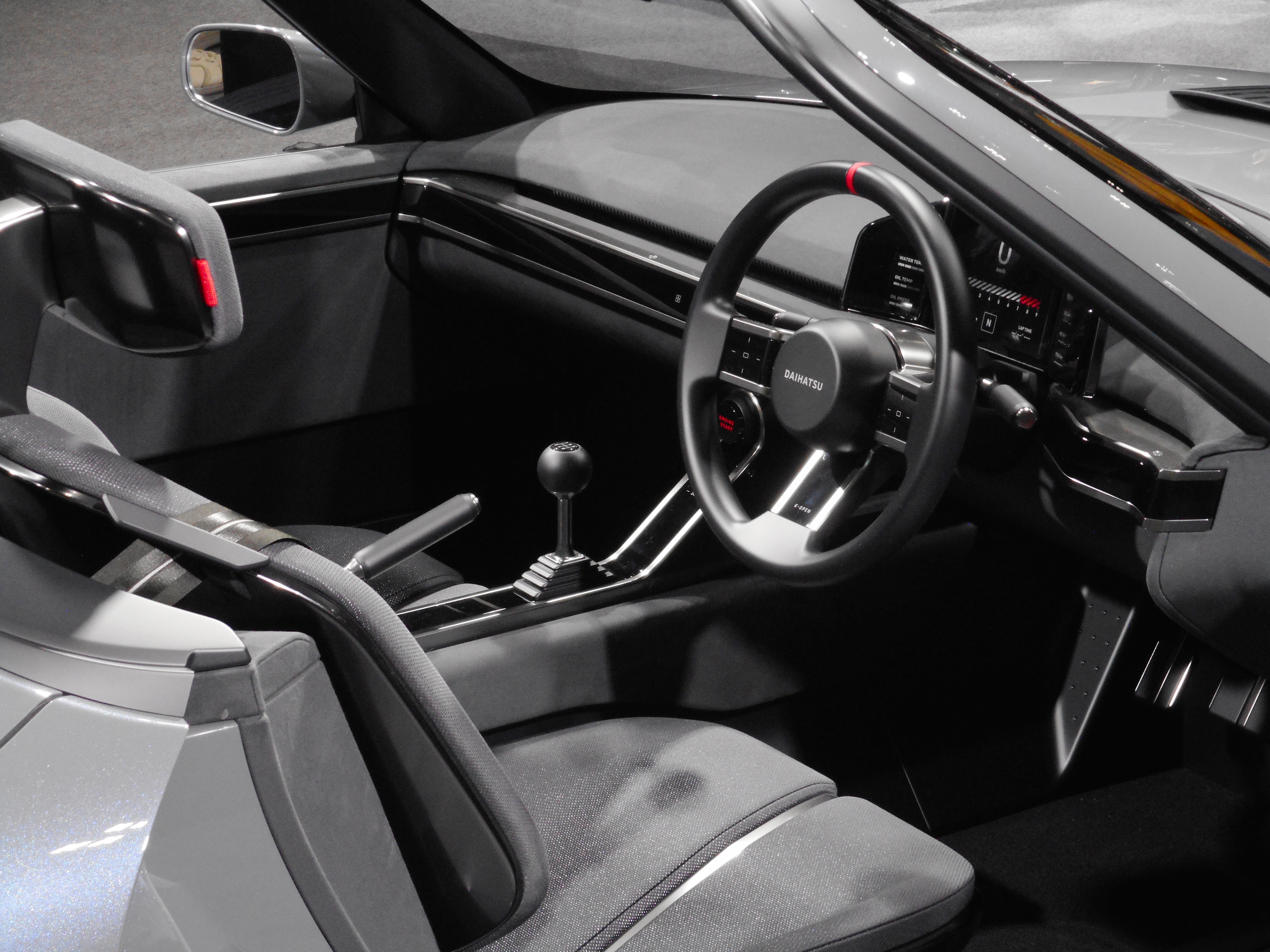
Interior

=== K-Open Running prototype ===
The K-OPEN Running prototype was unveiled at the 2025 Japan Mobility Show Nagoya along with K-OPEN concept. The body dimensions is the same as the K-OPEN, but this one has a wheelbase of 2,230 mm (87.8 in), shorter than K-OPEN concept model. Unlike the K-Open, which is a pure concept model, the Running Prototype is a study vehicle based on the production model Copen.

In 2026 a is a further development of the K-OPEN Running prototype called the Running prototype 2 which was unveiled in 2026 Tokyo Auto Salon. The main difference is that the Running Prototype 2 is engine is placed in the front-mid position.

Daihatsu K-Open Running prototype

Rear view

== Sales ==
Prior to its release, Daihatsu sets monthly sales target for the Copen at 500 units. The Copen managed to exceed its target in the first five annual sale years. However, it underperformed in the later years, except in 2015.

Year	Japan
2002	6,248
2003	10,838
2004	7,138
2005	6,410
2006	6,190
2007	5,703
2008	5,997
2009	3,322
2010	2,490
2011	2,006
2012	1,979
2013	5
2014	5,691
2015	7,274
2016	5,152
2017	2,853
2018	3,170
2019	3,822
2020	2,829
2021	3,454
2022	4,793
2023	4,655
2024	2,776
