= Copenhagen School =

The Copenhagen School is a term given to "schools" of theory originating in Copenhagen, Denmark. In at least four different scientific disciplines a theoretical approach originating in Copenhagen has been so influential that they have been dubbed "the Copenhagen School"

- Copenhagen School (quantum physics) — centered on the theories developed by Niels Bohr
- Copenhagen School (theology) — centered on a theoretical framework developed by Thomas L. Thompson, Niels Peter Lemche and others. Also called the School of Minimalist Theology. See Biblical minimalism
- Copenhagen School (international relations), security studies — centered on ideas by Barry Buzan, Ole Wæver and Jaap de Wilde.
- Copenhagen School (linguistics) — centered on the linguistic theories developed by Louis Hjelmslev, and later formed into the "Copenhagen school of functional linguistics".
- Copenhagen School (painting)
