= Car =

Motorised passenger road vehicle

- The Toyota Corolla is regarded as the best-selling car nameplate of all time.
- Classification: Vehicle
- Application: Transportation
- Fuel source: Battery, Biodiesel, Diesel, Fuel cell, Hybrids, Hydrogen, Natural gas, Petrol (most common), Solar cell
- Powered: Yes
- Self-propelled: Yes
- Wheels: 3–6, most often 4
- Axles: 2, less commonly 3
- Inventor: Carl Benz
- Invented: 1886 (140 years ago)

A car, or an automobile, is a motor vehicle with wheels. Most definitions of cars state that they run primarily on roads, seat 1–8 people, have four wheels, and mainly transport people rather than cargo. There are over 1.6 billion cars in use worldwide as of 2025.

In 1769, the French inventor Nicolas-Joseph Cugnot built the first steam-powered road vehicle, a large three-wheeled dray to carry artillery pieces at walking pace. In 1808, the Swiss inventor François Isaac de Rivaz designed and constructed the first internal-combustion-powered automobile; range was limited to tens of metres by the gaseous fuel held in a large balloon.

Until the late nineteenth century the only source of mechanical power for long-distance travel by land was coal in a steam engine. A notable early example of a personal steam carriage was that made in 1840 by Frank Hills of Deptford, near London. This cruised at 26 km/h (16 mph) and was used for day trips, including one of 206 km (128 miles). In France between 1873 and 1885 Amédée Bollée built a series of steam-powered road passenger vehicles. These pioneered fully-independent suspension and the front-mounted engine with rear-wheel drive.

The modern car—a practical, marketable automobile for everyday use—was invented in 1886, when the German inventor Carl Benz patented his Benz Patent-Motorwagen. (Note: Before Karl Benz patented his Motorwagen in January 1886, several inventors were working on automobiles powered by steam engines. However, steam cars suffered from several practical limitations, including very long startup times, complex operation, often needing a crew (including a stoker), considerable weight, and the risk of boiler explosions. Various authors have therefore characterized steam cars as "distinctly uncommercial", "unsafe" and "difficult to manage", and have explained why they never became a practical choice for everyday transportation. According to automotive historian G. N. Georgano, the stationary Otto engine helped make the invention of the Benz Motorwagen possible, which he labelled as "the first motorcar" due to its commercial production. The company Mercedes-Benz also acknowledge there were forerunners to the Motorwagen, but also state that Benz was the first to develop "a 'horseless carriage' into a product for everyday use, which he then brought to market and as a result made his idea useful for the entire world".) By the end of the nineteenth century, Benz was selling 500 a year of later versions of this. Commercial cars became widely available during the 20th century. The 1901 Oldsmobile Curved Dash and the 1908 Ford Model T, both American cars, are widely considered the first mass-produced and mass-affordable cars, respectively. Cars were rapidly adopted in the US, where they replaced horse-drawn carriages. In Europe and other parts of the world, demand for automobiles did not increase until after World War II. In the 21st century, car usage is still increasing rapidly, especially in China, India, and other newly industrialised countries.

Cars have controls for driving, parking, passenger comfort, and a variety of lamps. Over the decades, additional features and controls have been added to vehicles, making them progressively more complex. These include seat belts, airbags, rear-reversing cameras, air conditioning, navigation systems, and in-car entertainment. Most cars in use in the early 2020s are propelled by an internal combustion engine, fueled by the combustion of fossil fuels. Electric cars, which competed with those powered by the internal-combustion engine and steam at the start of the twentieth century, became commercially available again in the 2000s and widespread in the 2020s.

There are costs and benefits to car use. The costs to the individual include acquiring the vehicle, repairs and maintenance, fuel, driving time, parking fees, taxes, and insurance. Personal benefits include on-demand transportation, mobility, independence, and convenience. Societal benefits include economic benefits, such as job and wealth creation from the automotive industry, and societal wellbeing from leisure and travel opportunities. Traffic collisions are the largest cause of injury-related deaths worldwide. As of 2024, cars produce 10% of global carbon dioxide emissions, contributing to climate change. Other environmental impacts include the resources used to produce and dispose of them and procure their fuel, air pollution from exhaust and particles released by brakes and contact between tyres and the road, and noise and light pollution. Widespread car use results in road congestion and promotes urban sprawl, leading to higher infrastructure costs, habitat destruction, limited mobility for those who cannot drive (including children, disabled people, and the elderly), social isolation, and sedentary lifestyles that worsen health outcomes.

== Etymology ==
The English word car is believed to originate from Latin carrus/carrum "wheeled vehicle" or (via Old North French) Middle English carre "two-wheeled cart", both of which in turn derive from Gaulish karros "chariot". It originally referred to any wheeled horse-drawn vehicle, such as a cart, carriage, or wagon. The word also occurs in Celtic languages.

"Motor car", attested from 1895, is the usual formal term in British English. "Autocar", a variant likewise attested from 1895 and literally meaning "self-propelled car", is now considered archaic. "Horseless carriage" is attested from 1895.

"Automobile", a classical compound derived from Ancient Greek autós (αὐτός) "self" and Latin mobilis "movable", entered English from French and was first adopted by the Automobile Club of Great Britain in 1897. It fell out of favour in Britain and is now used chiefly in North America, where the abbreviated form "auto" commonly appears as an adjective in compound formations like "auto industry" and "auto mechanic".

== History ==
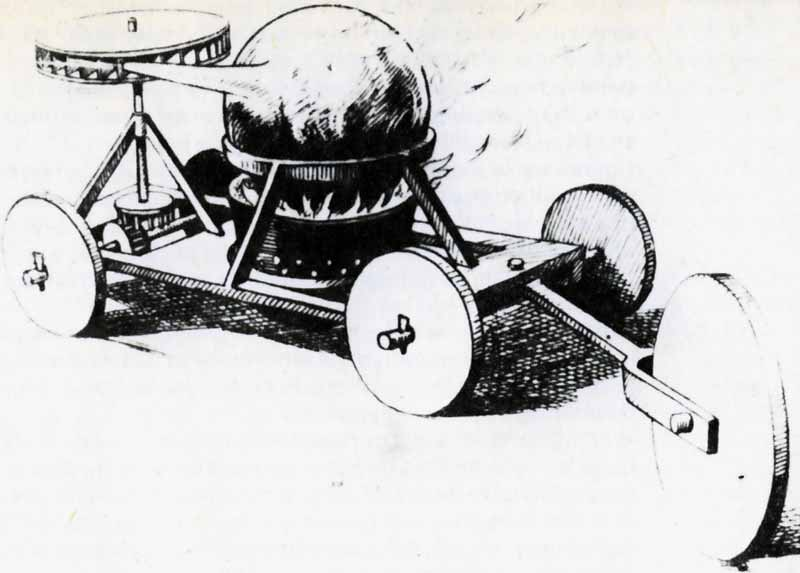
Steam machine of Verbiest, in 1678 (Ferdinand Verbiest)

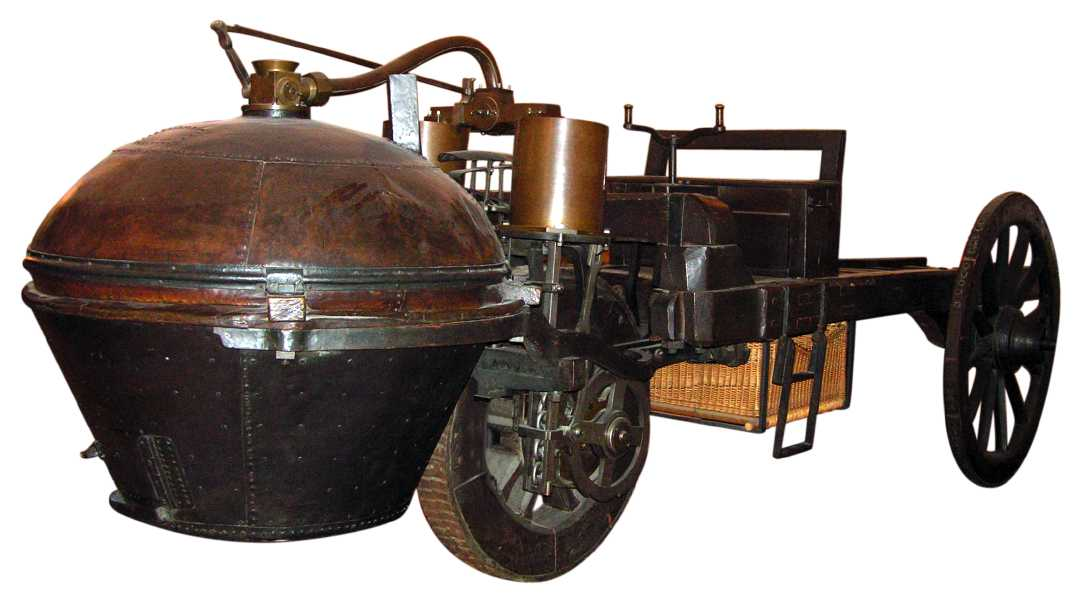
Cugnot's 1771 fardier à vapeur, as preserved at the Musée des Arts et Métiers, Paris

Walter Hancock's steam car of 1838

Frank Hills' steam carriage, 1840

Amédée Bollée jr driving L'Obéissante at Le Mans, 1923

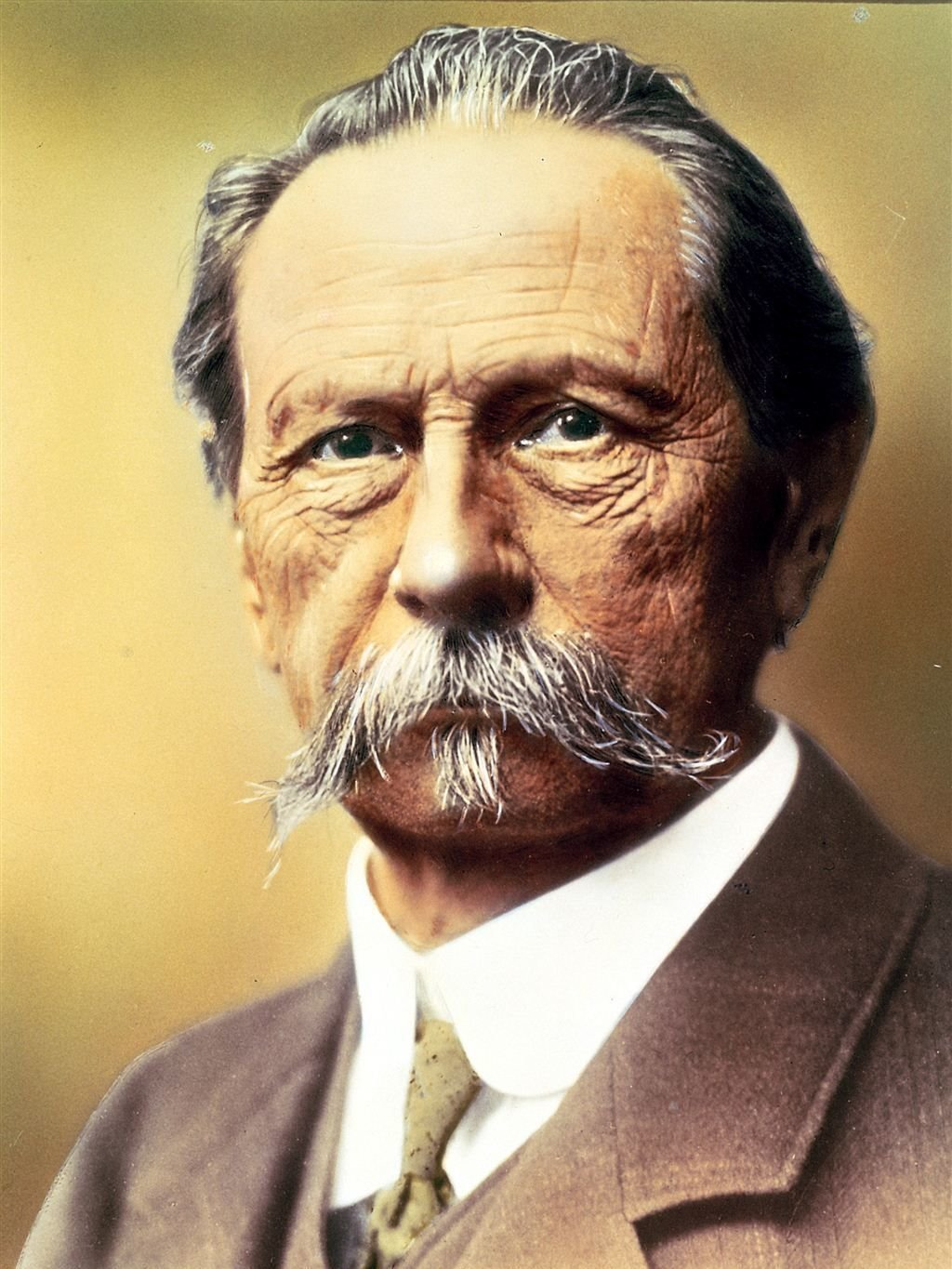
Carl Benz, the inventor of the modern car

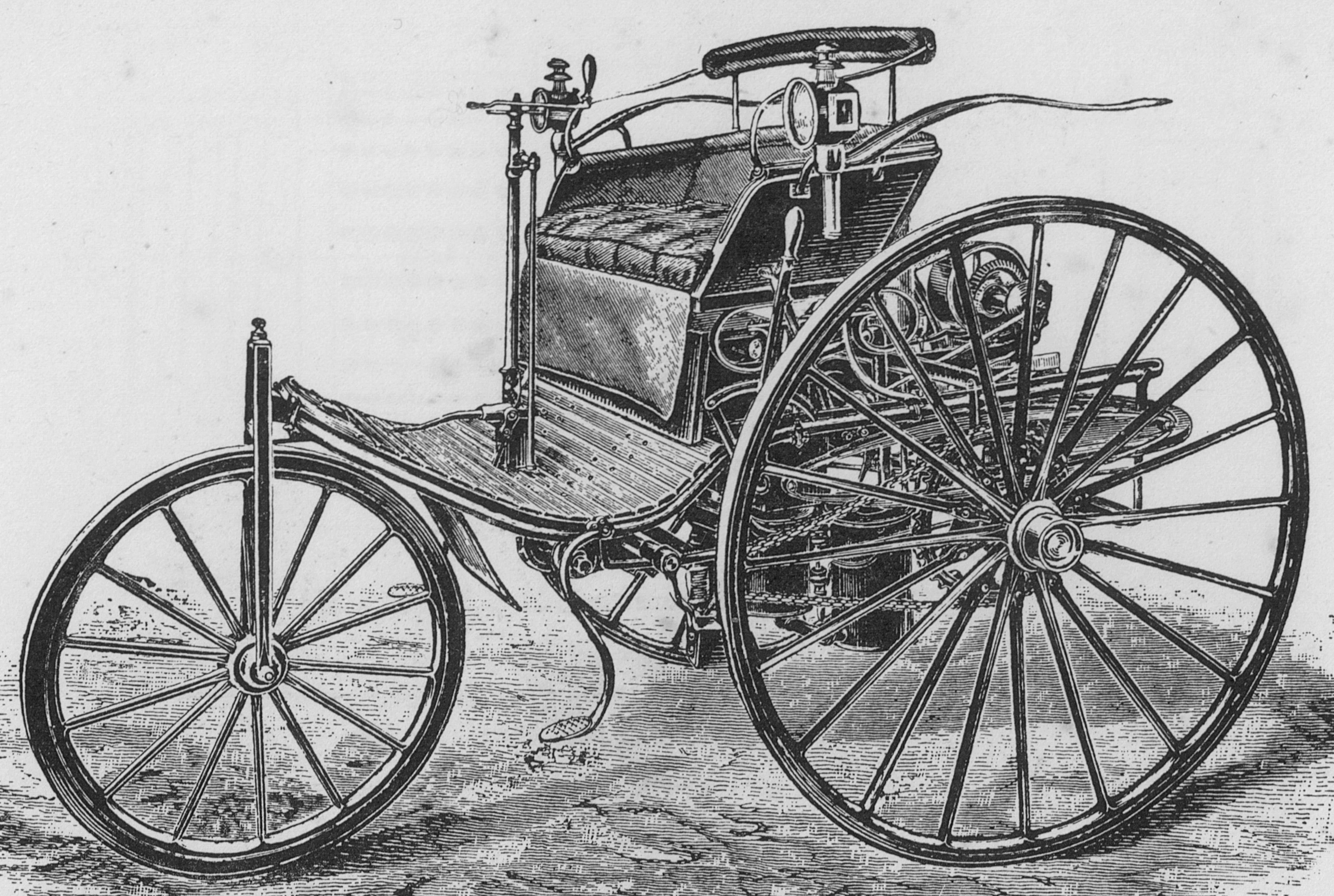
The first practical car, Carl Benz's Patent-Motorwagen Nr. 2 of 1886 (image from 1888)

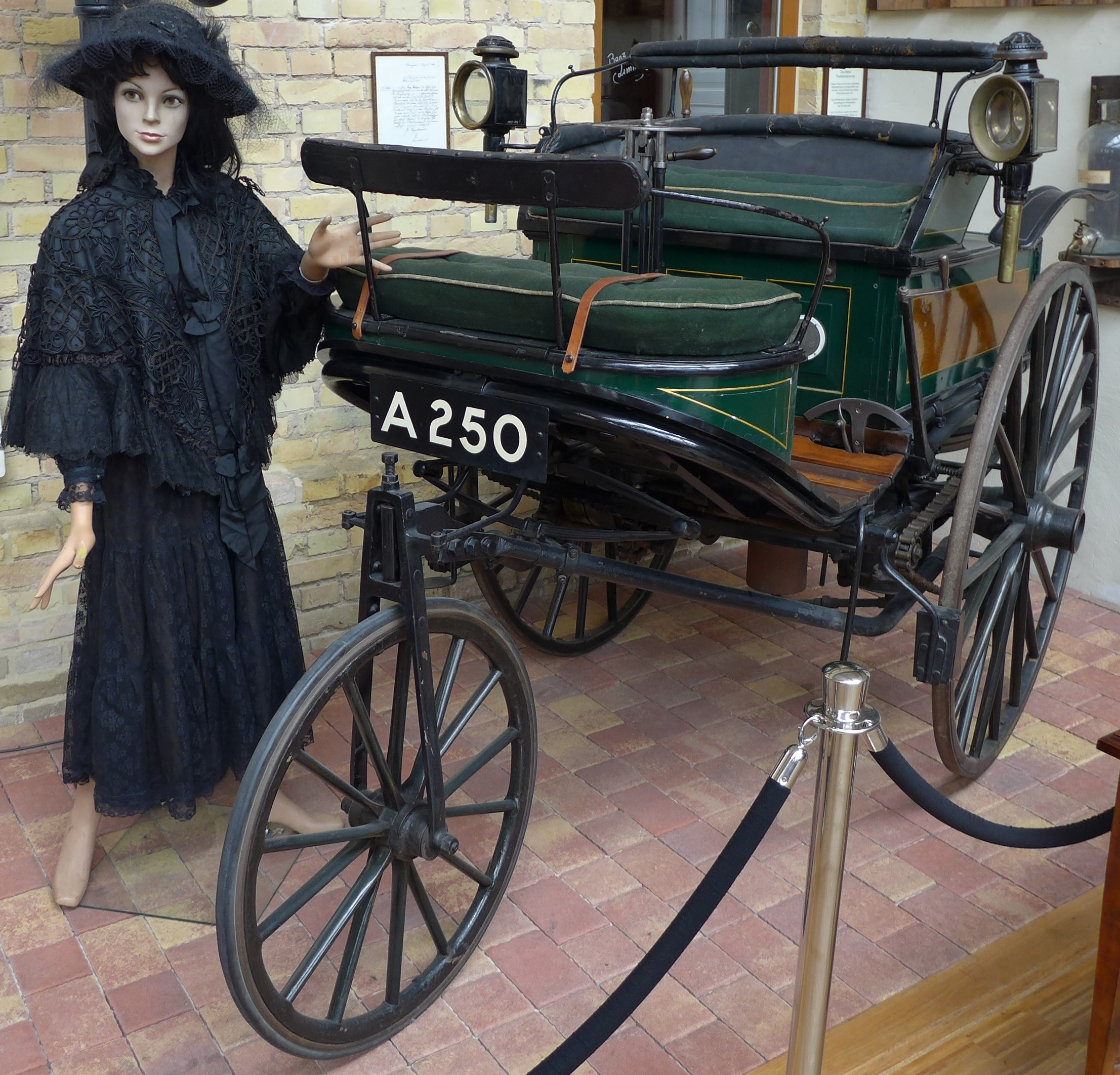
The first production car: 1888 Benz Patent-Motorwagen Model 2 on loan from Science Museum, London to Automuseum Dr Carl Benz, Ladenburg, 2014

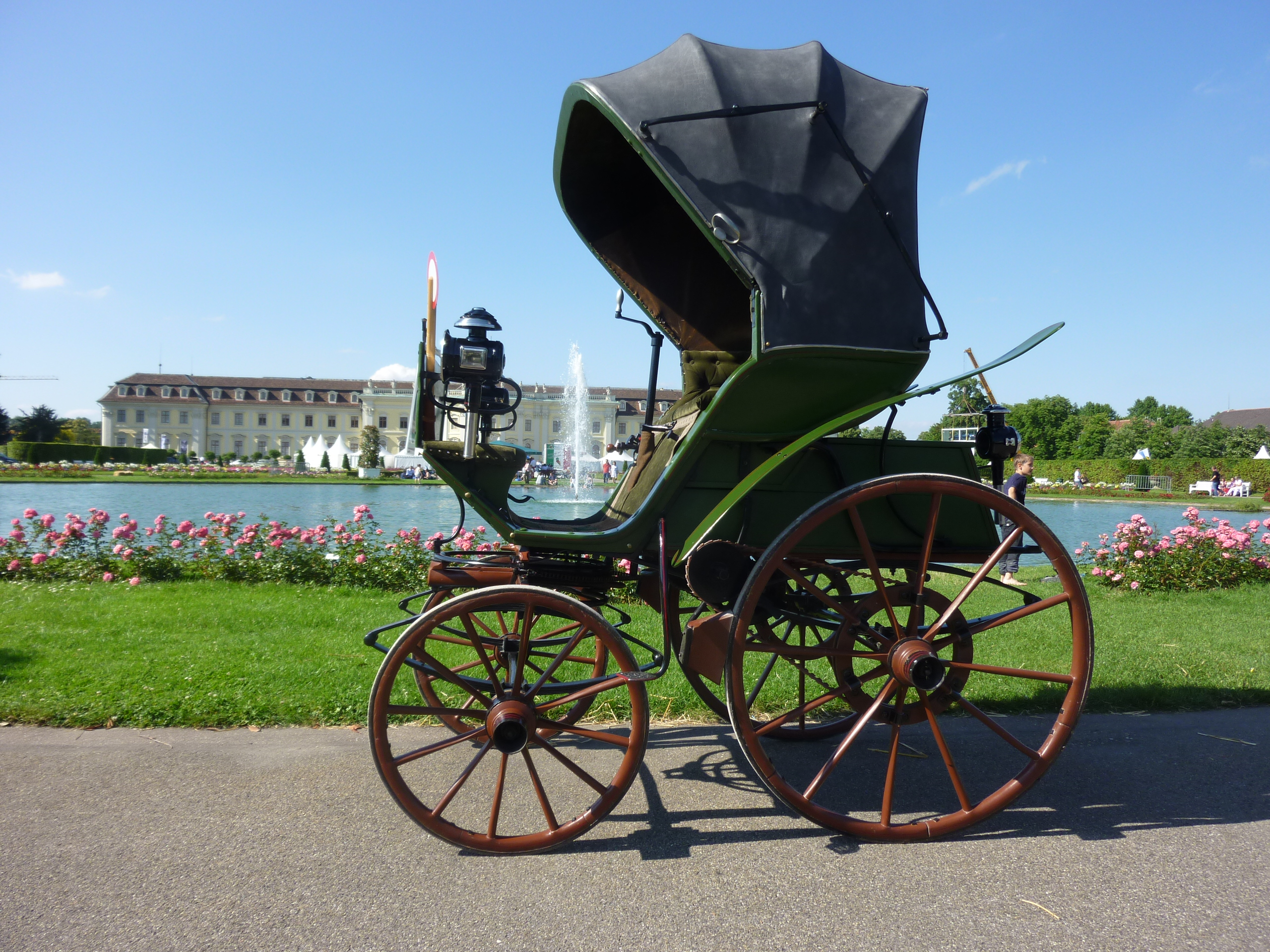
The Flocken Elektrowagen was the first four-wheeled electric car

In 1649, Hans Hautsch of Nuremberg built a clockwork-driven carriage. The first steam-powered vehicle was designed by Ferdinand Verbiest, a Flemish member of a Jesuit mission in China around 1672. It was a 65-centimetre-long (26 in) scale-model toy for the Kangxi Emperor that was unable to carry a driver or a passenger. It is not known with certainty if Verbiest's model was successfully built or run.

Nicolas-Joseph Cugnot is widely credited with building the first full-scale, self-propelled mechanical vehicle in about 1769; he created a steam-powered tricycle. He also constructed two steam tractors for the French Army, one of which is preserved in the French National Conservatory of Arts and Crafts. His inventions were limited by problems with water supply and maintaining steam pressure. In 1801, Richard Trevithick built and demonstrated his Puffing Devil road locomotive, believed by many to be the first demonstration of a steam-powered road vehicle. It was unable to maintain sufficient steam pressure for long periods and was of little practical use.

The development of external combustion (also known as steam) engines is detailed in the history of the car. It is often treated separately from the development of cars in their modern understanding, but these built on the technology of steam road vehicles. In the first half of the 19th century, a variety of steam-powered road vehicles were used, including steam cars, steam buses, phaetons, and steam rollers.

In 1807, Nicéphore Niépce and his brother Claude created what was probably the world's first internal combustion engine (which they called a Pyréolophore), which they installed in a boat on the river Saone in France. Coincidentally, in 1807, the Swiss inventor François Isaac de Rivaz designed his own "de Rivaz internal combustion engine", and used it to develop the world's first vehicle to be powered by such an engine. The Niépces' Pyréolophore was fuelled by a mixture of Lycopodium powder (dried spores of the Lycopodium plant), finely crushed coal dust, and resin that were mixed with oil, whereas de Rivaz used a mixture of hydrogen and oxygen held in a balloon. Neither design was successful, as was the case with others, such as Samuel Brown, Samuel Morey, and Etienne Lenoir, who each built vehicles (usually adapted carriages or carts) powered by internal combustion engines.

In the United Kingdom, by 1840 the first phase of applying steam power to transport had resulted in some remarkable vehicles, including the Walter Hancock steam car of 1838 and the Frank Hills steam carriage of 1840. However, it was clear that rail was a better prospect than road and by 1860 steam road vehicles for passenger use had almost disappeared. By then, steam had found a new use in heavy haulage (traction engines) and agriculture (ploughing engines). The Locomotive Acts from 1861 onwards were promoted by manufacturers of such vehicles to permit their use on the roads, but the restrictions accepted as a quid pro quo inhibited the development in the UK of light powered road vehicles.

In France in 1873 Amédée Bollée built L'Obéissante, a 5-tonne road steamer with wire wheels and fully-independent suspension; it could carry 12 passengers. He followed this with La Mancelle, a 2¾-tonne steam-powered Victoria with front-mounted engine, a crankshaft to a differential and chain drive to each rear wheel. About 50 were built between 1878 and 1881, including 22 in Berlin by Wöhlert.

In November 1881, French inventor Gustave Trouvé demonstrated a three-wheeled car powered by electricity at the International Exposition of Electricity. Several other German engineers, including Gottlieb Daimler, Wilhelm Maybach, Siegfried Marcus, and Carl Benz were also working on cars and engines at about the same time.

In 1879, Benz was granted a patent for a stationary engine. He had long dreamed of applying the internal combustion engine to produce a horseless carriage and began work on it in 1884. In 1885 he produced his first prototype car, the Benz Patent-Motorwagen Nr. 1. On 29 January 1886 he applied for a patent for it, which was granted on 2 November of that year. Benz further developed the Patent-Motorwagen, and had sufficient confidence in this to drive into Mannheim and have his vehicle written up in the Neue Badische Landeszeitung of 4 June 1886.

Benz' first production car, the Patent-Motorwagen Model 2, was produced in single-digit numbers in 1887–88. Frenchman Émile Roger, already producing Benz engines under license, had added the Benz car to his product line in 1888. Perhaps 60 of the Model 3 were produced between 1889 and 1893, the majority assembled in Paris from kits by Émile Roger. Many historians consider Benz' advances so significant that they largely credit him as the inventor of the car and regard his 1886 patent as the birth of the modern car.

In August 1888, Bertha Benz, the wife and business partner of Carl Benz, undertook the first road trip by an internal combustion engine car, to prove the road-worthiness of her husband's invention. In 1896, Carl Benz designed and patented the first internal-combustion flat engine, called boxermotor. During the last years of the 19th century, Benz was the largest car company in the world with 572 units produced in 1899 and, because of its size, Benz & Cie. became a joint-stock company. The first motor car in central Europe and one of the first factory-made cars in the world was produced by the Czech company Nesselsdorfer Wagenbau (later renamed to Tatra) in 1897, the Präsident automobil.

Daimler and Maybach founded Daimler Motoren Gesellschaft (DMG) in Cannstatt in 1890, and sold their first car in 1892 under the brand name Daimler. It was a horse-drawn stagecoach built by another manufacturer, which they retrofitted with an engine of their design. By 1895, about 30 vehicles had been built by Daimler and Maybach, either at the Daimler works or at the Hotel Hermann, where they set up shop after disputes with their backers. Benz, Maybach, and the Daimler team seem to have been unaware of each other's early work. They never worked together; by the time of the merger of the two companies, Daimler and Maybach were no longer part of DMG.

Daimler died in 1900, and later that year, Maybach designed an engine named Daimler-Mercedes that was installed in a specially ordered model built to specifications set by Emil Jellinek. This was a limited production run of vehicles for Jellinek to race and market in his country. Two years later, in 1902, a new model of the DMG car was produced and named Mercedes after the Maybach engine, which generated 35 hp. Maybach left DMG shortly thereafter and opened his own business. Rights to the Daimler brand name were sold to other manufacturers.

In 1890, Émile Levassor (who had bought a Benz Patent-Motorwagen Model 2 in 1888) and Armand Peugeot of France began producing vehicles with Daimler engines, and so laid the foundation of the automotive industry in France. In 1891, Auguste Doriot and his Peugeot colleague Louis Rigoulot completed the longest trip by a petrol-driven vehicle when their self-designed and built Daimler-powered Peugeot Type 3 completed 2,100 kilometres (1,300 mi) from Valentigney to Paris and Brest and back again. They were attached to the first Paris–Brest–Paris bicycle race, but finished six days after the winning cyclist, Charles Terront.

The first design for an American car with a petrol internal combustion engine was made in 1877 by George Selden of Rochester, New York. Selden applied for a patent for a car in 1879, but the patent application expired because the vehicle was never built. After a delay of 16 years and a series of attachments to his application, on 5 November 1895, Selden was granted a US patent (U.S. patent 549,160) for a road locomotive powered by a two-stroke engine, which, many argued, hindered, more than encouraged, development of cars in the United States. His patent was challenged by Henry Ford and others, and, in 1911, the court ruled that the patent held only for cars using two-stroke "Brayton type" engines, which by then had mostly fallen out of use in favor of four-stroke Otto cycle engines.

In 1893, the first running, petrol-driven American car was built and road-tested by the Duryea brothers of Springfield, Massachusetts. The first public run of the Duryea Motor Wagon took place on 21 September 1893, on Taylor Street in Metro Center Springfield. Studebaker, subsidiary of a long-established wagon and coach manufacturer, started to build cars in 1897 and commenced sales of electric vehicles in 1902 and petrol vehicles in 1904.

In Britain, there had been several attempts to build steam cars with varying degrees of success, with Thomas Rickett even attempting a production run in 1860. Santler from Malvern is recognised by the Veteran Car Club of Great Britain as having made the first petrol-driven car in the country in 1894, followed by Frederick William Lanchester in 1895, but these were both one-offs. The first production vehicles in Great Britain came from the Daimler Company, a company founded by Harry J. Lawson in 1896, after purchasing the right to use the name of the engines. Lawson's company made its first car in 1897, and they bore the name Daimler.

In 1892, German engineer Rudolf Diesel was granted a patent for a "New Rational Combustion Engine". In 1897, he built the first diesel engine. Steam-, electric-, and petrol-driven vehicles competed for a few decades, with petrol internal combustion engines achieving dominance in the 1910s. Although various pistonless rotary engine designs have attempted to compete with the conventional piston and crankshaft design, only Mazda's version of the Wankel engine has had more than very limited success. All in all, it is estimated that over 100,000 patents have contributed to the modern automobile and motorcycle.

=== Mass production ===
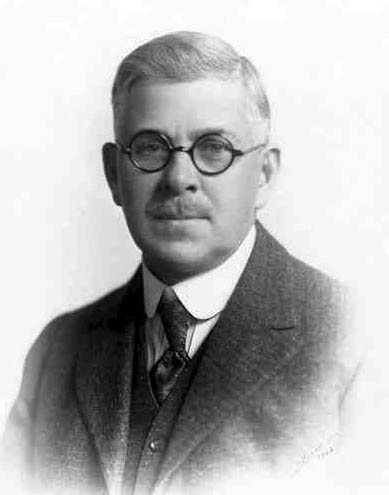
Ransom E. Olds founded Olds Motor Vehicle Company (Oldsmobile) in 1897.

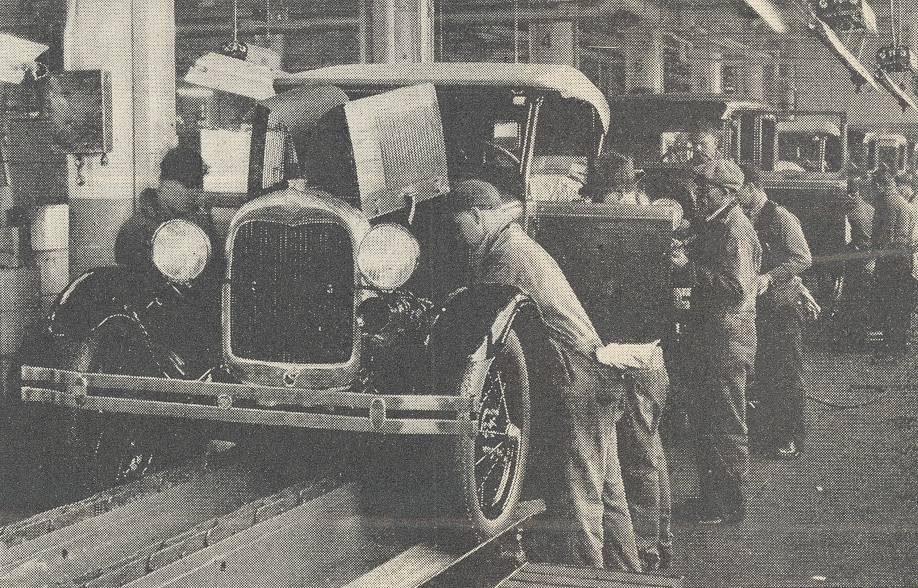
Ford Motor Company automobile assembly line in the 1920s

Large-scale, production-line manufacturing of affordable cars was started by Ransom Olds in 1901 at his Oldsmobile factory in Lansing, Michigan, and based upon stationary assembly line techniques pioneered by Marc Isambard Brunel at the Portsmouth Block Mills, England, in 1802. The assembly line style of mass production and interchangeable parts had been pioneered in the US by Thomas Blanchard in 1821, at the Springfield Armory in Springfield, Massachusetts. This concept was greatly expanded by Henry Ford, beginning in 1913 with the world's first moving assembly line for cars at the Highland Park Ford Plant.

As a result, Ford's cars came off the line in 15-minute intervals, much faster than previous methods, increasing productivity eightfold while using less labour (from 12.5 manhours to 1 hour 33 minutes). It was so successful, paint became a bottleneck. Only Japan black would dry fast enough, forcing the company to drop the variety of colours available before 1913, until fast-drying Duco lacquer was developed in 1926. This is the source of Ford's apocryphal remark, "any color as long as it's black". In 1914, an assembly line worker could buy a Model T with four months' pay.

Ford's complex safety procedures—especially assigning each worker to a specific location rather than allowing them to roam—dramatically reduced injury rates. The combination of high wages and high efficiency is called "Fordism" and was copied by most major industries. The efficiency gains from the assembly line also coincided with the US's economic rise. The assembly line forced workers to move at a certain pace with very repetitive motions, which led to more output per worker, while other countries used less productive methods.

In the automotive industry, its success was dominant and quickly spread worldwide, with the founding of Ford France and Ford Britain in 1911, Ford Denmark in 1923, and Ford Germany in 1925; in 1921, Citroën was the first native European manufacturer to adopt the production method. Soon, companies had to have assembly lines or risk going bankrupt; by 1930, 250 companies that did not have assembly lines disappeared.

The development of automotive technology was rapid, due in part to the hundreds of small manufacturers competing to gain the world's attention. Key developments included electric ignition and the electric self-starter (both by Charles Kettering, for the Cadillac Motor Company in 1910–1911), independent suspension, and four-wheel brakes.

Since the 1920s, nearly all cars have been mass-produced to meet market needs, so marketing plans have often heavily influenced car design. It was Alfred P. Sloan who established the idea of different makes of cars produced by one company, called the General Motors Companion Make Program, so that buyers could "move up" as their fortunes improved.

Reflecting the rapid pace of change, makers shared parts with one another, resulting in lower costs across all price ranges. For example, in the 1930s, LaSalles, sold by Cadillac, used cheaper mechanical parts made by Oldsmobile; in the 1950s, Chevrolet shared bonnet, doors, roof, and windows with Pontiac; by the 1990s, corporate powertrains and shared platforms (with interchangeable brakes, suspension, and other parts) were common. Even so, only major makers could afford high costs, and even companies with decades of production, such as Apperson, Cole, Dorris, Haynes, or Premier, could not manage: of some two hundred American car makers in existence in 1920, only 43 survived in 1930, and with the Great Depression, by 1940, only 17 of those were left.

In Europe, much the same would happen. Morris set up its production line at Cowley in 1924, and soon outsold Ford, while beginning in 1923 to follow Ford's practice of vertical integration, buying Hotchkiss' British subsidiary (engines), Wrigley (gearboxes), and Osberton (radiators), for instance, as well as competitors, such as Wolseley: in 1925, Morris had 41 per cent of total British car production. Most British small-car assemblers, from Abbey to Xtra, had gone under. Citroën did the same in France, coming to cars in 1919; between them and other cheap cars in reply such as Renault's 10CV and Peugeot's 5CV, they produced 550,000 cars in 1925, and Mors, Hurtu, and others could not compete. Germany's first mass-manufactured car, the Opel 4PS Laubfrosch (Tree Frog), came off the line at Rüsselsheim in 1924, soon making Opel the top car builder in Germany, with 37.5 per cent of the market.

In Japan, car production was very limited before World War II. Only a handful of companies produced vehicles in limited numbers, and these were small, three-wheeled for commercial use, like Daihatsu, or the result of partnerships with European companies, like Isuzu building the Wolseley A-9 in 1922. Mitsubishi was also partnered with Fiat and built the Mitsubishi Model A based on a Fiat vehicle. Toyota, Nissan, Suzuki, Mazda, and Honda began as companies producing non-automotive products before the war, then switched to car production in the 1950s. Kiichiro Toyoda's decision to take Toyoda Loom Works into automobile manufacturing would eventually lead to the formation of Toyota Motor Corporation, the world's largest automobile manufacturer. Subaru, meanwhile, was formed from a conglomerate of six companies that banded together as Fuji Heavy Industries, as a result of having been broken up under keiretsu legislation.

== Components and design ==
=== Propulsion and fuels ===
==== Fossil fuels ====
Most cars in use in the mid 2020s run on petrol burnt in an internal combustion engine (ICE). Some cities ban older, more polluting petrol-driven cars, and some countries plan to ban sales in the future. However, some environmental groups say this phase-out of fossil fuel vehicles must be brought forward to limit climate change. Production of petrol-fuelled cars peaked in 2017.

Other hydrocarbon fossil fuels also burnt by deflagration (rather than detonation) in ICE cars include diesel, autogas, and CNG. Removal of fossil fuel subsidies, concerns about oil dependence, tightening environmental laws and restrictions on greenhouse gas emissions are propelling work on alternative power systems for cars. This includes hybrid vehicles, plug-in electric vehicles, and hydrogen vehicles. As of 2025 one in four cars sold is electric but, despite rapid growth, less than one in twenty cars on the world's roads were fully electric and plug-in hybrid cars by the end of 2024. Cars for racing or speed records have sometimes employed jet or rocket engines, but these are impractical for common use. Oil consumption has increased rapidly in the 20th and 21st centuries because there are more cars; the 1980s oil glut even fuelled the sales of low-economy vehicles in OECD countries.

==== Batteries ====
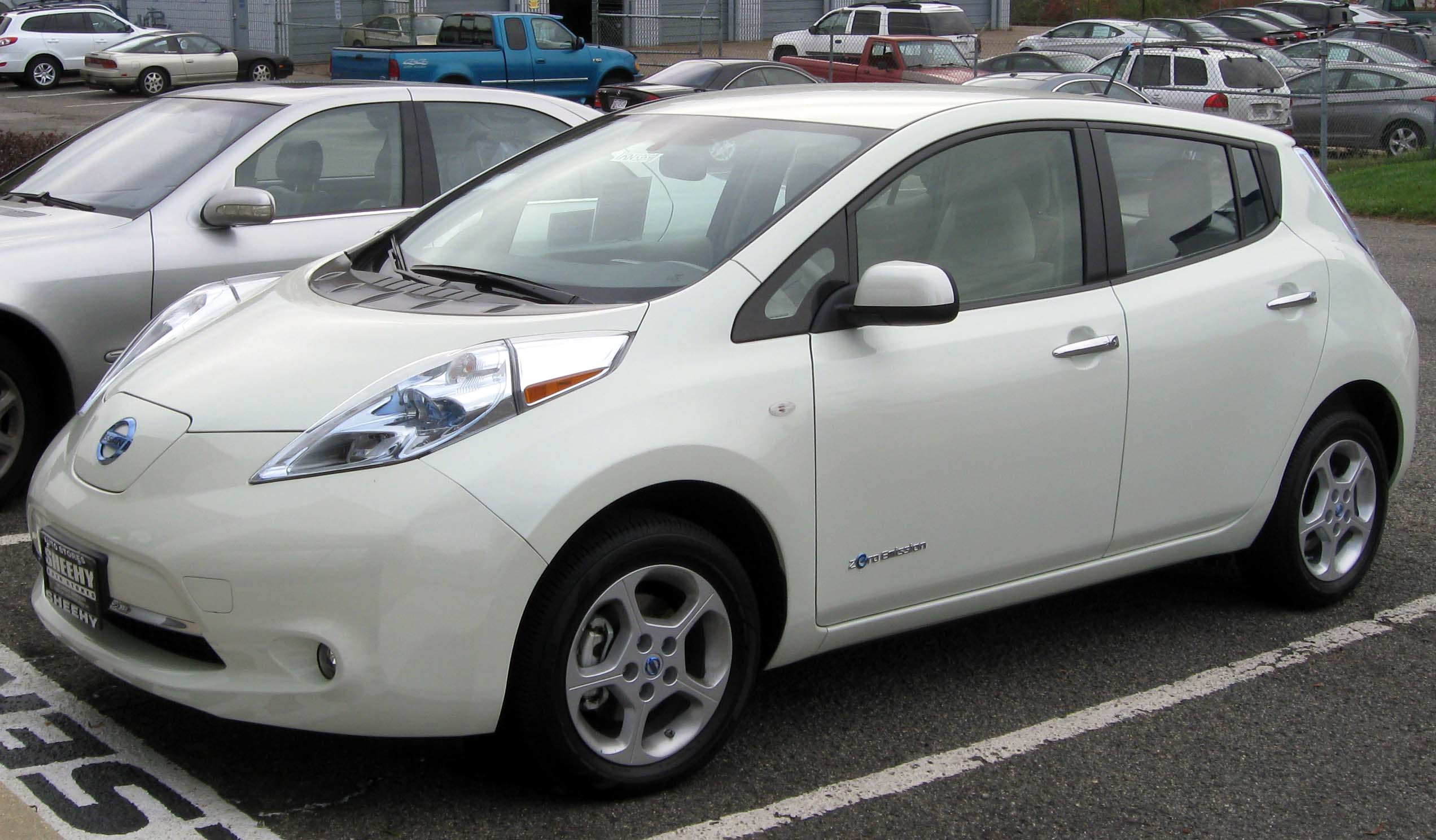
2011 Nissan Leaf electric car

The weight of the low battery stabilises the car. This is a dual-motor, four-wheel-drive layout, but many cars only have one motor.

In almost all hybrid (even mild hybrid) and pure electric cars, regenerative braking recovers and returns to a battery some energy which would otherwise be wasted by friction brakes getting hot. Although all cars must have friction brakes (front disc brakes and either disc or drum rear brakes) for emergency stops, regenerative braking improves efficiency, particularly in city driving.

=== User interface ===
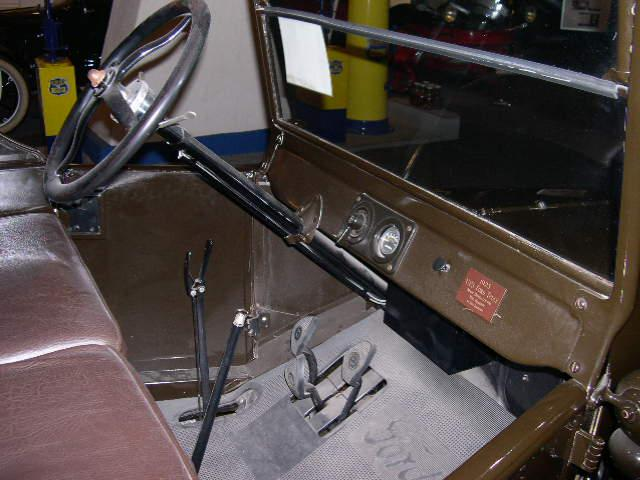
In the Ford Model T the left-side hand lever sets the rear wheel parking brakes and puts the transmission in neutral. The lever to the right controls the throttle. The lever on the left of the steering column is for ignition timing. The left foot pedal changes the two forward gears while the centre pedal controls reverse. The right pedal is the brake.

Cars are equipped with controls for driving, passenger comfort, and safety, normally operated by a combination of feet and hands, and occasionally by voice in 21st-century cars. These controls include a steering wheel, pedals for operating the brakes and controlling the car's speed (and, in a manual transmission car, a clutch pedal), a shift lever or stick for changing gears, and several buttons and dials for turning on lights, ventilation, and other functions. Modern cars' controls are now standardised, such as the location of the accelerator and brake, but this was not always the case. Controls are evolving in response to new technologies, for example, the electric car and the integration of mobile communications.

Some of the original controls are no longer required. For example, all cars once had controls for the choke valve, clutch, ignition timing, and a crank instead of an electric starter. However, new controls have also been added to vehicles, making them more complex. These include air conditioning, navigation systems, and in-car entertainment. Another trend is the replacement of physical knobs and switches with secondary controls, such as touchscreen controls, such as BMW's iDrive and Ford's MyFord Touch. Another change is that while early cars' pedals were physically linked to the brake mechanism and throttle, in the early 2020s, cars have increasingly replaced these physical linkages with electronic controls.

=== Electronics and interior ===
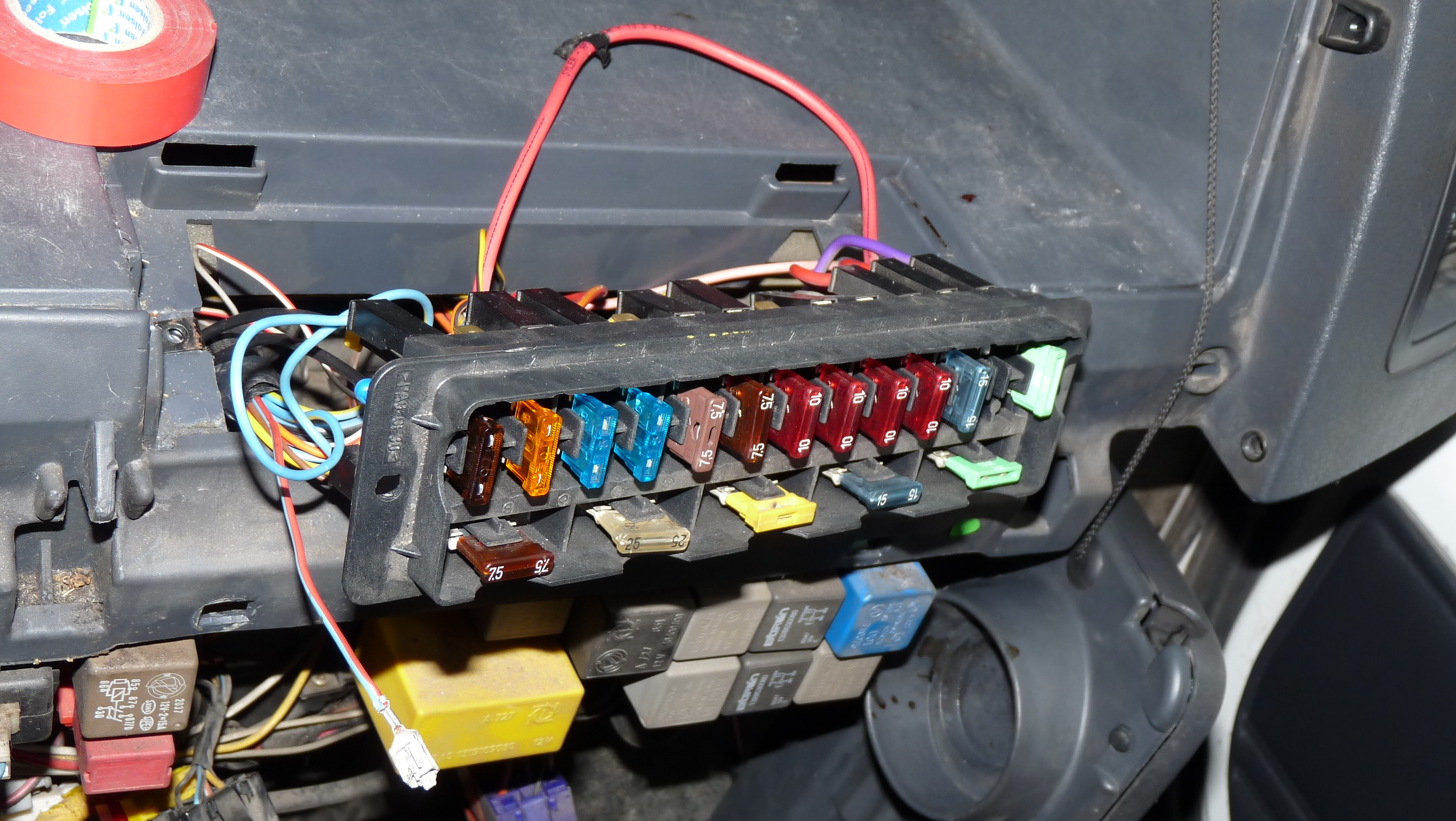
Panel for fuses and circuit breakers

Cars are typically equipped with interior lighting which can be toggled manually or be set to light up automatically with doors open, an entertainment system which originated from car radios, sideways windows which can be lowered or raised electrically (manually on earlier cars), and one or multiple auxiliary power outlets for supplying portable appliances such as mobile phones, portable fridges, power inverters, and electrical air pumps from the on-board electrical system. (Note: Auxiliary power outlets may be supplied continuously or only when the ignition is active depending on electrical wiring.) More costly upper-class and luxury cars are equipped with features earlier such as massage seats and collision avoidance systems.

Dedicated automotive fuses and circuit breakers prevent damage from electrical overload.

=== Lighting ===
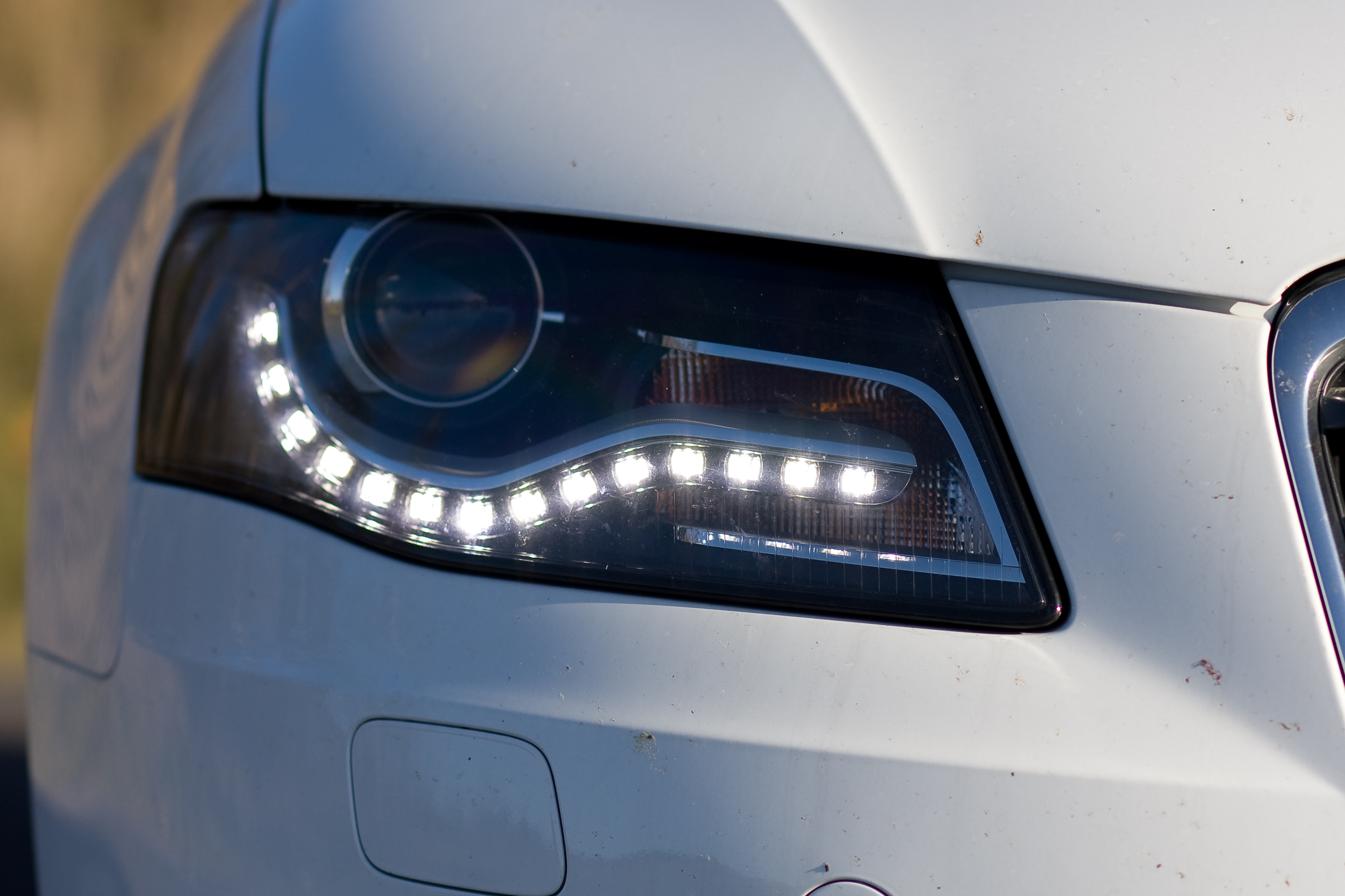
Audi A4 daytime running lights

Cars are typically fitted with multiple types of lights. These include headlights, which are used to illuminate the way ahead and make the car visible to other users, so that the vehicle can be used at night; in some jurisdictions, daytime running lights; red brake lights to indicate when the brakes are applied; amber turn signal lights to indicate the turn intentions of the driver; white-coloured reverse lights to illuminate the area behind the car (and indicate that the driver will be or is reversing); and on some vehicles, additional lights (e.g., side marker lights) to increase the visibility of the car. Interior ceiling lights in the car are usually fitted for the driver and passengers. Some vehicles also have a boot light and, more rarely, an engine compartment light.

=== Weight and size ===
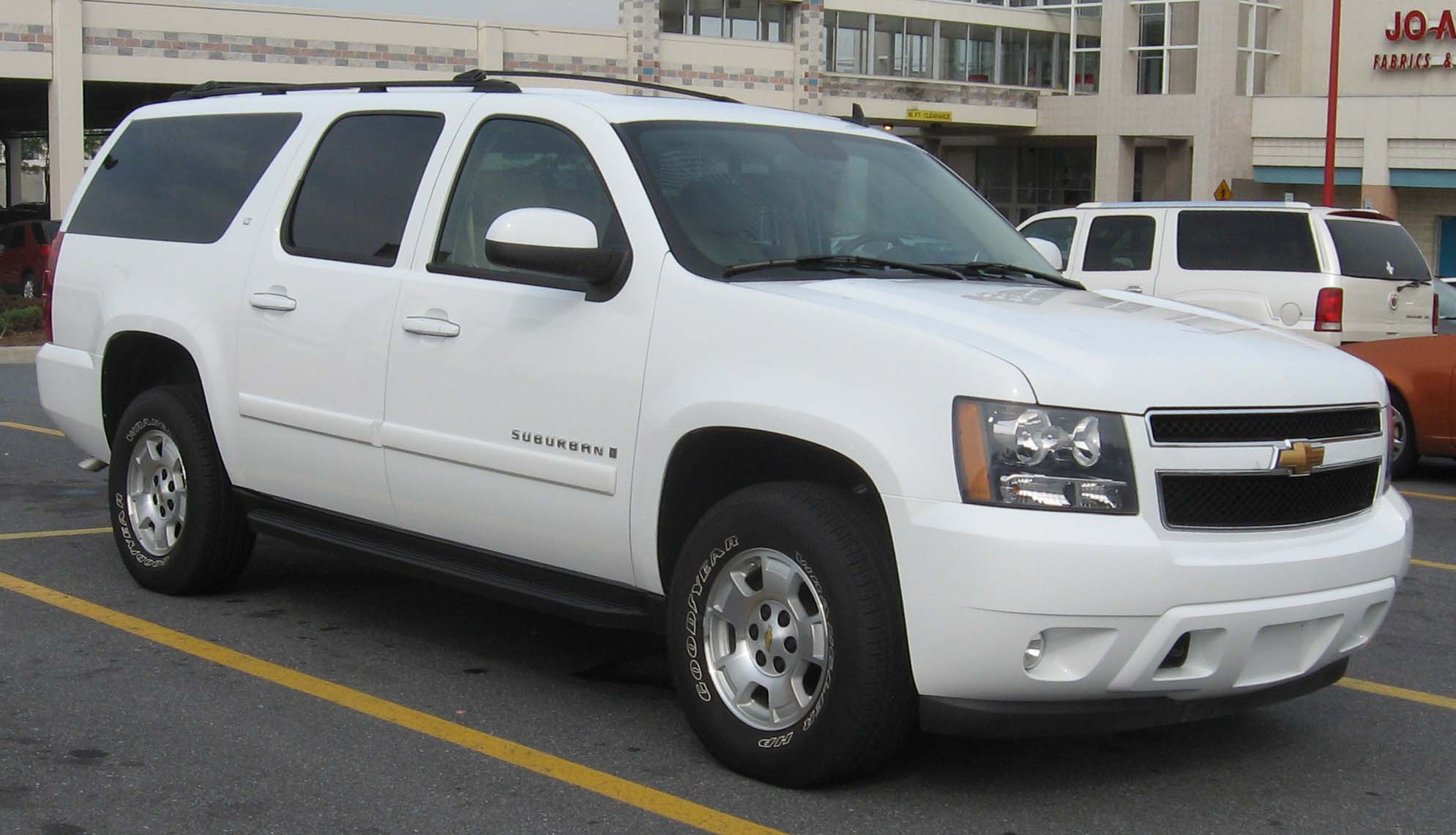
A Chevrolet Suburban extended-length SUV weighs 3,300 kilograms (7,200 lb) (gross weight).

During the late 20th and early 21st century, cars increased in weight due to batteries, modern steel safety cages, anti-lock brakes, airbags, and "more-powerful—if more efficient—engines" and, as of 2019, typically weigh between 1 and 3 tonnes (1.1 and 3.3 short tons; 0.98 and 2.95 long tons). Heavier cars are safer for the driver from a crash perspective, but more dangerous for other vehicles and road users. The weight of a car influences fuel consumption and performance, with more weight resulting in increased fuel consumption and decreased performance. The Wuling Hongguang Mini EV, a typical city car, weighs about 700 kilograms (1,500 lb). Heavier cars include SUVs and extended-length SUVs like the Suburban. Cars have also become wider.

Some places tax heavier cars more: as well as improving pedestrian safety, this can encourage manufacturers to use materials such as recycled aluminium instead of steel. It has been suggested that one benefit of subsidising charging infrastructure is that cars can use lighter batteries.

=== Seating and body style ===
Most cars are designed to carry multiple occupants, often with four or five seats. Cars with five seats typically seat two passengers in the front and three in the rear. Full-size cars and large sport utility vehicles can often carry six, seven, or more occupants, depending on seat arrangement. On the other hand, sports cars are most often designed with only two seats. Utility vehicles like pickup trucks combine seating with extra cargo or utility functionality. The differing needs for passenger capacity and their luggage or cargo space has resulted in the availability of a large variety of body styles to meet individual consumer requirements that include, among others, the sedan/saloon, hatchback, station wagon/estate, coupe, and minivan.

== Safety ==
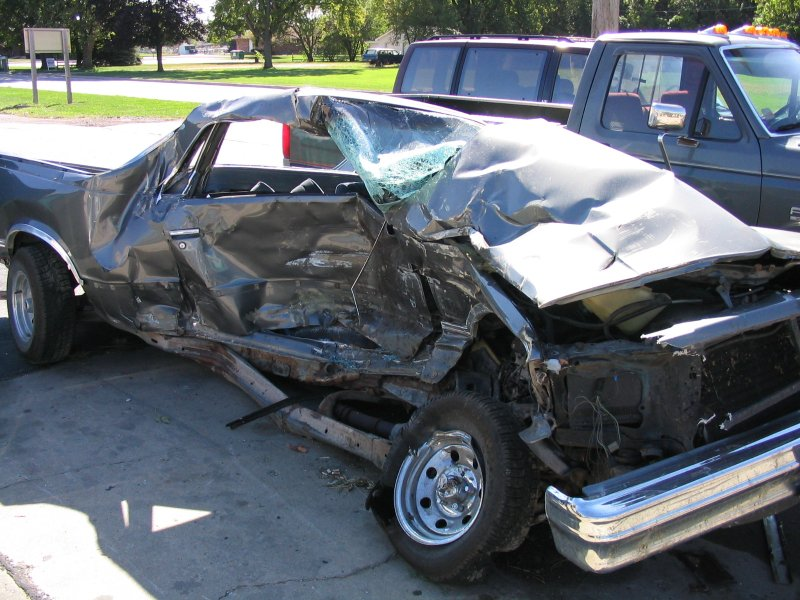
Result of a serious car collision

Traffic collisions are the largest cause of injury-related deaths worldwide. Mary Ward became one of the first documented car fatalities in 1869 in Parsonstown, Ireland, and Henry Bliss one of the US's first pedestrian car casualties in 1899 in New York City. There are now standard tests for safety in new cars, such as the Euro and US NCAP tests, and insurance-industry-backed tests by the Insurance Institute for Highway Safety (IIHS). However, not all such tests consider the safety of people outside the car, such as drivers of other cars, pedestrians and cyclists. Some countries are tightening safety regulations for new cars, for example to mandate data recorders and automated braking.

== Costs and benefits ==
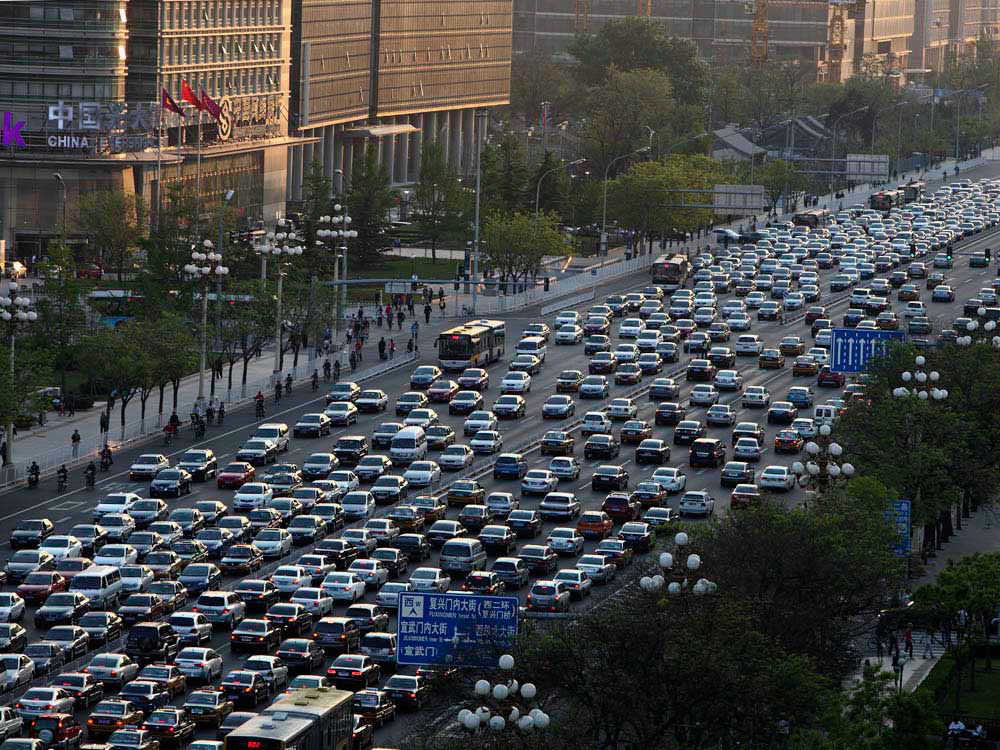
Road congestion is an issue in many major cities (pictured is Chang'an Avenue in Beijing).

The costs of car usage, which may include the cost of: acquiring the vehicle, repairs and auto maintenance, fuel, depreciation, driving time, parking fees, taxes, and insurance, are weighed against the cost of the alternatives, and the value of the benefits—perceived and real—of vehicle usage. The benefits may include on-demand transportation, mobility, independence, and convenience, and emergency power. During the 1920s, cars had another benefit: "[c]ouples finally had a way to head off on unchaperoned dates, plus they had a private space to snuggle up close at the end of the night."

Similarly the costs to society of car use may include; maintaining roads, land use, air pollution, noise pollution, road congestion, public health, health care, and of disposing of the vehicle at the end of its life; and can be balanced against the value of the benefits to society that car use generates. Societal benefits may include economic benefits, such as job and wealth creation, from car production and maintenance, transportation provision, societal wellbeing derived from leisure and travel opportunities, and revenue generation from the tax opportunities. The ability of humans to move flexibly from place to place has far-reaching implications for the nature of societies.

== Environmental effects ==
Trucks' share of US vehicles produced has tripled since 1975. Though vehicle fuel efficiency has increased within each category, the overall trend toward less efficient types of vehicles has offset some of the benefits of greater fuel economy and reductions in pollution and carbon dioxide emissions. Without the shift towards SUVs, energy use per unit distance could have fallen 30% more than it did from 2010 to 2022.

Growing sales of electric vehicles (EVs) indicate a trend away from gas-powered vehicles that generate greenhouse gases that cause climate change.

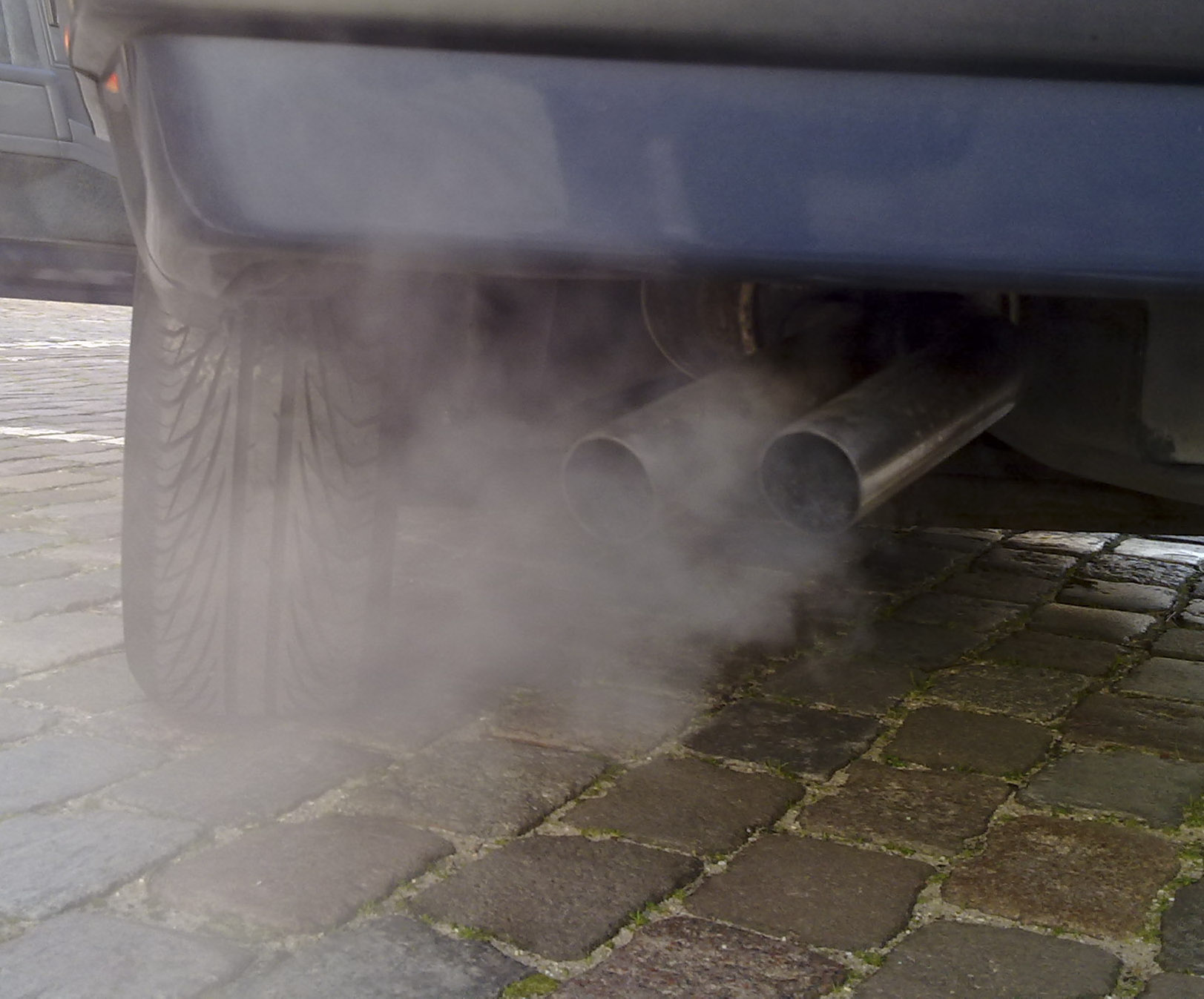
Car exhaust gas is one type of pollution

Car production and use have a large number of environmental impacts: it causes local air pollution plastic pollution and contributes to greenhouse gas emissions and climate change. Cars and vans caused 10% of energy-related carbon dioxide emissions in 2022. As of 2023, electric cars produce about half the emissions over their lifetime as diesel and petrol cars. This is set to improve as countries produce more of their electricity from low-carbon sources. Cars consume almost a quarter of world oil production as of 2019. Cities planned around cars are often less dense, which leads to further emissions, as they are less walkable, for instance. A growing demand for large SUVs is driving up emissions from cars.

Cars are a major cause of air pollution, which stems from exhaust gas in diesel and petrol cars and from dust from brakes, tyres, and road wear. Larger cars pollute more. Heavy metals and microplastics (from tyres) are also released into the environment, during production, use, and at the end of life. Mining related to car manufacturing and oil spills both cause water pollution.

Animals and plants are often negatively affected by cars through habitat destruction and fragmentation caused by the road network, as well as pollution. Animals are also killed every year on roads by cars, referred to as roadkill. More recent road developments are including significant environmental mitigation in their designs, such as green bridges (designed to allow wildlife crossings) and creating wildlife corridors.

Governments use fiscal policies, such as road tax, to discourage the purchase and use of more polluting cars; Vehicle emission standards ban the sale of new highly pollution cars. Many countries plan to stop selling fossil cars altogether between 2025 and 2050. Various cities have implemented low-emission zones, banning old fossil fuel and Amsterdam is planning to ban fossil fuel cars completely. Some cities make it easier for people to choose other forms of transport, such as cycling. Many Chinese cities limit licensing of fossil fuel cars.

== Social issues ==
Mass production of personal motor vehicles in the United States and other developed countries with extensive territories, such as Australia, Argentina, and France, vastly increased individual and group mobility and greatly expanded economic development in urban, suburban, exurban, and rural areas. Growth in the popularity of cars and commuting has led to traffic congestion. Moscow, Istanbul, Bogotá, Mexico City and São Paulo were the world's most congested cities in 2018 according to INRIX, a data analytics company.

=== Access to cars ===
In the United States, the transport divide and car dependency resulting from domination of car-based transport systems presents barriers to employment in low-income neighbourhoods, with many low-income individuals and families forced to run cars they cannot afford in order to maintain their income. Dependency on automobiles by African Americans may result in exposure to the hazards of driving while black and other types of racial discrimination related to buying, financing and insuring them.

=== Health impact ===
Air pollution from cars increases the risk of a number of diseases, including stroke, heart disease, chronic obstructive pulmonary disease (COPD), lung cancer, respiratory infections and aggravated asthma. Air pollution is also linked to global impacts on all aspects of sexual reproduction from male and female fertility to fetal development, birth outcomes, and long-term health of offspring. Children are extra vulnerable to air pollution, as their bodies are still developing and air pollution in children is linked to the development of asthma, childhood cancer, and neurocognitive issues such as autism. The growth in popularity of the car allowed cities to sprawl, therefore encouraging more travel by car, resulting in inactivity and obesity, which in turn can lead to increased risk of a variety of diseases. When places are designed around cars, children have fewer opportunities to go places by themselves and lose opportunities to become more independent.

== Emerging car technologies ==
Intensive development of conventional battery electric vehicles is continuing into the 2020s, for example lithium iron phosphate batteries are safer and cheaper. Sensors such as lidar are more used. Other car technologies that are under development include wireless charging. Software is increasing and may have many new uses, for example automatically not hitting pedestrians.

New materials which may replace steel car bodies include aluminium, fibreglass, carbon fibre, biocomposites, and carbon nanotubes. Telematics technology is allowing more and more people to share cars, on a pay-as-you-go basis, through car share and carpool schemes. Communication is also evolving due to connected car systems. Open-source cars are not widespread. Microwave weapons which can disable cars are being tested.

=== Self-driving car ===
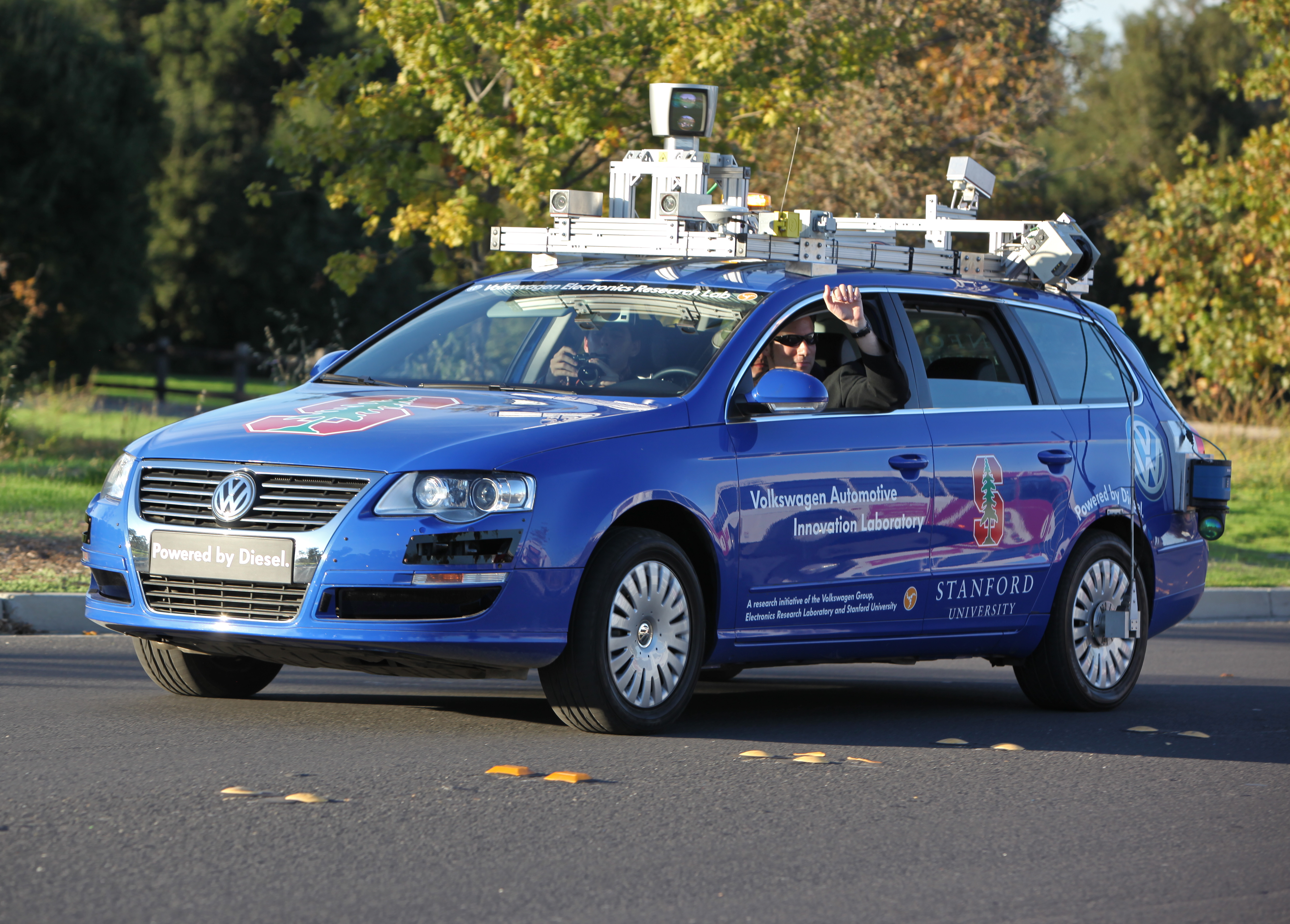
A robotic Volkswagen Passat shown at Stanford University is a driverless car.

Fully self-driving vehicles, also known as autonomous cars, already exist as robotaxis in some locations. Laws for the regulation of self-driving cars will need updating before widespread deployment can happen.

=== Car sharing ===
Car-share arrangements and carpooling are also increasingly popular, in the US and Europe. Services like car sharing offer residents to "share" a vehicle rather than own a car in already congested neighbourhoods.

== Industry ==
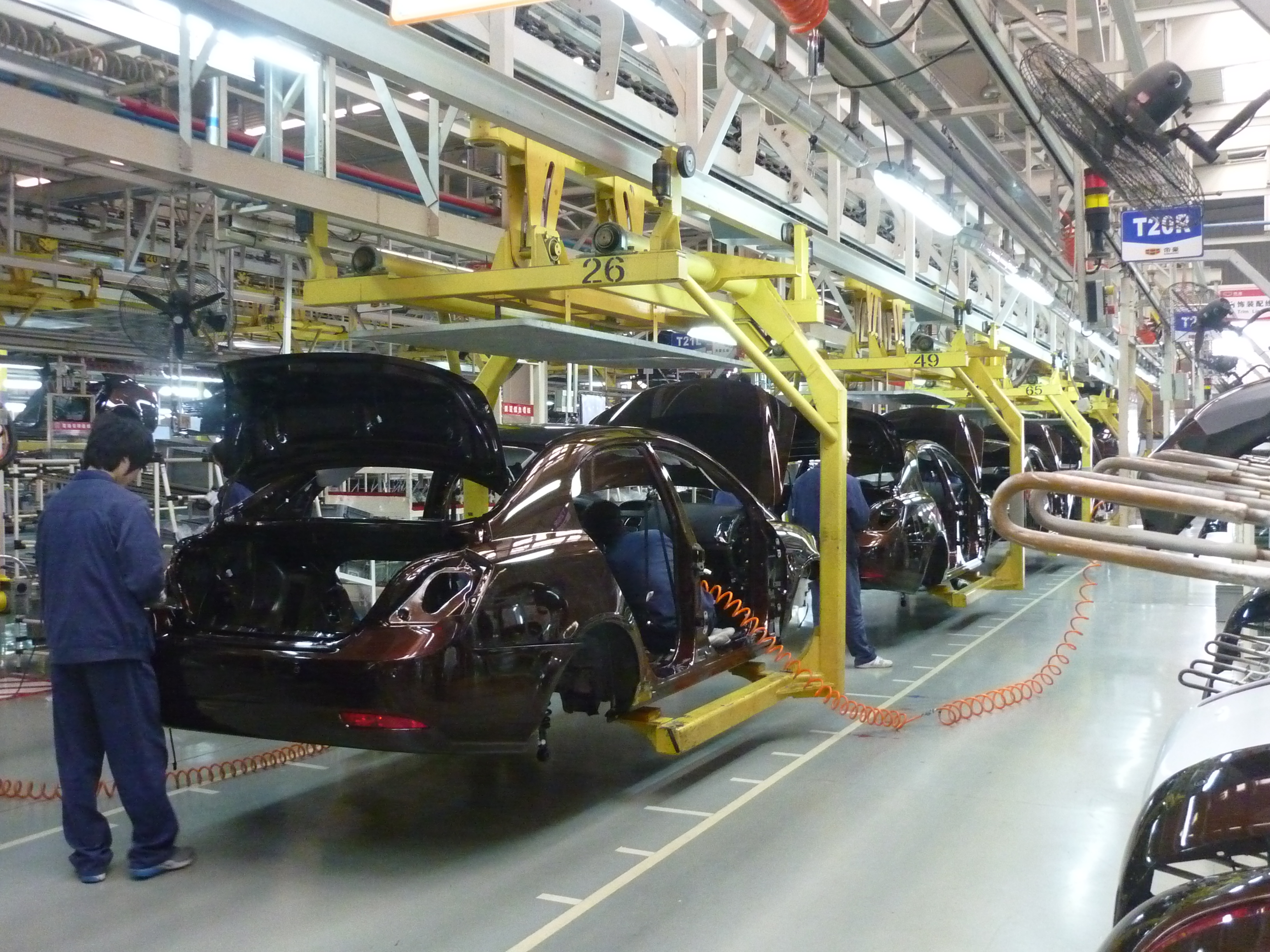
A car being assembled in a factory

The automotive industry designs, develops, manufactures, markets, and sells the world's motor vehicles, more than three-quarters of which are cars. In 2020, there were 56 million cars manufactured worldwide, down from 67 million the previous year. The automotive industry in China produces by far the most (20 million in 2020), followed by Japan (seven million), then Germany, South Korea, and India. The largest market is China, followed by the US.

There are around 1.644 billion cars in use worldwide as of January 2025; they burn over a trillion litres (0.26×10^{12} US gal; 0.22×10^{12} imp gal) of petrol and diesel fuel yearly, consuming about 50 exajoules (14,000 TWh) of energy. The number of cars is increasing rapidly in China and India. In the opinion of some, urban transport systems based around the car have proved unsustainable, consuming excessive energy, affecting the health of populations, and delivering a declining level of service despite increasing investment. Many of these negative effects fall disproportionately on those social groups who are also least likely to own and drive cars. The sustainable transport movement focuses on solutions to these problems. The car industry is also facing increasing competition from the public transport sector, as some people re-evaluate their use of private vehicles. In July 2021, the European Commission introduced the "Fit for 55" legislation package, outlining crucial directives for the automotive sector's future. According to this package, by 2035, all newly sold cars in the European market must be Zero-emissions vehicles.

== Alternatives ==
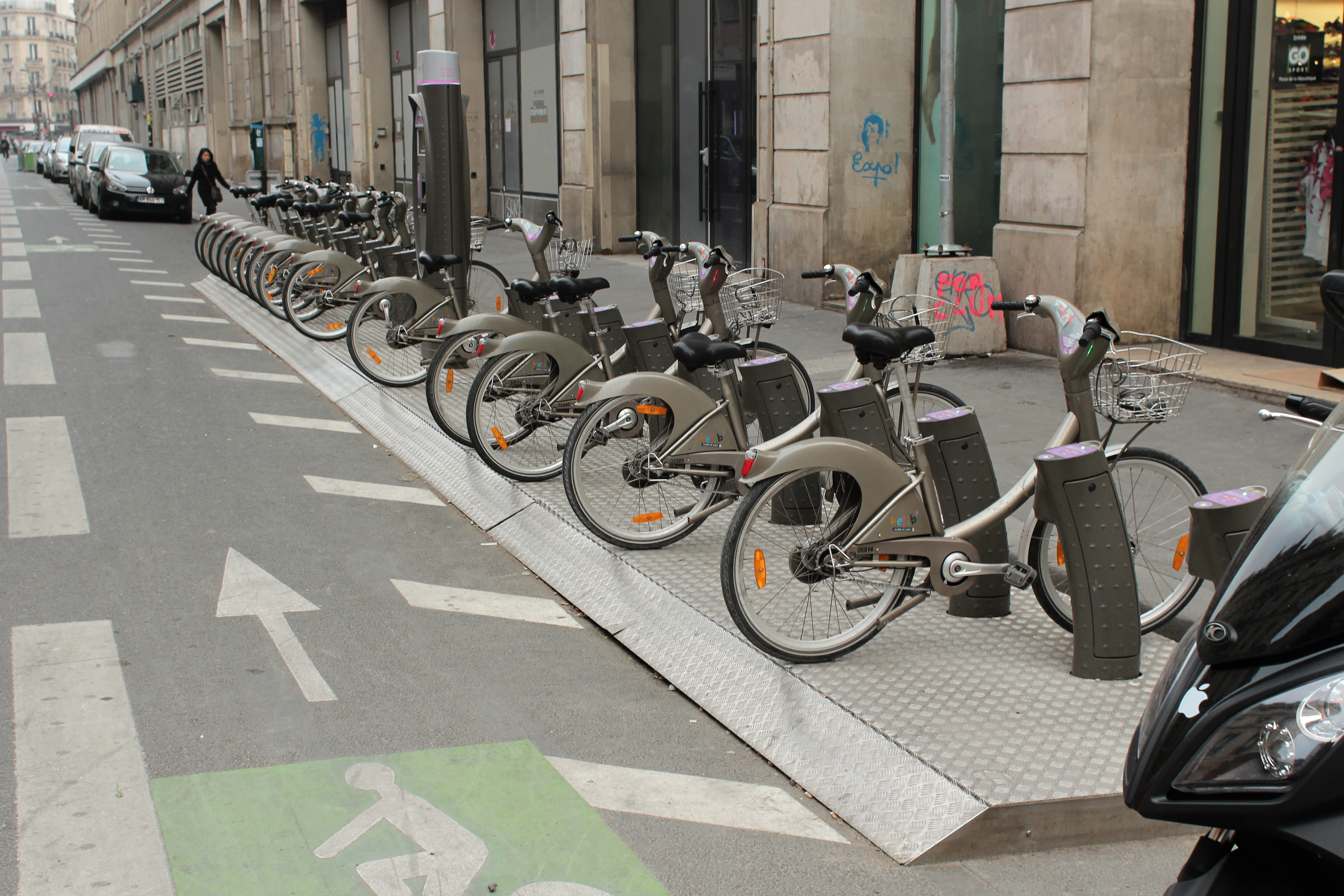
The Vélib' in Paris, France, is the largest bikesharing system outside China.

Established alternatives for some aspects of car use include public transport such as busses, trolleybusses, trains, subways, tramways, light rail, cycling, and walking. Bicycle sharing systems have been established in China and many European cities, including Copenhagen and Amsterdam. Similar programmes have been developed in large US cities. Additional individual modes of transport, such as personal rapid transit could serve as an alternative to cars if they prove to be socially accepted. A study which checked the costs and the benefits of introducing Low Traffic Neighbourhood in London found the benefits overpass the costs approximately by 100 times in the first 20 years and the difference is growing over time.

== Motorsport ==
Auto racing is a sport involving the racing of automobiles. It includes various racing series such as Formula One, IndyCar Series, NASCAR, World Rally Championship and MotoGP.

== See also ==
General:

- Automotive safety
- Car classification
- Car costs
- Green vehicle
- Jaywalking
- Model vehicle
- Motor vehicle fatality rate in U.S. by year
- Motor vehicle theft
- Peak car
- Steering
- Traffic collision

Effects:

- Car dependency
- Effects of the car on societies
- Energy consumption of cars
- Environmental effects of transport
- Externalities of automobiles
- Fenceline community
- Mobile source air pollution
- Noise pollution
- Roadway noise
- Traffic congestion
- Urban sprawl

Mitigation:

- Car-free movement
- Carfree city
- Congestion pricing
- Highway revolt
- New Urbanism
- Smart growth
- Transit-oriented development
