= Peugeot Type 172 =

Peugeot Type 172 was a car model made by Peugeot that spanned the years 1923–1929, applied to two different nameplates. For specific details on each instance of this model, see:

- Peugeot Quadrilette for derivatives Type 172, 172 BS
- Peugeot 5CV for derivatives Type 172 BC, 172 R, 172 M, 172 S
