= Santler =

British classical age petrol driven car

The Santler was a British car built in Malvern Link, Worcestershire, England, between 1889 and 1922. They have a good claim to be Britain's first makers of petrol driven cars.

== General engineering ==
The Santler brothers Charles (1864-1940) and Walter (1867-1942) ran a small general engineering company started by their father in about 1875. They moved into the bicycle business and in 1887 designed a small steam engine which they had running in 1889 and installed in a four-wheeled chassis. All of this was being done in their spare time while the business moved on to electrical installation with small electric generators run by steam or gas engines or water turbines.

== Cars ==
One of their clients was the mother of pioneering motorist Hon Evelyn Ellis. Using the expertise gained with small engines, Charles adapted one of the gas engines to replace the steam engine in their experimental car. The fuel was compressed town gas stored in a tank under the chassis, but this was heavy and gave the car a limited range. Around 1894 the engine was replaced again by a single-cylinder petrol one. There has been some controversy over the exact date this was done but in 1896 it was confirmed by the dating committee of the Veteran Car Club of Great Britain. The car still exists but not with the original engine.

A new and improved car was built in 1897, but again the work from their main business kept vehicle production as a spare-time activity. They may also have made some motorised bicycles. A further car, a two-seater, was made in 1901 still with a single-cylinder engine, now mounted at the front, with belt drive to a central gearbox and chain to the rear wheels. It was subsequently converted to four seats.

A larger four-seater followed in 1907 followed by another gap until a new model appeared in 1913 with a four-cylinder Dorman engine. This was the first Santler to be advertised for sale, with a two-seater at £175 and four-seater at £190. There was also a van. It is not known how many were made. The First World War stopped further developments, and the factory was turned over to military work.

After the war the brothers tried to sell a motor plough they had developed from 1910 onwards, but this was not a success. Returning to car production, they brought out a three-wheeler called the Rushabout in 1920 advertised for £165. This was similar to the car made by the nearby Morgan Motor Company using a front-mounted, air-cooled, V-twin engine, but suspension and transmission were not the same. It was not a success, and in spite of a drastic reduction in price to £85 did not sell. About 12 were made but none are known to survive.

== Closure ==
The company finally ran out of money and closed in about 1922. Walter went on to become resident engineer at Ampleforth College, where they had fitted an electric generator in the 1890s. Charles also left Malvern, but he went to New Zealand to work on railway signalling. He returned home in 1939 but was killed by the only bomb dropped on Worcester during the Second World War.

== See also ==
- List of car manufacturers of the United Kingdom
