= Xtra (automobile) =

Overview
- Manufacturer: Xtra Cars
- Production: 1922–1924
- Designer: Cuthbert Clarke

Body and chassis
- Class: Cyclecar
- Body style: single or two seat open

Powertrain
- Engine: V-twin JAP or single cylinder Villiers
- Transmission: 2-speed manual

Dimensions
- Length: 106 inches (2692 mm)
- Width: 54 inches (1371 mm)
- Curb weight: 378 lb (171 kg)

The Xtra was an English three-wheel cyclecar launched at the Olympia show in November 1921 and built until 1924 by Xtra Cars, Ltd., of London Road, Chertsey, Surrey.

A very basic machine, it was designed by Cuthbert Clarke and resembled a three-wheeled sidecar in most respects. The car was powered by a 3.75 hp single-cylinder, two stroke, 270 cc Villiers engine and had a friction drive two-speed transmission, using two cork covered wheels of different sizes, chain driven by the engine. These wheels ran within a drum which was mounted on the single rear wheel and one would make contact to provide drive at the appropriate ratio. They were controlled by a lever which could be pushed or pulled to engage drive and had a central neutral position. There was no reverse gear. Rear suspension was by a coil spring on the engine frame. There was no front axle, the wheels were controlled by two transverse leaf springs. Steering was by rack and pinion. Braking was on the rear wheel only and used shoes operating on the outside of the transmission drum.

The first Xtra was a single seater (monocar) with a light plywood on ash frame body with an occasional seat behind the driver on top of the engine. It featured acetylene lighting. A top speed of above 30 mph (48 km/h) was claimed.

The monocar was joined in November 1922 by a "Sociable" two seater with side by side seats and an option of having an 8 hp, V-twin JAP engine in place of the Villiers.

Xtra went into voluntary liquidation in May 1924 and was finally wound up in July 1926. It is not known how many cars were made.

== See also ==
- List of car manufacturers of the United Kingdom
