= Peugeot Quadrilette =

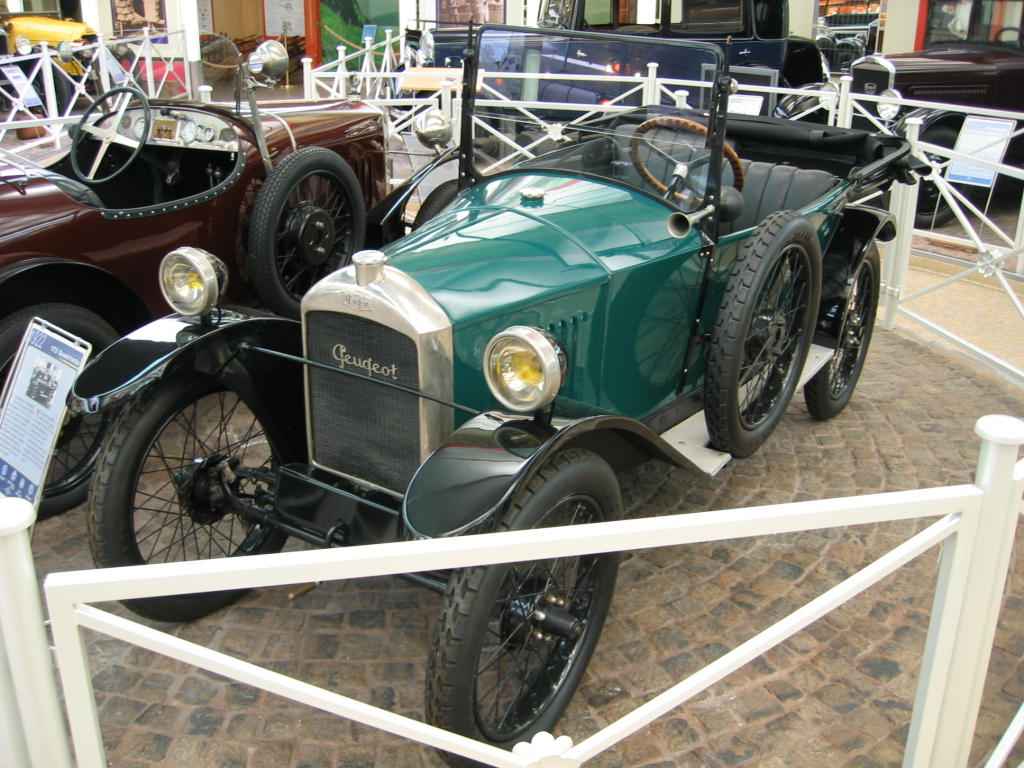

Overview
- Manufacturer: Peugeot
- Also called: Peugeot Type 161; Peugeot Type 172
- Production: 1921–1924; 12,305 produced

Body and chassis
- Class: Supermini
- Layout: FR layout

Powertrain
- Engine: 667 cc I4; 720 cc I4
- Transmission: 3-speed manual

Chronology
- Predecessor: Peugeot Bébé
- Successor: Peugeot 5CV

Peugeot Quadrilette is the popular name for the Peugeot Type 161 and Peugeot Type 172 and associated models produced between 1921 and 1924.

== Type 161 ==
Peugeot created the Type 161 to reverse its financial woes following the Great War. It was a cheap, practical, very small economy car and was nicknamed the Quadrilette when shown at the 1920 Brussels Motor Show. It was available for sale in 1921. In order to put it into the minimal tax bracket—that of cyclecars, for which the tax was 100 francs annually—the 4-cycle, 4-cylinder water-cooled engine displaced a mere 667 cc (40.7 cu in) and produced 9.5 horsepower (7.1 kW). Taking advantage of this small power output was a very lightweight body, under 350 kilograms (770 lb). The vehicle's width was so diminutive that the two seats were placed in tandem, not side by side. Later in 1921, the Type 161E was introduced with side-by-side seats, the passenger seat slightly back to allow the driver room to operate the pedals. The car retailed for 9,900 francs with top, acetylene lights, and spare tire, 9,400 francs without. Fuel economy was highly impressive at 5.0 L/100 km (45 miles per US gallon or 56 miles per Imperial gallon). Top speed was 60 kilometres per hour (37 mph).

== Type 172 ==
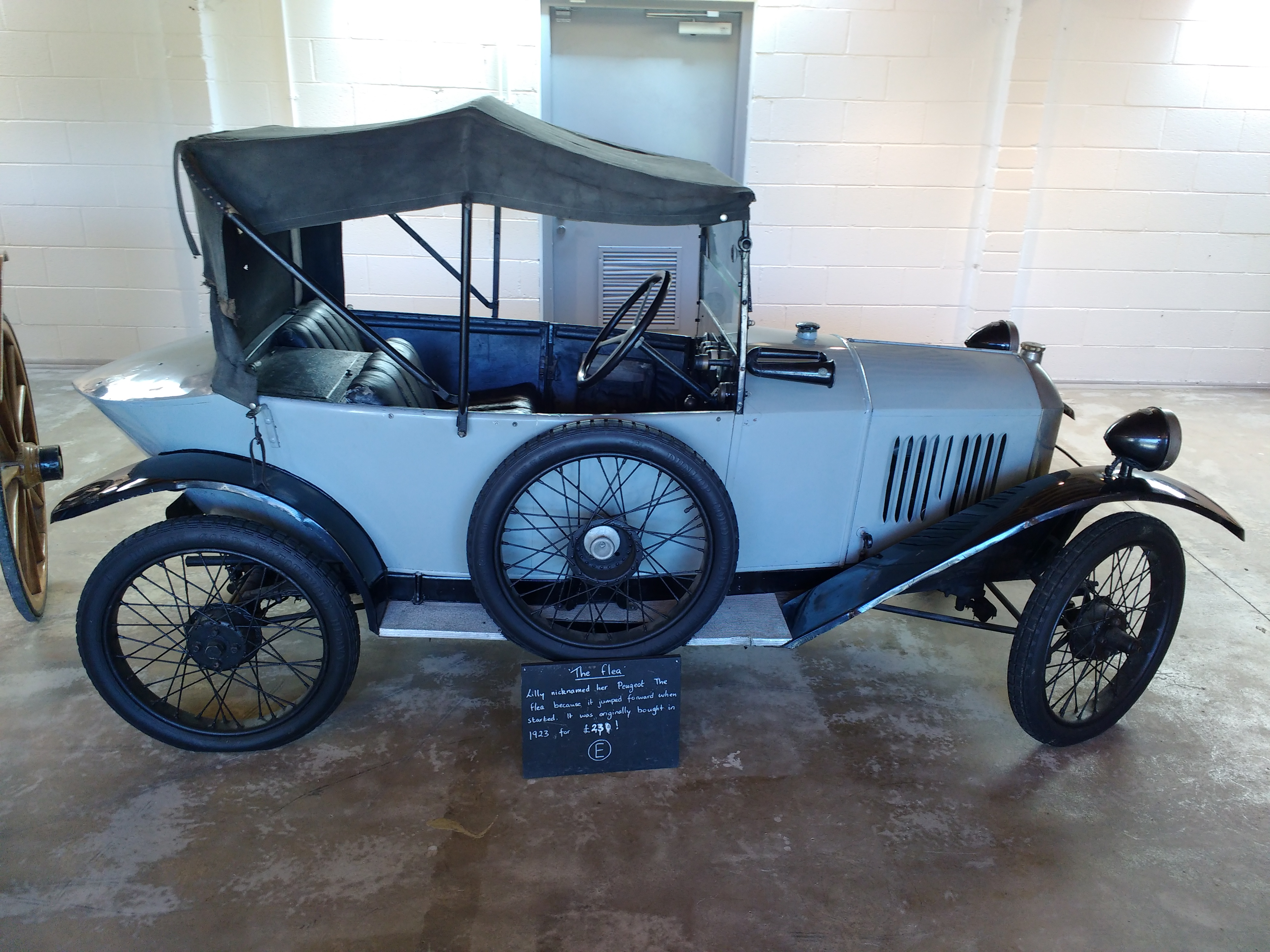
Peugeot Type 172 Quadrilette

Modifications to the Quadrilette in 1923 resulted in the Type 172. launched during the course of 1924. The track was widened so that the two seats could be placed abreast, improving comfort and space. Though the wheelbase was shortened, luggage room was more plentiful because there were no longer two rows of seats. The engine remained the same and weight was kept low. Upgraded versions of the Type 172, such as the Type 172 BC and Type 172 BS also known as the Quadrilette Grand Sport, launched during the course of 1924, had an enlarged 720 cc side-valve engine with slightly more power.

== Production ==
Total figures for the Quadrilette amounted to 12,305 over three years, which was 31% of Peugeot's vehicle production for that time period. Confusingly, models of the Type 172 were attached both to the Quadrilette's nameplate and to that of its successor, the Peugeot 5CV. The Quadrilette and 5CV were sold side by side in 1924, after which Quadrilette production ceased.

Models and Production
Model	Year	Production
Type 161	1921–1922	3,500
Type 172	1923–1924	8,705
Type 172 BS	1924	100
