= Hans Hautsch =

German inventor

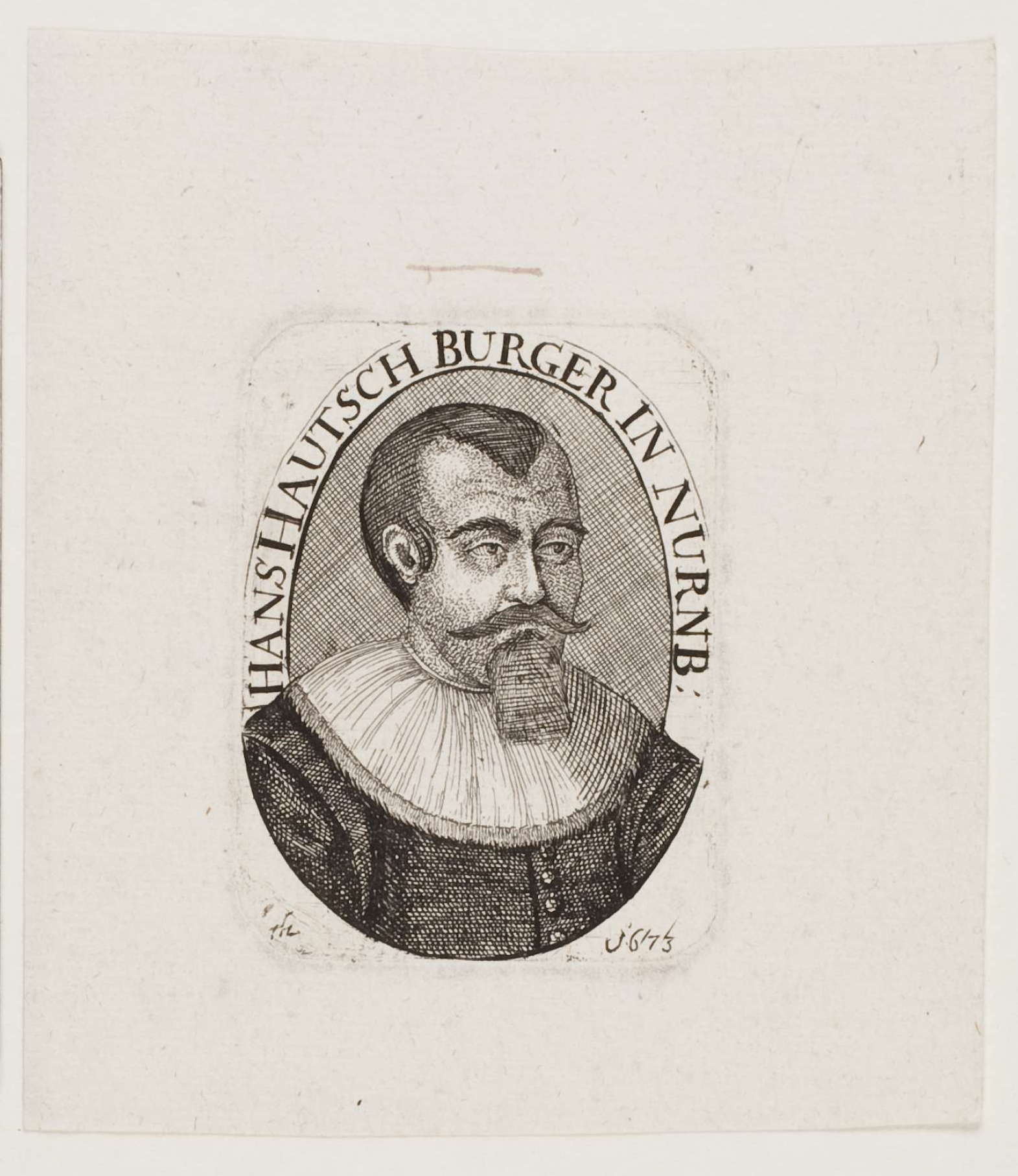
Hans Hautsch

Hans Hautsch (January 4, 1595 – January 31, 1670) was a German toolmaker and inventor from Ledergasse, Nuremberg. His father, Antoni (1563–1627), and grandfather, Kilian (died 1570), were both toolmakers.

He married Magdalena (born 1603), the daughter of carpenter Jacob Flexlein, on June 25, 1621. They had a daughter and five sons, including Georg (born 1624, also a toolmaker), Gottfried (1634–1703), and Johann Andreas (born 1638). Gottfried Hautsch invented the conical touch hole for muzzle-loading guns, whereby the pan closed itself, cutting loading time by two thirds.

== Inventions ==
In 1649, Hans Hautsch designed a wheelchair for gout patients.

Shortly thereafter, he built a self-propelled, four-wheeled mechanical carriage: "It moves by itself and requires no initial preload, from a horse or anything else. The car travels 2000 paces every hour; it stops when the driver pleases, starts when the driver pleases, and works entirely on clockwork."

Shortly afterwards, he was commissioned to produce another chariot, which also apparently operated on clockwork. However, contemporaries were skeptical. In his Mathematischen Erquickstunden (or A Refresher Course in Mathematics, 1651), Georg Philipp Harsdörffer suggested there was a child inside working a crank. French travel writer Balthasar de Monconys, in his 1666 Journal des Voyages, was similarly unconvinced.

In 1650, Hautsch built a fire engine that used a pressurized air vessel to issue a continuous stream of water up to 20m high. On each side, 14 men worked a piston rod back and forth horizontally; a rotating pipe mounted on the hose allowed for a continuous stream of water, even when the piston was being pulled backwards. Caspar Schott observed the engine in 1655 and wrote an account of it in his Magia Universalis.

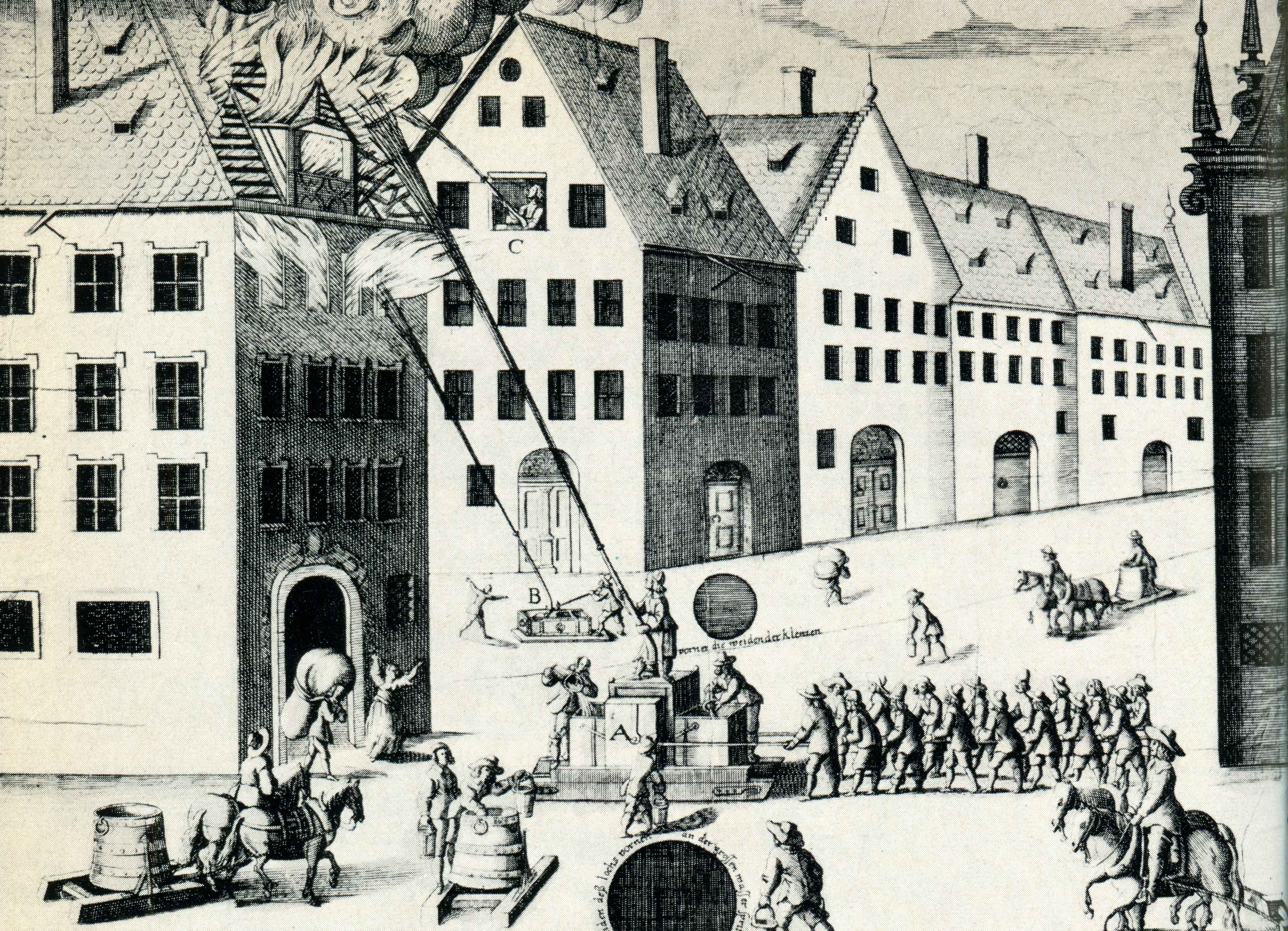
Fire engine invented by Hans Hautsch.

Around 1660, for the occasion of an imperial visit to Nuremberg, Hautsch built a motorized eagle that flapped its wings. This appears to have caused a rumour that he had invented a flying machine.

For the king of Denmark, in 1664, he produced a mechanised dollhouse whose figures performed over 100 individual movements. The following year, he made an instructional model battle for the son of King Louis XIV of France with 462 moving silver soldiers and combat sound effects. He also built a three-storey exhibition which depicted Creation and other Biblical scenes on the bottom stage, seventy-two craftsmen working in the middle, and a large bath house on top.

Hautsch also invented Streuglanz, a sparkling, multicolored gloss made from metal shavings. His descendants continued to prepare Streuglanz for small-scale production of wallpaper and enamelled crafts until the end of the eighteenth century.

== Bibliography ==
- Johann Gabriel Doppelmayr. Historische Nachricht Von den Nürnbergischen Mathematicis und Künstlern, Part 2, Nürnberg:Monath 1730. S. 300 f. and Tab. IV, fig. 2
- Franz Maria Feldhaus (1905). "Hautsch, Hans" . Allgemeine Deutsche Biographie (in German). Vol. 50. Leipzig: Duncker & Humblot. p. 84.
- Ernst Hautsch. "Der Nürnberger Zirkelschmied Hans Hautsch (1959-1670) und seine Erfindungen". Mitteilungen des Vereins für Geschichte der Stadt Nürnberg; 46, 1955: 533–556.
- Carl Graf von Klinckowstroem (1969). "Hautsch, Hans". Neue Deutsche Biographie (in German). Vol. 8. Berlin: Duncker & Humblot. pp. 132–133. (full text online).
