= Peugeot 5CV =

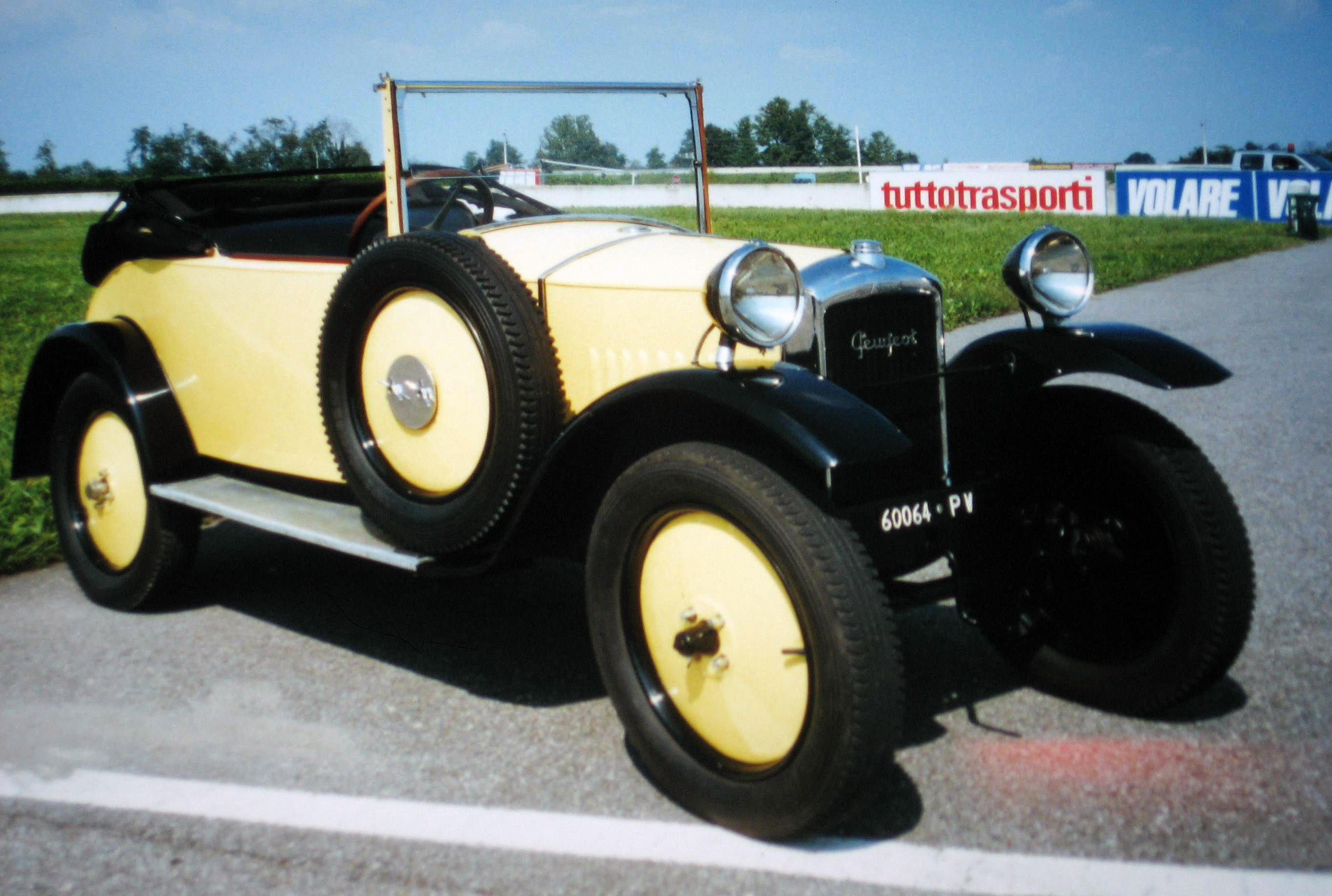

Overview
- Manufacturer: Peugeot
- Production: 1924–1929; 48,285 produced

Body and chassis
- Class: Supermini
- Layout: FR layout

Powertrain
- Engine: 667 cc I4; 695 cc I4; 720 cc I4
- Transmission: 3-speed manual

Chronology
- Predecessor: Peugeot Quadrilette
- Successor: Peugeot Type 190

Peugeot 5CV was a popular name for several models of the Peugeot Type 172 between 1925 and 1929.

== Debut ==
The first of the 5CV series was the Type 172 BC, itself a new model, though similar to the Quadrilette, which was still sold through 1924. The Type 172 BC carried over the 667 cc engine from the Quadrilette, but with power up to 11 hp (8.1 kW). It debuted at the Tour de France automobile in 1924.

== Models ==
Small styling changes and a new engine changed the Type 172 BC into the Type 172 R in 1926. The engine was a 720 cc inline-four and produced the same power rating as before, but torque was quoted appreciably higher. In 1928, the engine was replaced with a smaller 695 cc powerplant that nevertheless produced more power, at 14 hp (10 kW). The smaller engine lowered the rating of the new Type 172 M tax classification to 4CV, and the track was widened.

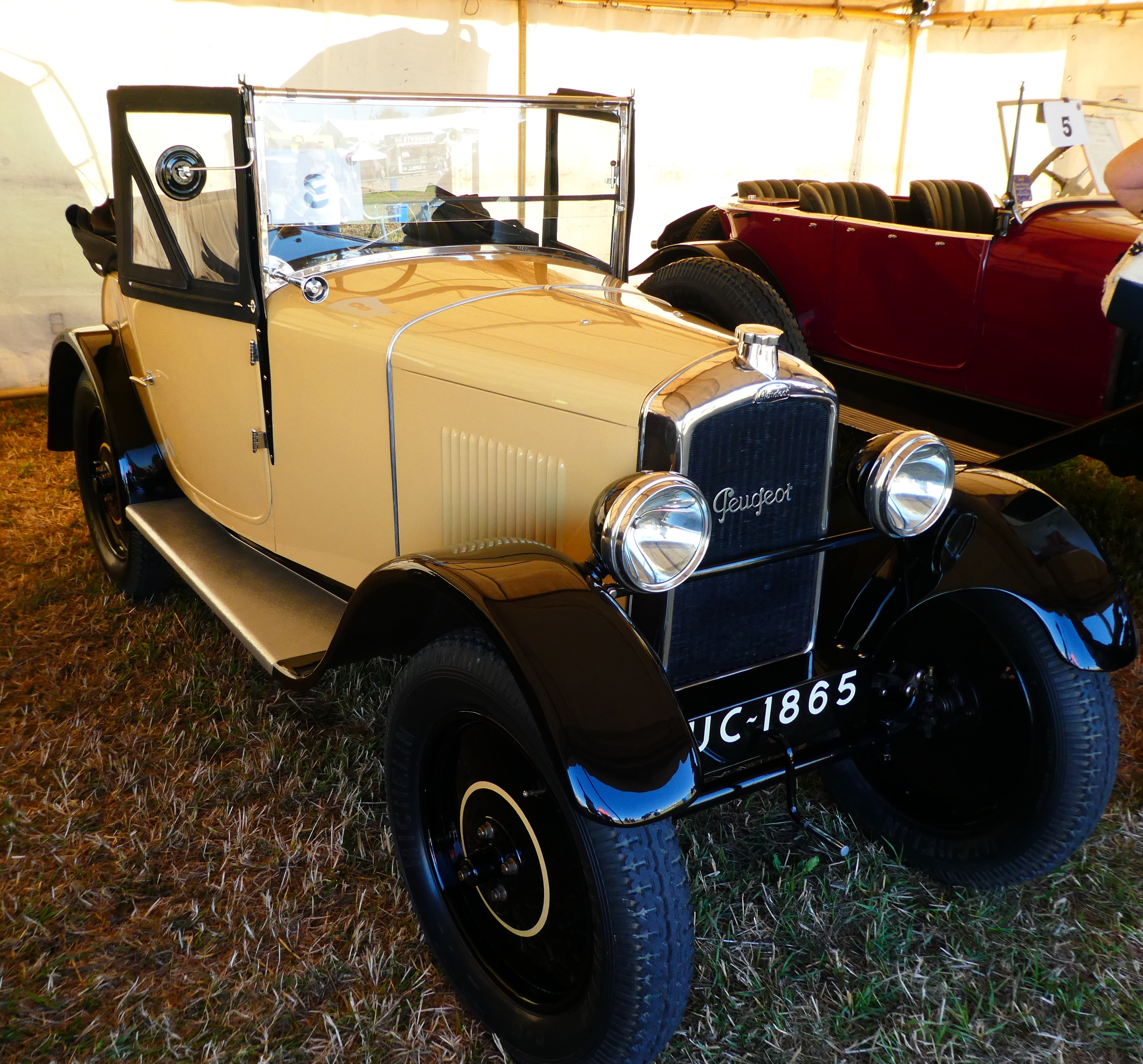
1928 Peugeot 5CV Type 172 R Cabriolet

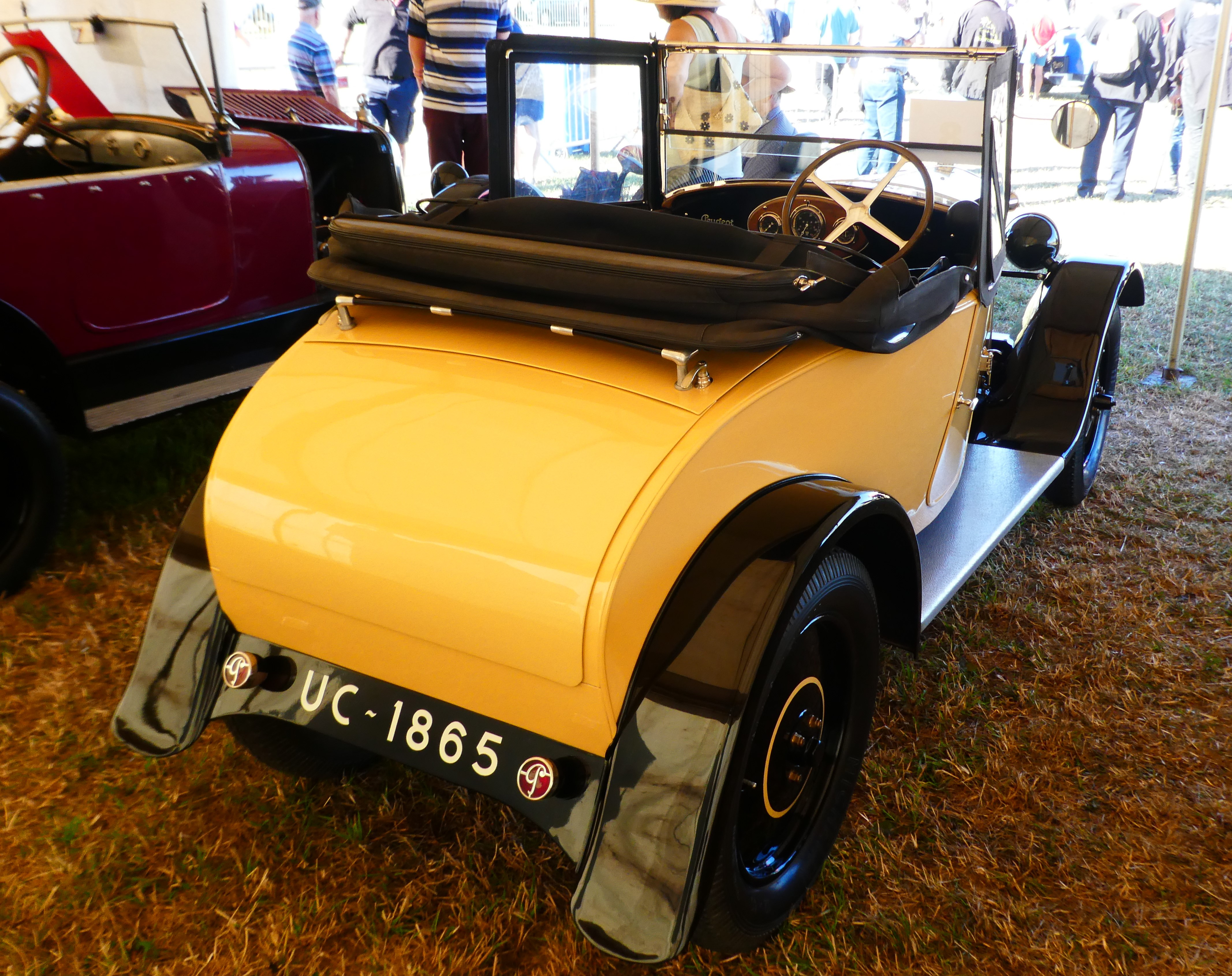
Rear view of 1928 Peugeot 5CV Type 172 R Cabriolet

== Production ==
Total production of the Type 172 models in this timeframe amounted to 48,285 units.

Models and Production
Model	Year	Production
Type 172 BC	1924–1925	7,084
Type 172 R	1926–1928	27,119
Type 172 M	1928	11,970
Type 172 S	1929	2,112
